= Marriage pendant portraits by Frans Hals =

The following are pendant portraits by Frans Hals painted on the occasion of a marriage or marriage anniversary. This list is a subset of the list of paintings by Frans Hals, showing the marriage portraits side by side.

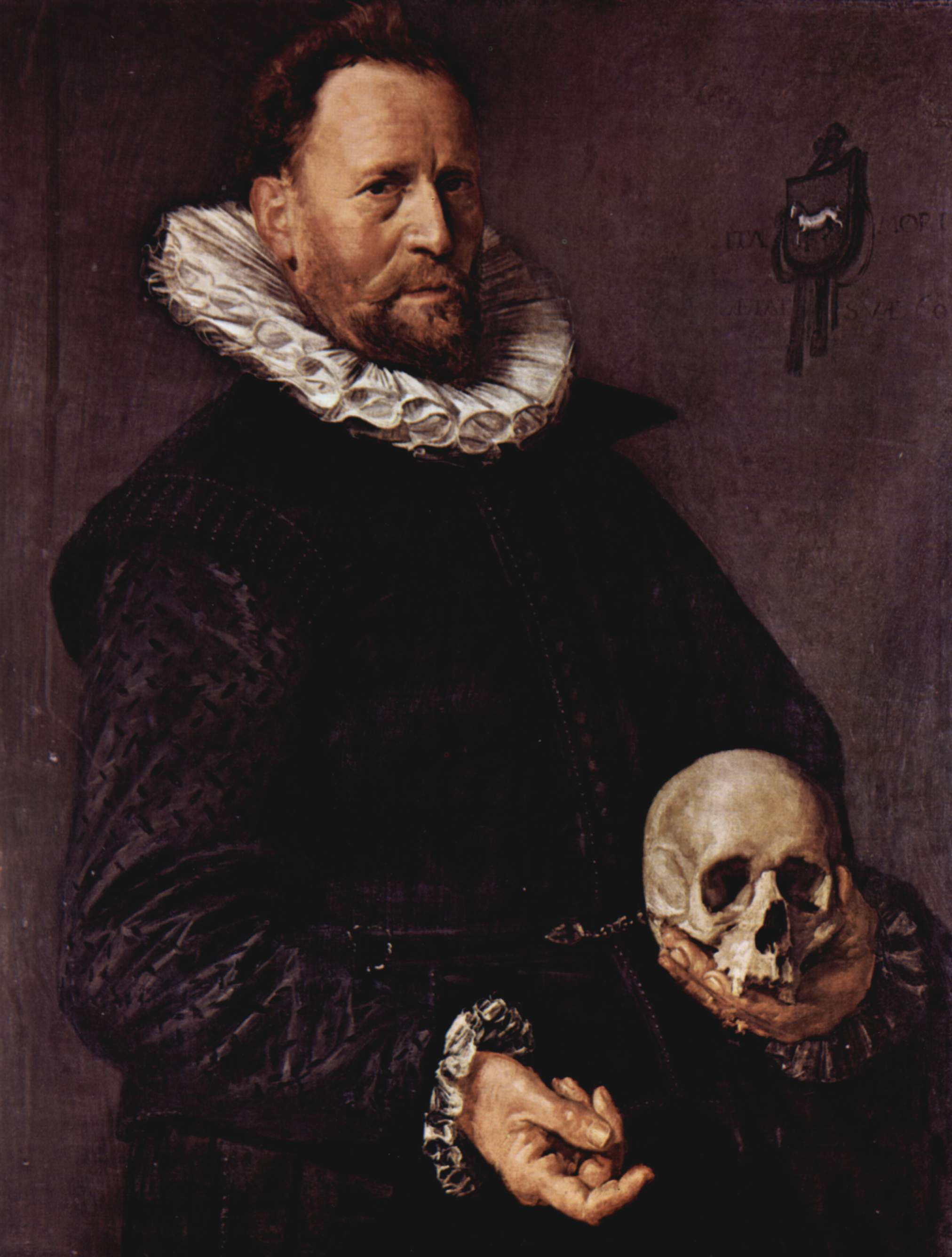
Portrait of a Man Holding a Skull (Hals; Birmingham)

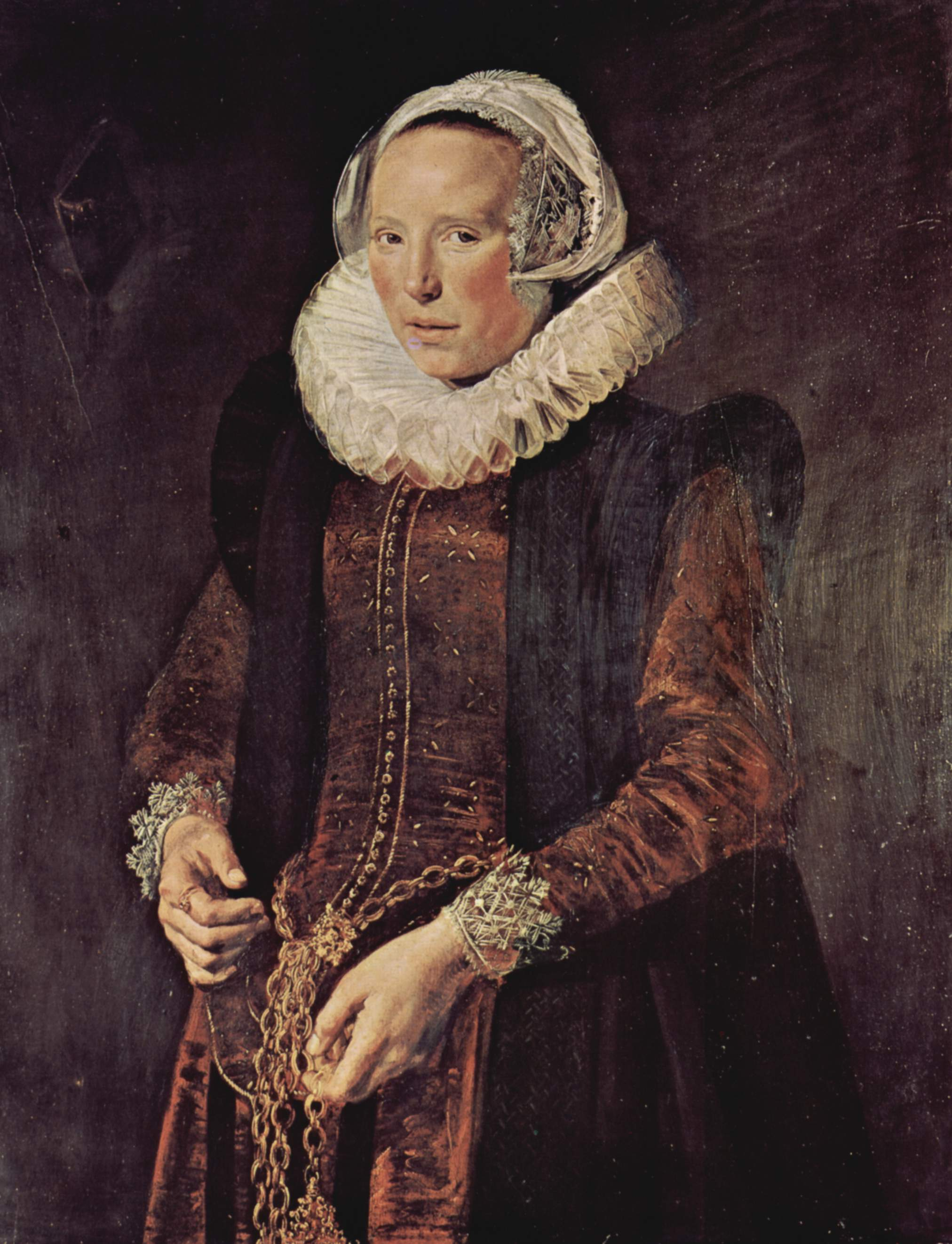
Portrait of a Woman Standing
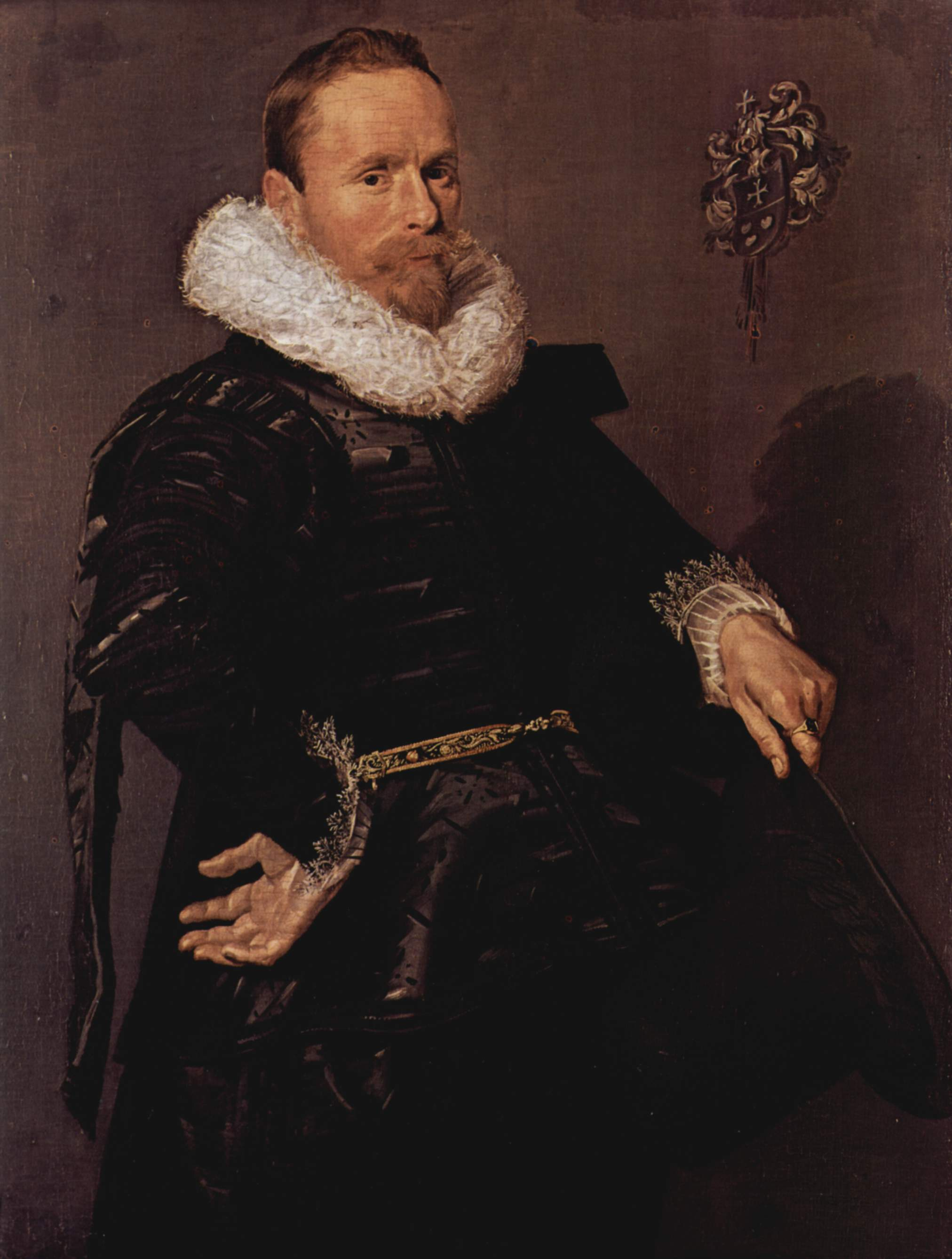
Portrait of a Man Standing (Kassel)

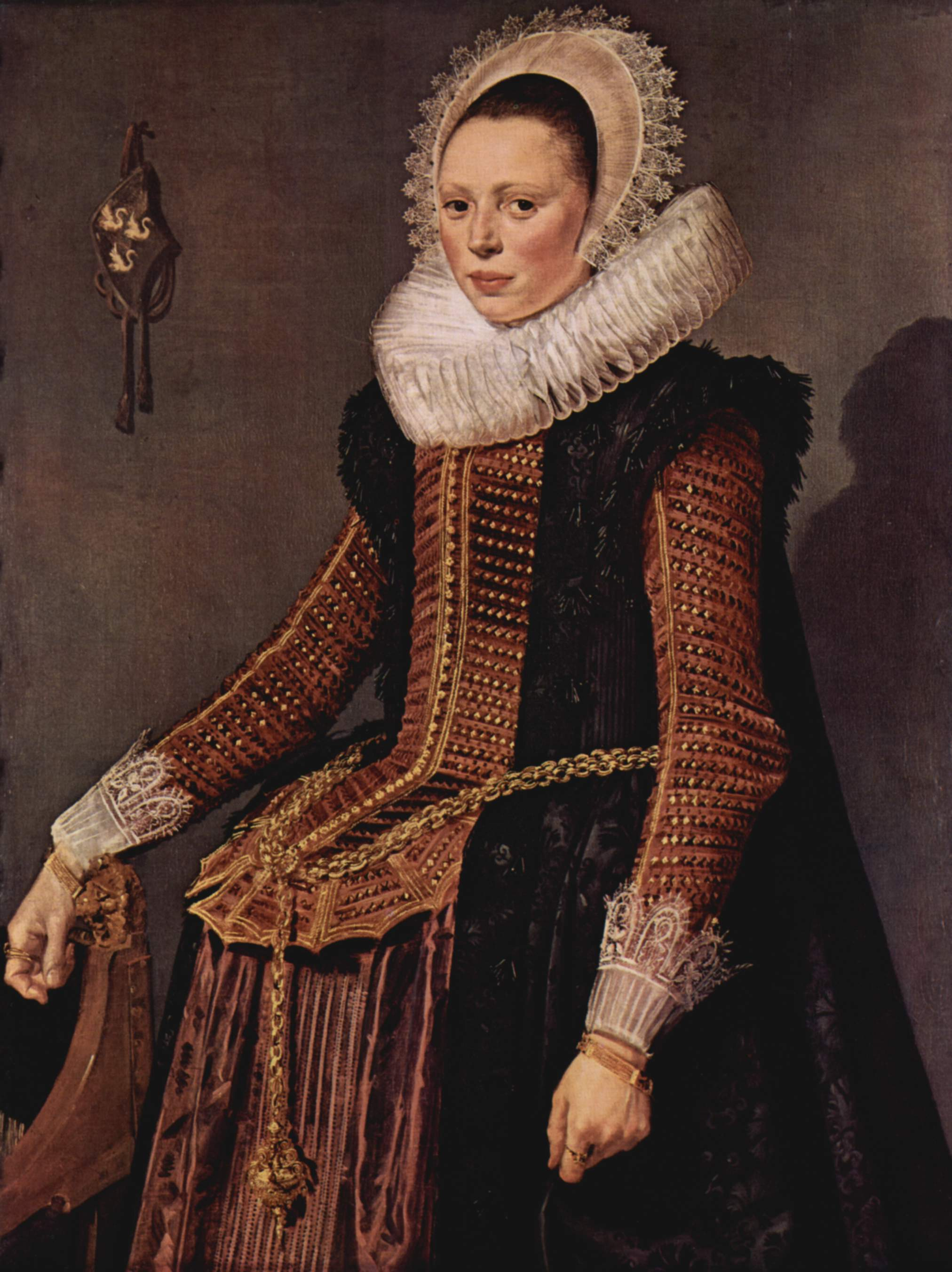
Portrait of a Woman Standing (Kassel)
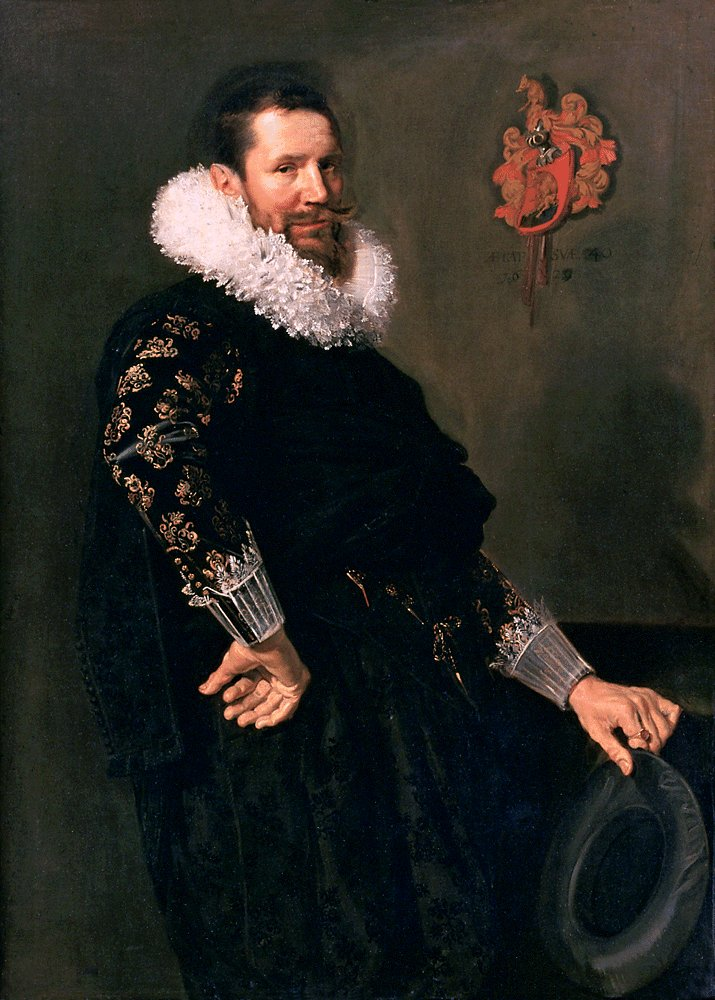
Paulus van Beresteyn

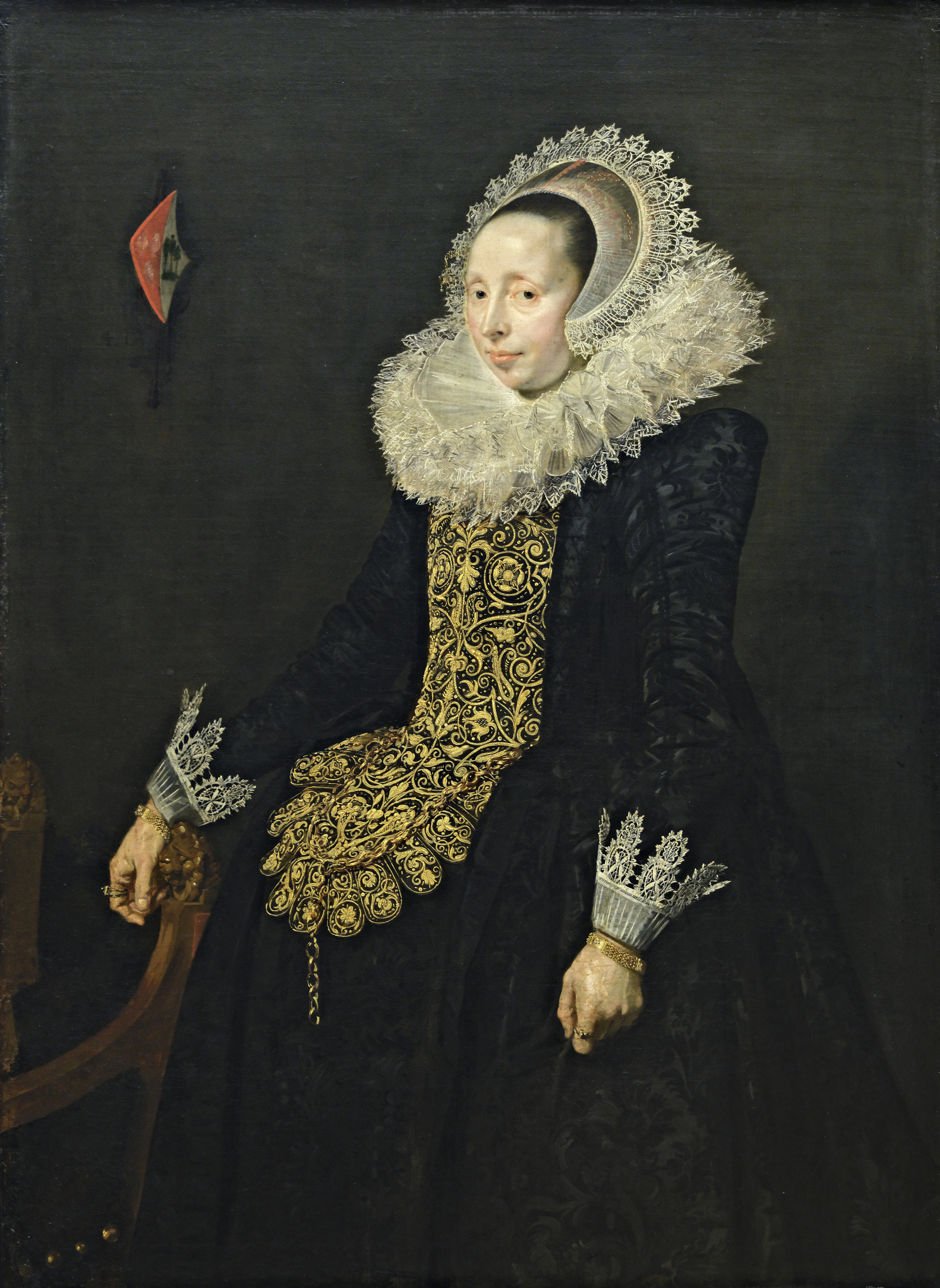
Catharina Both-van der Eem
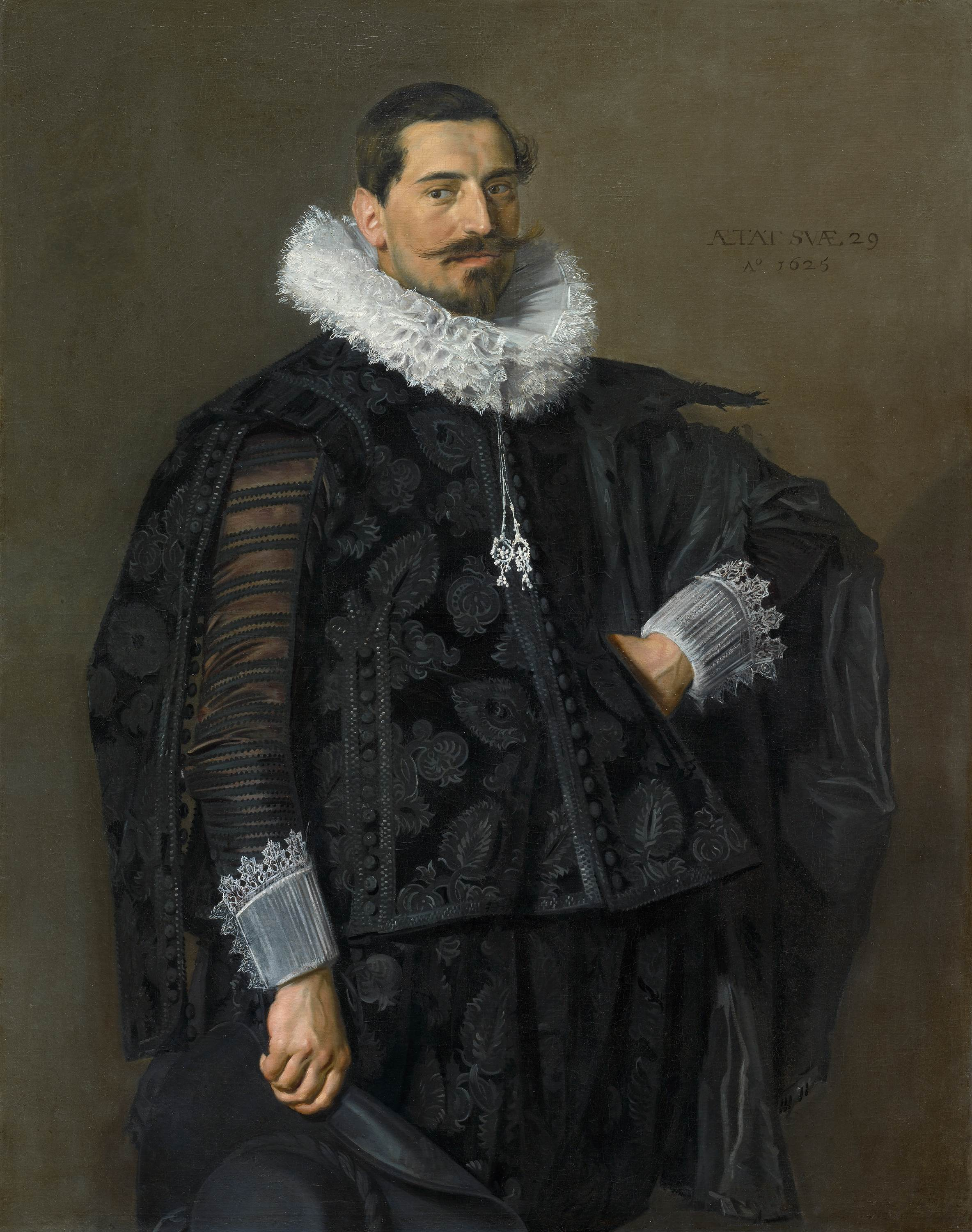
Jacob Pietersz Olycan

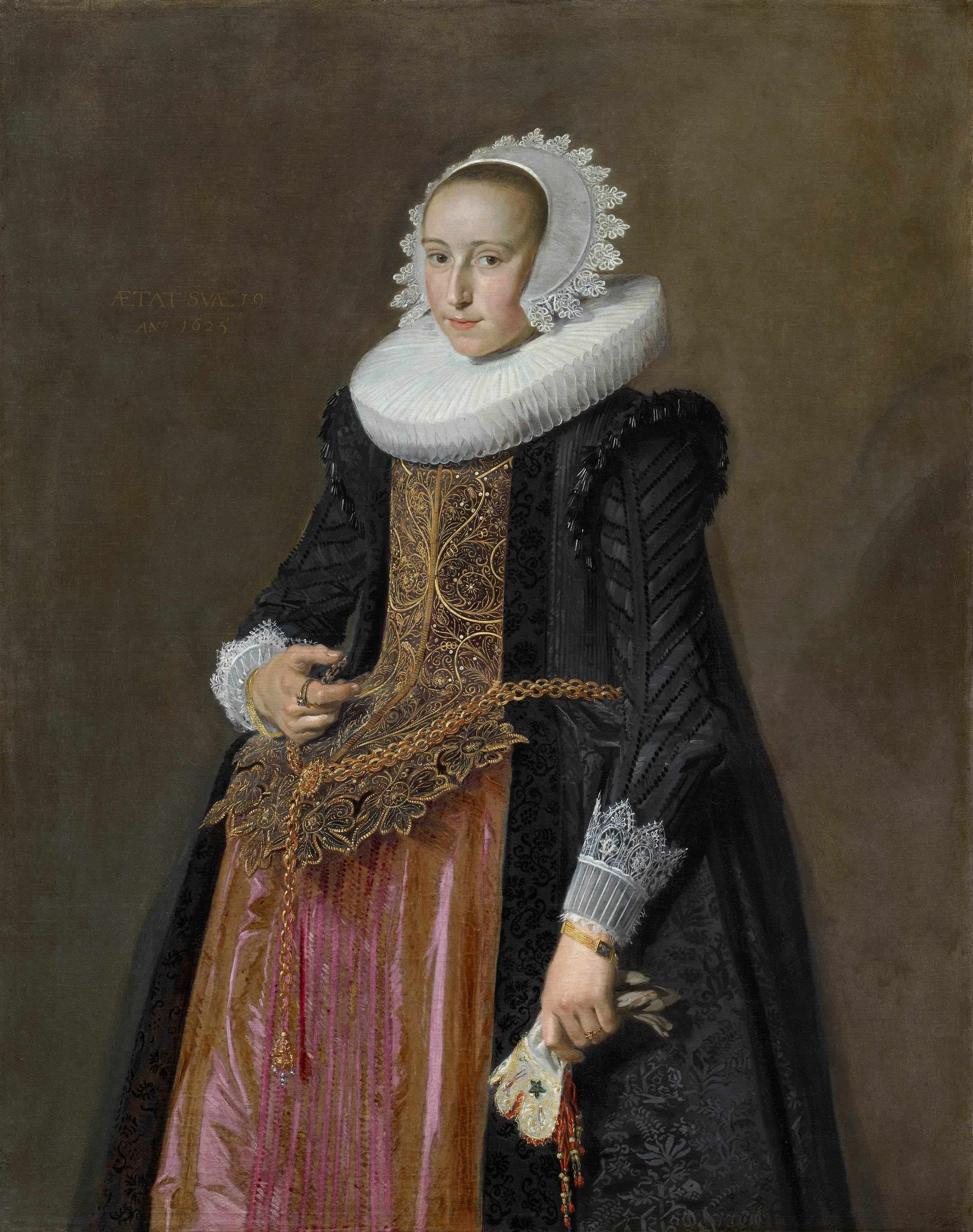
Aletta Hannemans
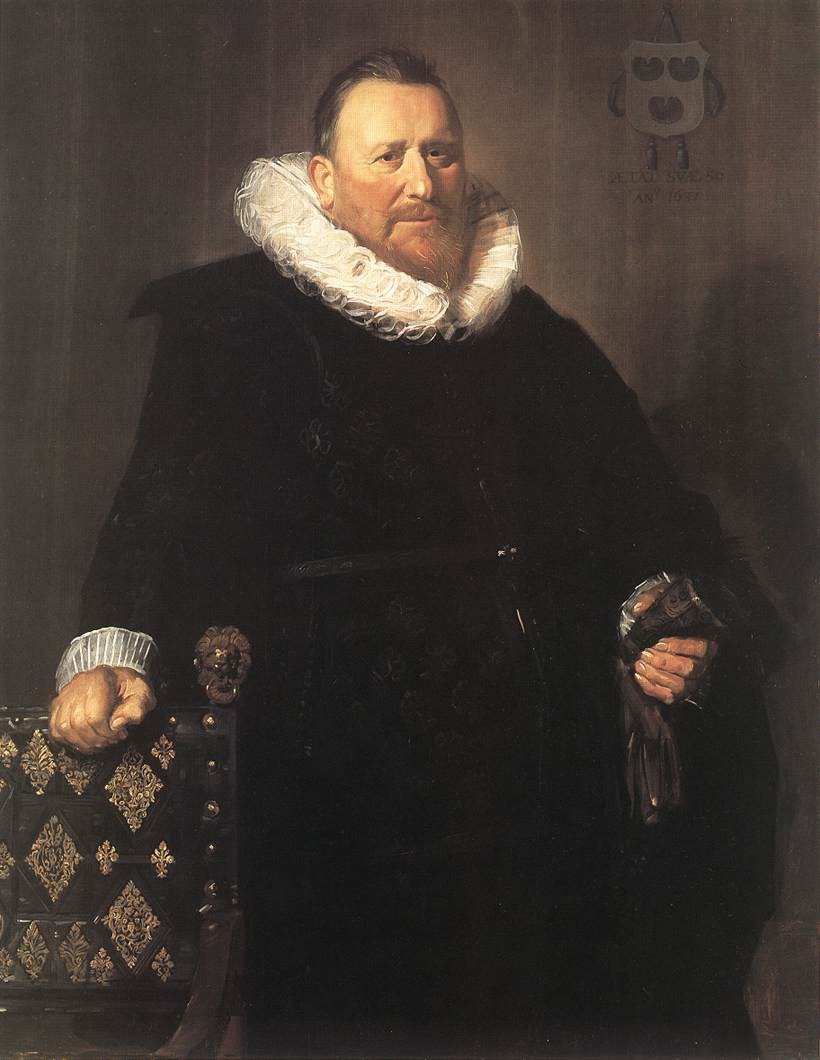
Nicolaes Woutersz van der Meer

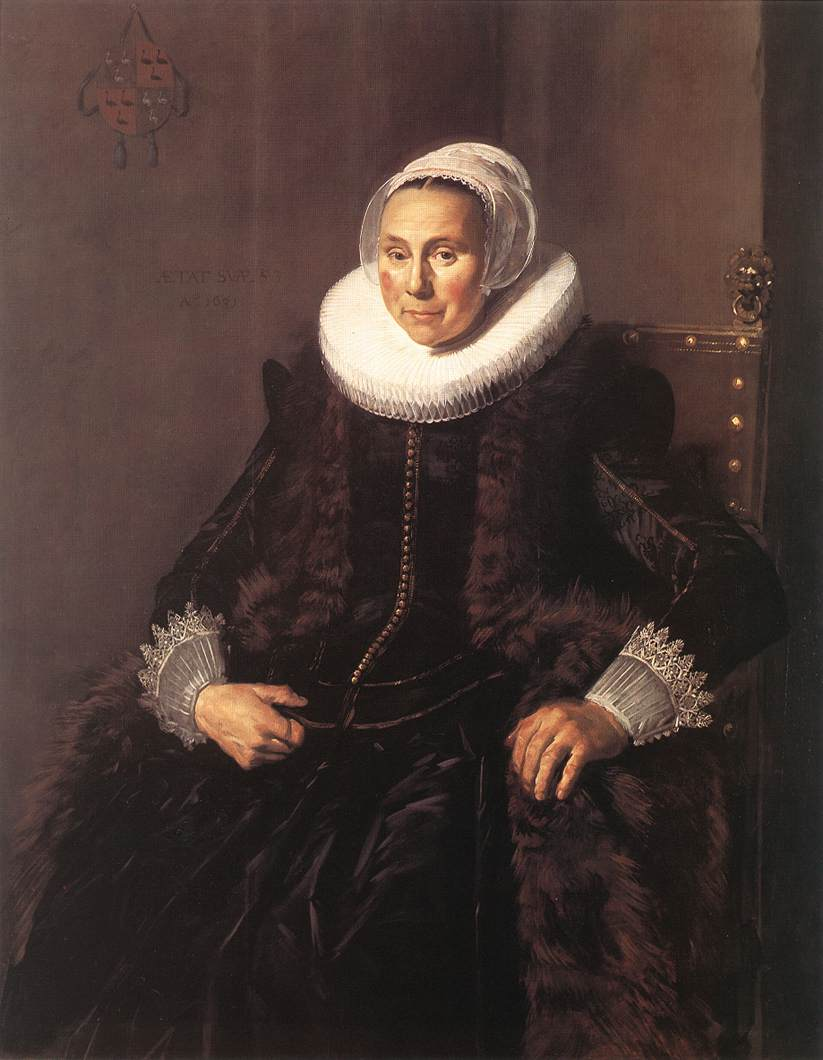
Cornelia Claesdr Voogt
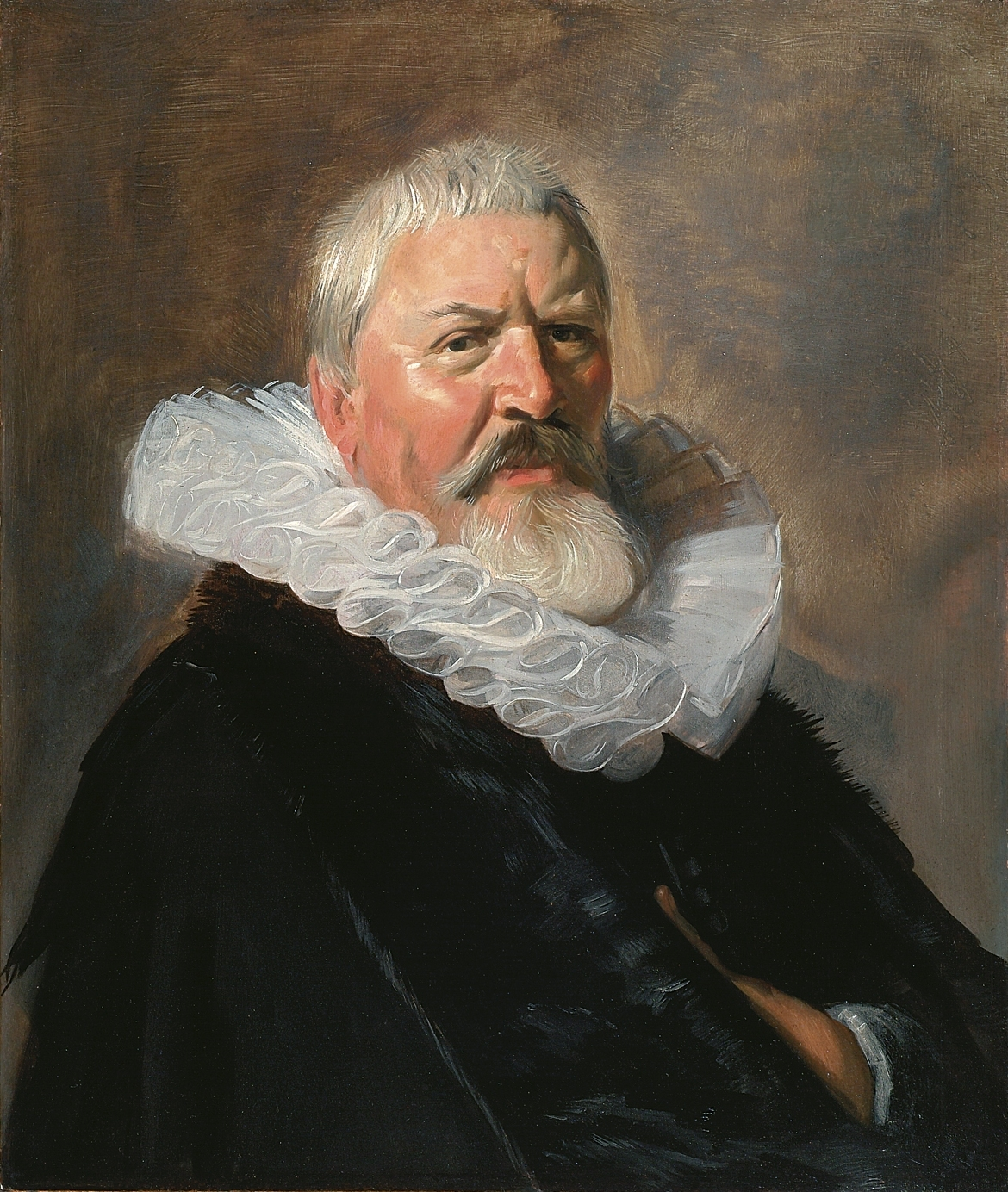
Pieter Jacobsz Olycan

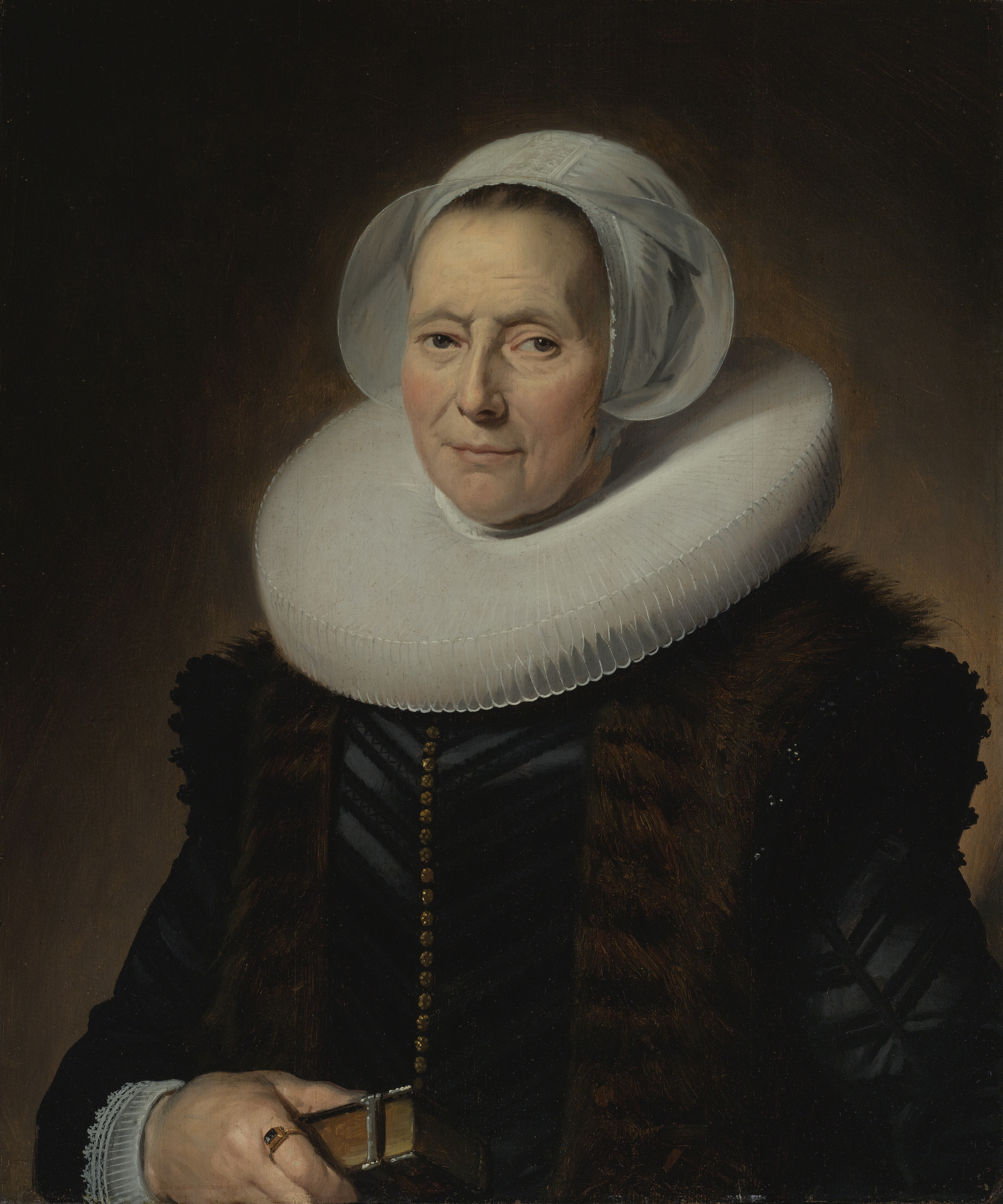
Maritge Claesdr. Voogt
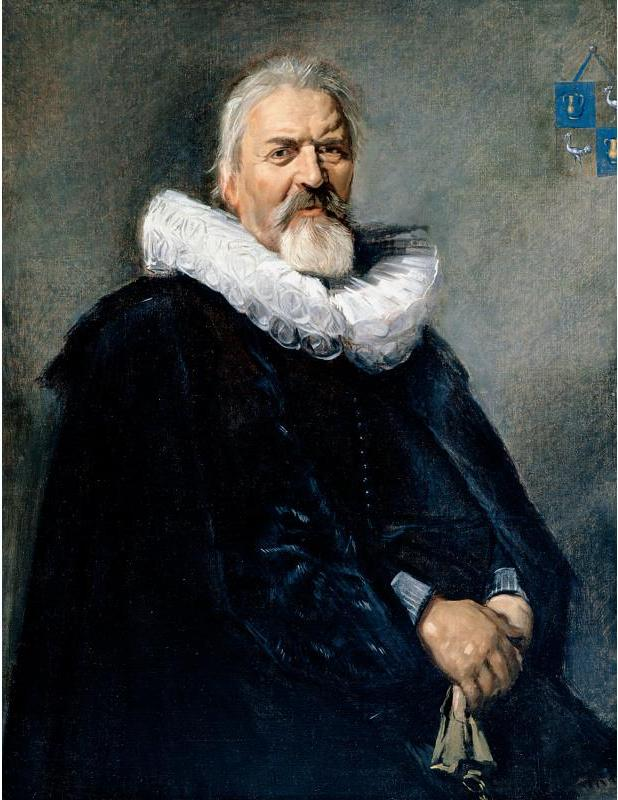
Pieter Jacobsz Olycan

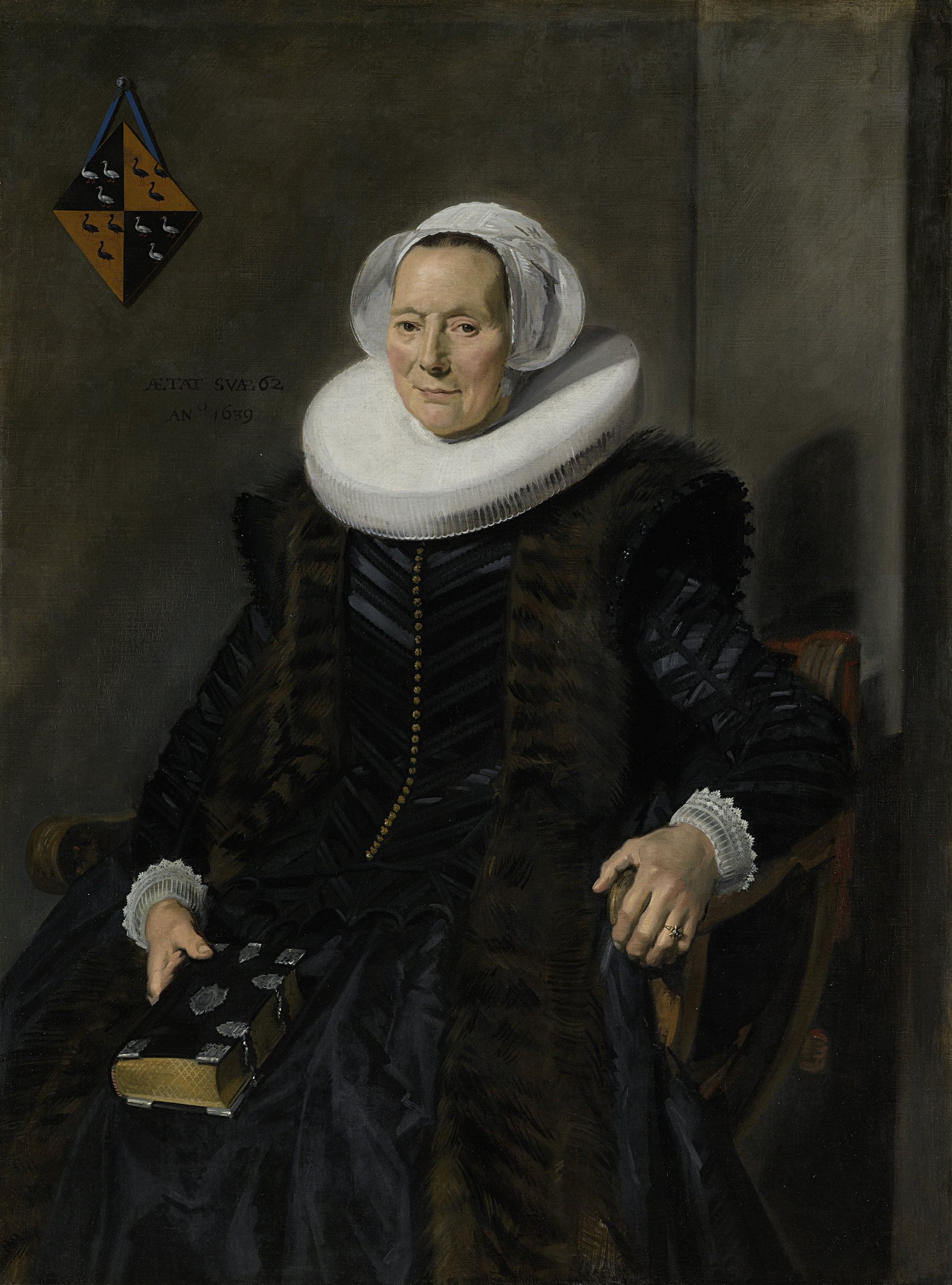
Maritge Claesdr. Voogt
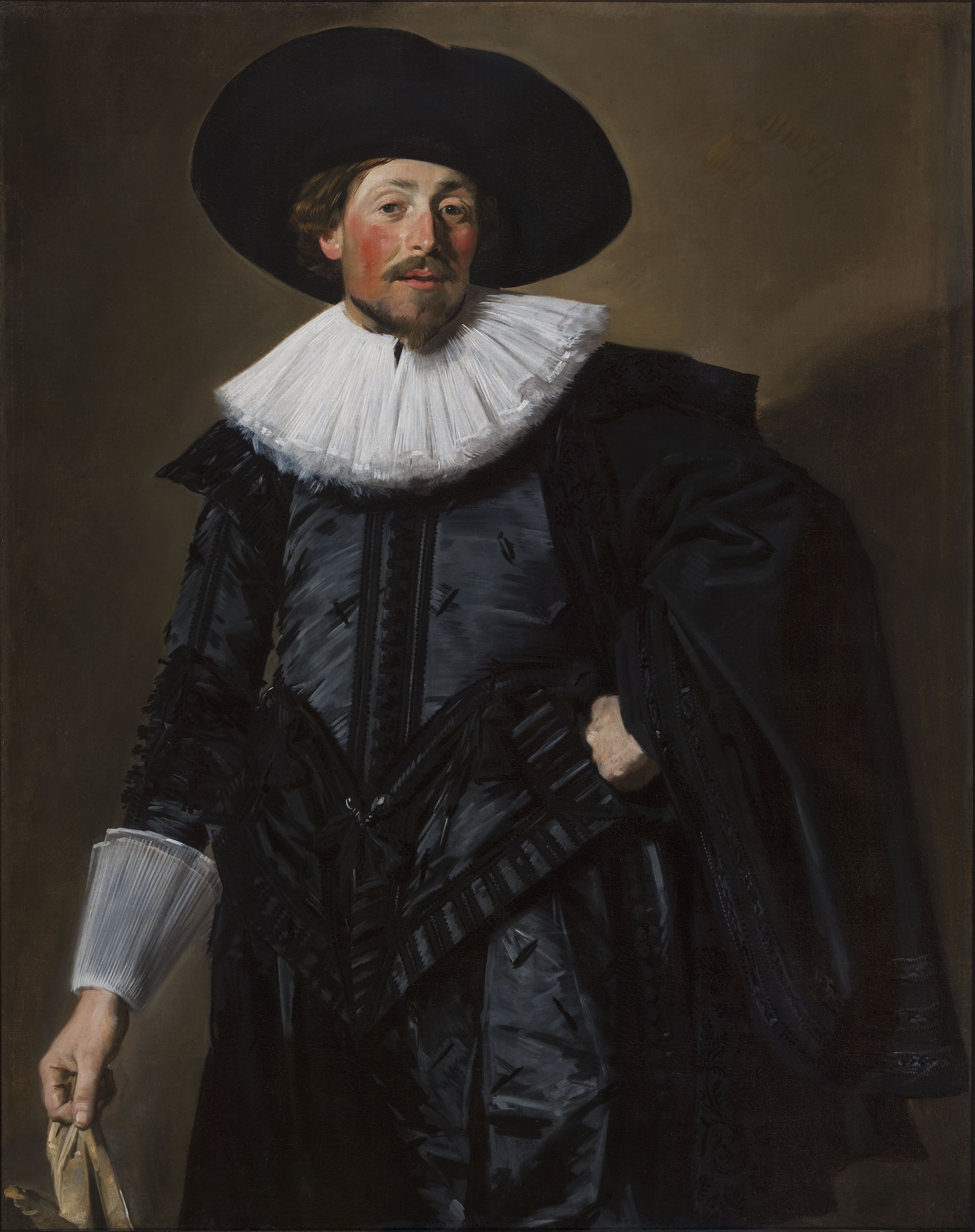
Michiel de Wael

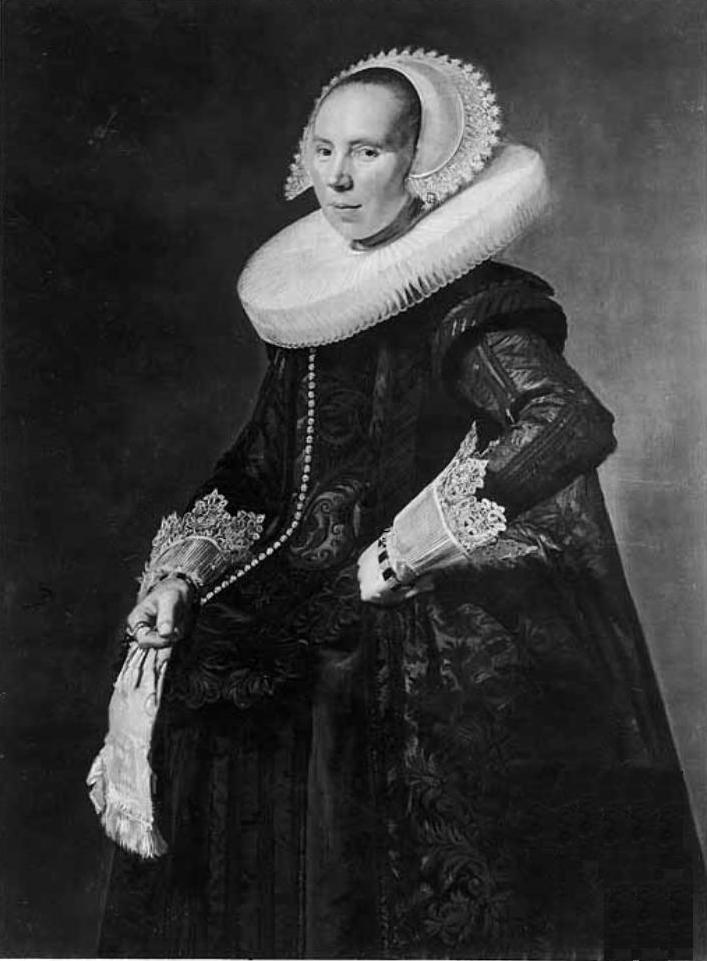
Cunera van Baersdorp
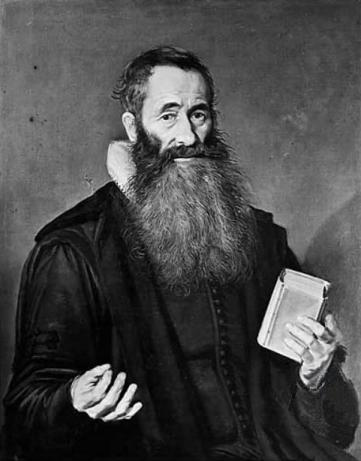
Michiel Jansz van Middelhoven

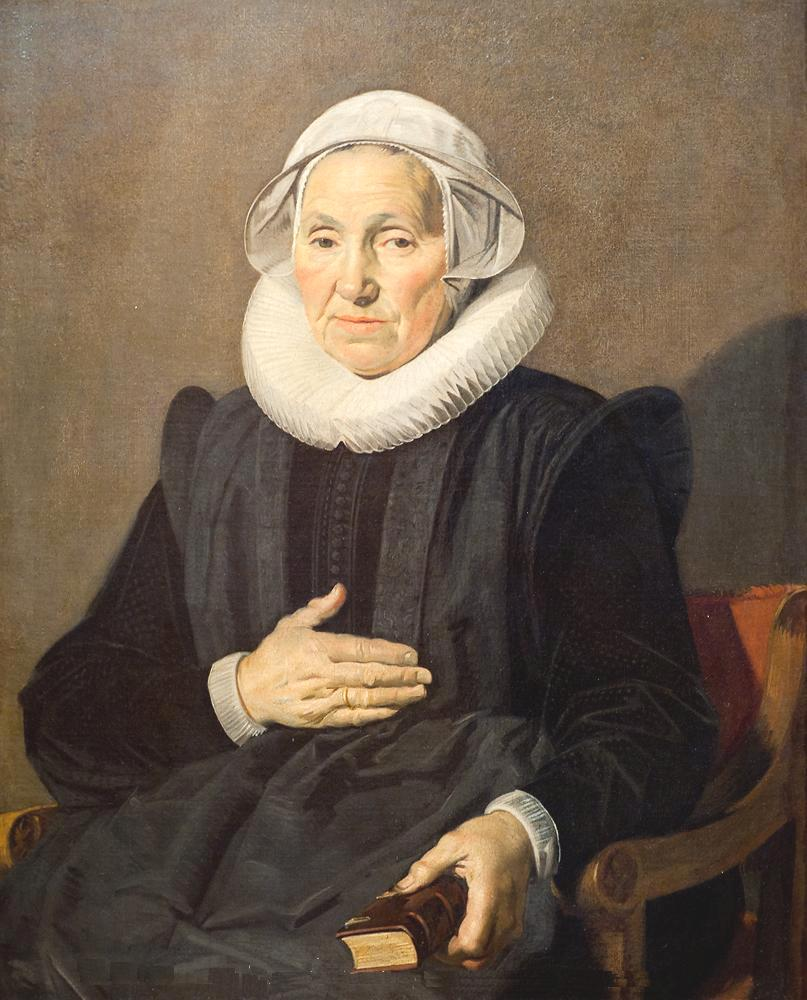
Sara Andriesdr Hessix
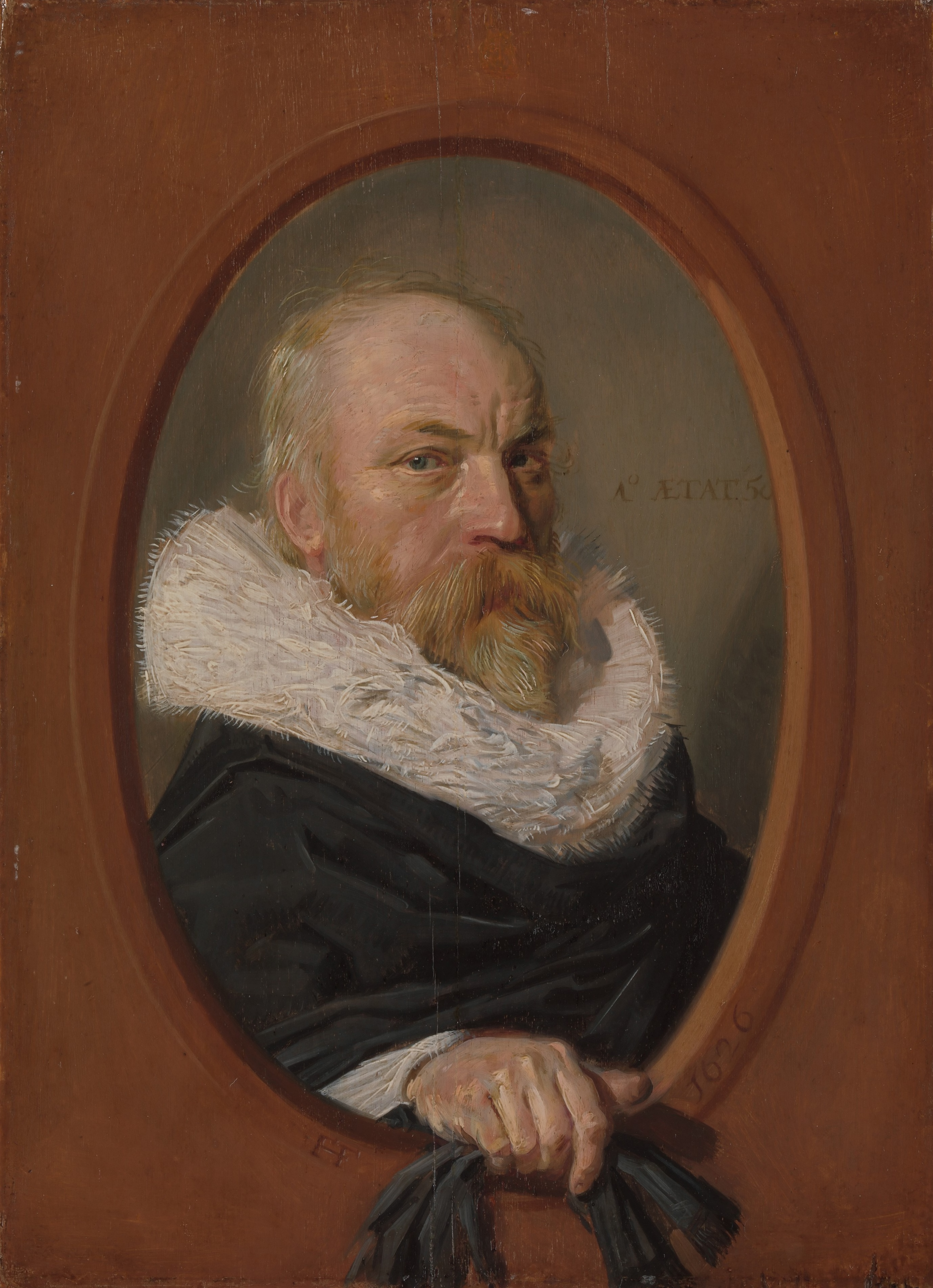
Petrus Scriverius

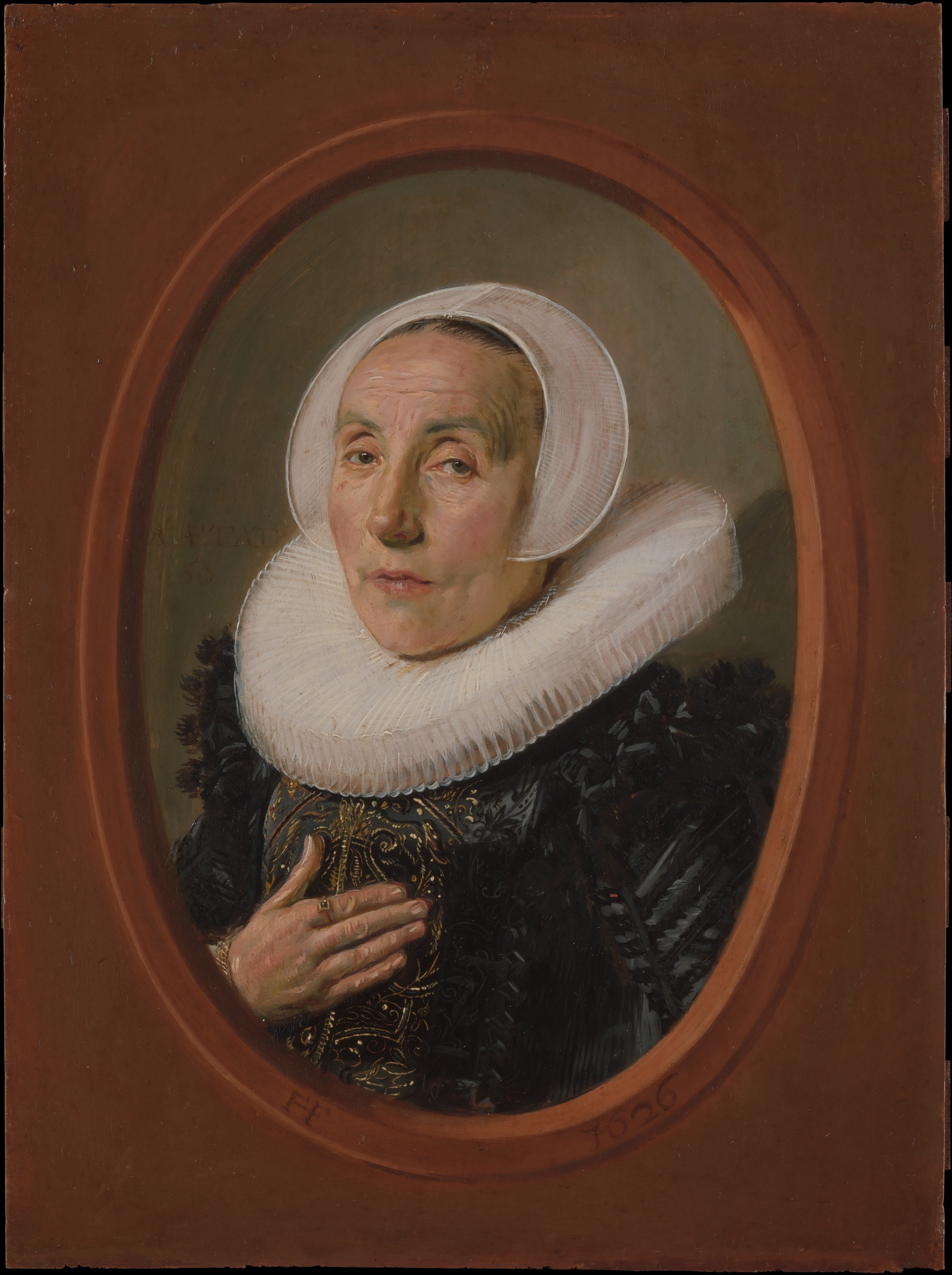
Anna van der Aar
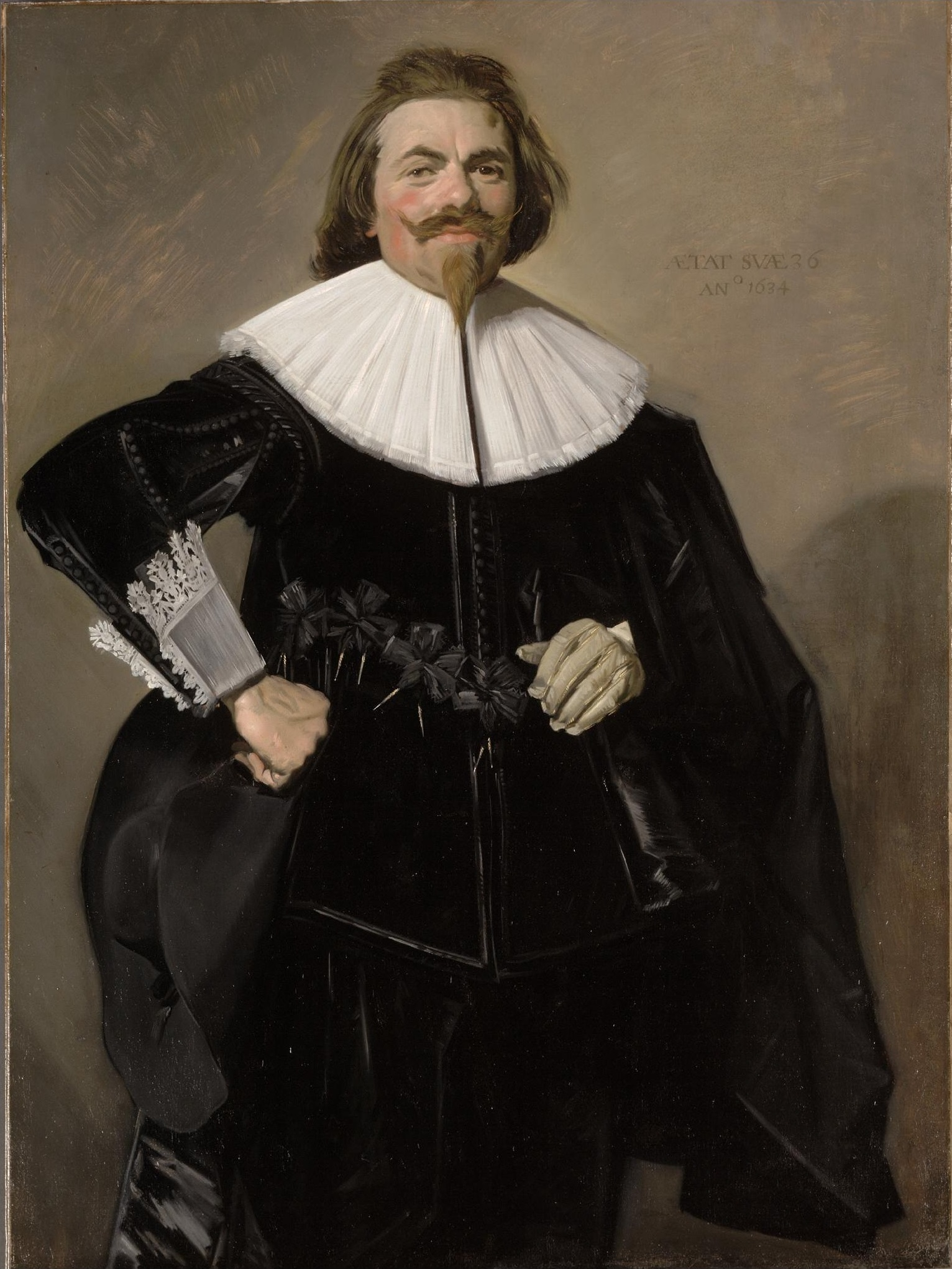
Tieleman Roosterman

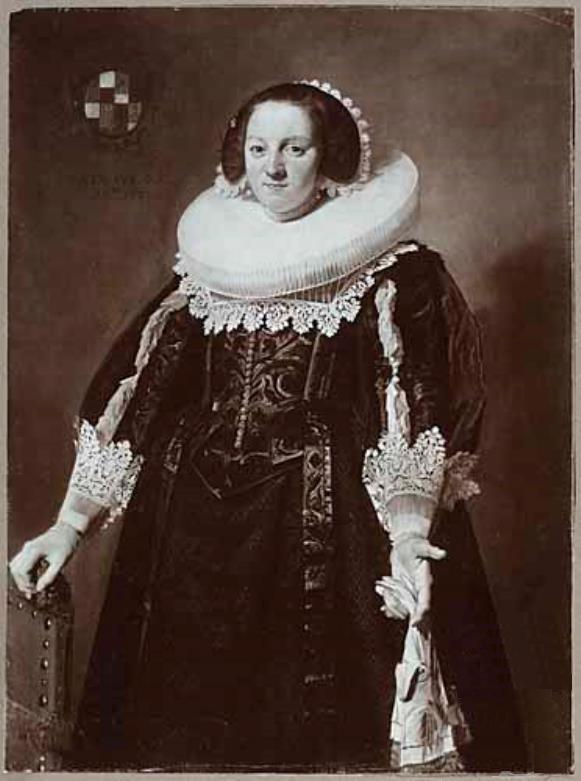
Catharina Brugmans
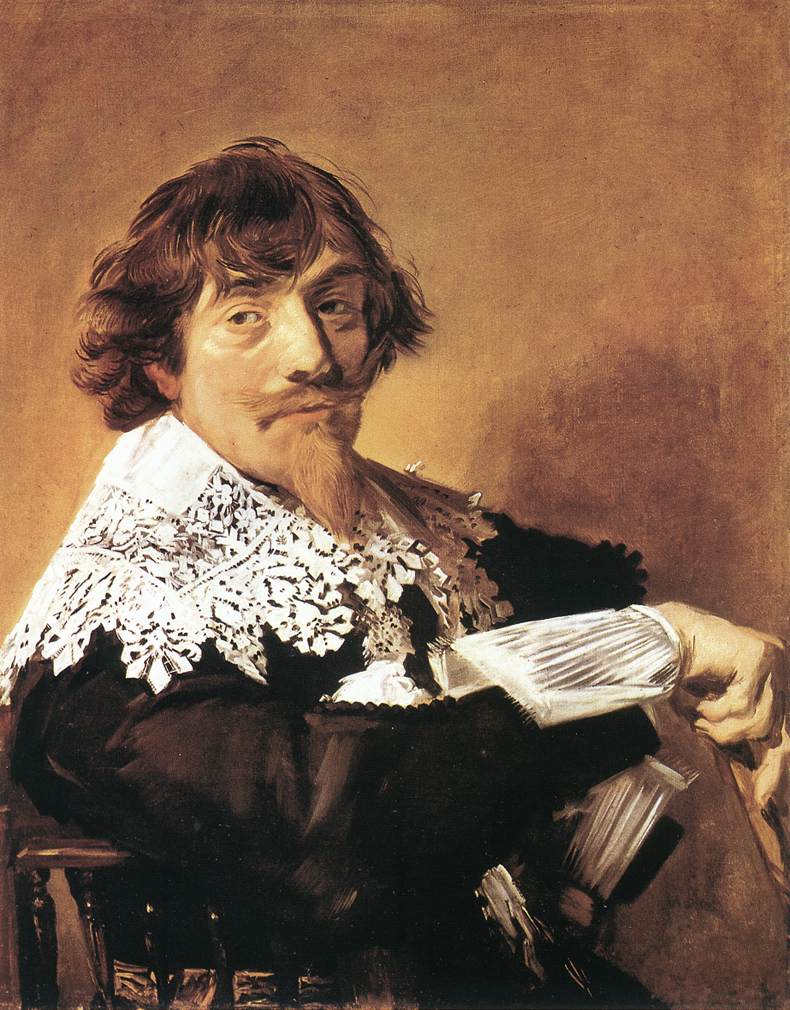
Nicolaes Hasselaer

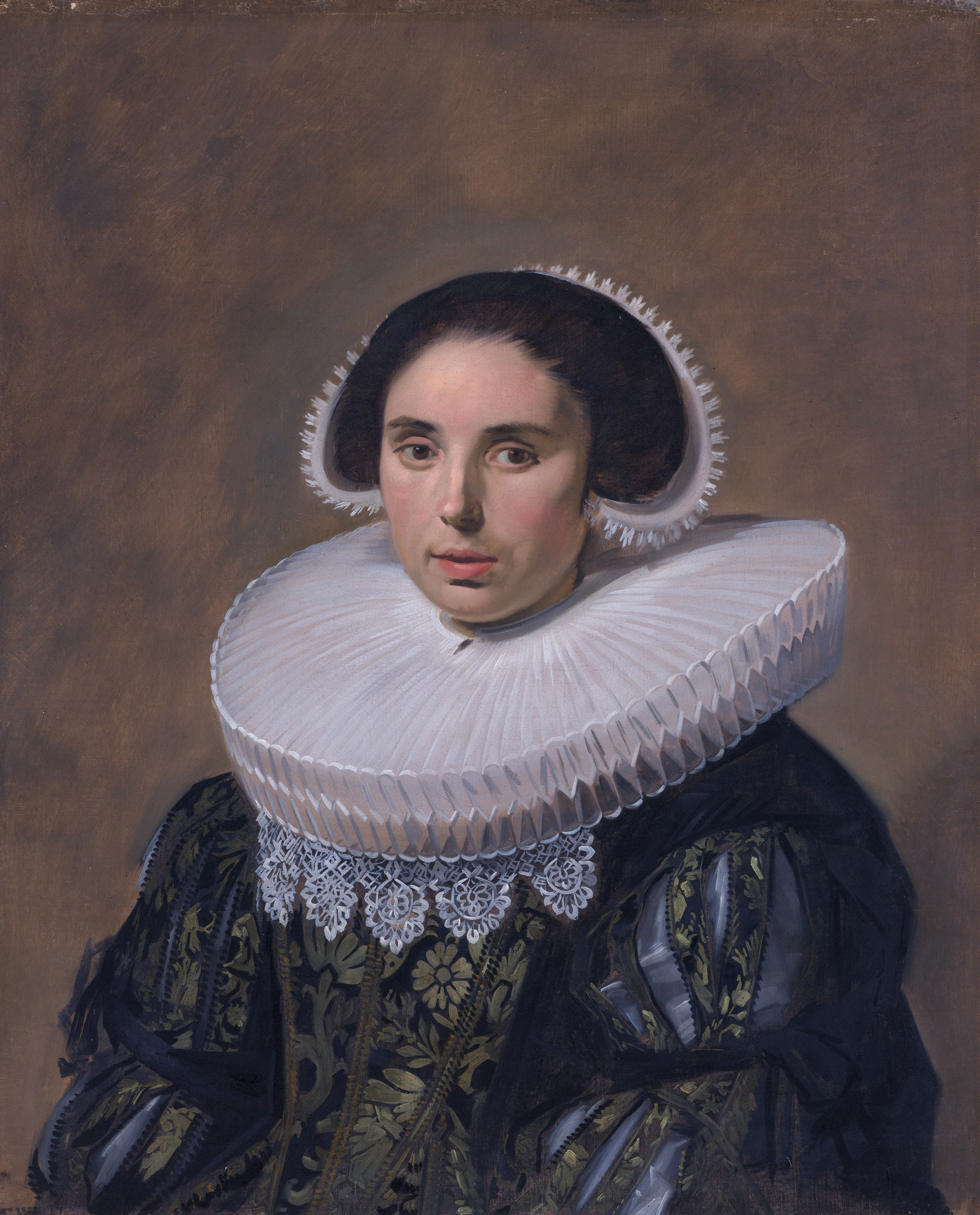
Sara Wolphaerts van Diemen
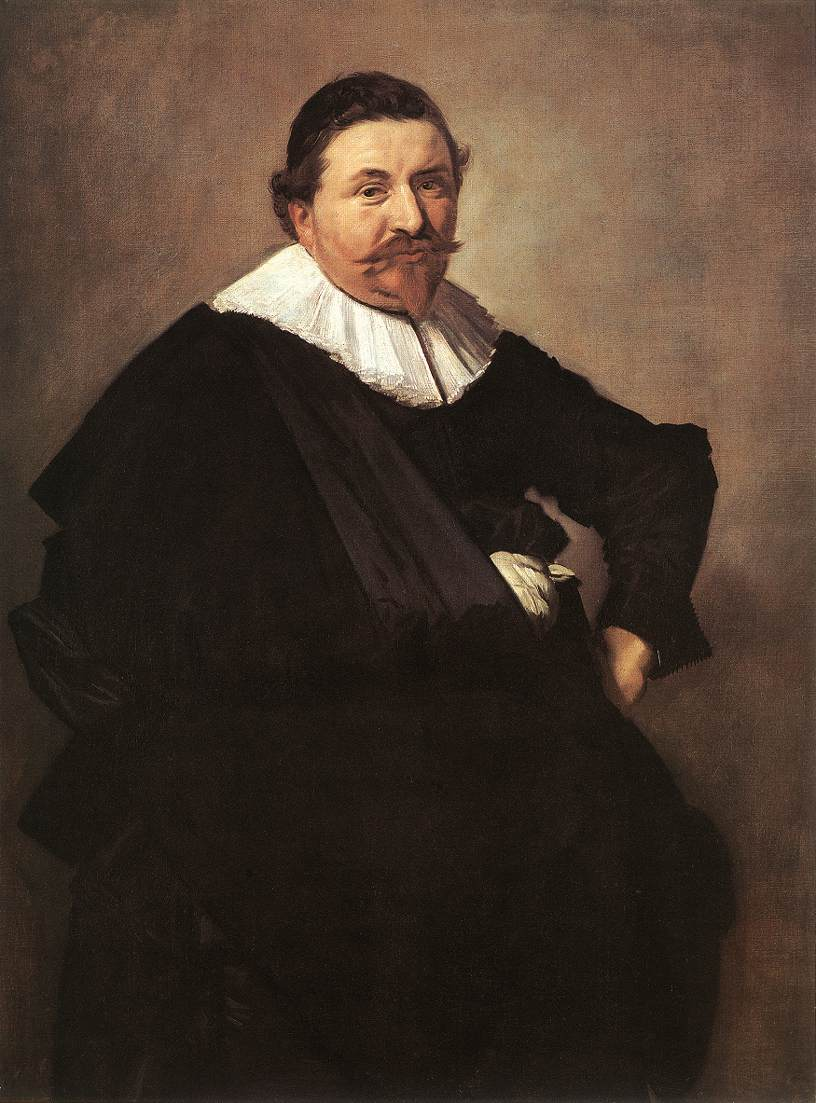
Lucas de Clercq

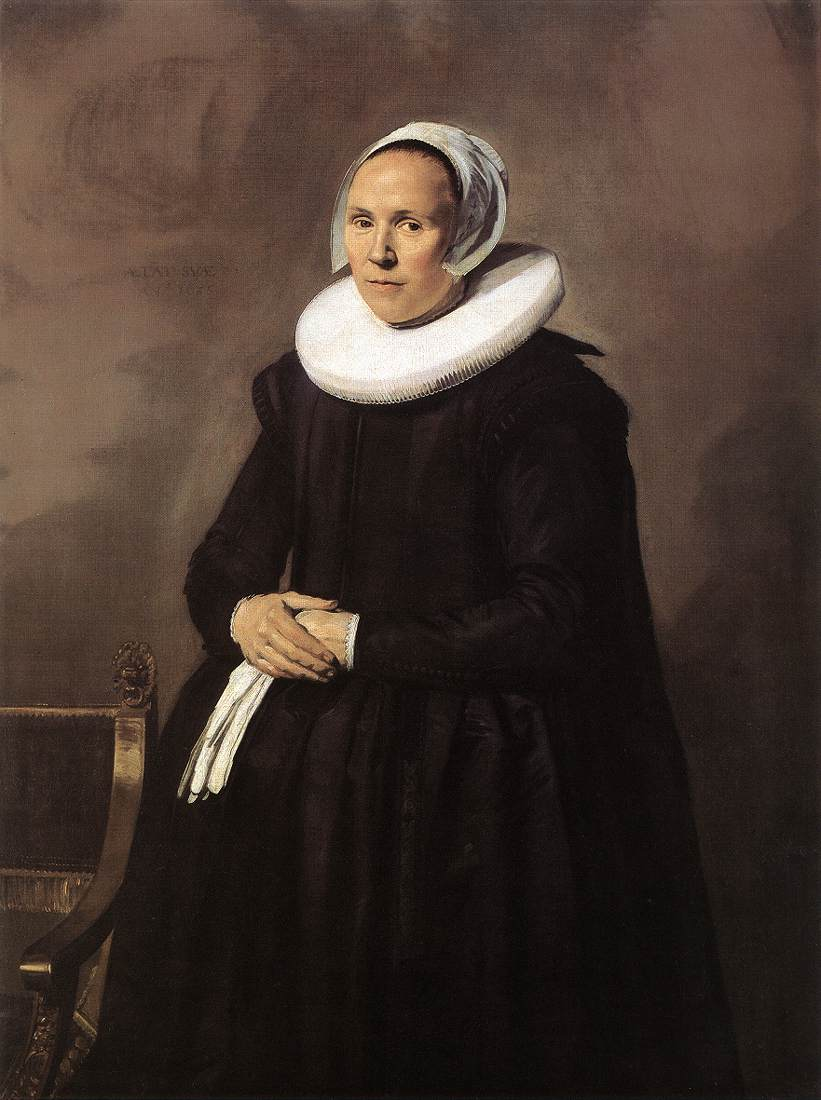
Feyntje van Steenkiste
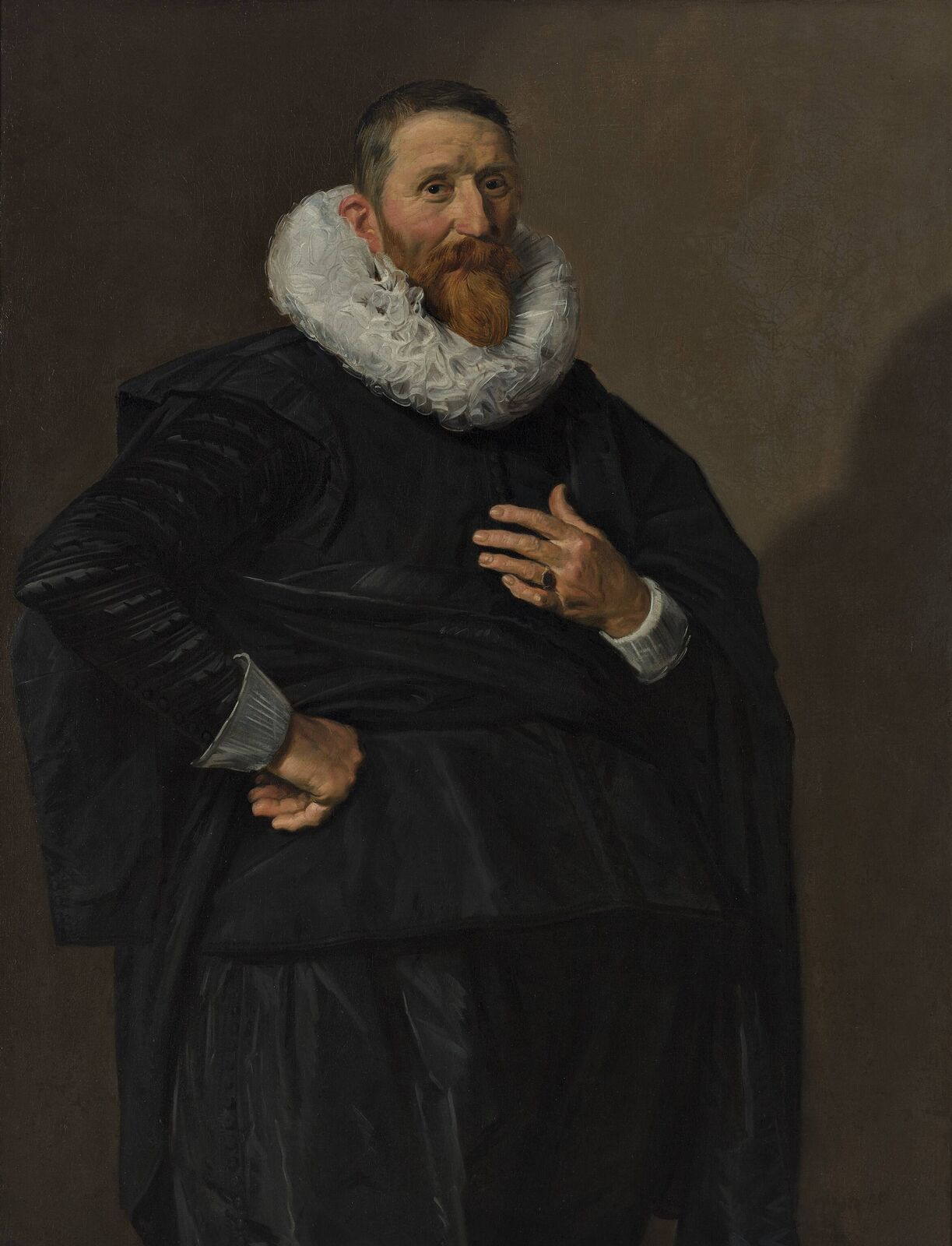
Johannes Saeckma

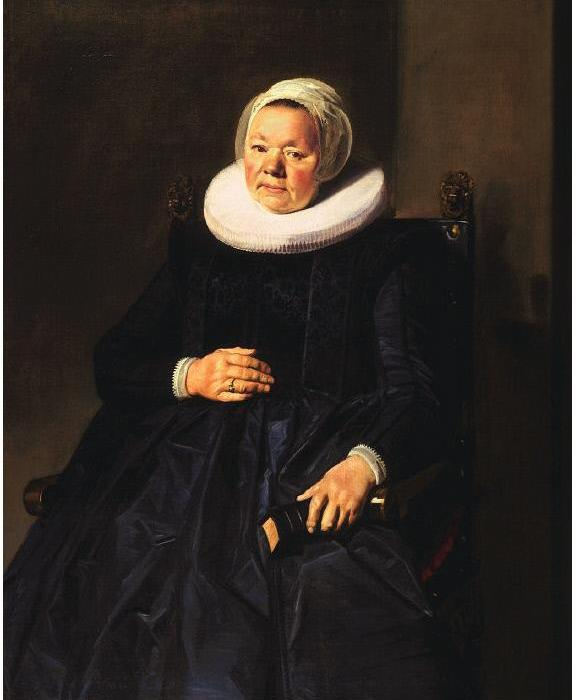
Hylck Boner
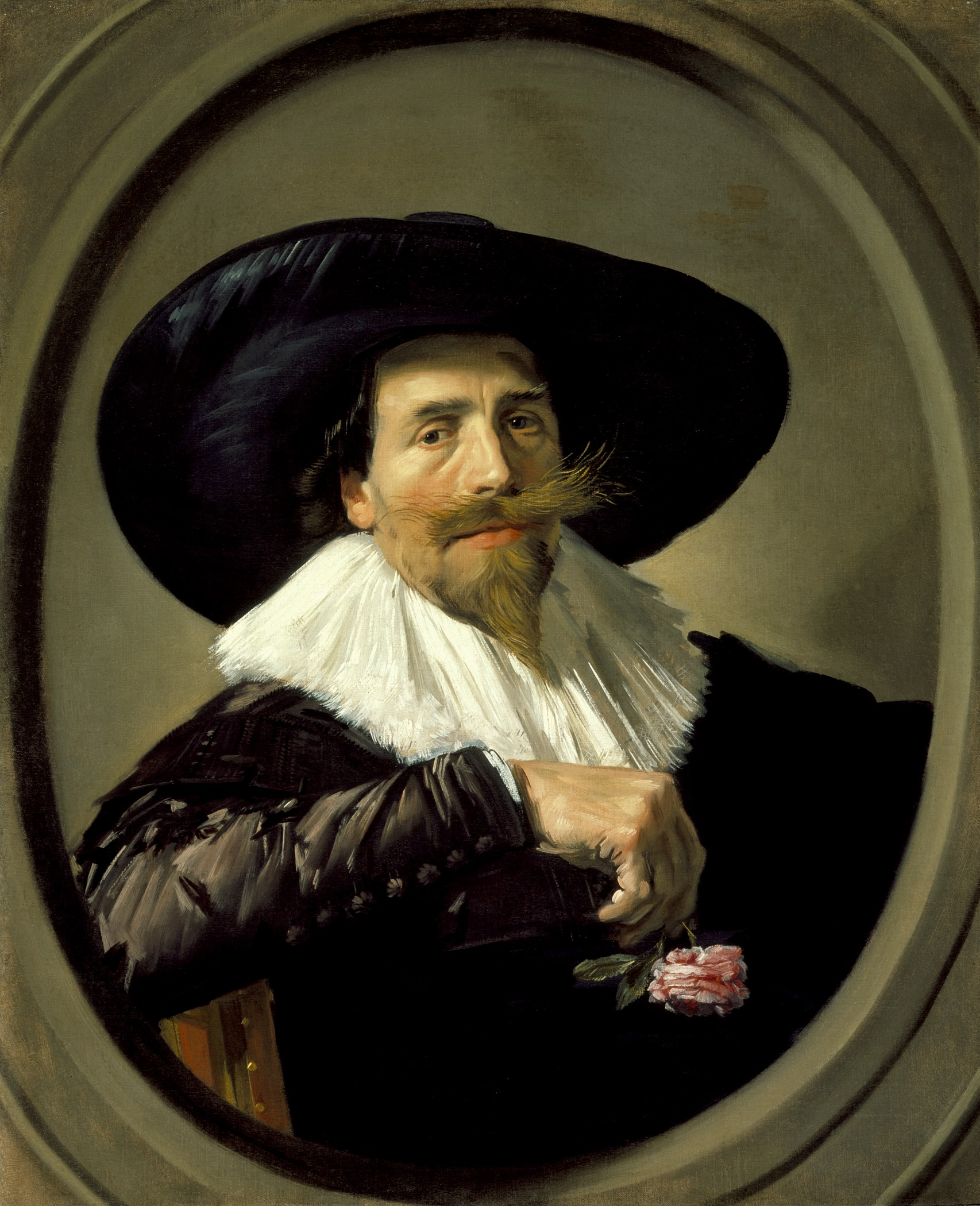
Pieter Tjarck

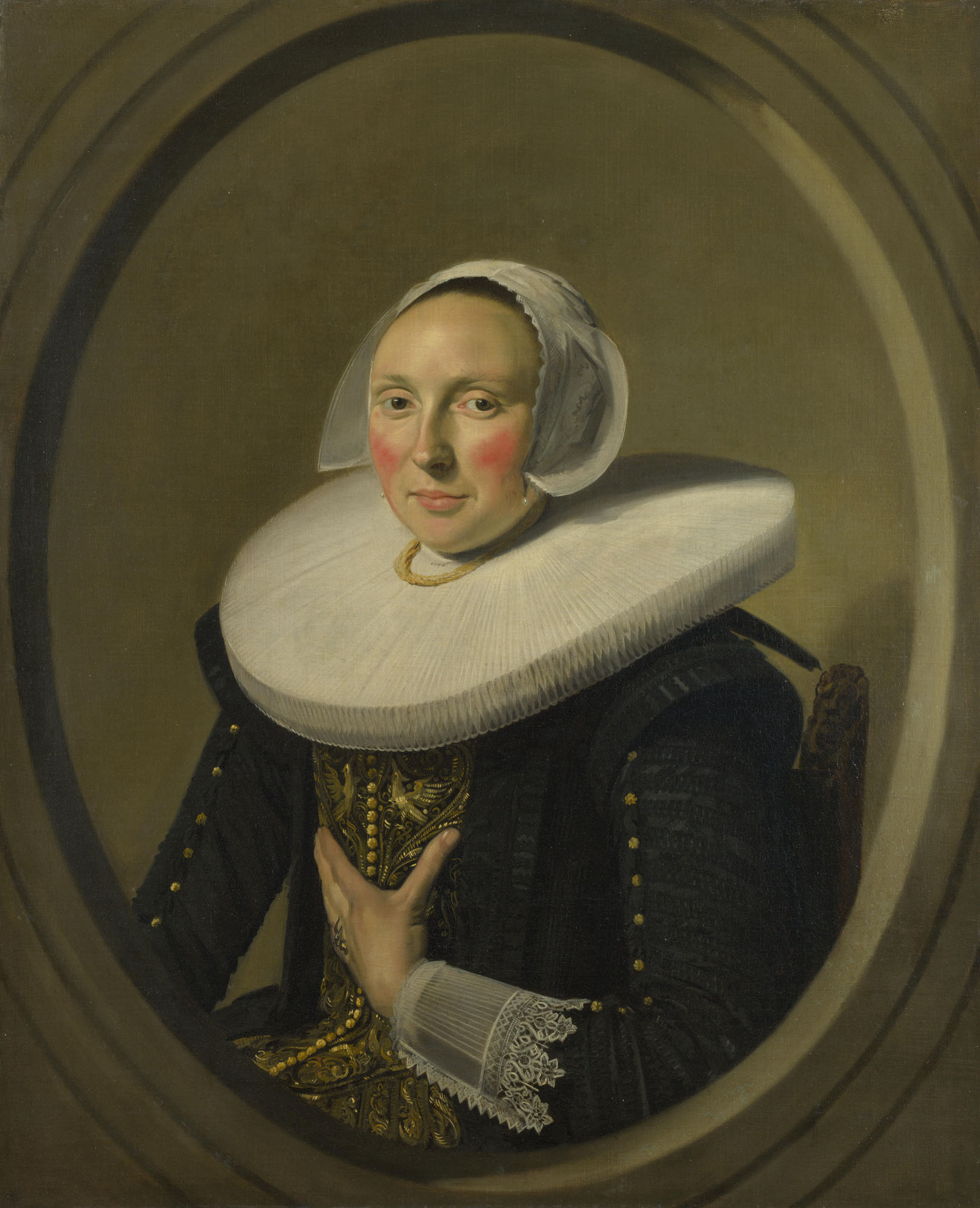
Maria Larp
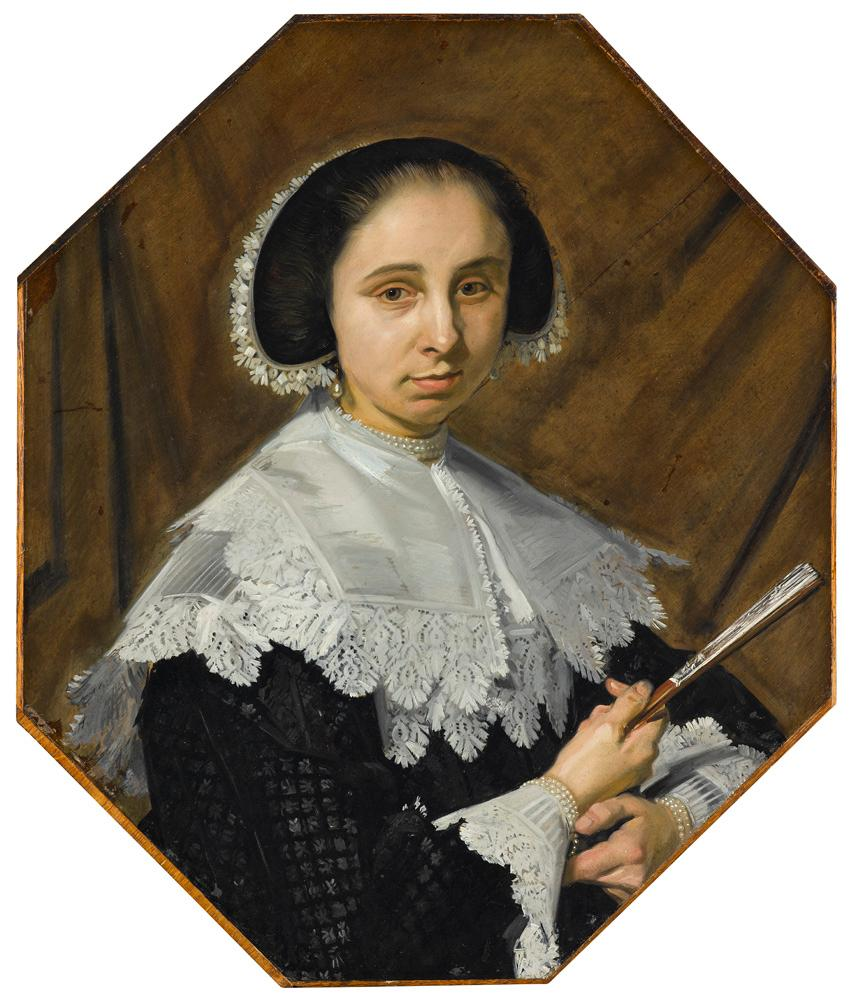
Portrait of a woman in 8 sided frame

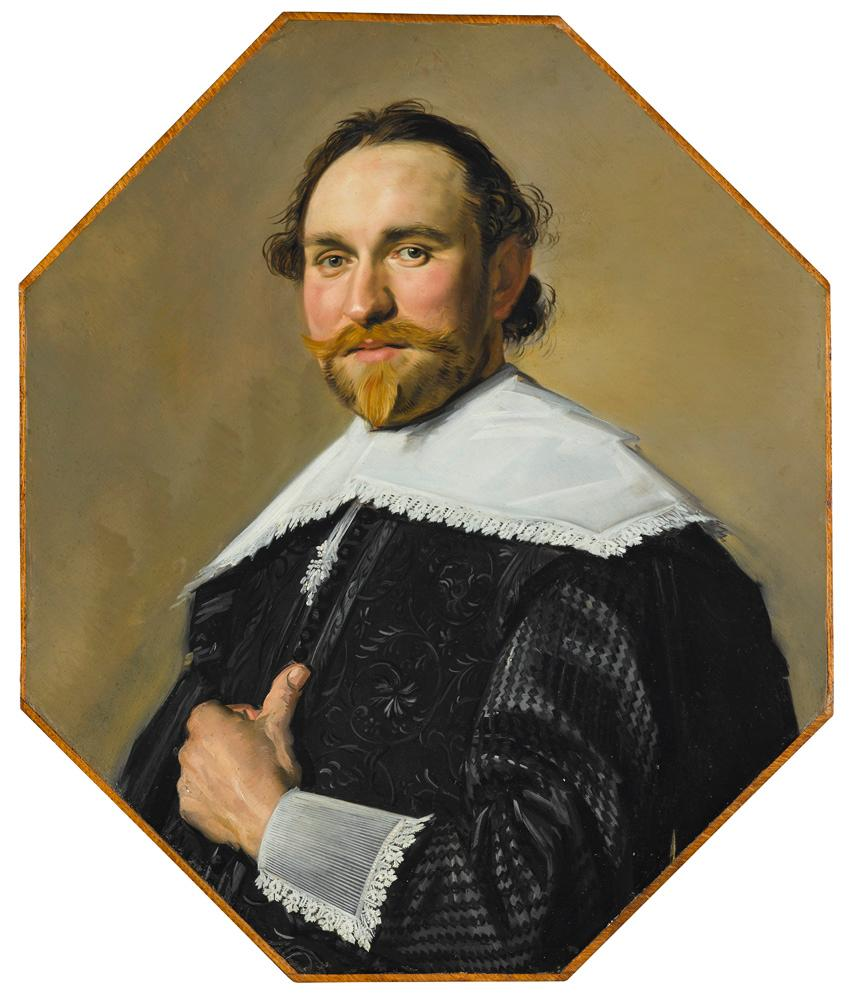
Portrait of a man in 8 sided frame
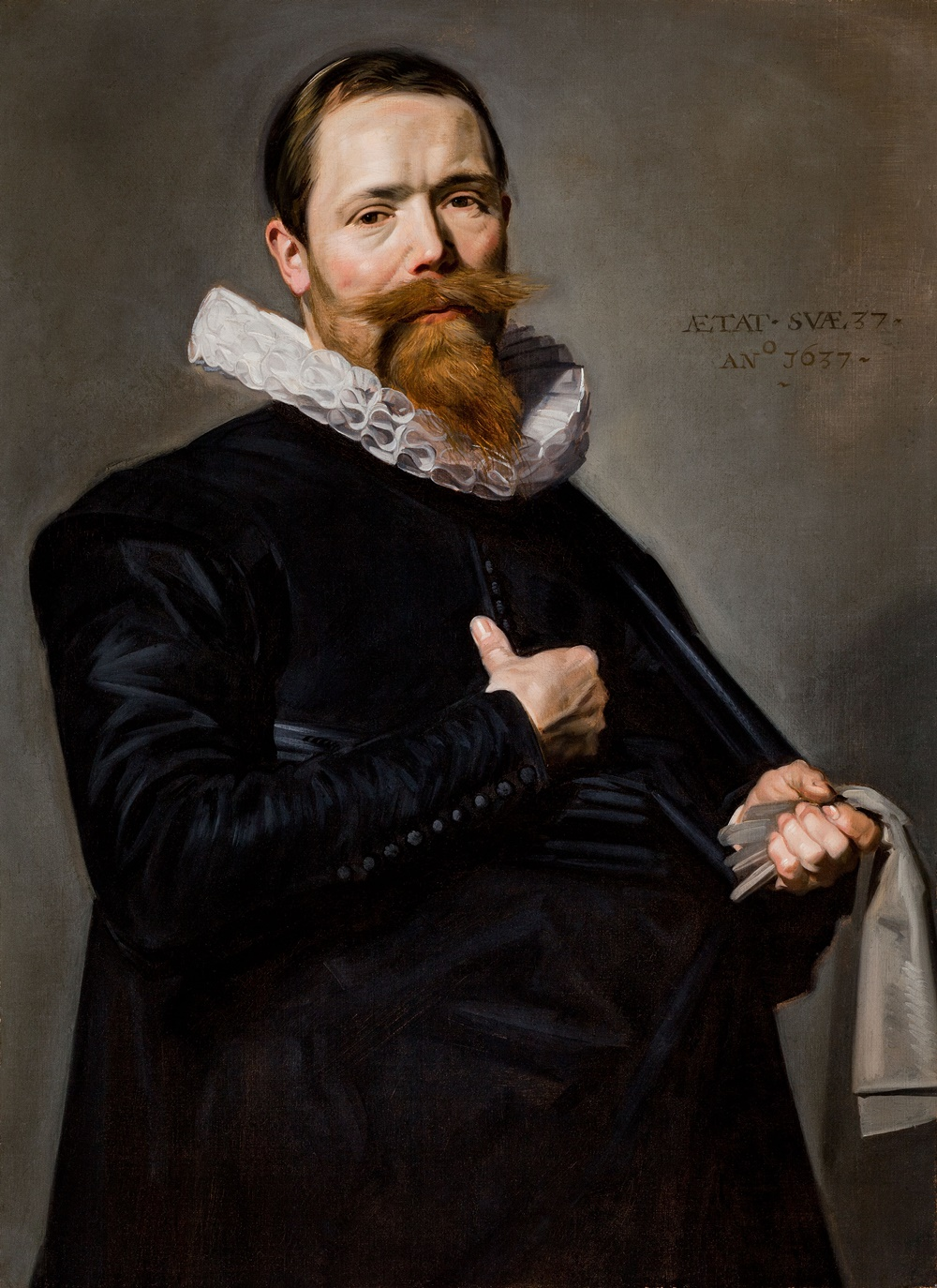
Portrait of a man with glove in left hand

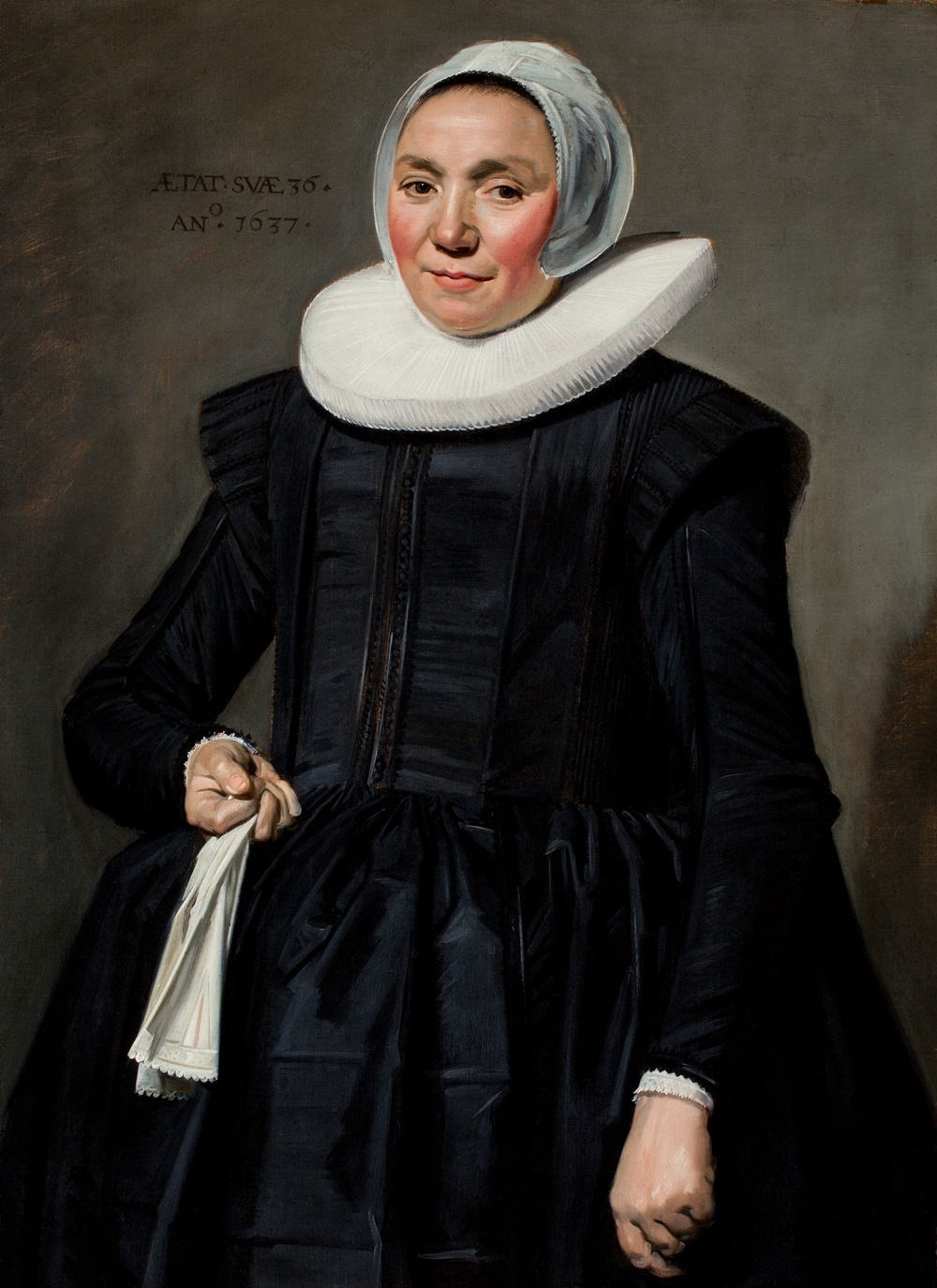
Portrait of a woman with glove in right hand
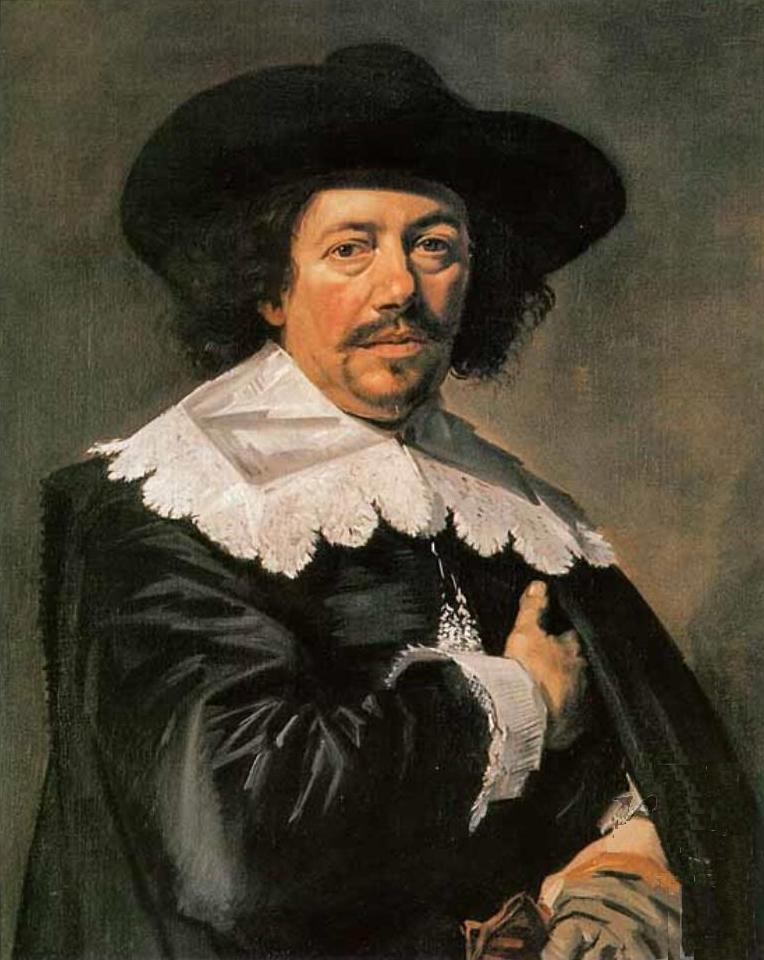
Johan de Wael

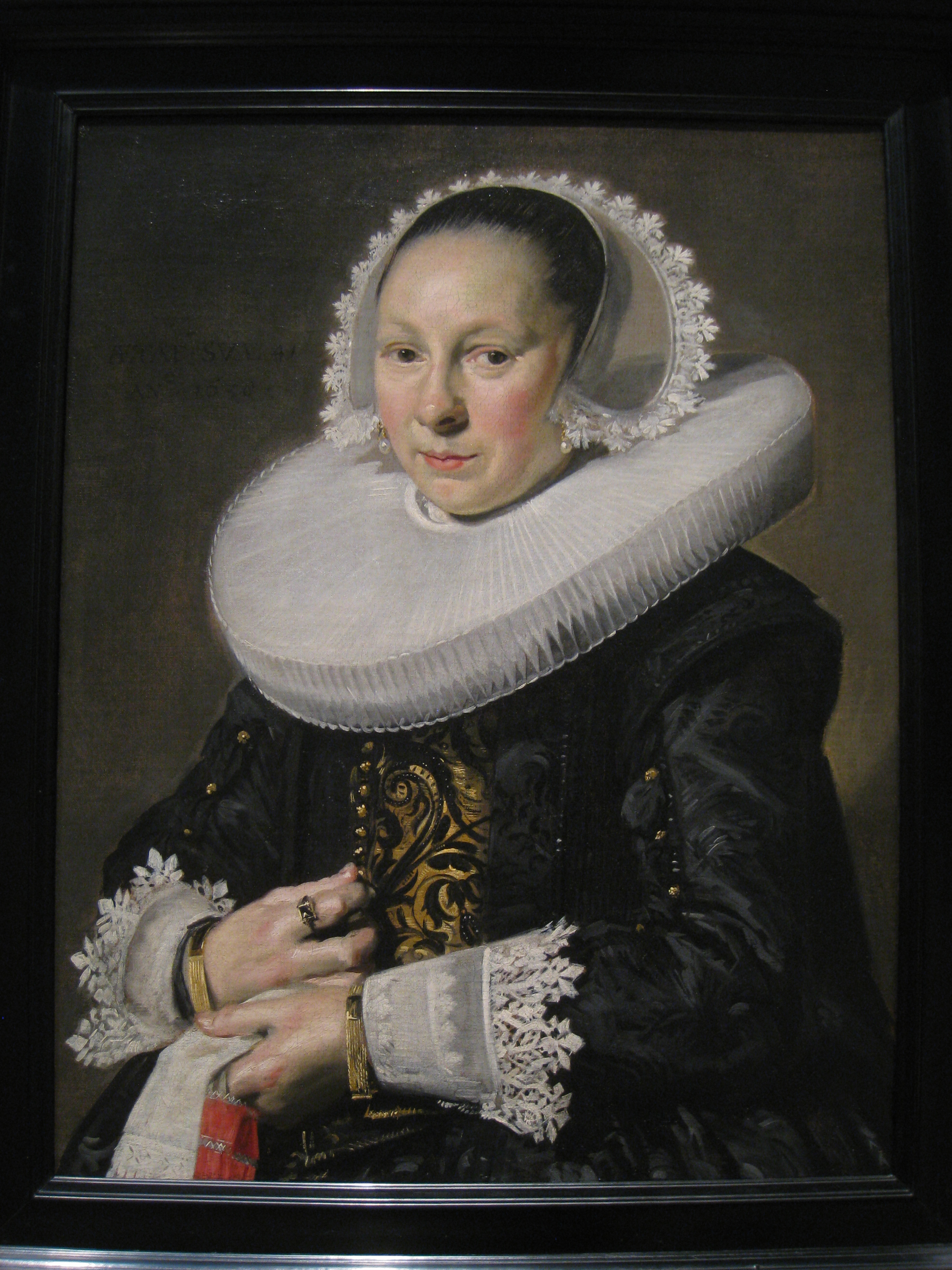
Aeltje Pater
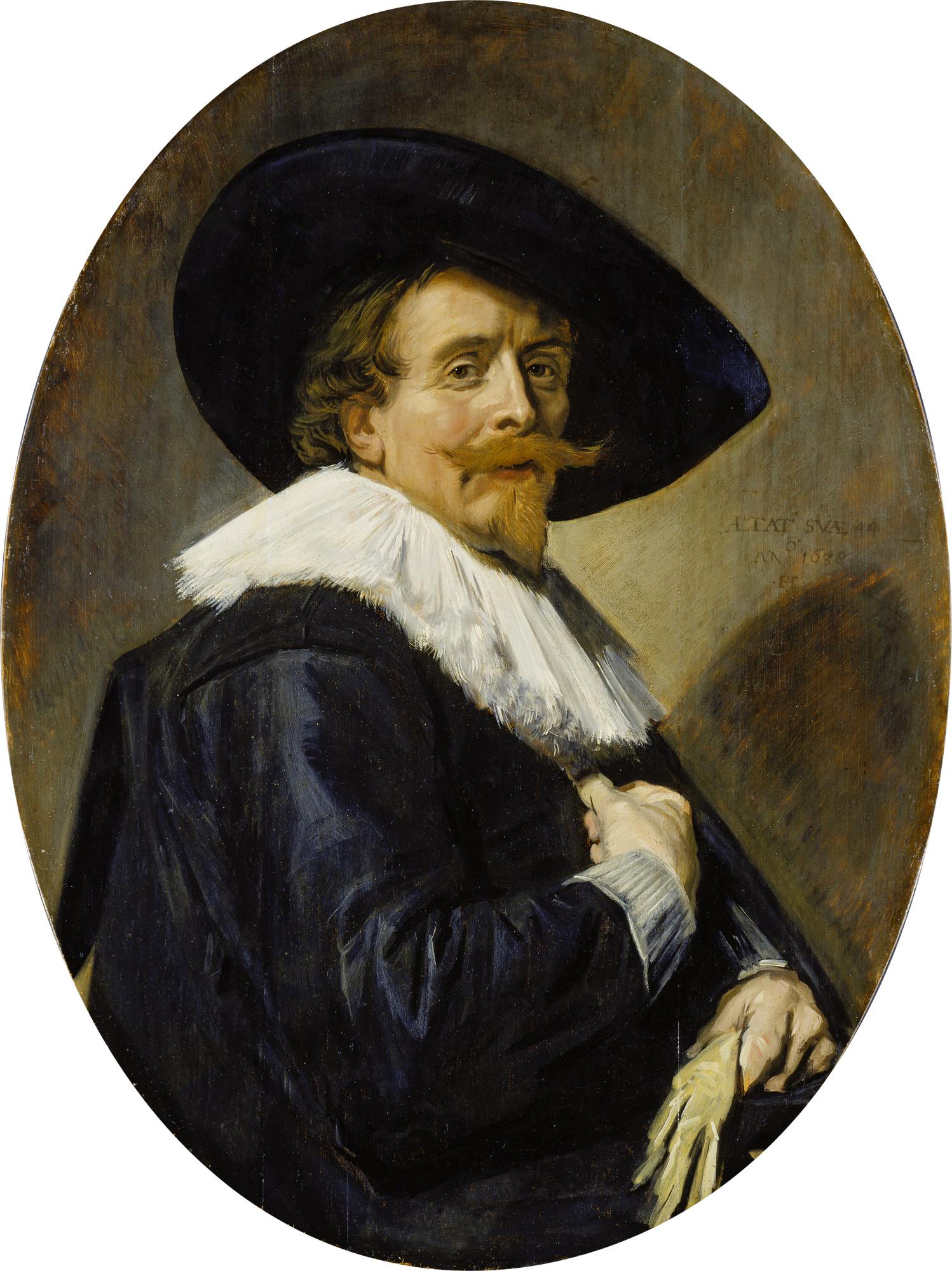
Portrait of a man

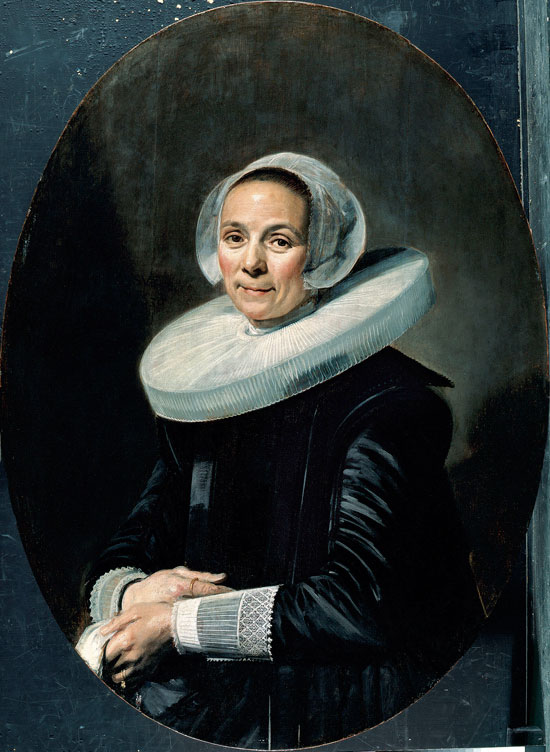
Portrait of a woman
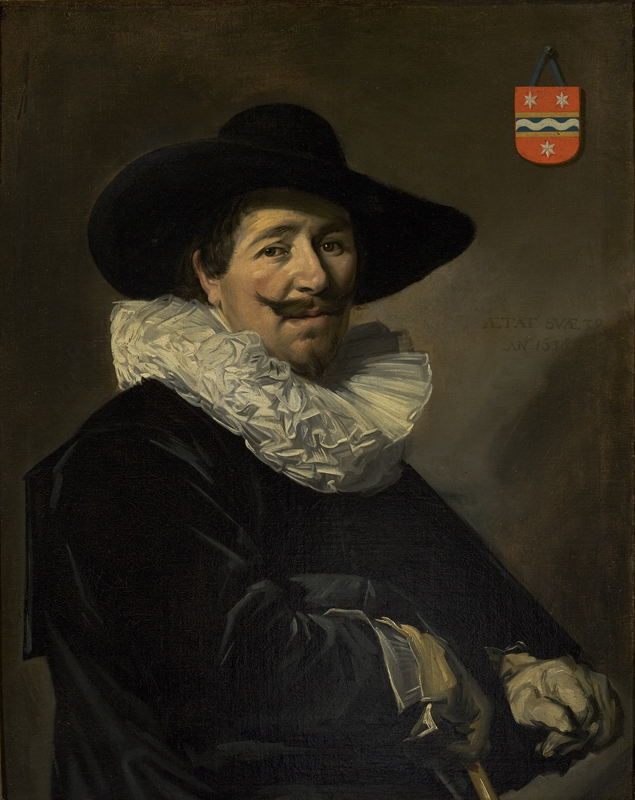
Andries van Hoorn

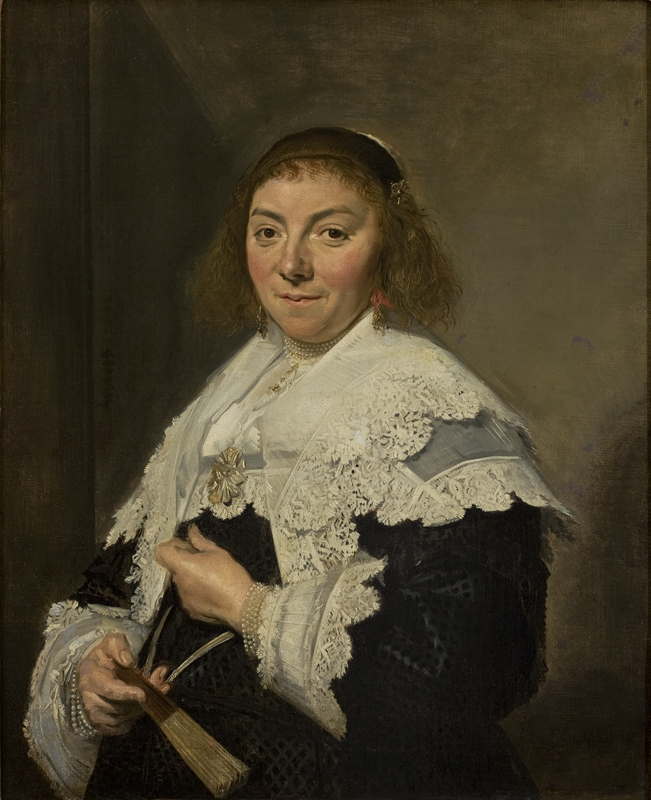
Maria Pietersdochter Olycan
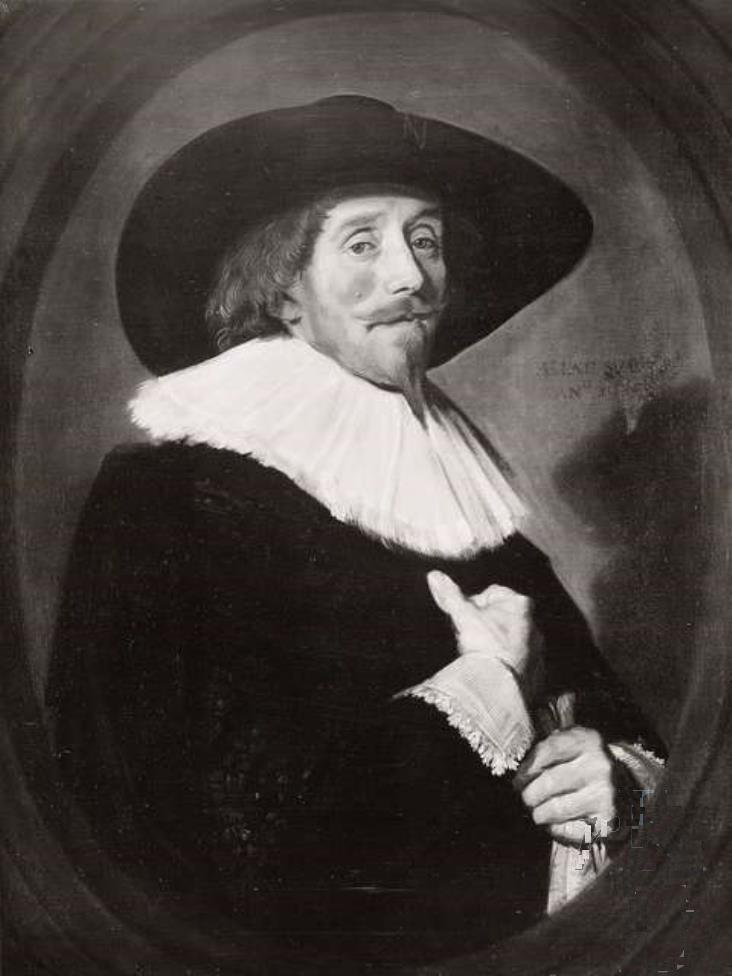
Portrait of a man

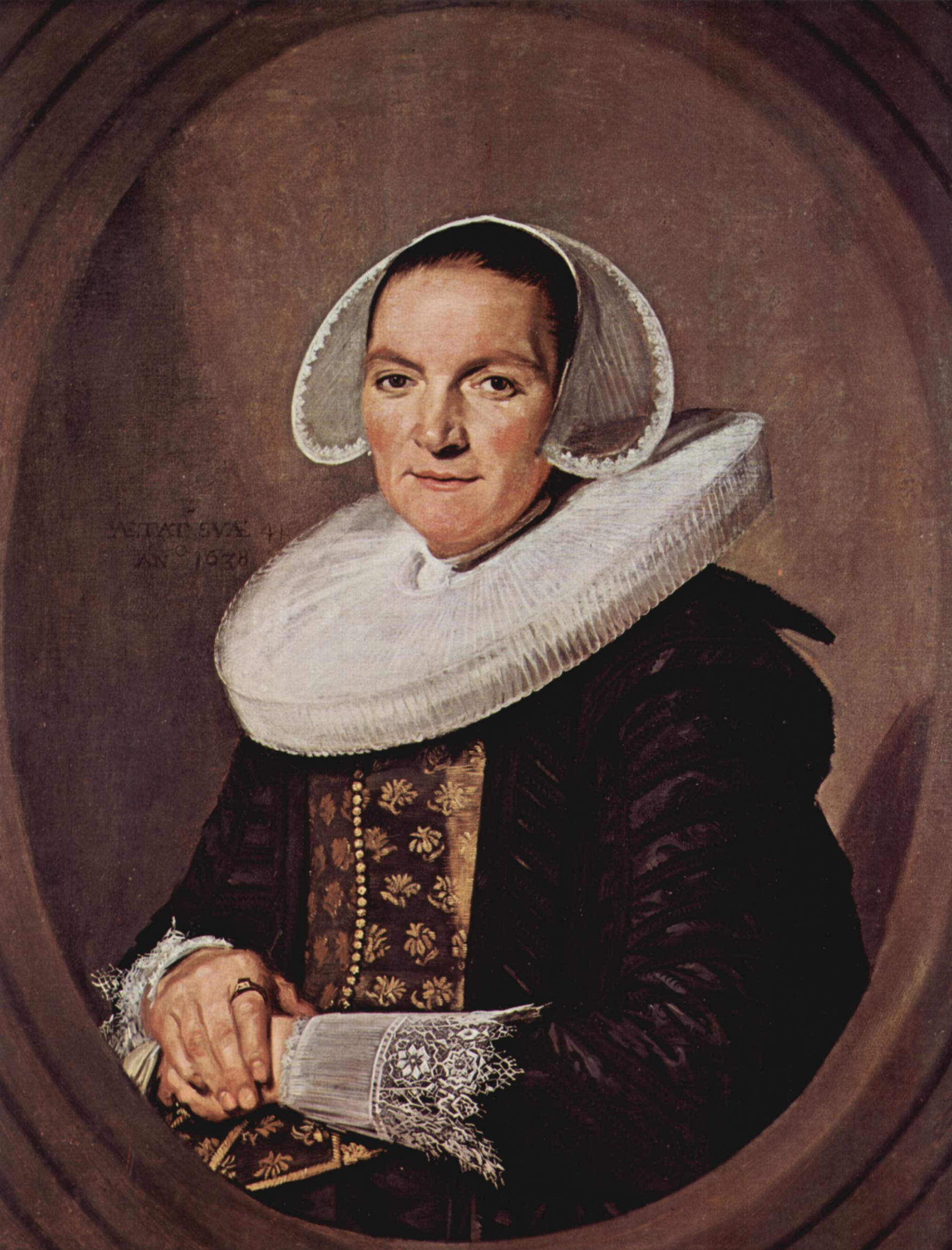
Portrait of a woman
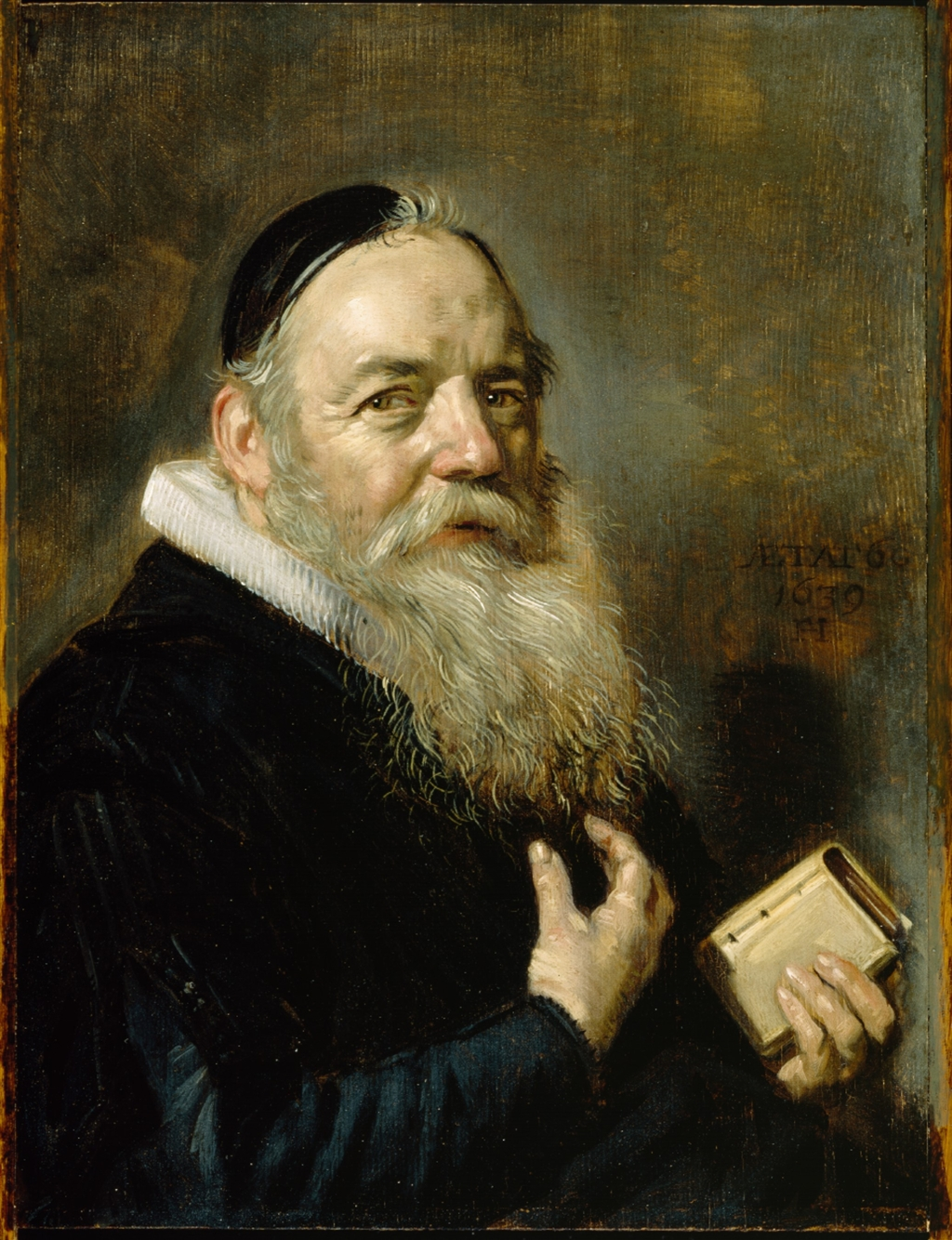
Hendrik Swalmius

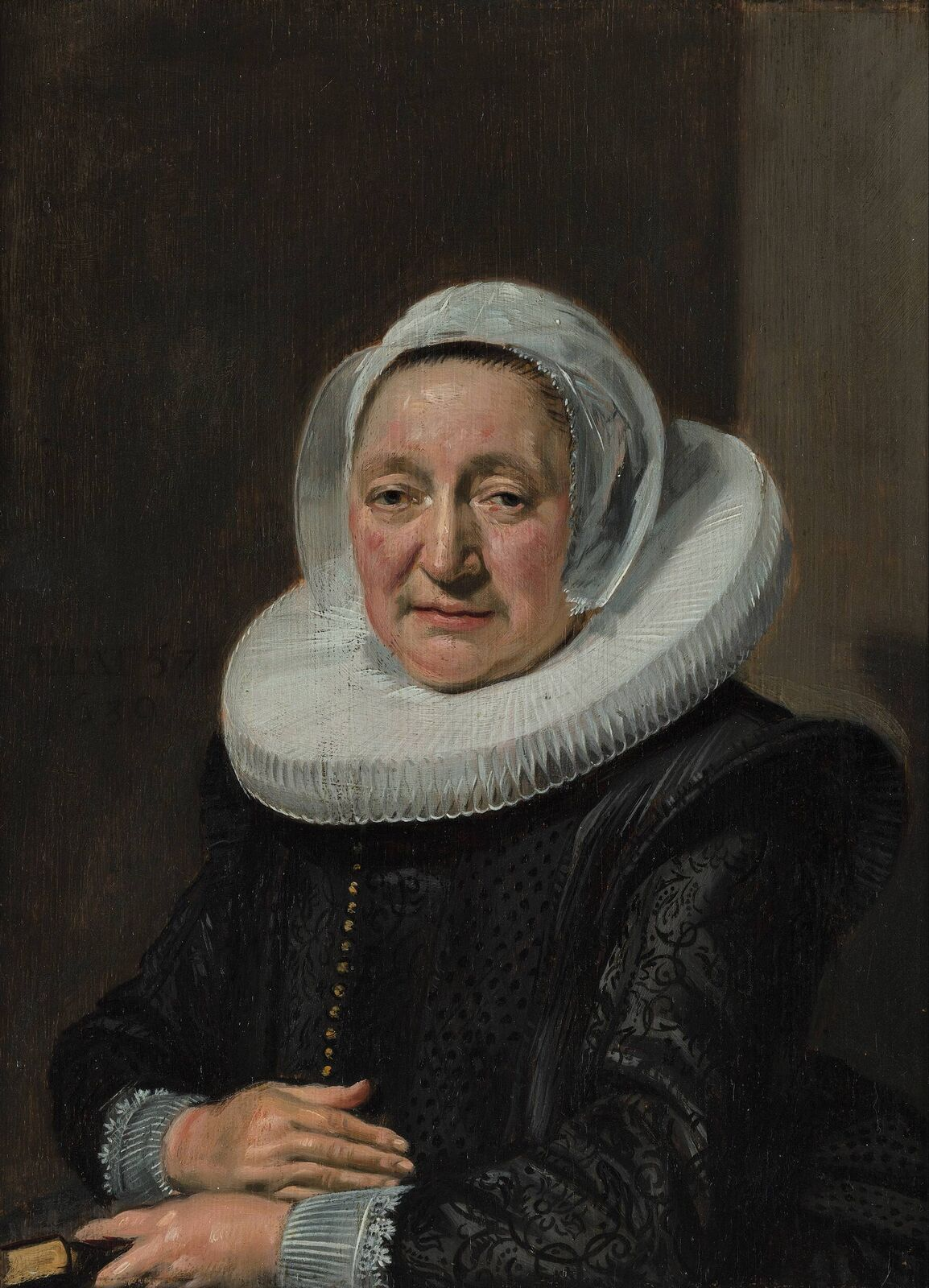
Judith van Breda
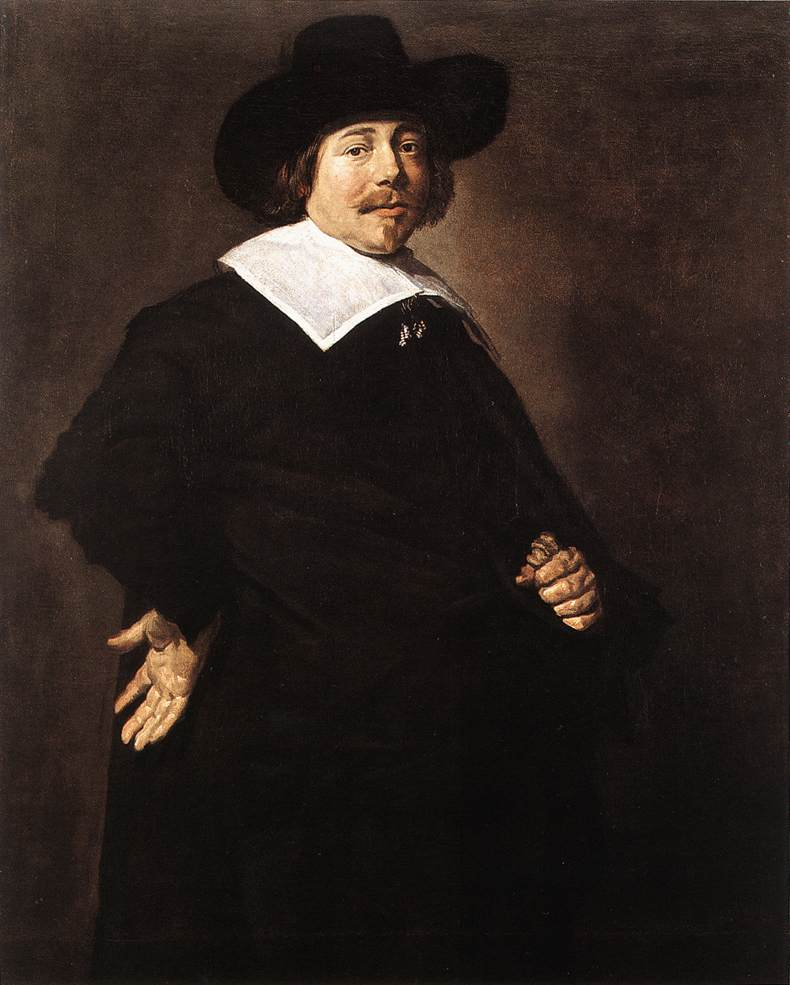
Albert van Nierop

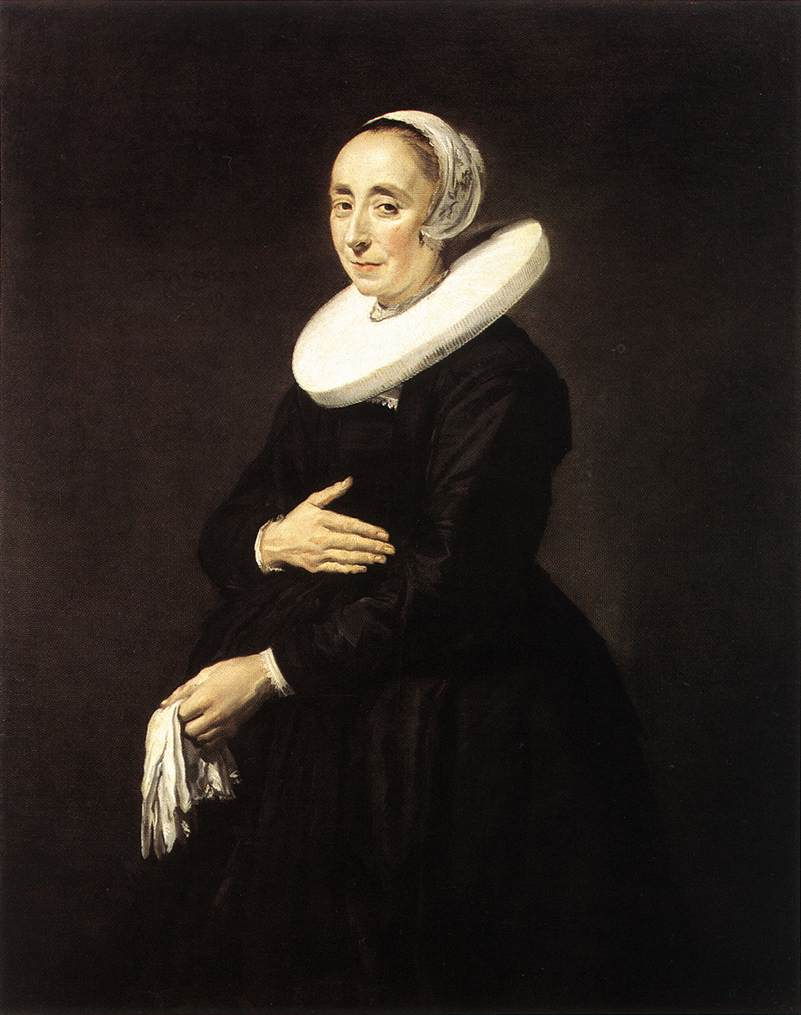
Cornelia van der Meer
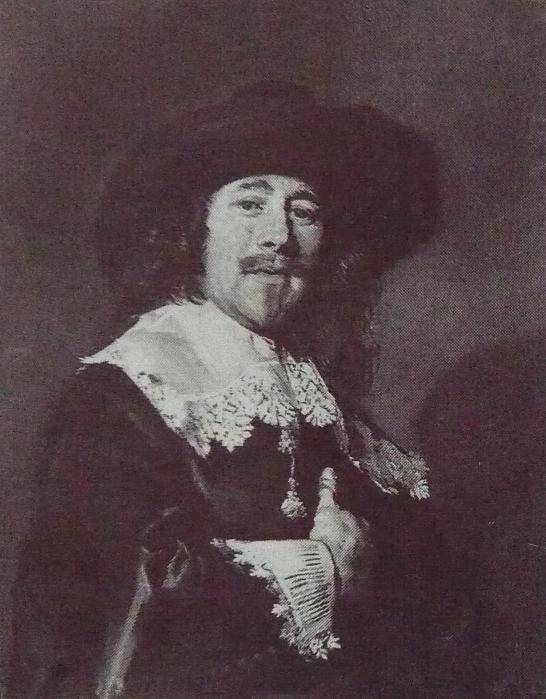
Portrait of a man

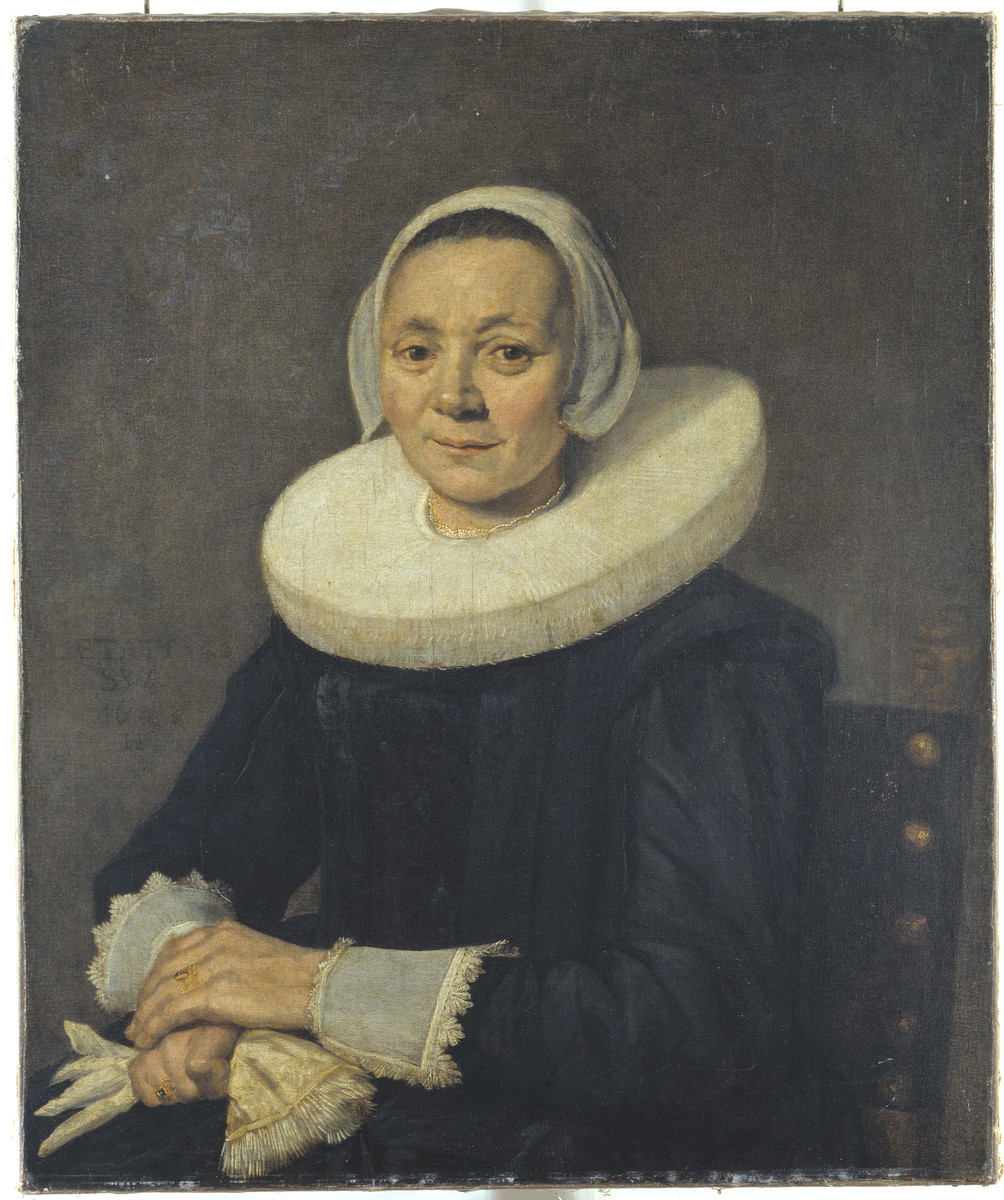
Portrait of a woman
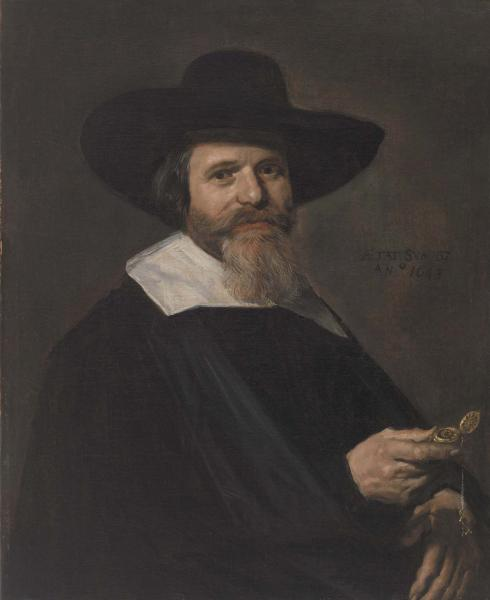
Portrait of a man

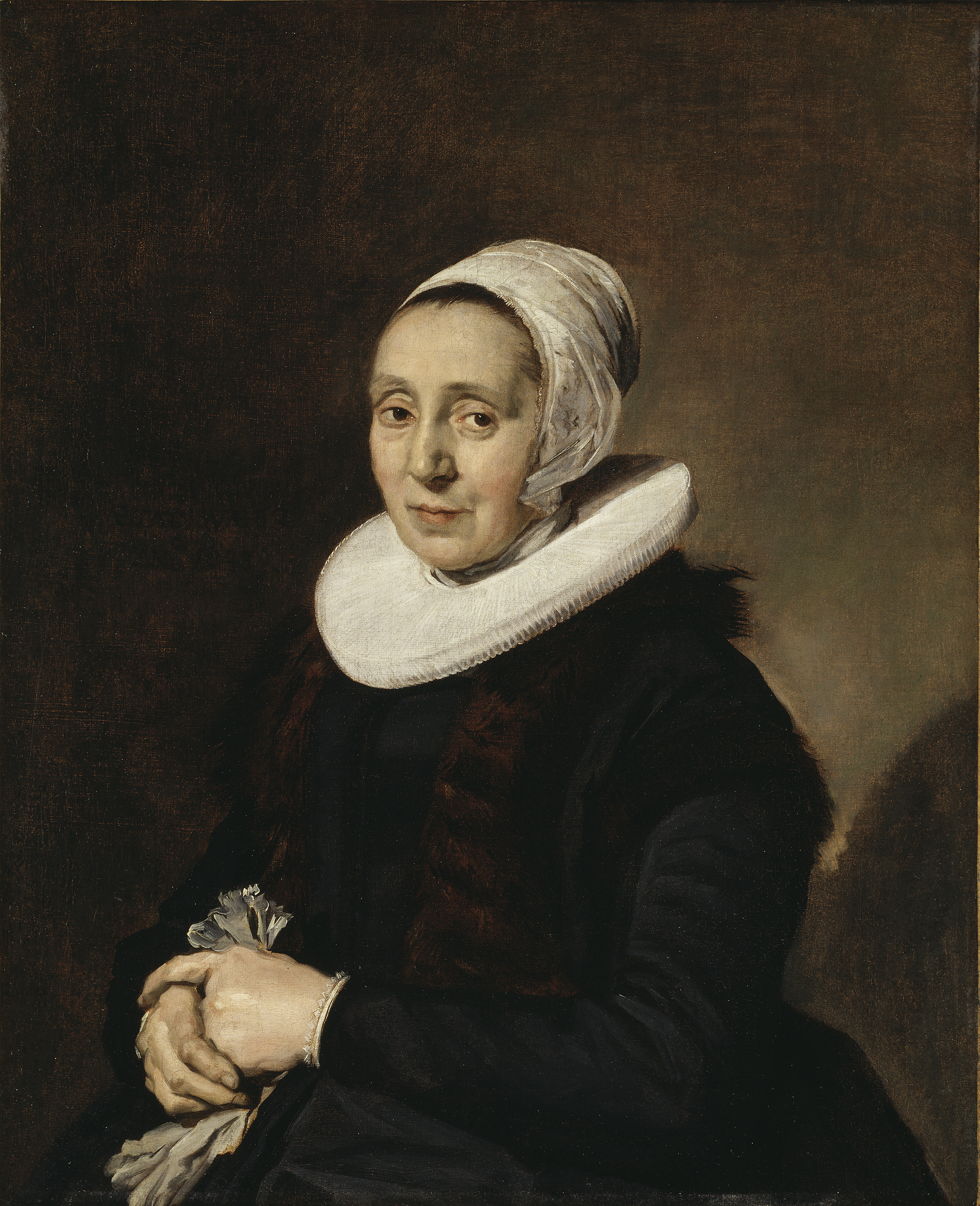
Portrait of a woman
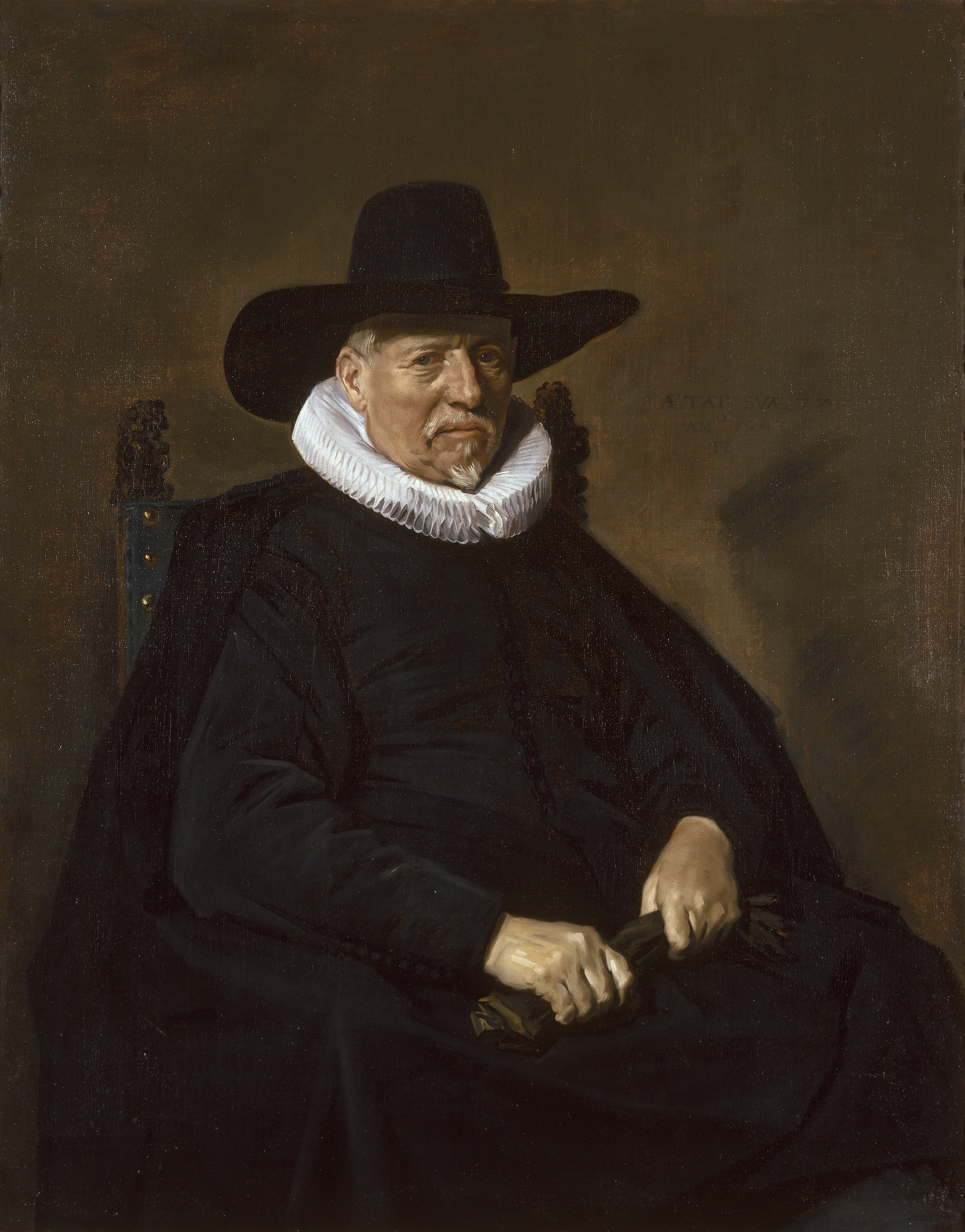
Portrait of Mr. Bodolphe

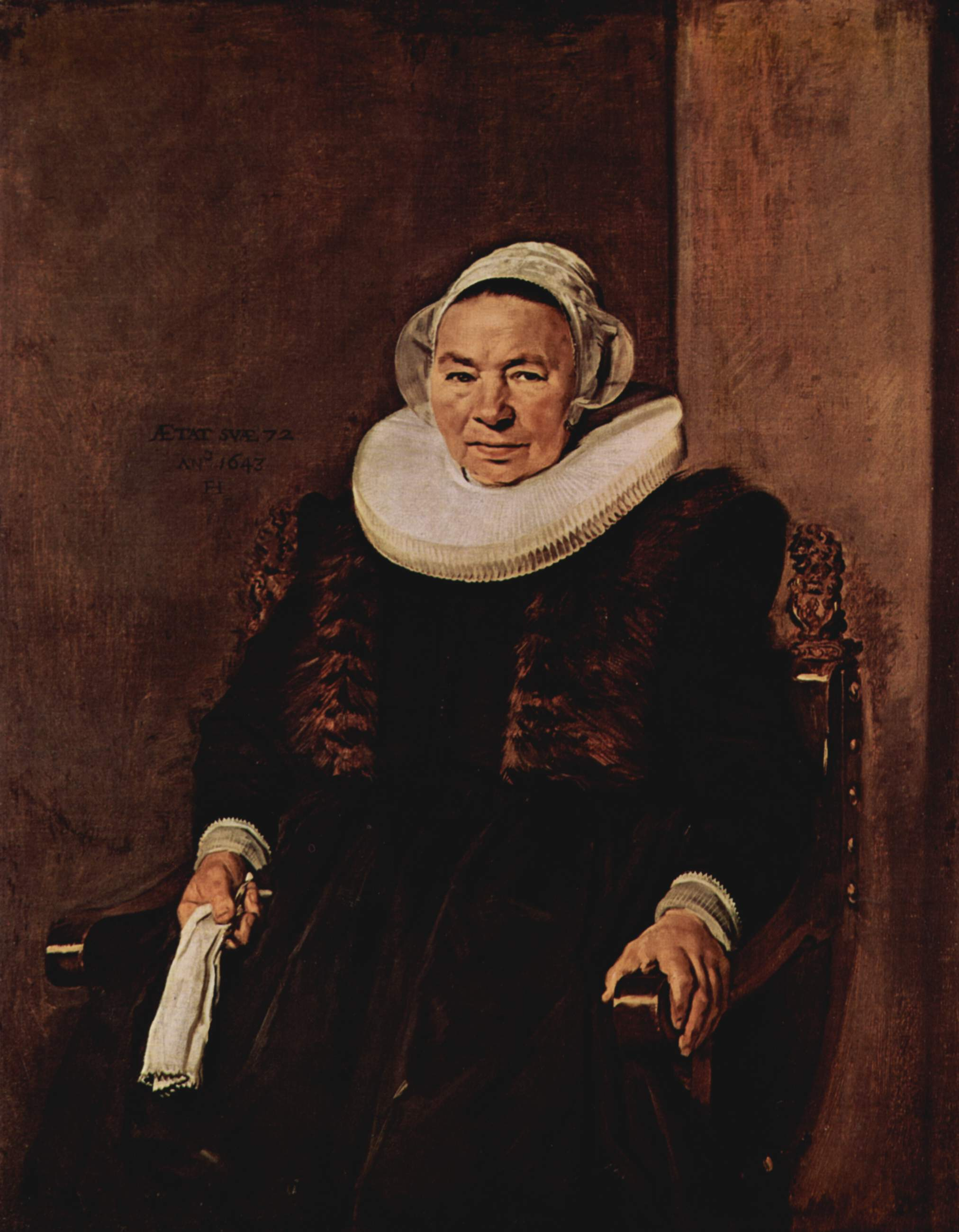
Portrait of Mrs. Bodolphe
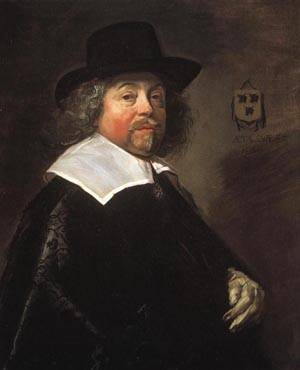
Joseph Coymans

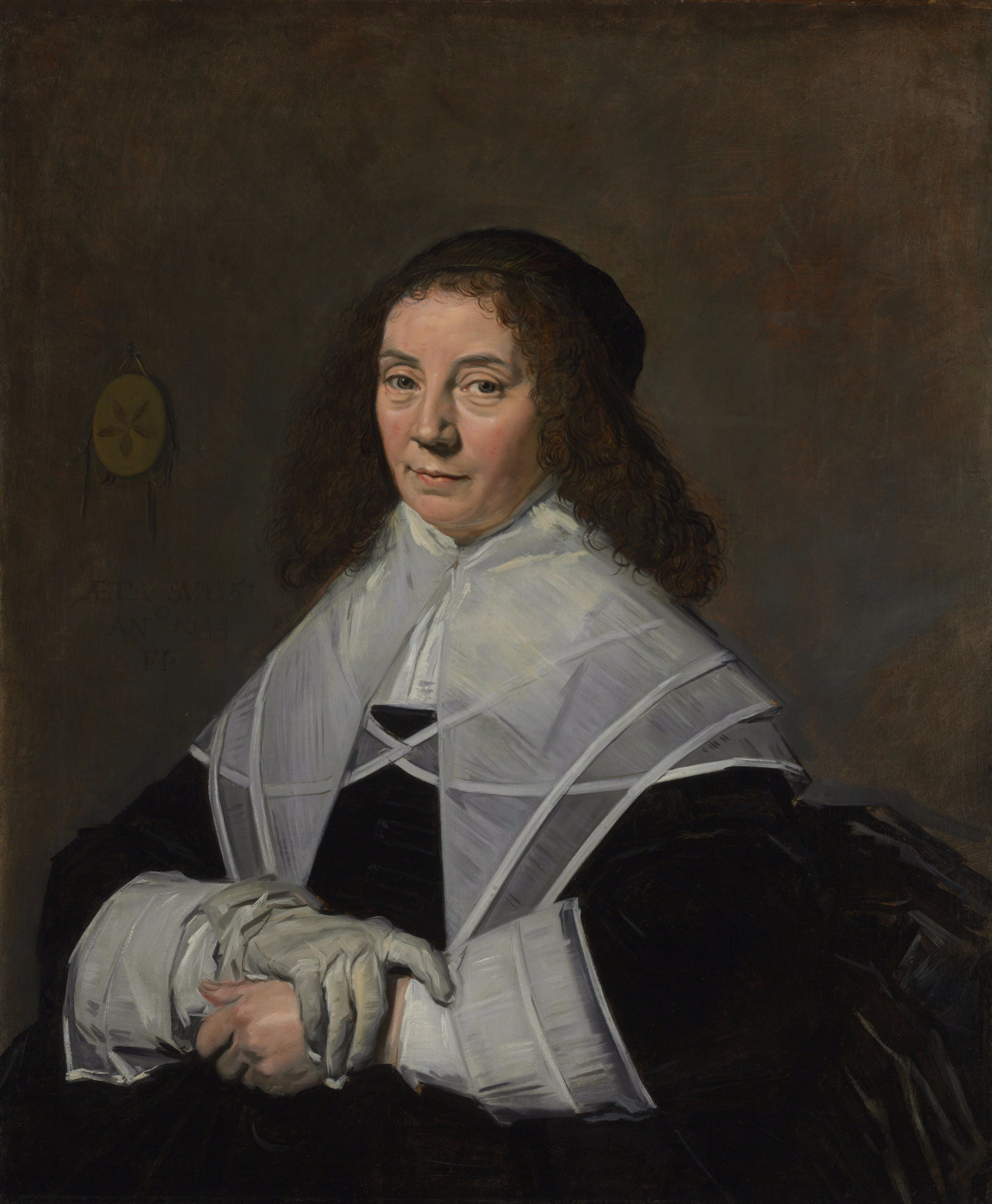
Dorothea Berck
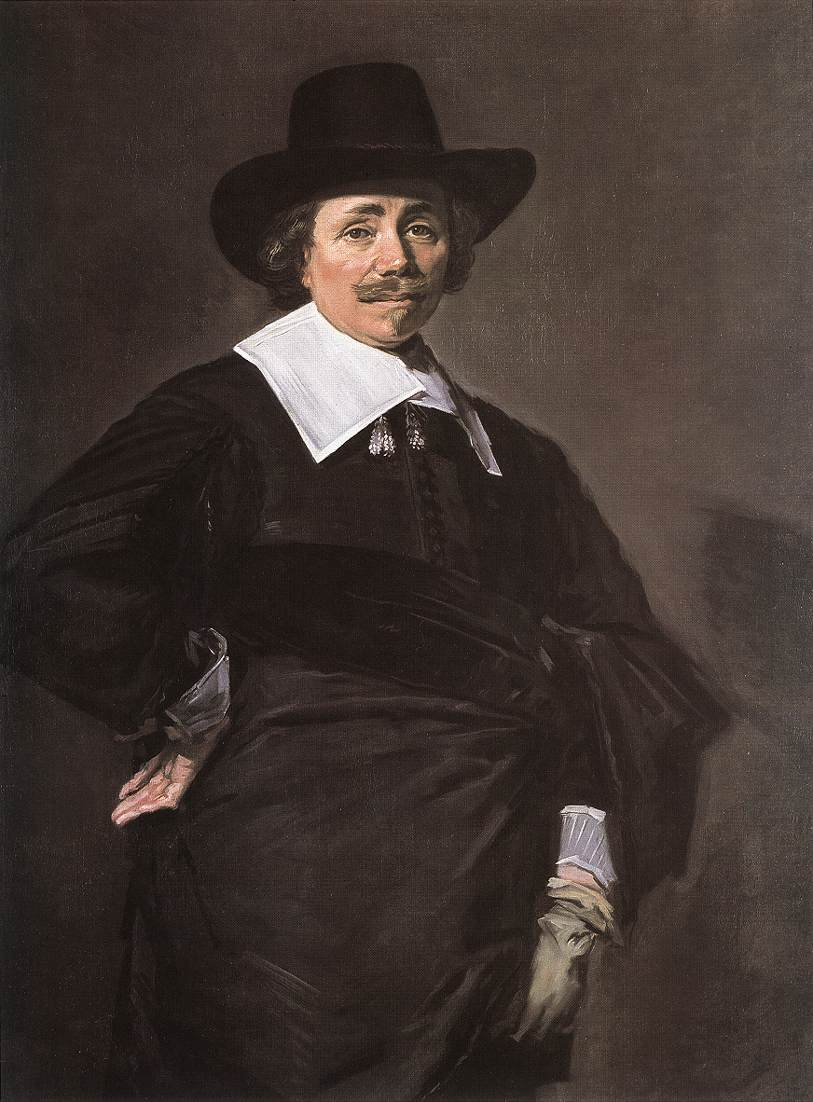
Portrait of a man

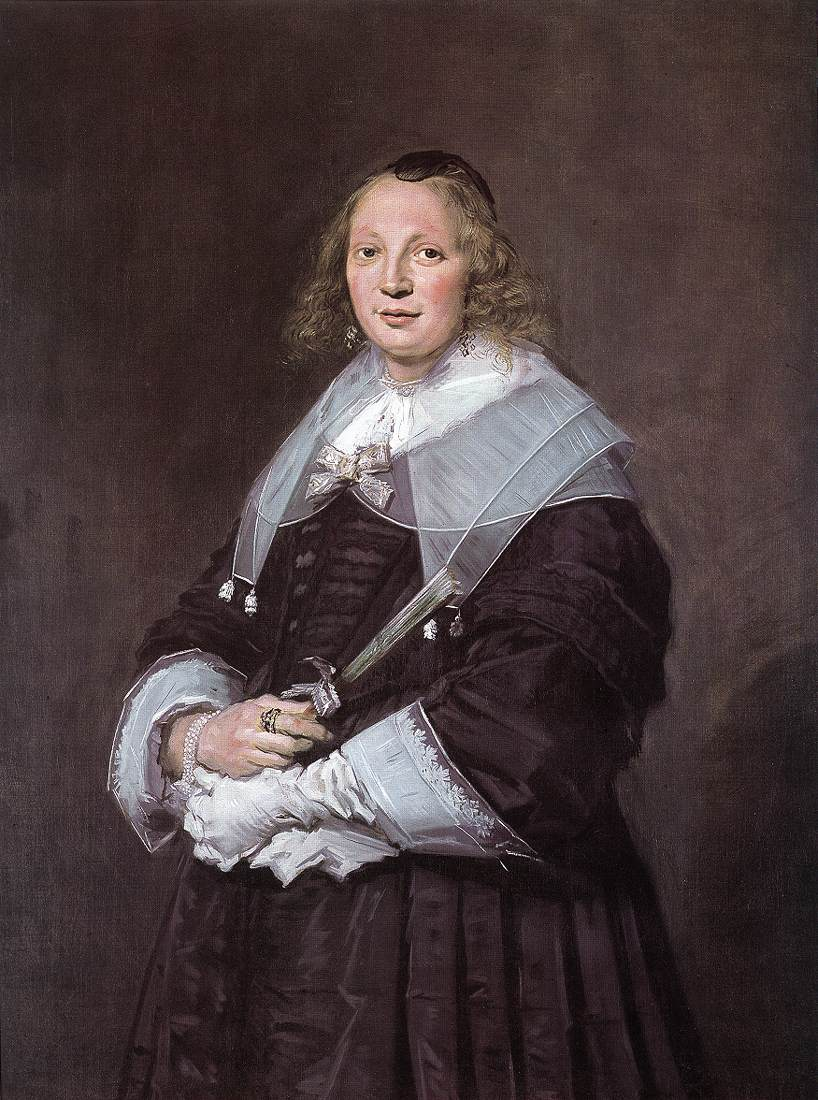
Portrait of a woman
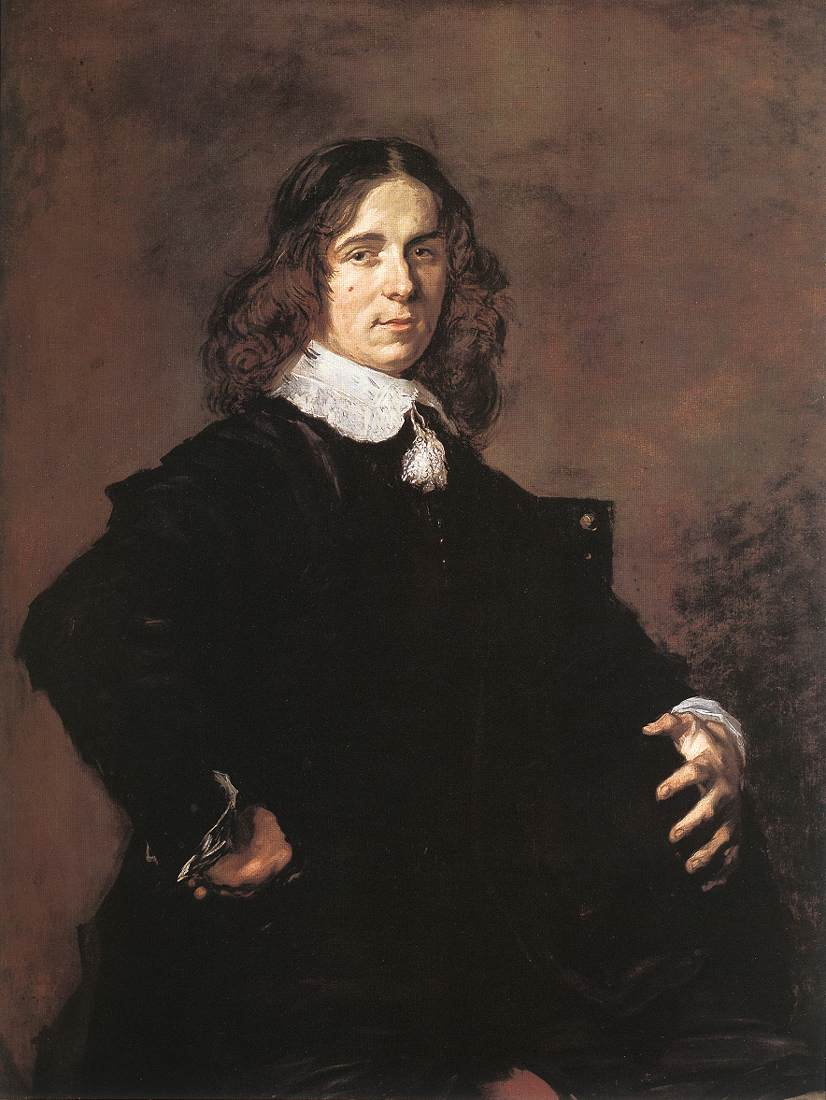
Portrait of a man

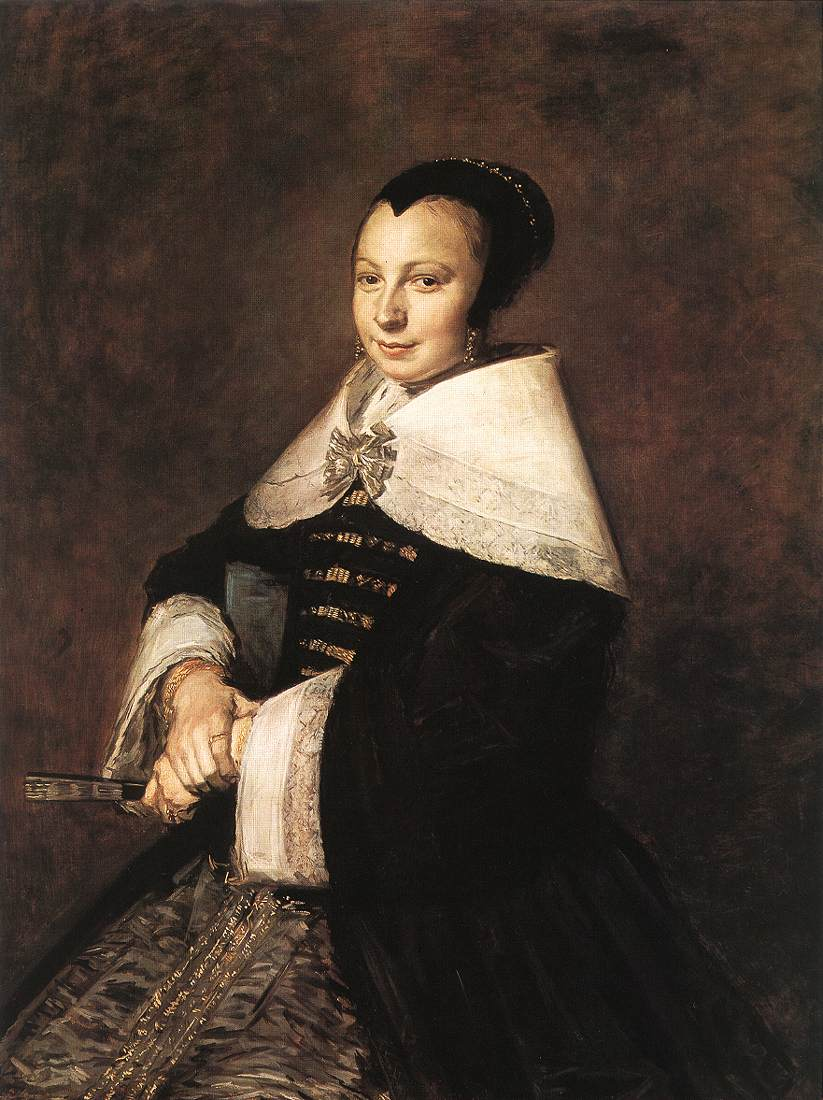
Portrait of a woman
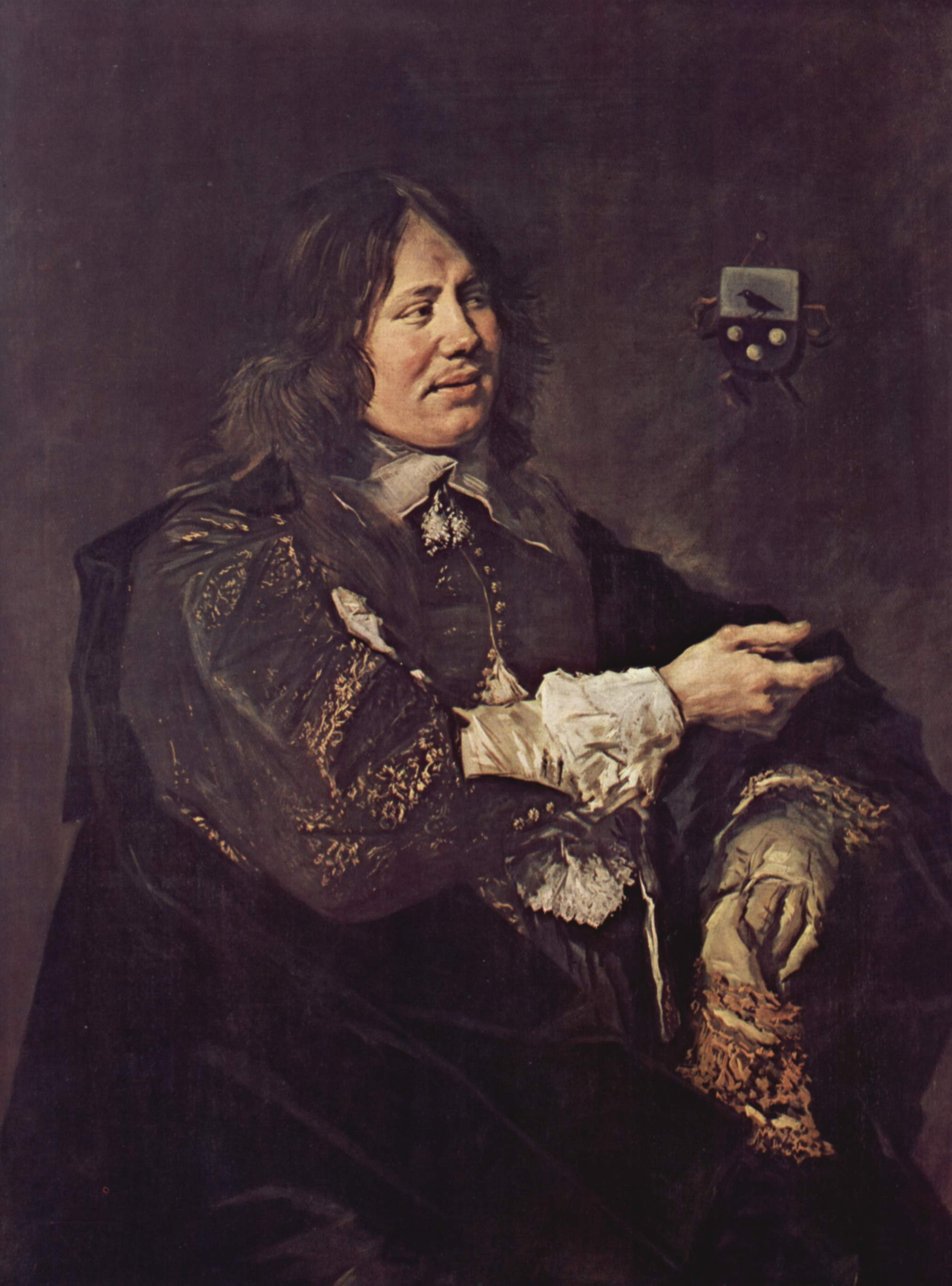
Stephanus Geeraerdts

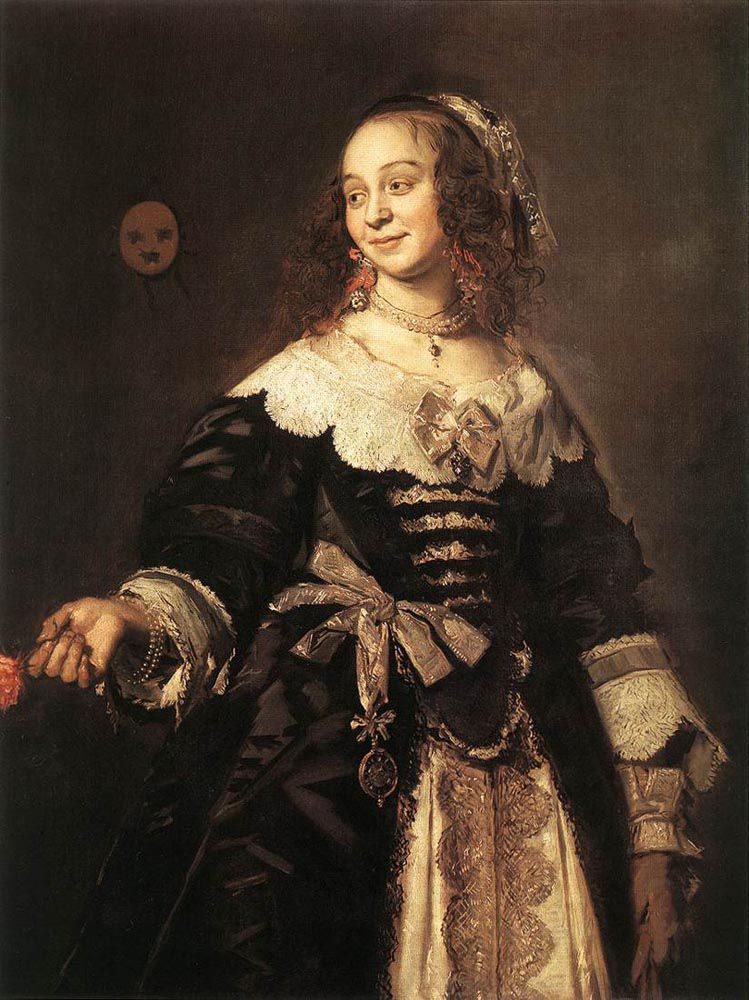
Isabella Coymans
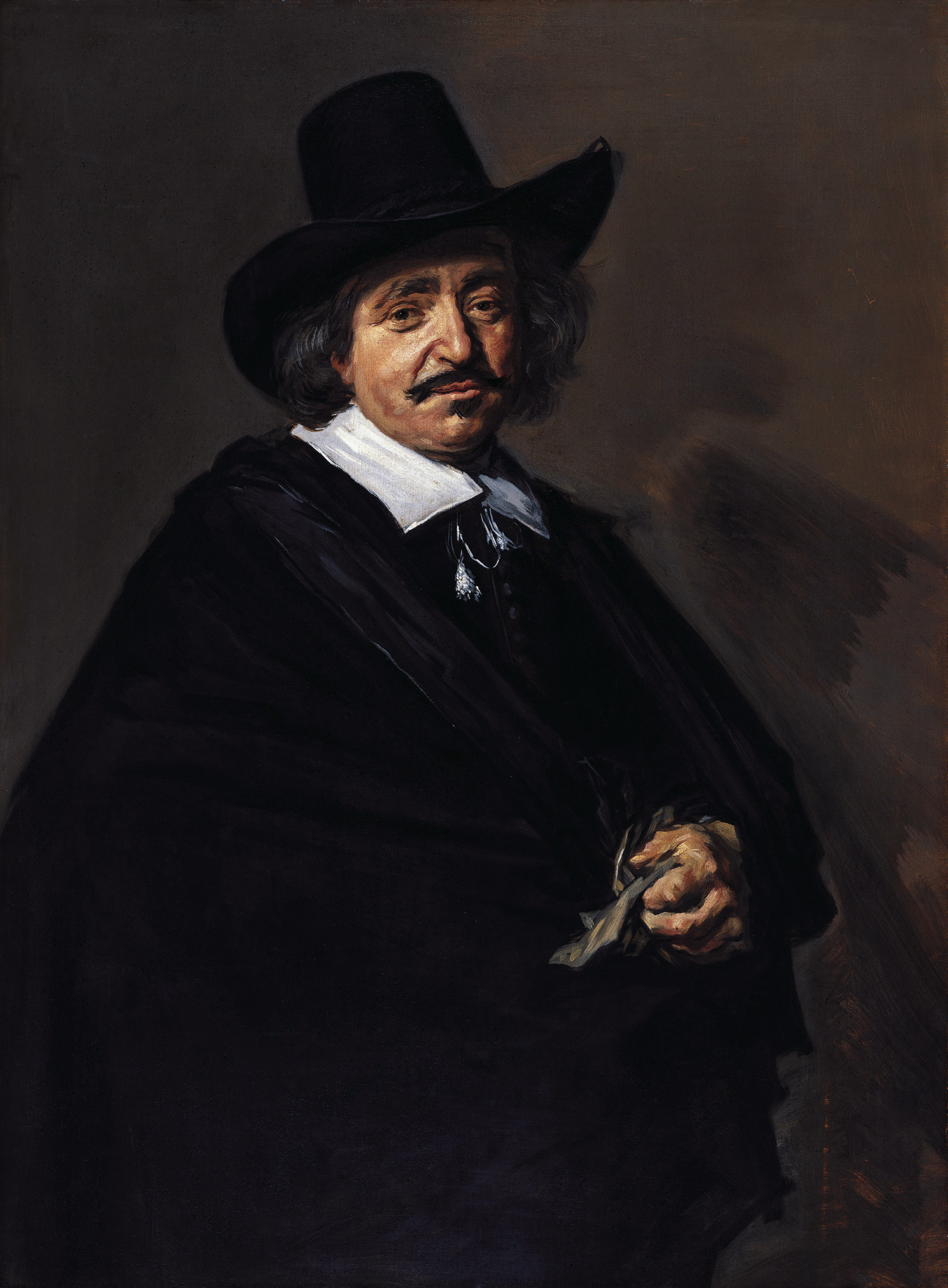
Portrait of a man

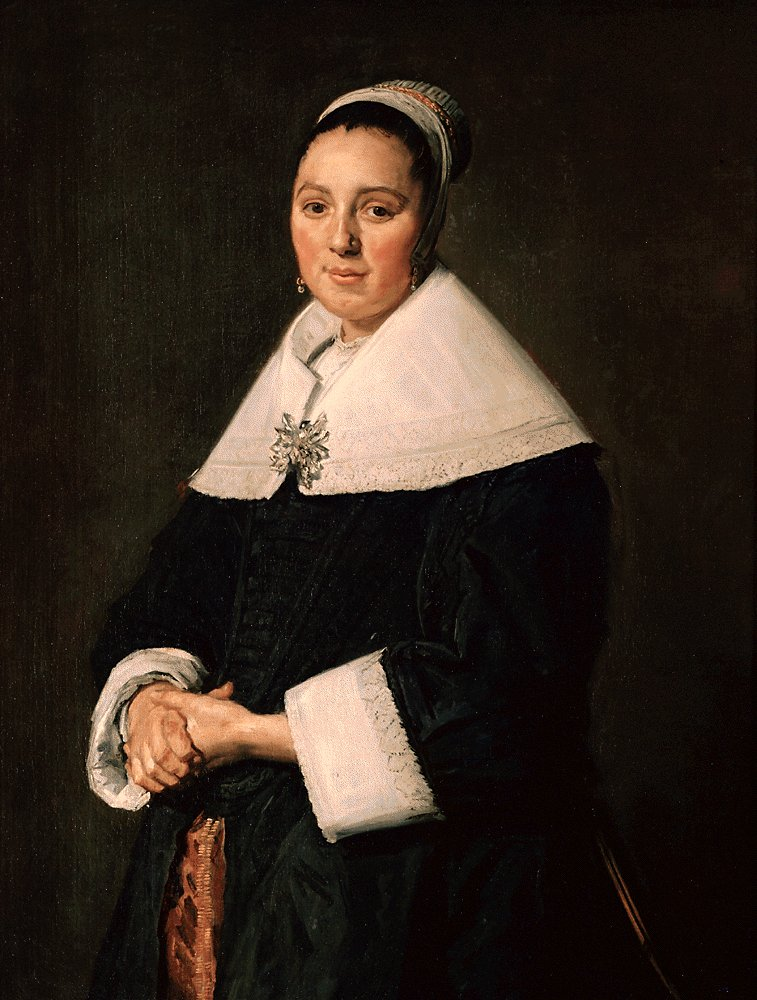
Portrait of a woman
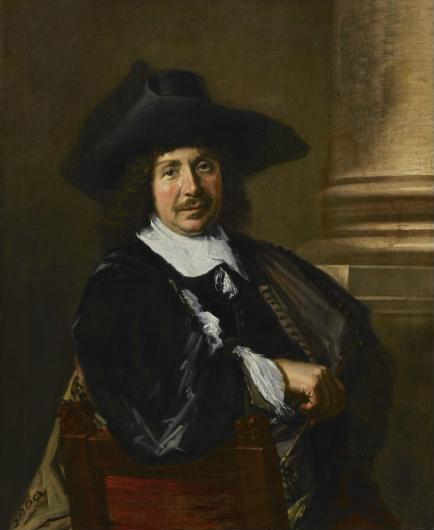
Portrait of a man

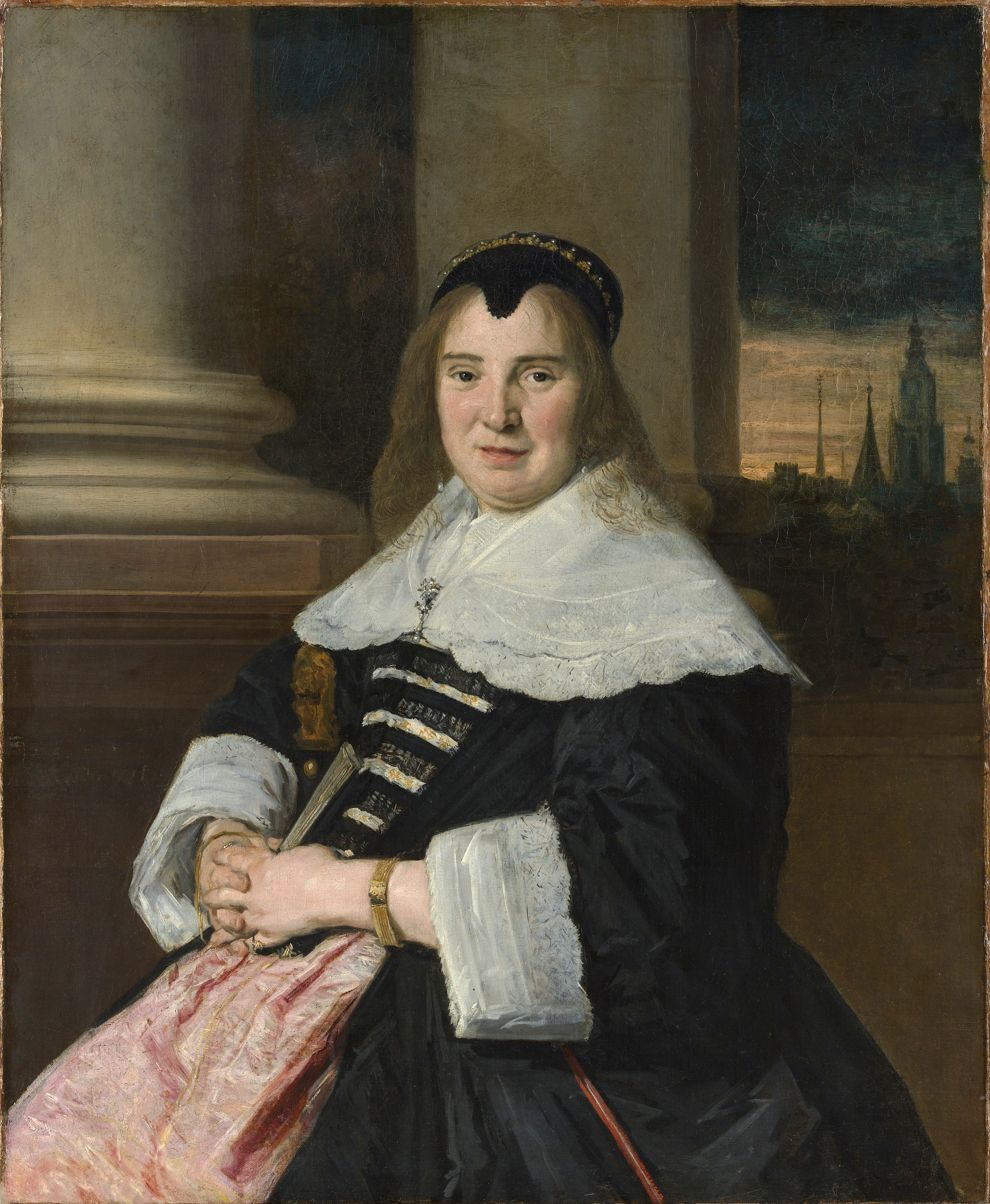
Portrait of a woman
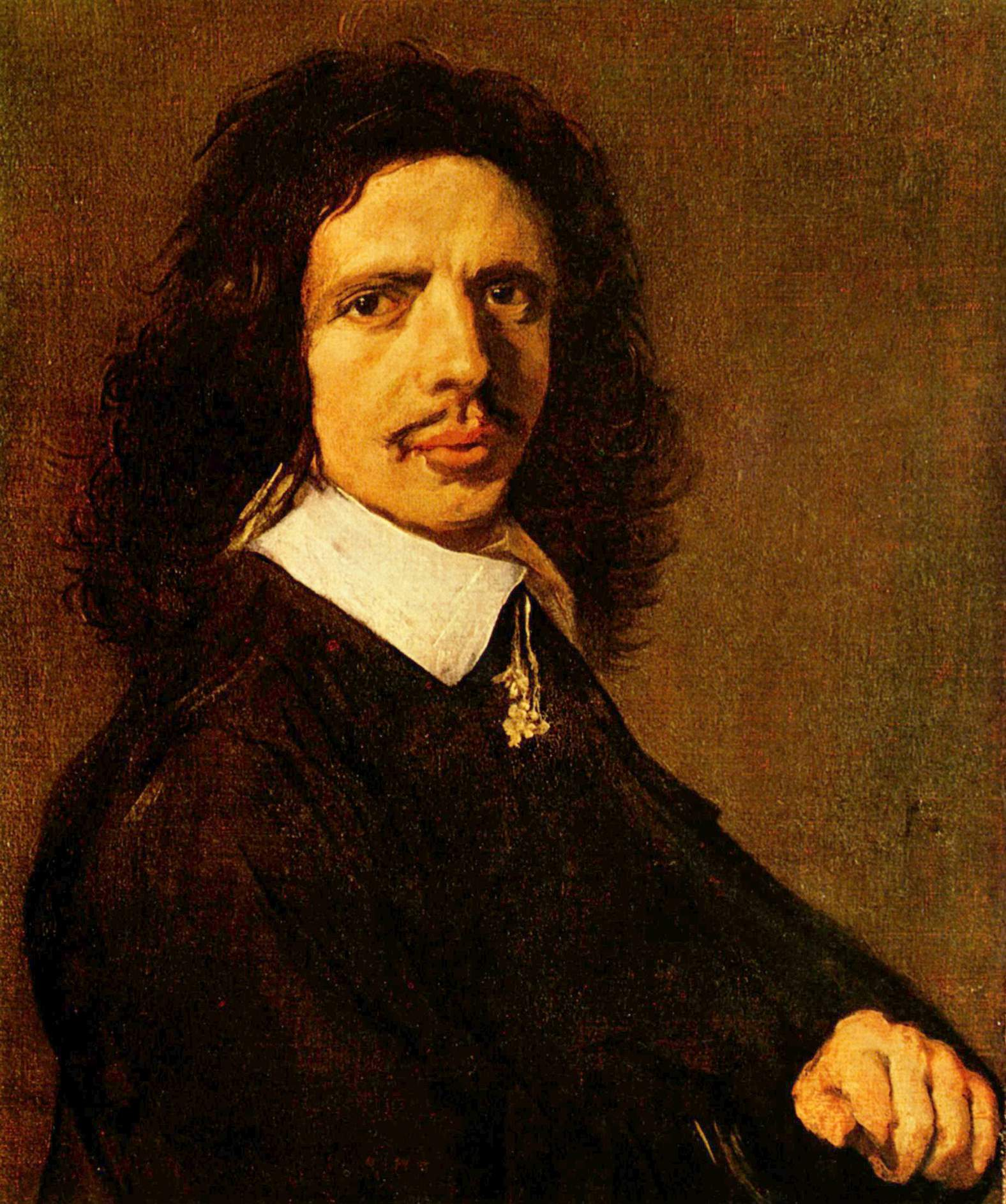
Portrait of a man

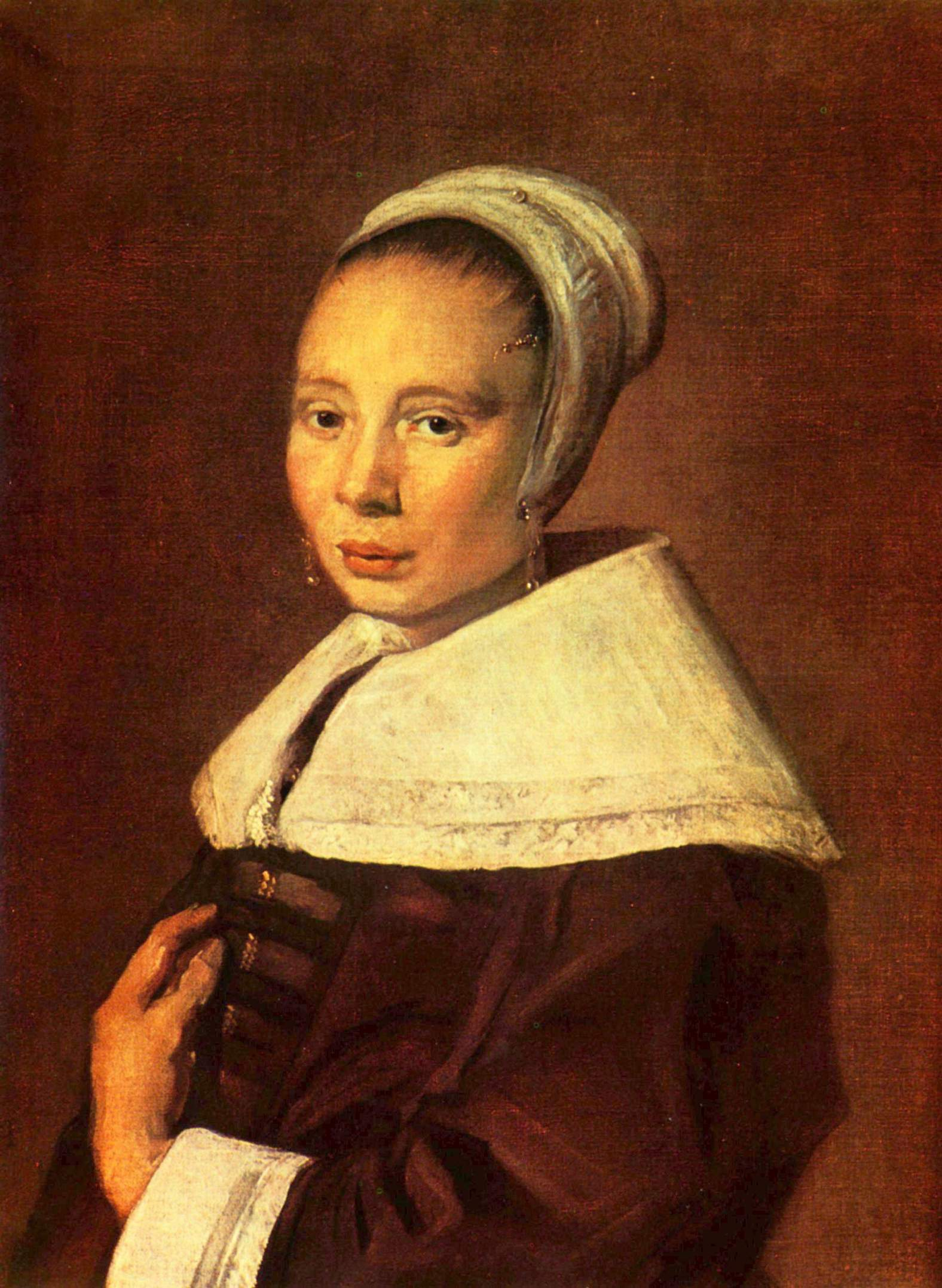
Portrait of a woman

== See also ==
- List of paintings by Frans Hals
