= Nicolaes Olycan =

Brewer of Haarlem

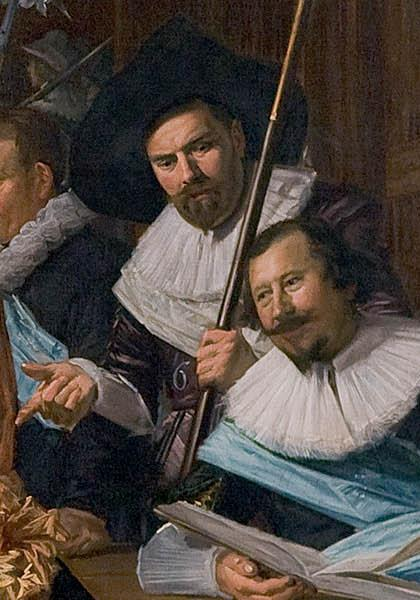
- Detail of 1633 schutterstuk by Frans Hals, with Nicolaes Olycan with pike and Hendrik Pot with book
- Born: 16 May 1599; Haarlem
- Died: 2 April 1639 (aged 39); Haarlem

Nicolaes Olycan (16 May 1599 – 2 April 1639) was a Netherlands brewer of Haarlem.

Olycan was born in Haarlem as the son of the brewers Pieter Jacobsz Olycan and Maritge Claesdr. Voogt. His brothers and sisters also became brewers. Besides running a brewery, he was a member of the Haarlem schutterij and served as sergeant during the years 1627–1630, and appears in the schutterstuk by Hendrik Pot of 1630. He was then promoted to lieutenant during the years 1630–1633, and appears in The Officers of the St Adrian Militia Company in 1633. He served again in (1636–1639), but died before the painting was finished that commemorated his service.

He married Agatha Dicx of brewery Scheepje on 27 April 1631. In 1639 Nicolaes died and Agatha remarried, on 7 April 1645, to Mattheus Hoffland. After he died she carried on as boss of the brewery until her death in 1667.
