= Vlieger =

Vlieger can refer to:

- Vlieger (cape), an article of clothing
- Vlieger, North West, a South African village
