= Nicolaes van Loo =

Dutch brewer

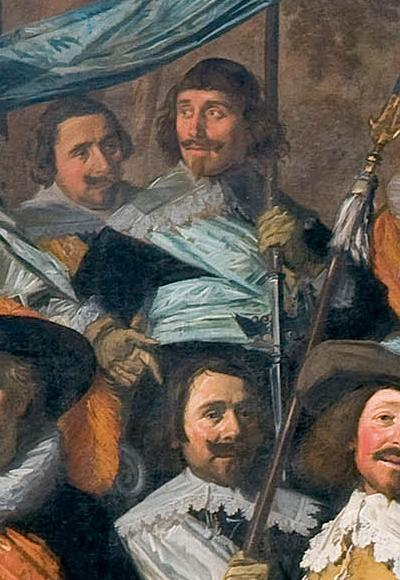
Portrait of Nicolaes van Loo standing in front of Hendrik Gerritsz Pot, detail of Frans Hals' schutterstuk The Officers of the St George Militia Company in 1639

Nicolaes van Loo (1607 – 1641), was a Dutch Golden Age brewer from Haarlem, best known today for his portrait by Frans Hals.

== Biography ==
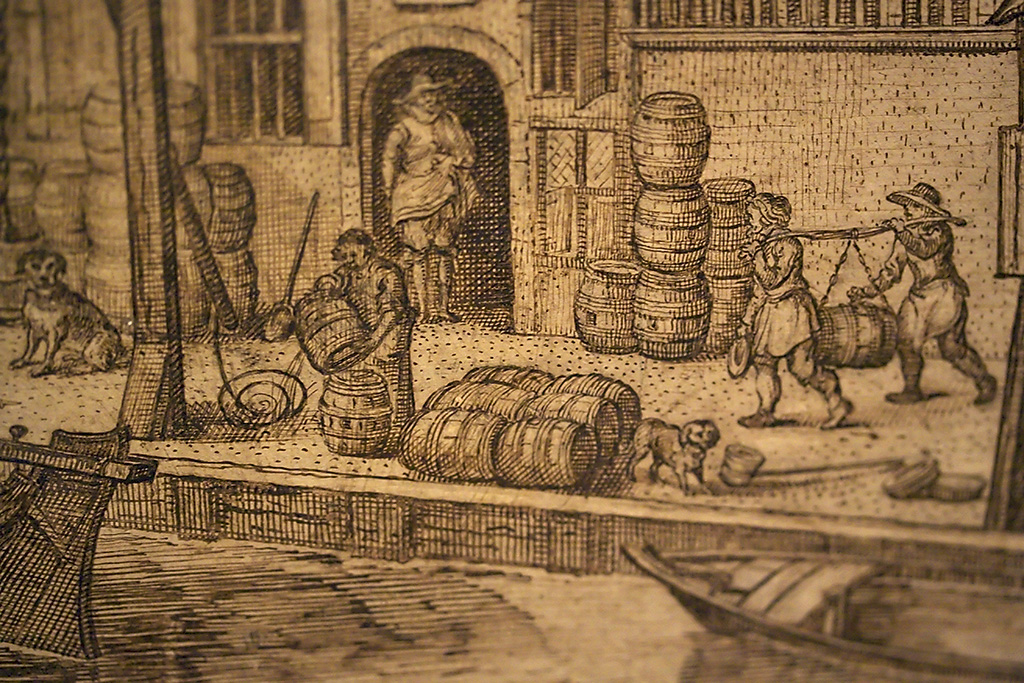
Detail of a grisaille painting of the family brewery called De Drie Lelien, by Jacob Matham in 1627. It could be either Nicolaes or his father standing in the doorway.

He was born in Haarlem as the oldest son of the brewer Johan Claesz Loo and Margriet Akersloot. Their family brewery was situated in the Vissersbocht on the Spaarne river and was called De Drie Lelien. Nicolaes' brother Cornelis became mayor of Haarlem and his sister Risje married the son of the mayor of Delft, Florens Pieter van der Houff. Nicolaes was destined to inherit the family business, and in expectation of a merger with another local brewery, in 1640 he married Aletta Hannemans, the rich widow of the brewer Jacob Pietersz Olycan, but he died the following year, leaving his widow to carry on the business without him.
