= Johan Claesz Loo =

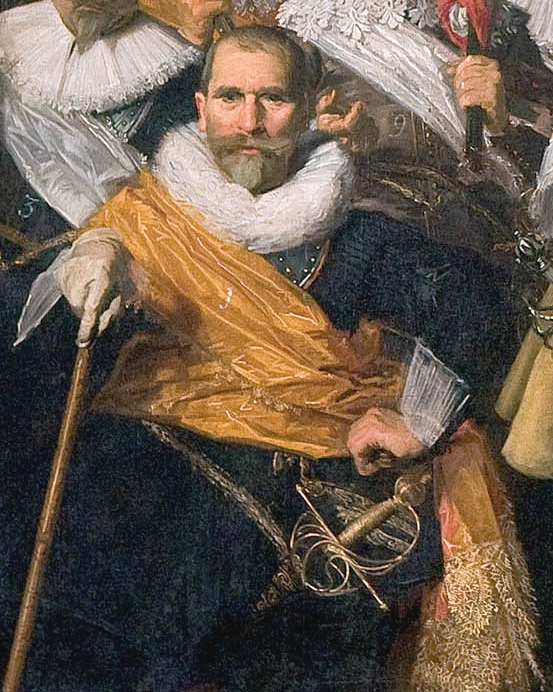
Portrait of Johan Claesz Loo, detail of Frans Hals' schutterstuk The Officers of the St Adrian Militia Company in 1633

Johan Claesz van Loo (c.1585 – 1660) was a Dutch brewer, owning De Drie Leliën (The Three Lilies) in Haarlem, best known today for his portrait painted by Frans Hals.

== Biography ==
He was painted twice by Hals in his capacity as member of the Haarlem schutterij, the first time as captain in the St. Adrian group in 1633, and the second time in 1639 as colonel of the St. Joris group. According to Pieter Biesboer, he married Margrietge Arisdr Akersloot (the sister of Outgert Ariss Akersloot), and they had several children who later also became brewers. Their daughter Risje (1604-1652) married Florens Pietersz van der Hoeff in 1624. His son-in-law Hoeff served with him in the civic guard and was also painted by Hals in a stance in which he is looking at his father-in-law. Their son Cornelis van Loo (1609-1673) married Dorothea Olycan in 1635. Their son Nicolaas married Aletta Hannemans, the widow of Dorothea's brother Jacob Pietersz Olycan, in 1641. Loo was a member of the Haarlem regency from 1618 until his death, and he was a representative to the Staten-Generaal during the years 1649–1652.

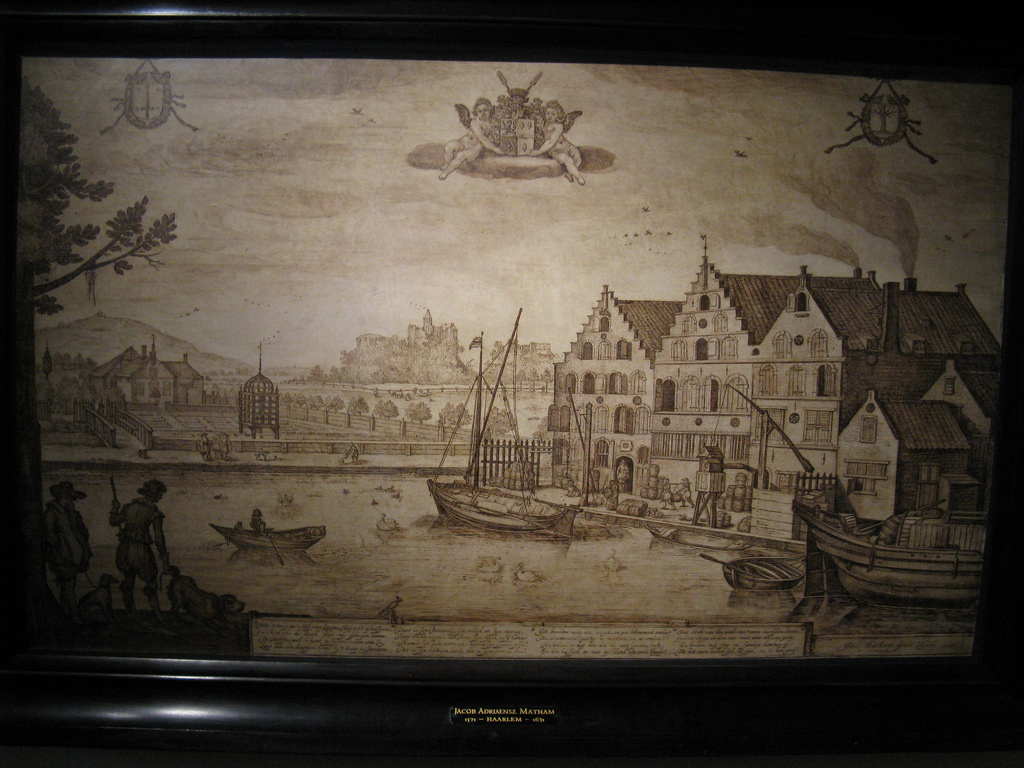
Johan Claesz Loo's summer home on the left, called Velserend, and his brewery on the right called De Drie Leliën in 1627.

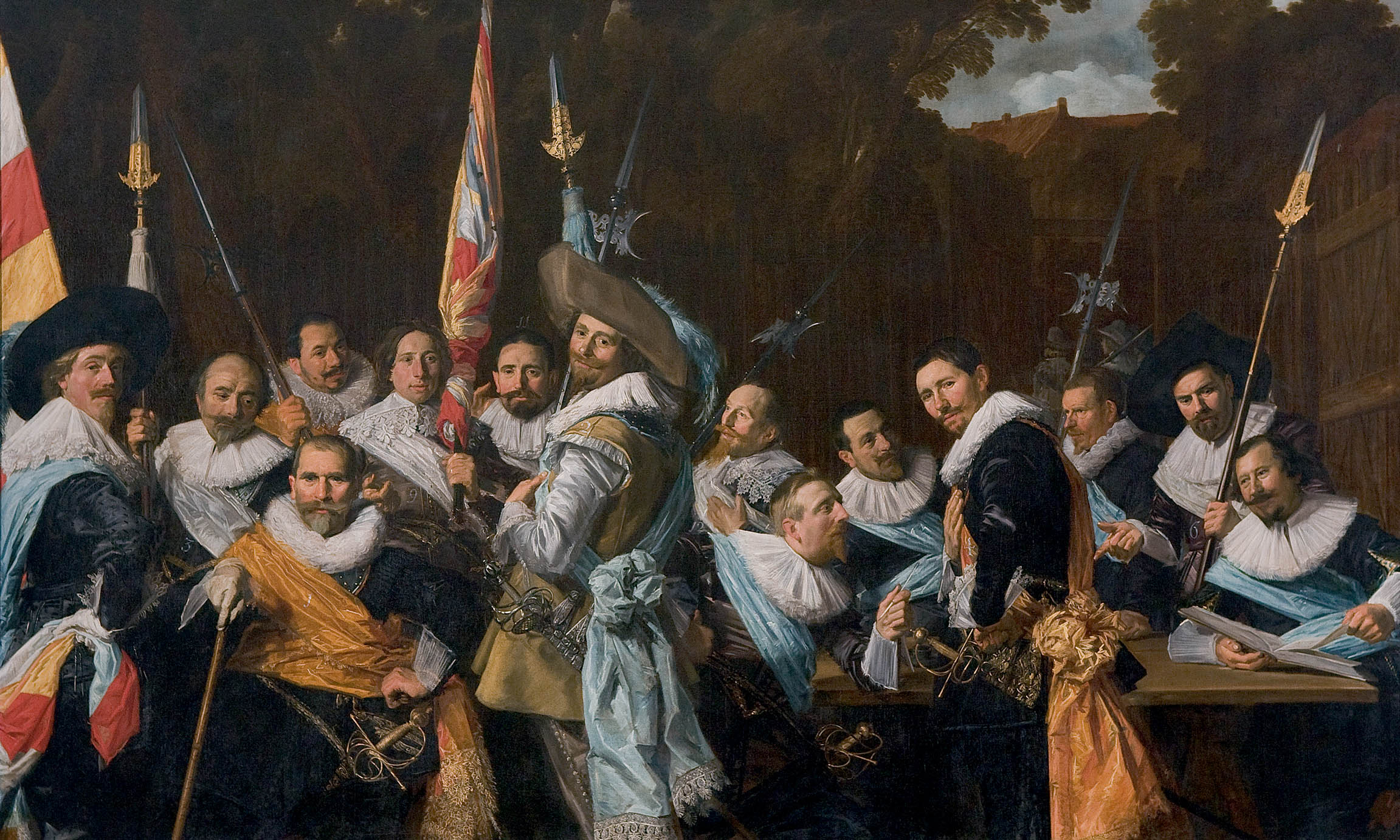
The Officers of the St Adrian Militia Company in 1633

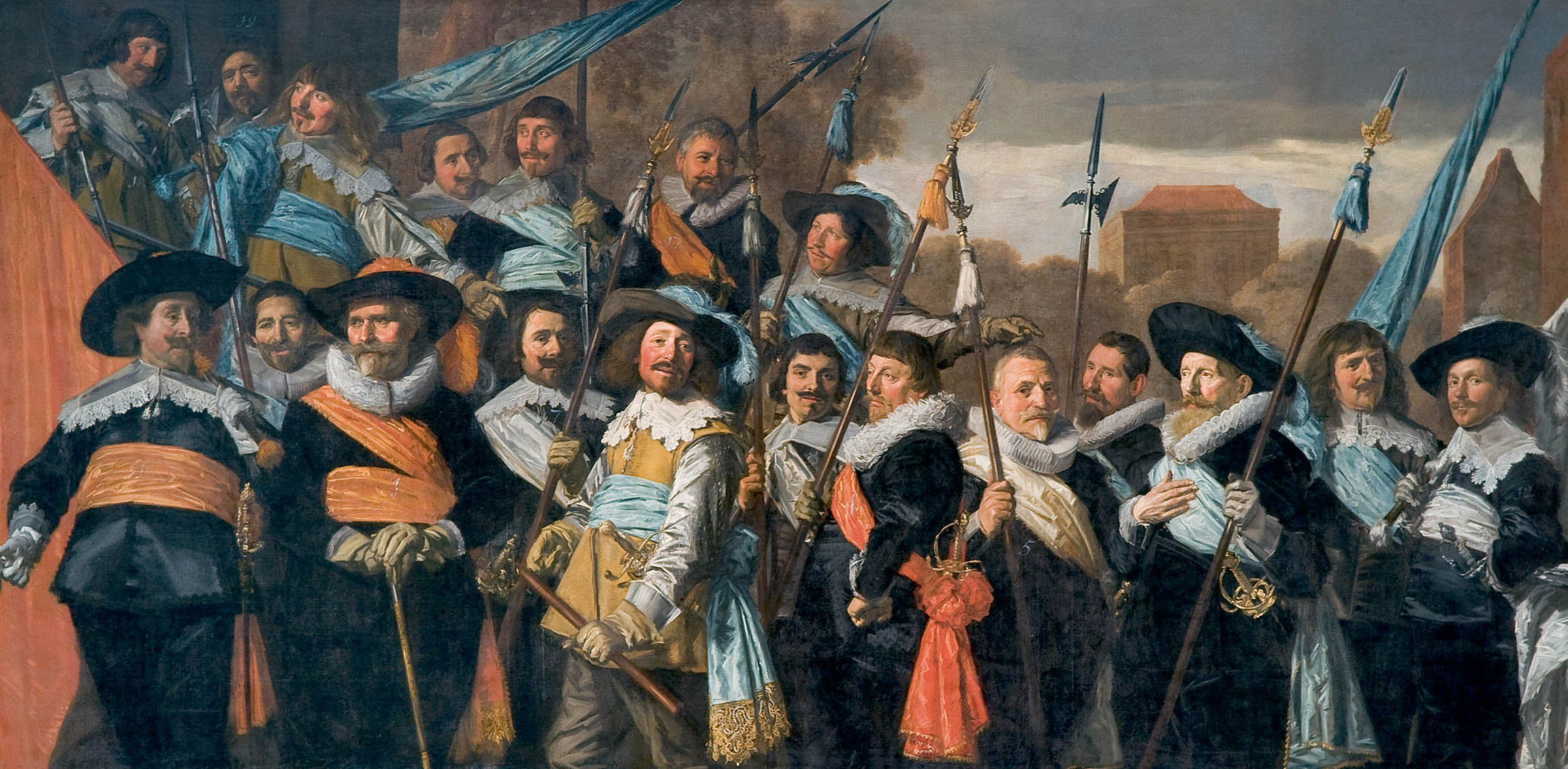
The Officers of the St George Militia Company in 1639

His portrait in the 1633 schutterstuk formed the inspiration for a self-portrait by William Merritt Chase in 1903.
