= Isabella van Leeuwarden =

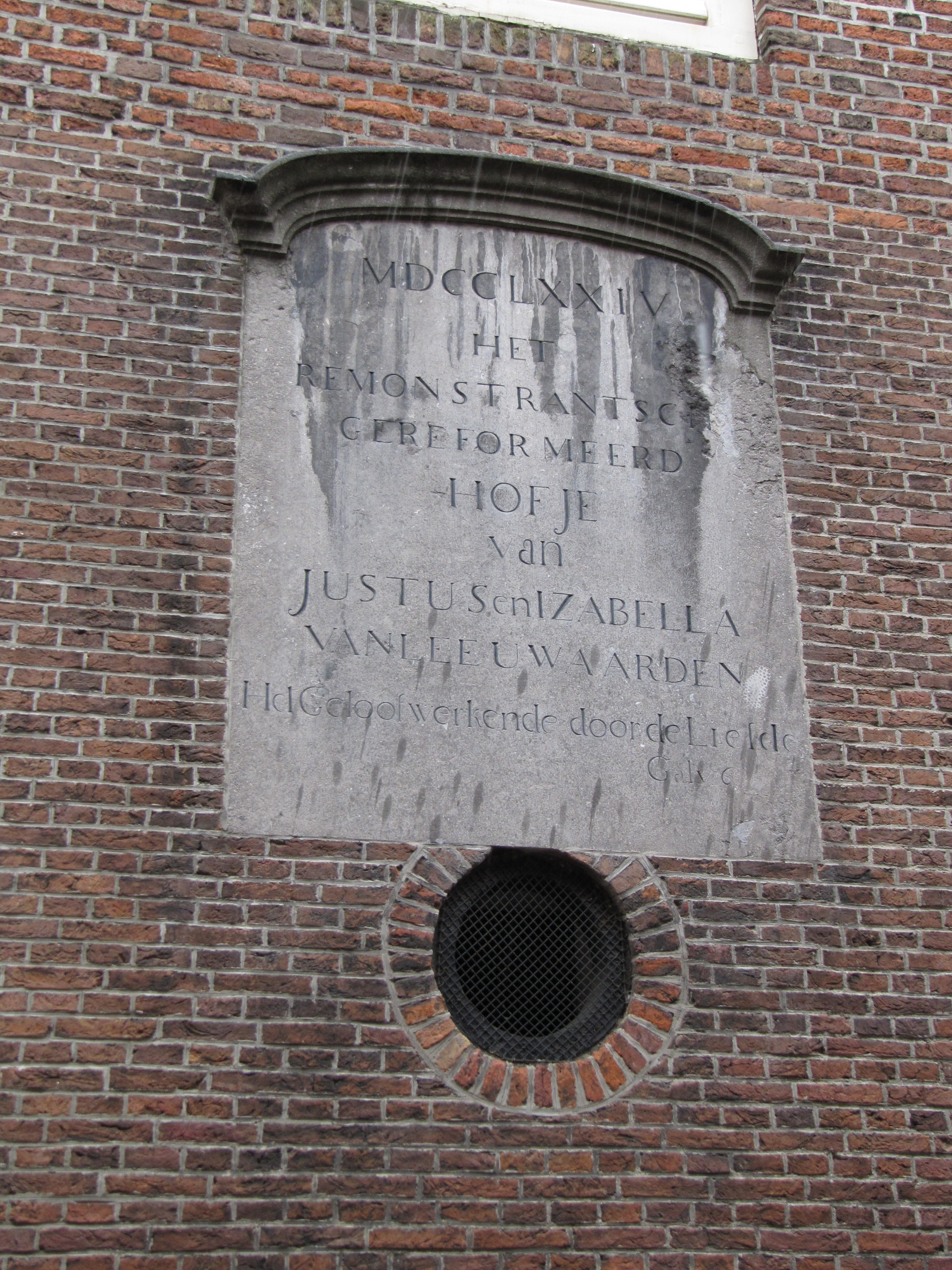
- Memorial plaque for the Hofje founders "Izabella" and her brother Justus
- Born: 1696
- Died: 19 June 1773 (aged 76–77)
- Spouse: Pieter Merkman Jr. (m. 1752)

Isabella van Leeuwarden (1696 – 19 June 1773) was a Dutch Mennonite businesswoman and hofje founder of Haarlem.

Van Leeuwarden was the daughter of Jacobus van Leeuwarden, owner of a velvet weaving business in Haarlem, and Maria Noordijk. She married the local poet Pieter Merkman Jr., owner of a ribbon-making business, on 8 November 1752 in Haarlem.

Her estate was sold by the local artist and art dealer Vincent Jansz van der Vinne in 1773 and a copy of the catalog lists her collection. Among other costly objects was a pair of pendant wedding portraits by Frans Hals dated 1643. The dress of the sitters show their sober Mennonite customs while also showing their wealth. For example, they are both dressed in black without fashionable wrist collars, but the man is holding an expensive watch and the woman is wearing a fur trimmed vlieger. Despite attempts to identify these portraits as members of her family, the dates on the portraits do not match those of any direct family members. Possibly the man is a member of the Haarlem Boeckels family of clockmakers who had a workshop on the Grote Markt, Haarlem in the 1640s.

Though Isabella herself came from a Mennonite family, she became Remonstrants and founded the Remonstrants Hofje in Haarlem. The company correspondence from her family cloth and ribbon business is preserved in the Amsterdam archives.

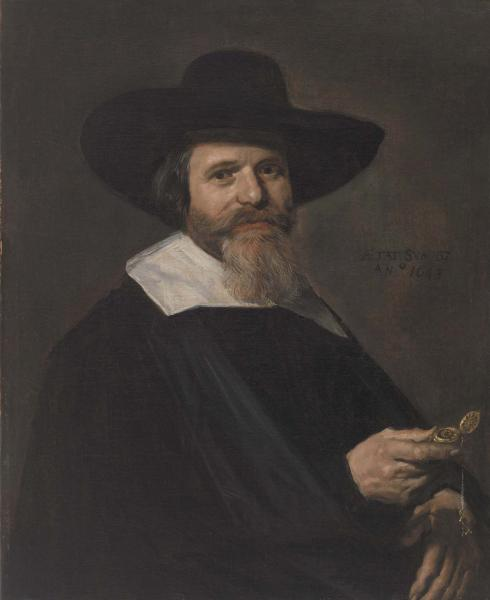
Portrait of a man

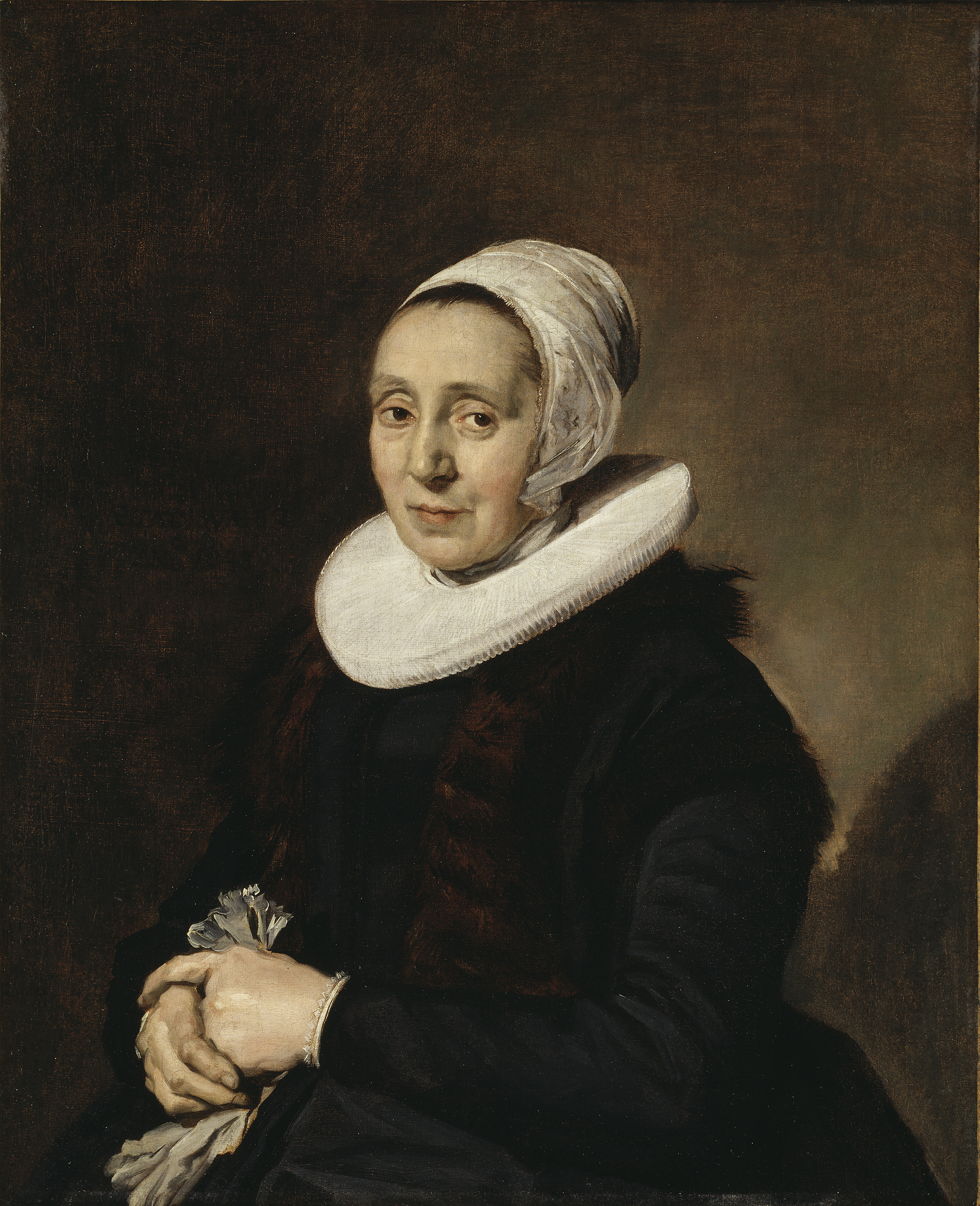
Portrait of a woman
