= Het Scheepje, Haarlem =

Het Scheepje
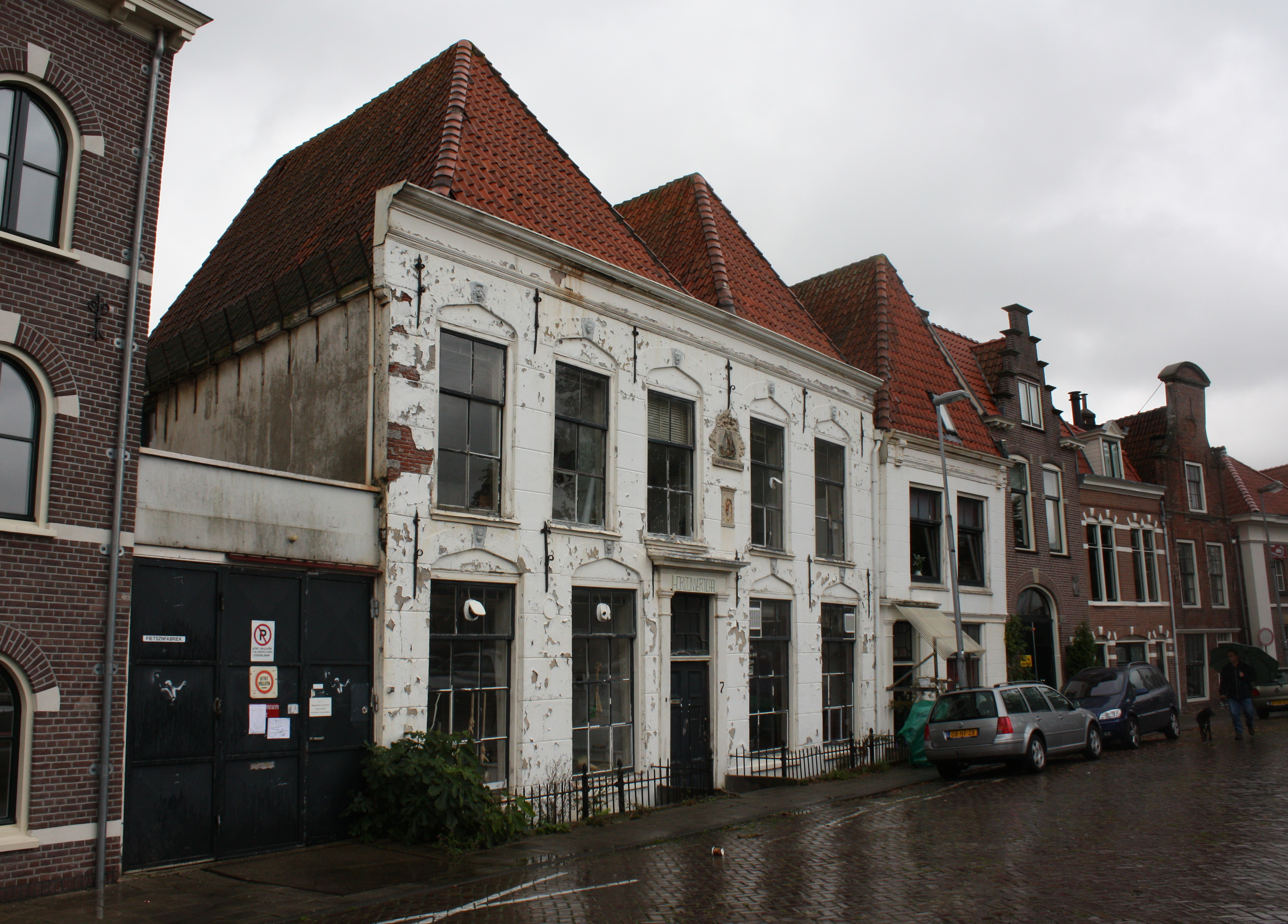
- Houtmarkt 7
- Interactive map of the Het Scheepje area

General information
- Type: Bier Brewery
- Location: Haarlem, Houtmarkt 7
- Coordinates: 52°22′53.04″N 4°38′44.32″E

Het Scheepje is the name of a former brewery in Haarlem on the Spaarne. It was owned for more than a century by the Dicx family, and it remained a brewery until the beginning of the 20th century. The historic contents of the old parlor were sold to the Philadelphia Museum of Art, where they are on show.

== History ==
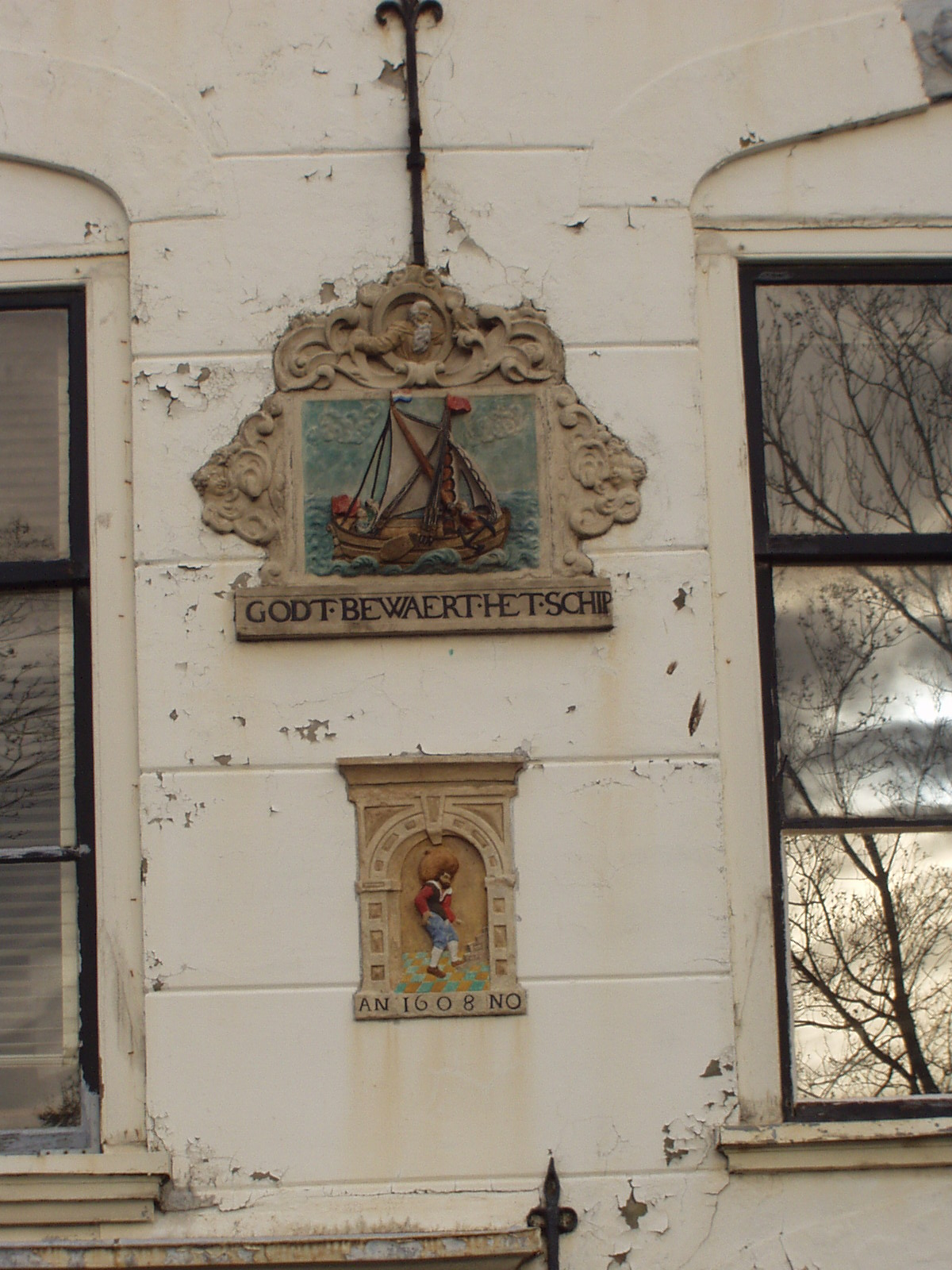
Gable stones on the facade

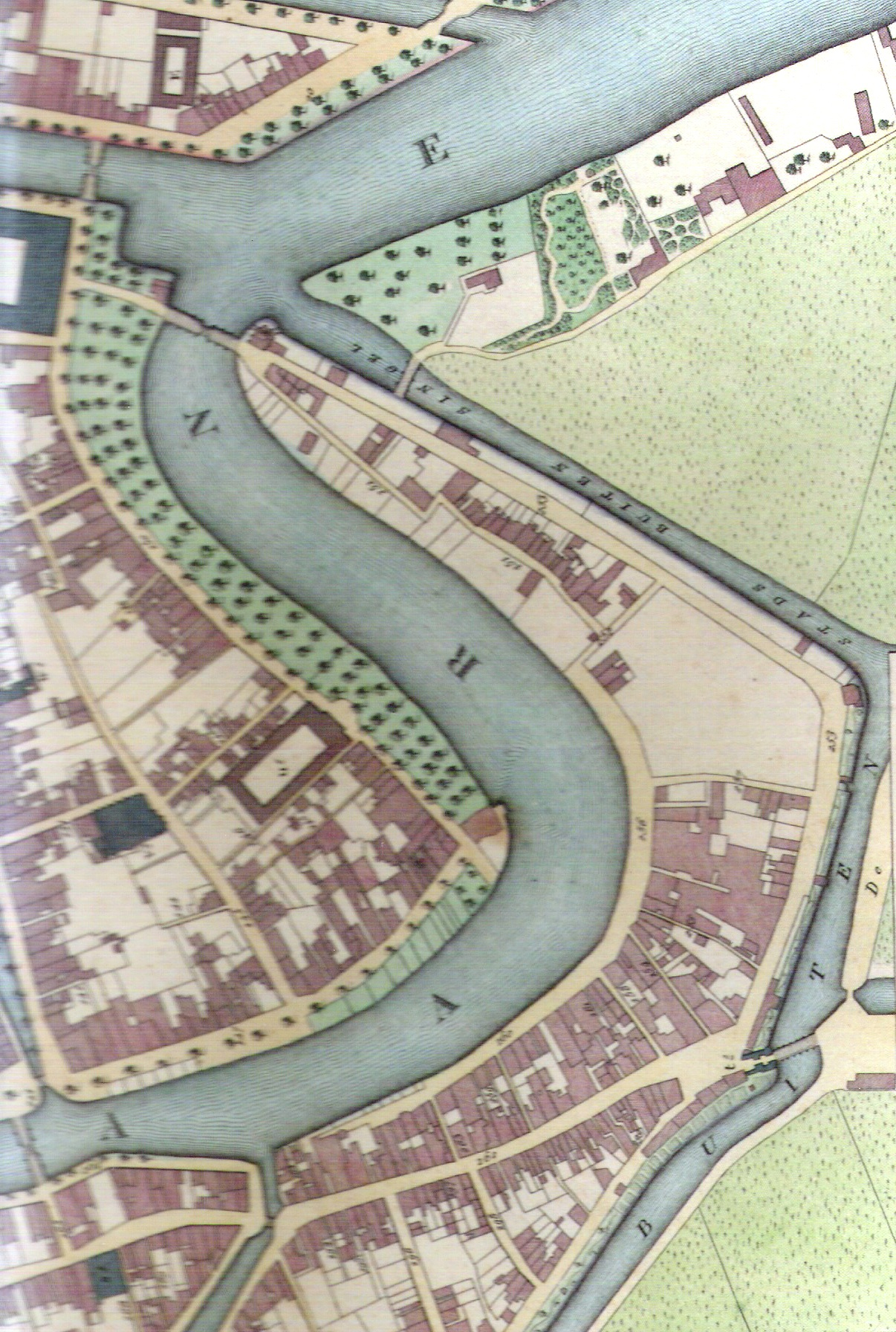
On this 1827 map of Haarlem, the complex can be seen on the right between the Spaarne and the Buiten-Stads-Singel as one large block extending across the thin strip of land from waterway to waterway, situated just below the empty lot.

In 1565 Dirck Diricksz. (ca. 1537–1618), a ship's captain, bought a house with property on the Scheepmakersdijk. At that time ships were built there (Shipbuilder's dike), but today this street is called the Houtmarkt. His son Dirck Diricksz. de Jonge (1571 1619) was also a captain, who married Cornelia Cornelisdr. Jonck (ca. 1570–1630) and had 4 children. In 1606 he bought a house next to his father's property, along with some other properties on the Scheepmakersdijk. He named his house "Scheepje", which means "little ship". Shortly after this he became a member of the brewer's guild, and in documents he is listed as owner of the brewery "Het Scheepje", which was part of the brewery "De Vogel Struijs", along with Johan Claesz Loo. Dirck Diricksz kept on purchasing properties until most of the brewery was his. In the facade of his former house a gable stone is a memorial to the old name with a picture of a sailing ship and the text "Godt bewaert het schip" (God saves the ship). In 1616 Dirck Diricksz received permission to build a windmill for grinding malt for beer. In 1618 he was promoted to mayor of Haarlem by Prince Maurits. His success did not last long however, and he died a year later, but his wife continued the beer business until her death in 1630. In June 1633 their daughter Agatha and her husband Nicolaes Olycan bought the inheritance rights of the remaining 3 children and took over the brewery and adjoining house.

Nicolaes Olycan, son of the brewer Pieter Jacobsz Olycan, was a member of the Haarlem brewing elite and until his death in 1639, he and his wife ran the brewery with great success. In 1631 the Amsterdam-Haarlem trekvaart was dug, which made it easier to export beer to Amsterdam by boat. Because the rear of the brewery was on the canal leading to the trekvaart, the brewery was located very advantageously for this business. The couple gave employment to many "zakkedragers" (carriers) for loading and unloading boats at the front and rear of the property. Another gable stone attests to this with the symbol of the carrier's guild, a man with a sack on his back. There was also a disadvantage to this location however. In the night of 14–15 November 1775, a flood caused the water to rise and the entire area of the Scheepmakersdijk came under water, and the windows of Het Scheepje were so low to the ground that the water came in through the windows.

Like her mother before her, Agatha continued the business after the death of her husband and when she died in 1667 it was taken over by her two daughters Marie and Alida. They called themselves Dicx, and it was descendants of this family, Catharina and Cornelia Dicx, who sold the brewery at auction in 1818.

== Rooms in Philadelphia ==
Het Scheepje remained a brewery until 1916 when it was sold to the Stuyt brothers, who were cheese traders. They rebuilt the premises for cheese storage in 1918 and had the 17th century parlor room dismantled for sale to H. H. Lugard Jr., who wanted to use it for a museum in Deventer. Before dismantling it, Karel Sluyterman had his engineering students make detailed sketches and photographs of the room. In 1926 many of the rooms in Het Scheepje were again redesigned when the premises became a printing shop. Little remains today of the original layout of the 17th century house.

The Deventer museum plans never materialized and the room contents were put up for sale again in 1923, when the Historical Society of Haarlem tried to purchase it for the Frans Hals Museum. It was bought by J.D. De Vries of New York, who in turn sold it to Edward Bok to be installed in the Philadelphia Museum of Art. Sluyterman was consulted and his drawings were used for the final installation in the museum.

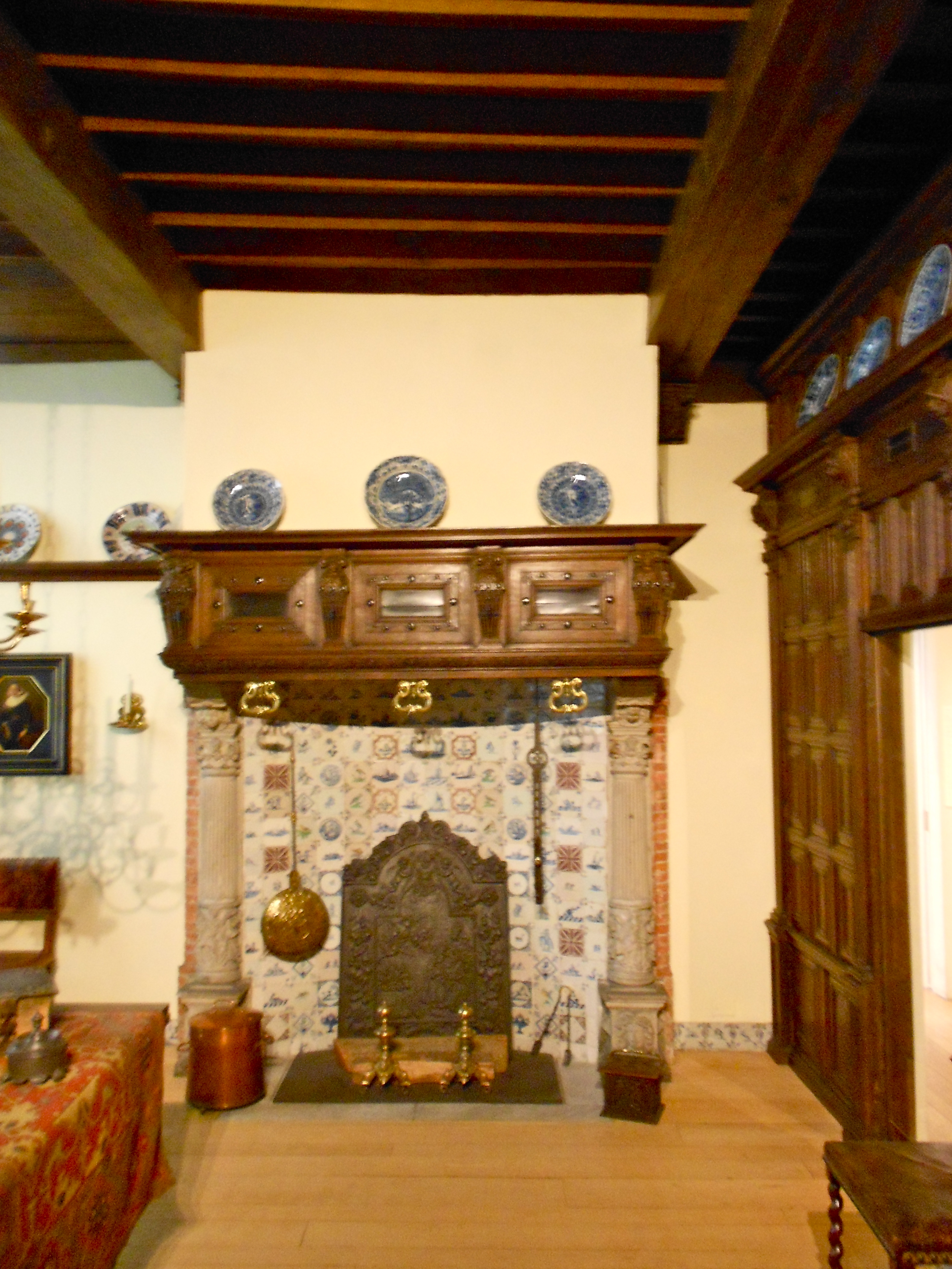
Hearth of the room in the Philadelphia museum

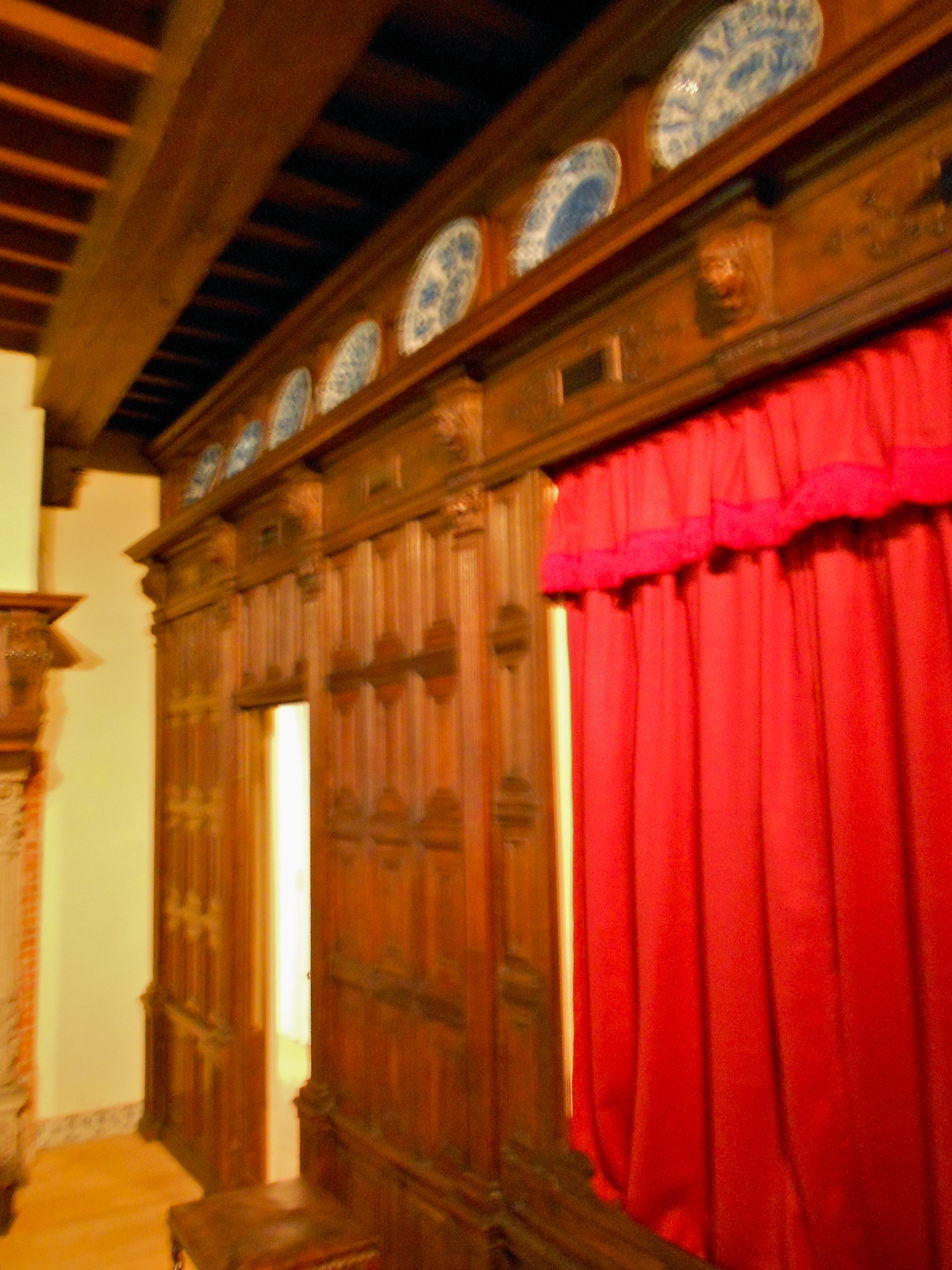
Bedstead of the room in the Philadelphia museum
