= Remonstrants Hofje =

Hofje in Haarlem, Netherlands

Coordinates: 52°23′00″N 4°38′01″E

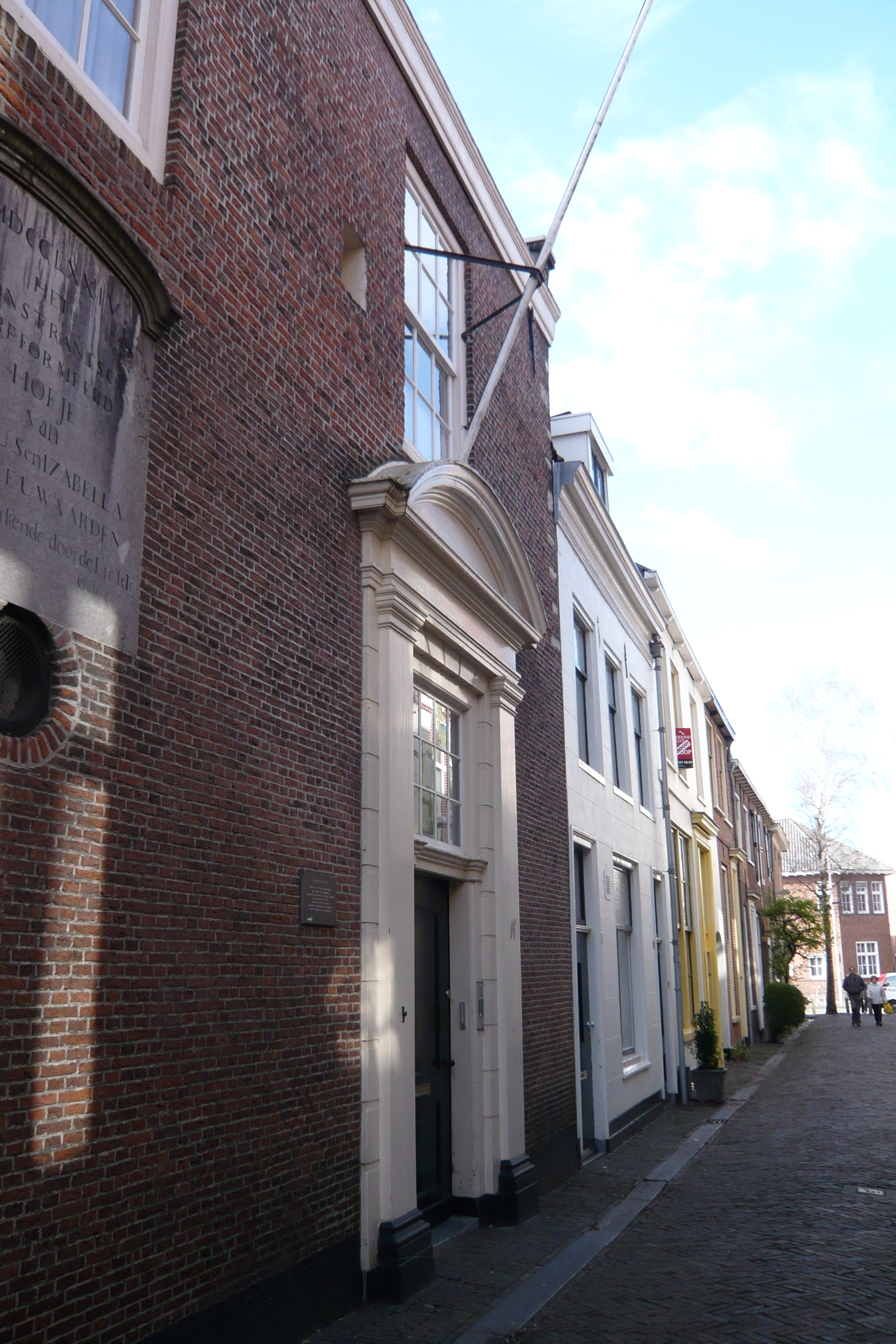
Remonstrantse hofje in the Ursulastraat in Haarlem

The Remonstrantshofje is a hofje (courtyard surrounded by almshouses) in Haarlem, Netherlands. It is one of the hofjes in Haarlem that is traditionally used to provide housing for elderly people.

It was founded in 1773 by Justus and Isabella van Leeuwarden on the site of the old Ursula cloister. The hofje has places for six women.

The entrance of the hofje is in a remaining wall of the old cloister, and the old cloister chapel serves as the entrance hall.
