= The Officers of the St Adrian Militia Company in 1630 =

Schutterstuk painted by Hendrik Gerritsz Pot

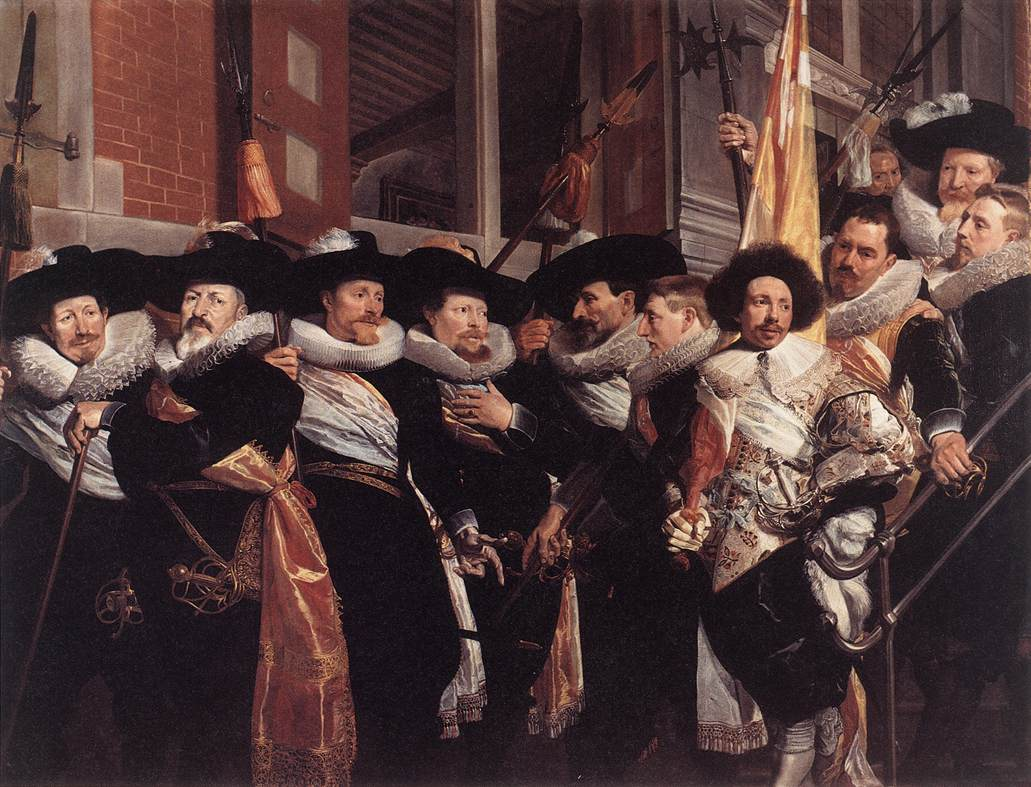
The Officers of the St Adrian Militia Company in 1630

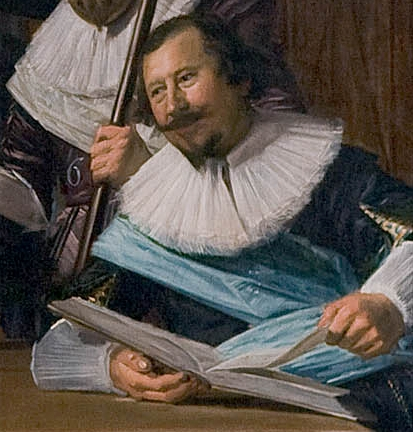
Portrait of Hendrik Gerritsz Pot in Hals Officers and sub-alterns of the Calivermen Civic Guard, Haarlem in 1633

The Officers of the St Adrian Militia Company in 1630 refers to the schutterstuk painted by Hendrik Gerritsz Pot for the Cluveniers, St. Adrian, or St. Hadrian civic guard of Haarlem, and today is considered one of the main attractions of the Frans Hals Museum there.

Unlike Hals' previous schutterstuk for this company, The Banquet of the Officers of the St Adrian Militia Company in 1627, in which all officers are seated at a banquet, here the men are standing outside on the steps of their meeting hall holding their weapons that display their rank. Ensign Salomon Colterman (with afro hairstyle) holds the flag and displays a lovely cut sleeve jacket with coloured brocade. Colonel Pieter Jacobsz Olycan is wearing an orange sash and holding his commander's staff, and the other officers are holding their spontoons.

Officers were selected by the council of Haarlem to serve for three years, and this group had just finished their tenure and celebrated their end of service with a portrait. Frans Hals painted them in 1627 in a banquet setting, and after Pot painted them outside here in 1630, Hals painted them outside again in 1633, and included Pot himself (who posed in his role as Lieutenant) on the right with a book.

The men featured are from left to right Captain Pieters Maertensz Oudewaagh, Colonel Pieter Jacobsz Olycan, Captain Dirck Herculesz Schatter, Captain Jonas de Jongh, Lieutenant Jan Willemsz Beelt, Lieutenant Florens Pietersz van der Hoeff, Ensign Salomon Colterman, Sergeant Nicolaes Olycan, Kastelein (concierge) Willem Ruychaver, Sergeant Hendrick Claesz Everswijn, and Sergeant Jacob Buttinga.

== St. Adriansdoelen ==
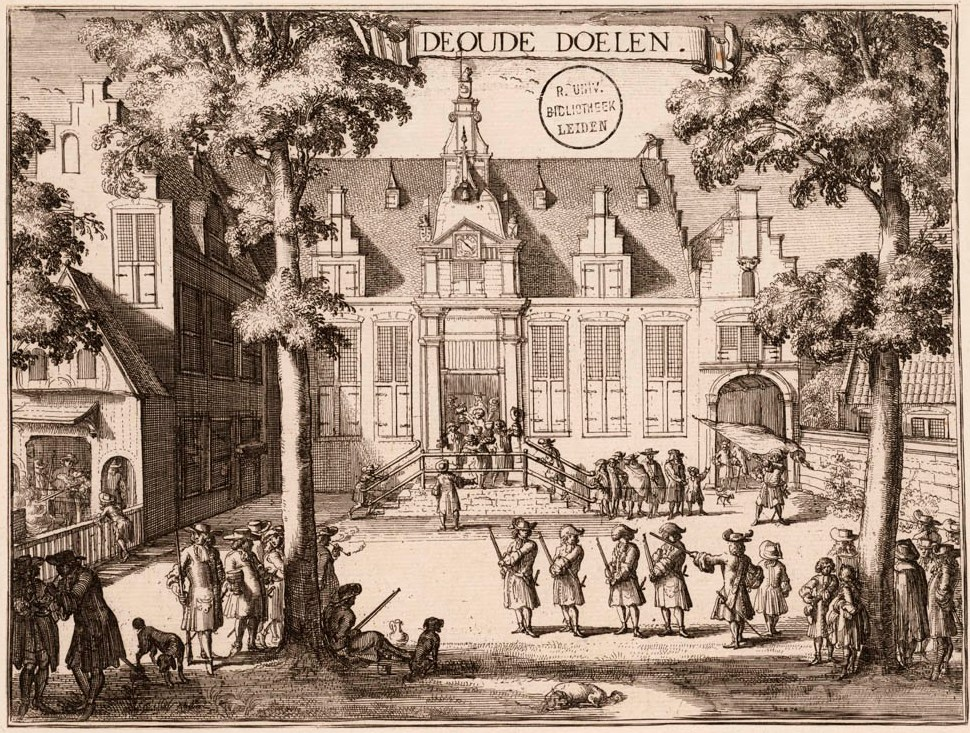
1688 engraving of the guardsmen practising in the yard of the old meeting hall (showing the steps with rails that they are standing on in the painting).

The painting previously hung with others in the old "Doelen" hall, which is today part of the Haarlem Public Library. The paintings by Pot, Hals and others that formerly hung in this hall have been since transferred to the Frans Hals Museum. This painting hung in the Doelen until 1820 when it was moved to the city hall, and in 1962 it was given to the museum as part of the 100 anniversary celebration of the Haarlem municipal museum.
