= Aletta Hanemans =

Dutch brewer (1606–1653)

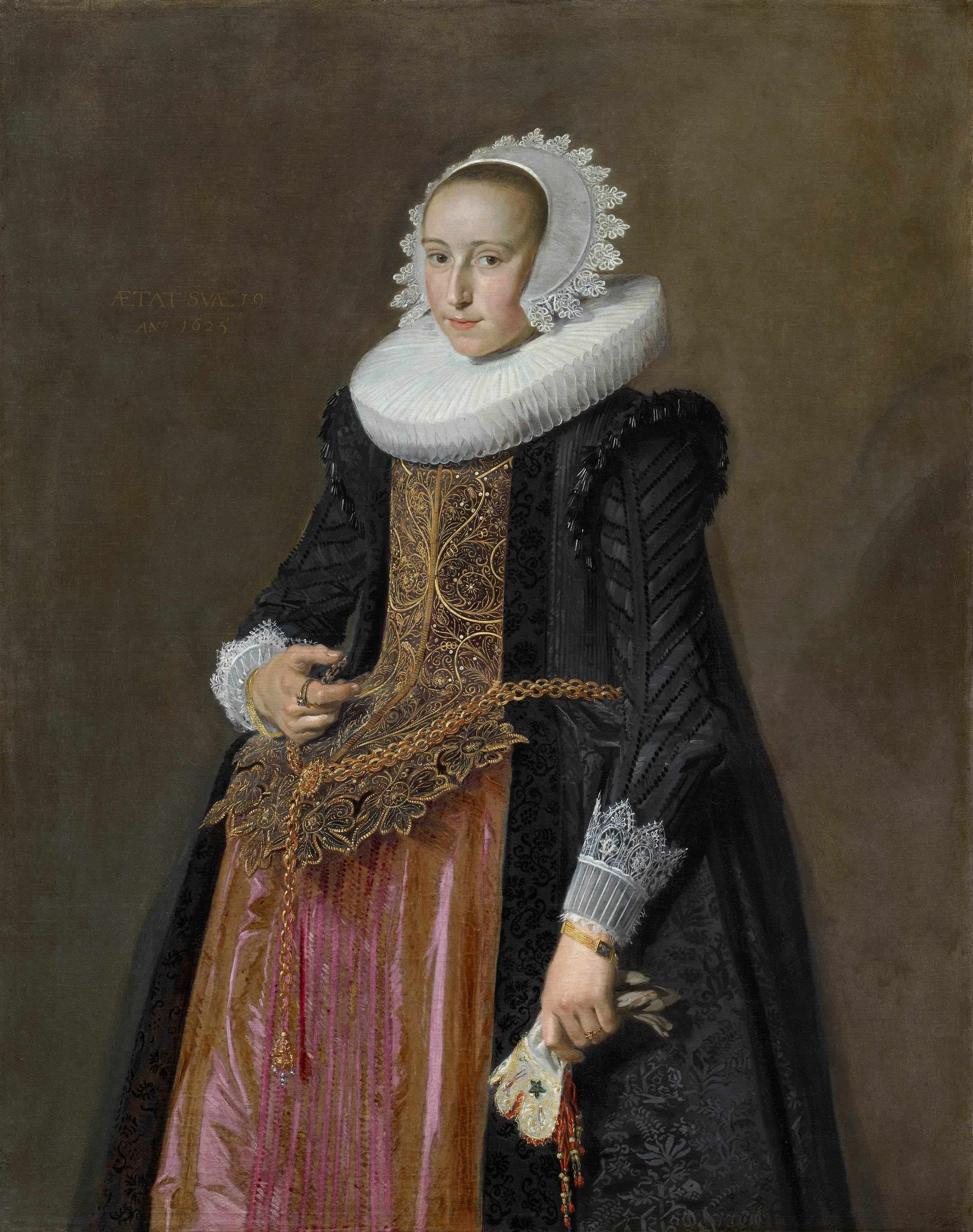
Portrait of Aletta Hanemans by Frans Hals, collection Mauritshuis, 1625

Aletta Hanemans (1606–1653), was a Dutch brewer. She became the brewer of the Hoeffijser in Haarlem. She is best known today for her marriage portrait by Frans Hals, painted when she married the brewer, magistrate, and later mayor of Haarlem, Jacob Pietersz Olycan in 1624.

== Biography ==
Little is known of her early life, but her father was probably a professional acquaintance of her husband's father Pieter Jacobsz Olycan, who had grown up in his father's oil and grain shop in Amsterdam. Though she married Jacob in Zwolle, the young couple was back in Haarlem in 1625, when Hals painted their pendant portraits. Their brewery called the Hoeffijser or Hoef-yzer was located on the Donkere Spaarne (near the Teylers Hofje today). It had been given to Jacob by his parents, after he had spent his youth in training there. After Jacob died in 1638, Aletta remarried another Haarlem brewer, Nicolaes van Loo (1607-1641), but he died soon after. She then continued the business on her own, probably assisted by her parents-in-law and later assisted by her daughter Johanna Olijcan, who eventually married the brewer Mattheus Claesz Everszwijn and continued the brewery.

Both of Aletta's husbands were painted by Frans Hals:

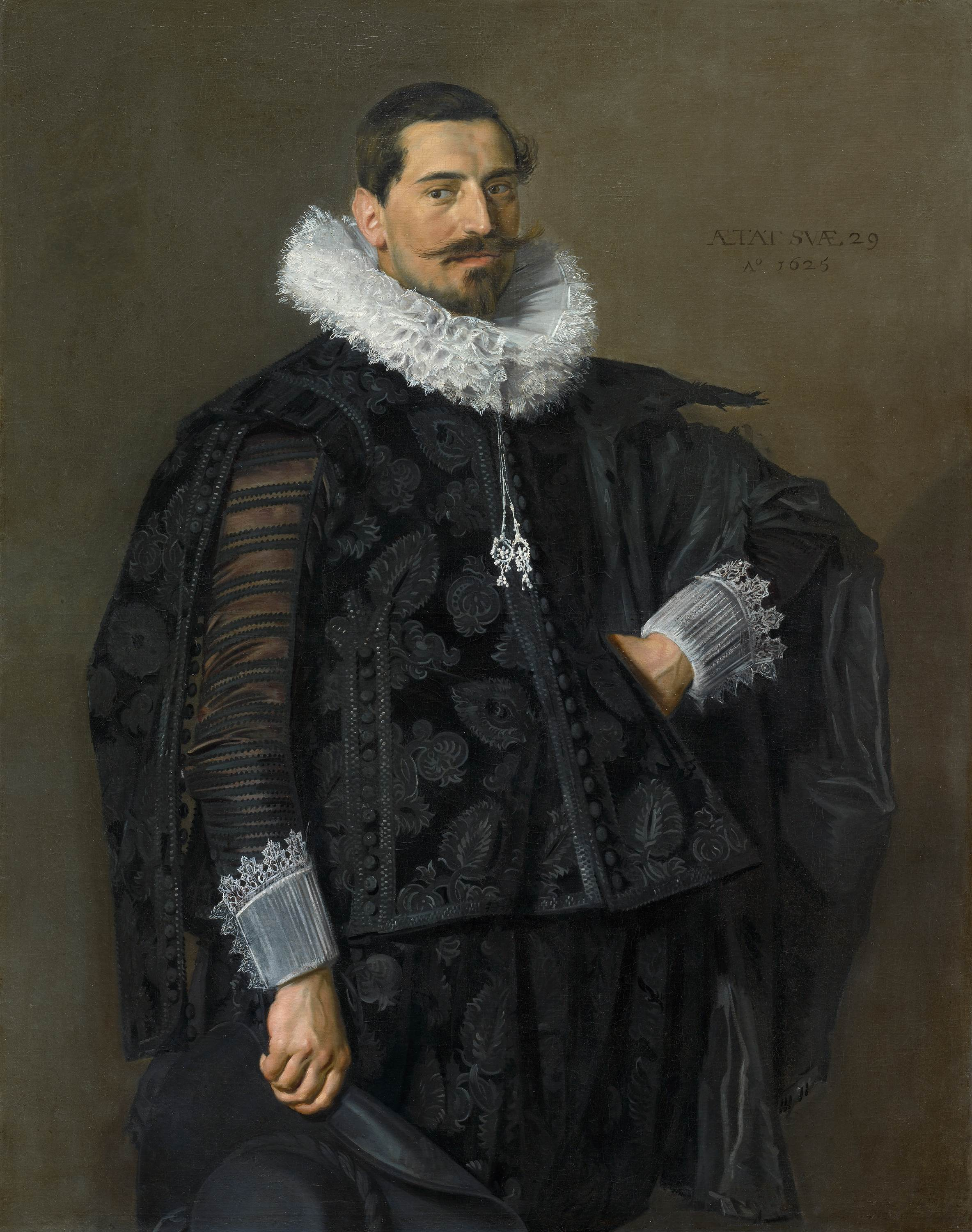
Her first husband Jacob Pietersz Olycan

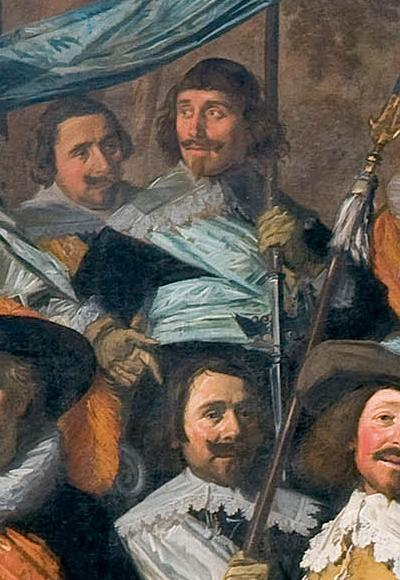
Her second husband Nicolaas van Loo in 1639 (it looks like he is about to stab Francois Woutersz below him)

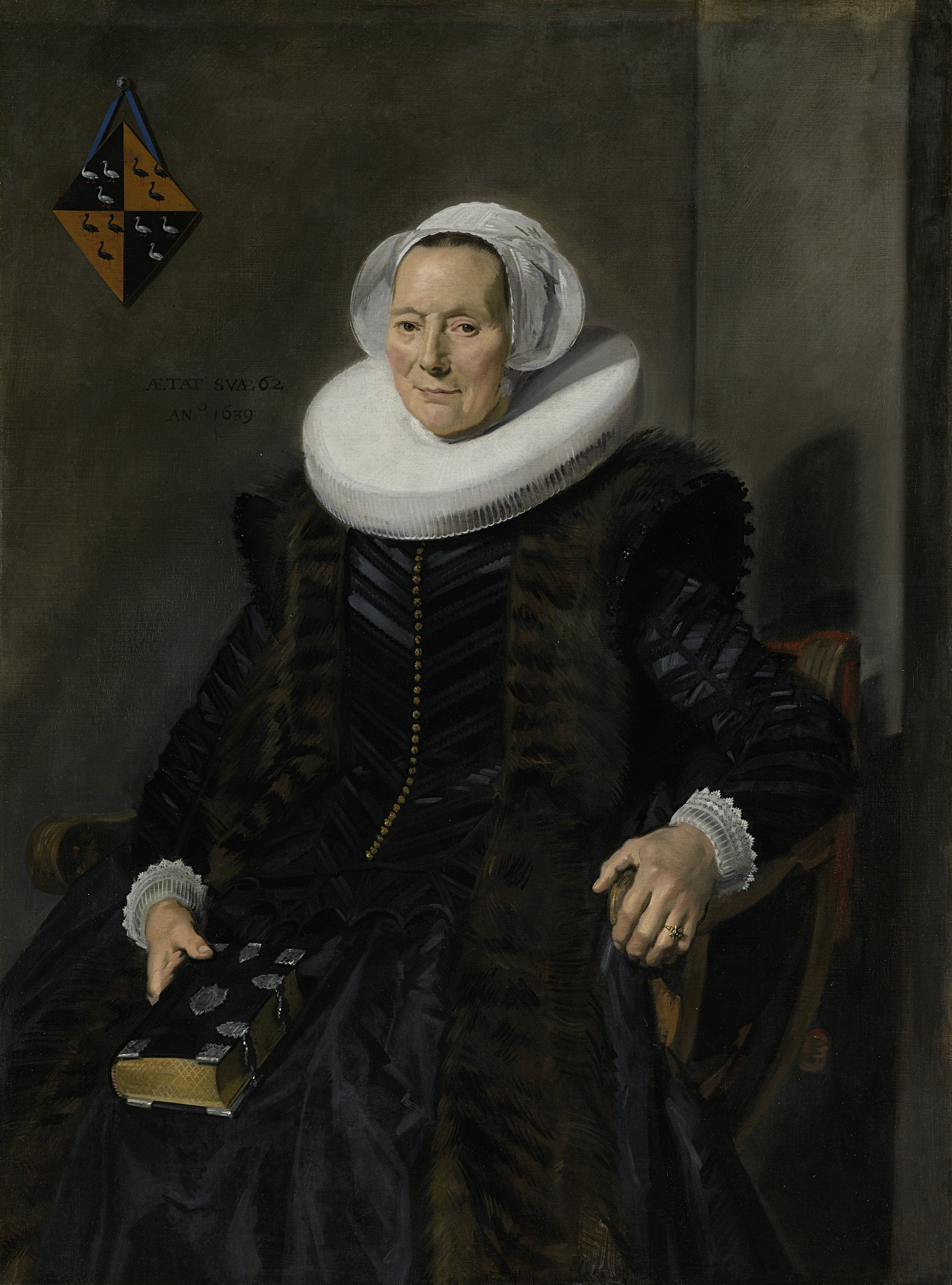
Portrait of her mother-in-law Maritge Voogt Claesdr, former owner of the Hoeffijser

== Hals portrait (1625; restored 2007) ==
Aletta is wearing a costly bridal stomacher called a "bruidsborst", worked with gold thread and showing various flowers symbolizing marriage. She wears it over a colorful purple and red skirt that is draped over a French fardegalijn, a wheel shaped device meant to extend the skirt, causing the stomacher to protrude forward and which supported the heavy gold chain wrapped around her gown and through her vlieger. The vlieger was a full-length sleeveless robe open in front and with two holes at the side for a belt chain. Her vlieger is edged with black velvet and shows off her stomacher and skirt. Her sleeves are attached via shoulder wings to her dress with small silver aglets. Around her neck she is wearing a starched linen figure-eight collar, and over her hair she is wearing a diadem cap with lace edging. She is holding a pair of embroidered bridal gloves and wears a wedding ring on her right forefinger. She is also wearing gold bracelets and lace wrist collars and her ensemble shows her to be one of Hals' most wealthy sitters.

== See also ==
- Jacob Pietersz Olycan, her first husband
- The Banquet of the Officers of the St George Militia Company in 1627, featuring her first husband seated in the middle
- The Officers of the St George Militia Company in 1639, showing her second husband with his spontoon pointed downwards
- Pieter Jacobsz Olycan, her father-in-law
- Andries van Hoorn, her brother-in-law
- List of paintings by Frans Hals
