= The Officers of the St Adrian Militia Company in 1633 =

Painting by Frans Hals

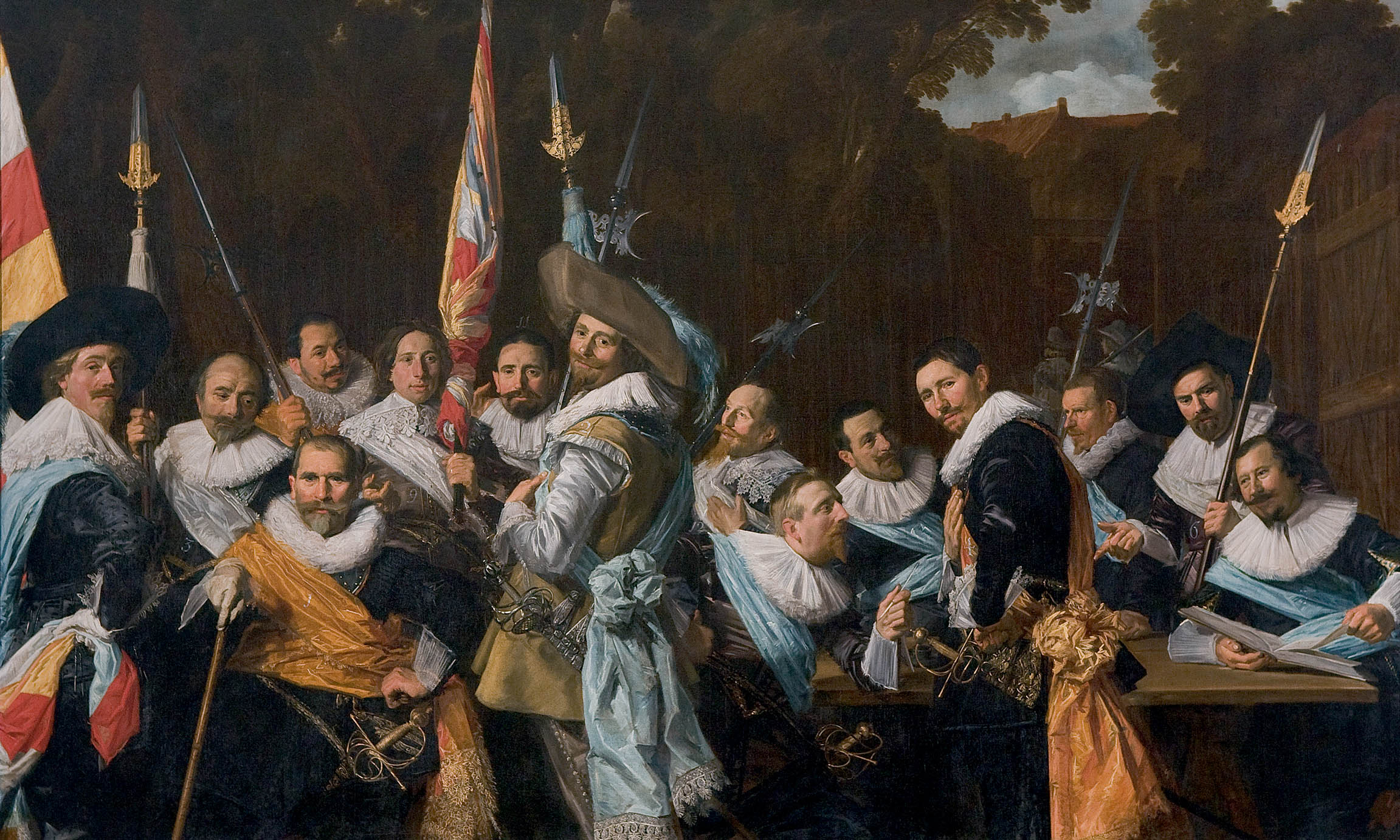
The Officers of the St Adrian Militia Company in 1633

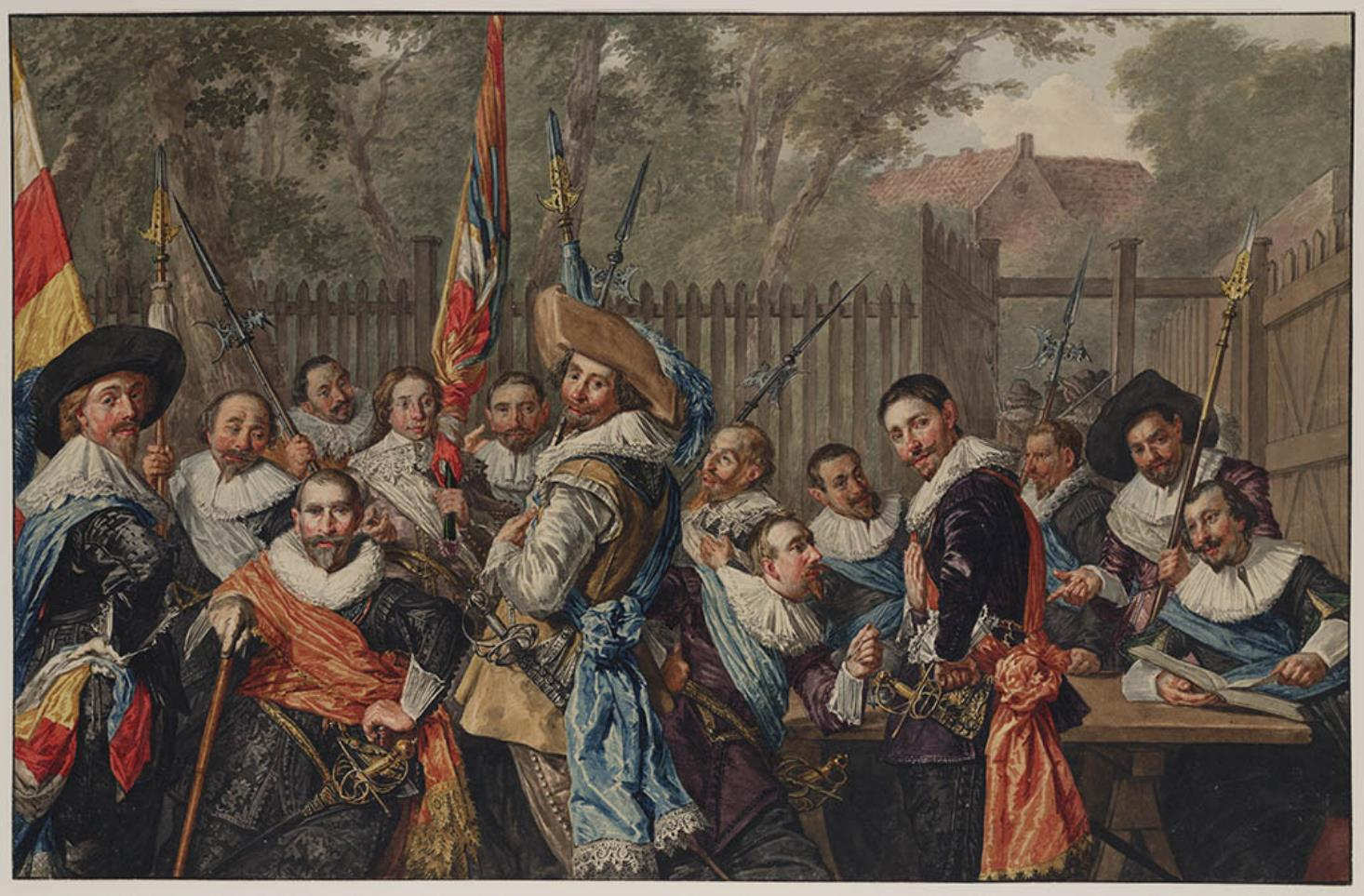
This 18th-century copy by Wybrand Hendriks shows how much darker the painting has become over the centuries.

The Officers of the St Adrian Militia Company in 1633 refers to the second schutterstuk painted by Frans Hals for the Cluveniers, St. Adrian, or St. Hadrian civic guard of Haarlem, in 1633, and today considered one of the main attractions of the Frans Hals Museum there.

Unlike Hals' previous schutterstuk for this company, The Banquet of the Officers of the St Adrian Militia Company in 1627 in which all officers are seated at a banquet wearing the colors of the Dutch flag - oranje-blanje-bleu, in this version, the men are seated outside in the courtyard wearing sashes showing the colour of the officer's "rot", with the Ensign Jacob Hofland holding the flag of the blue rot, and Ensign Jacob Steyn holding the flag for the white rot. Because they are outside, they are holding their weapons. For the first time the sergeants are shown, holding halberds to differentiate them from officers with spontoons.

Officers were selected by the council of Haarlem to serve for three years, and this group had just finished their tenure and celebrated their end of service with a portrait. This was not the first time they were portrayed outside. After Hals painted them in 1627, Hendrick Gerritsz Pot painted them in 1630 on the steps just outside their hall where the other earlier paintings hung. In this version painted for the next three-year service period, the man with the orange sash seated on the left and looking directly at the viewer is Colonel Johan Claesz Loo, heading the table.

The men featured are from left to right Ensign Jacob Hofland, Captain Cornelis Backer, Sergeant Dirck Verschuyl (standing in background with halberd), Colonel Johan Claesz Loo (sitting in foreground with right hand on commander's staff), Ensign Jacob Steyn (flag in left hand), Sergeant Balthasar Baudaert (standing in background), Captain Johan Schatter (standing with magnificent blue sash with bow), Sergeant Cornelis Jansz Ham (balding, sitting behind the table), Lieutenant Jacob Pietersz Buttinga (foreground), Sergeant Hendrik van den Boom (background), Captain Andries van Hoorn (standing with orange sash with bow, and behind his head in the distance two guards can be seen), Sergeant Barent Mol (standing behind the table), Lieutenant Nicolaes Olycan (standing and pointing his finger), Lieutenant Hendrick Gerritsz Pot (sitting with book).

== St. Adriansdoelen ==
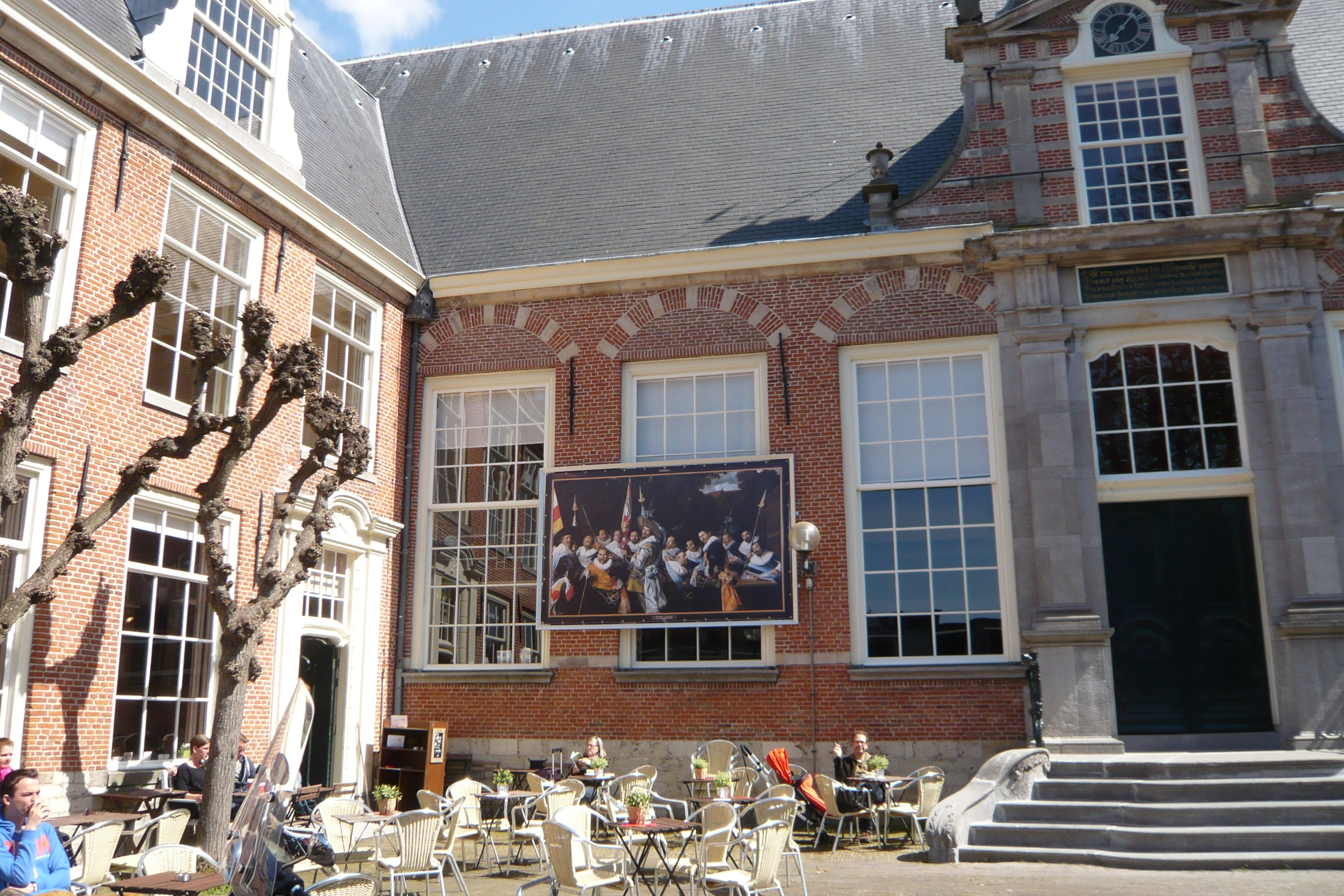
View of a life-size reproduction of this painting decorating the old meeting hall at what is today the Haarlem Public Library.

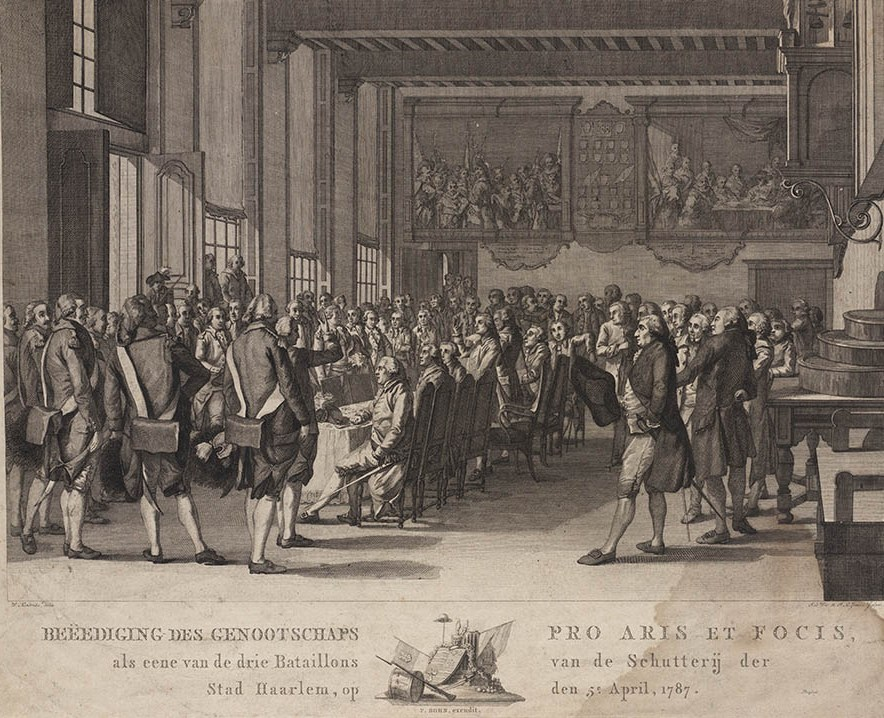
Engraving by Wybrand Hendriks of the start of Pro Aris et Focis in 1787. This painting can be seen hanging on the rear wall.

The painting previously hung with others in the old "Doelen" hall, which is today part of the Haarlem Public Library. The paintings by Hals and others that formerly hung in this hall have been since transferred to the Frans Hals Museum, though because they are so large, not all of these paintings are on display.

During the Batavian Revolution the schuttersgilde of St. Adrian was disbanded in favor of a new "Patriotic people's militia" called Pro Aris et Focis. The local artist Wybrand Hendriks commemorated the event with an engraving of the meeting, and this painting is shown hanging side by side with a later schutterstuk by Pieter Soutman.

== See also ==
- List of paintings by Frans Hals
