= Jacob Pietersz Olycan =

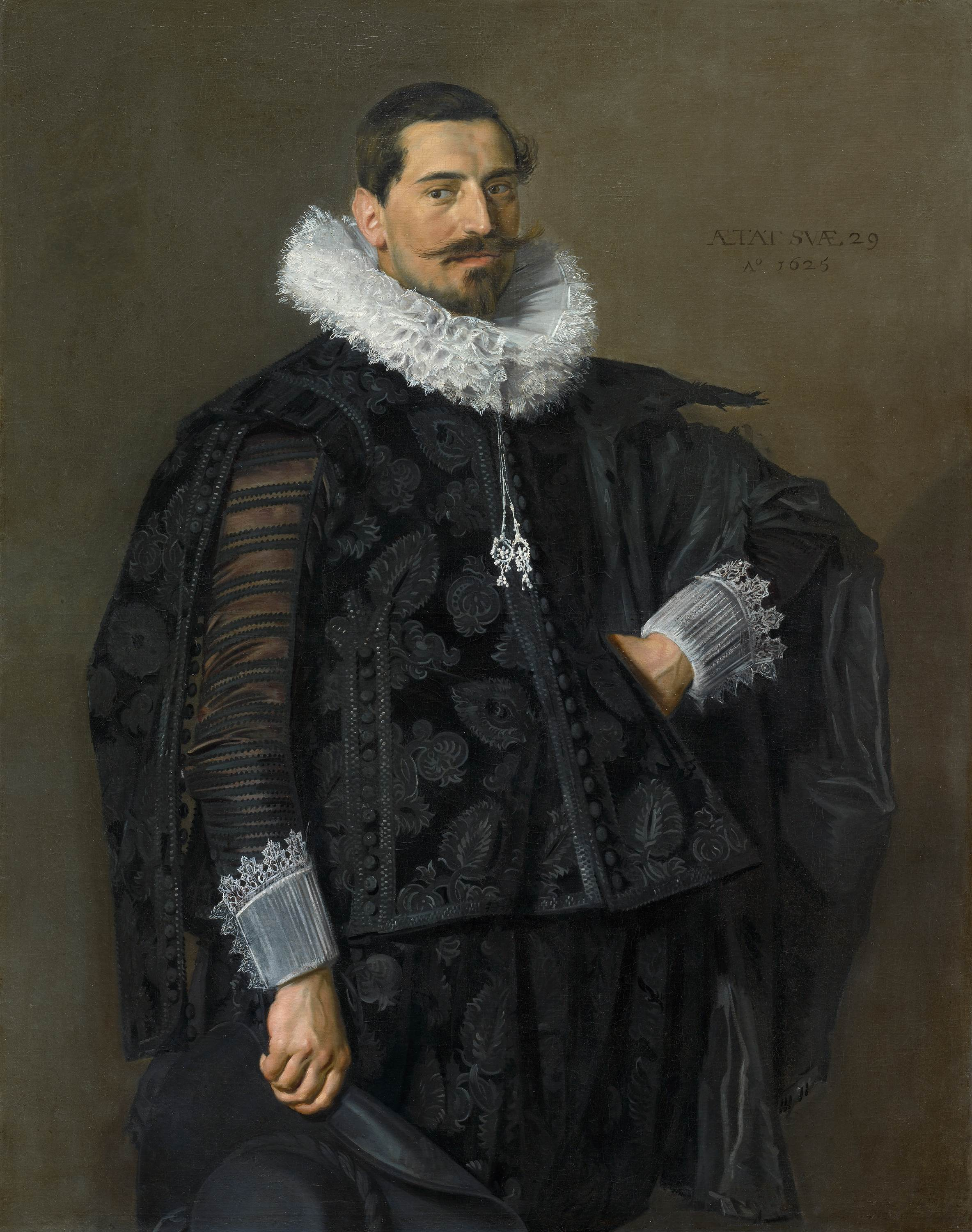
Portrait of Jacob Pietersz Olycan by Frans Hals

Jacob Pietersz Olycan (1596 – 1638), was a brewer, magistrate, and later mayor of Haarlem, best known today for his portrait by Frans Hals, pendant to the portrait of Aletta Hannemans, whom he married in Zwolle in 1624.

== Biography ==
He was the son of Pieter Jacobsz Olycan and Maria Claesdr Voogt. He worked in his father's brewery in Haarlem, but married Aletta in Zwolle. They were back in Haarlem in 1625, when Hals painted their pendant portraits. The breweries owned by the Olycans were the Vogelstruys and the Hoeffijser.

Olycan featured in a Hals painting again as the central figure seated in the portrait of The Banquet of the Officers of the St George Militia Company in 1627. He is shown in the position of Lieutenant that he served 1624–1627. In 1639 his parents also commissioned 2 sets of pendant portraits to be painted by Frans Hals.

After Jacob died young a few years later, his widow Aletta married Nicolaes van Loo in 1641.

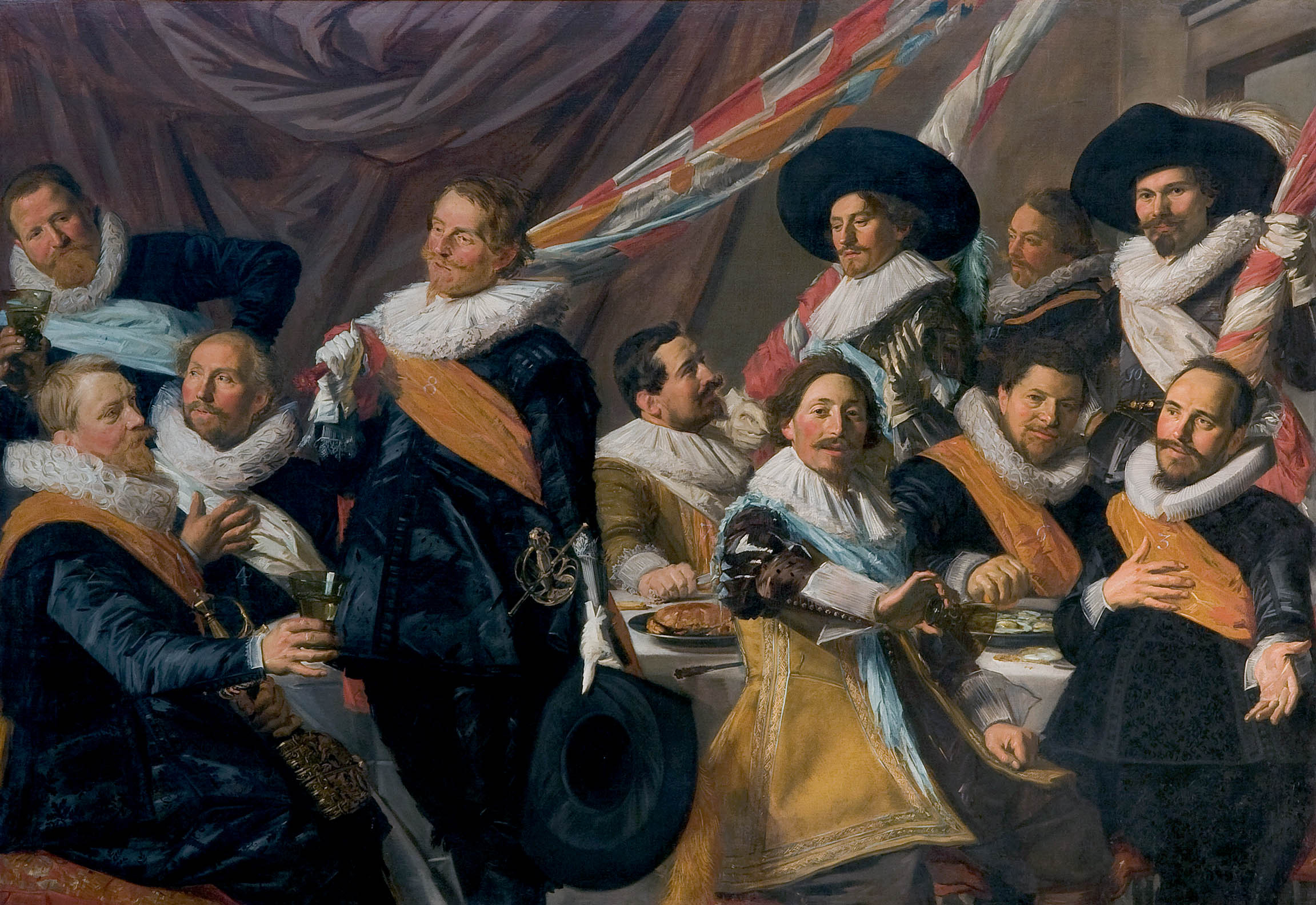
Olycan as the seated central figure in Officers of the St. George Civic Guard, Haarlem, 1627

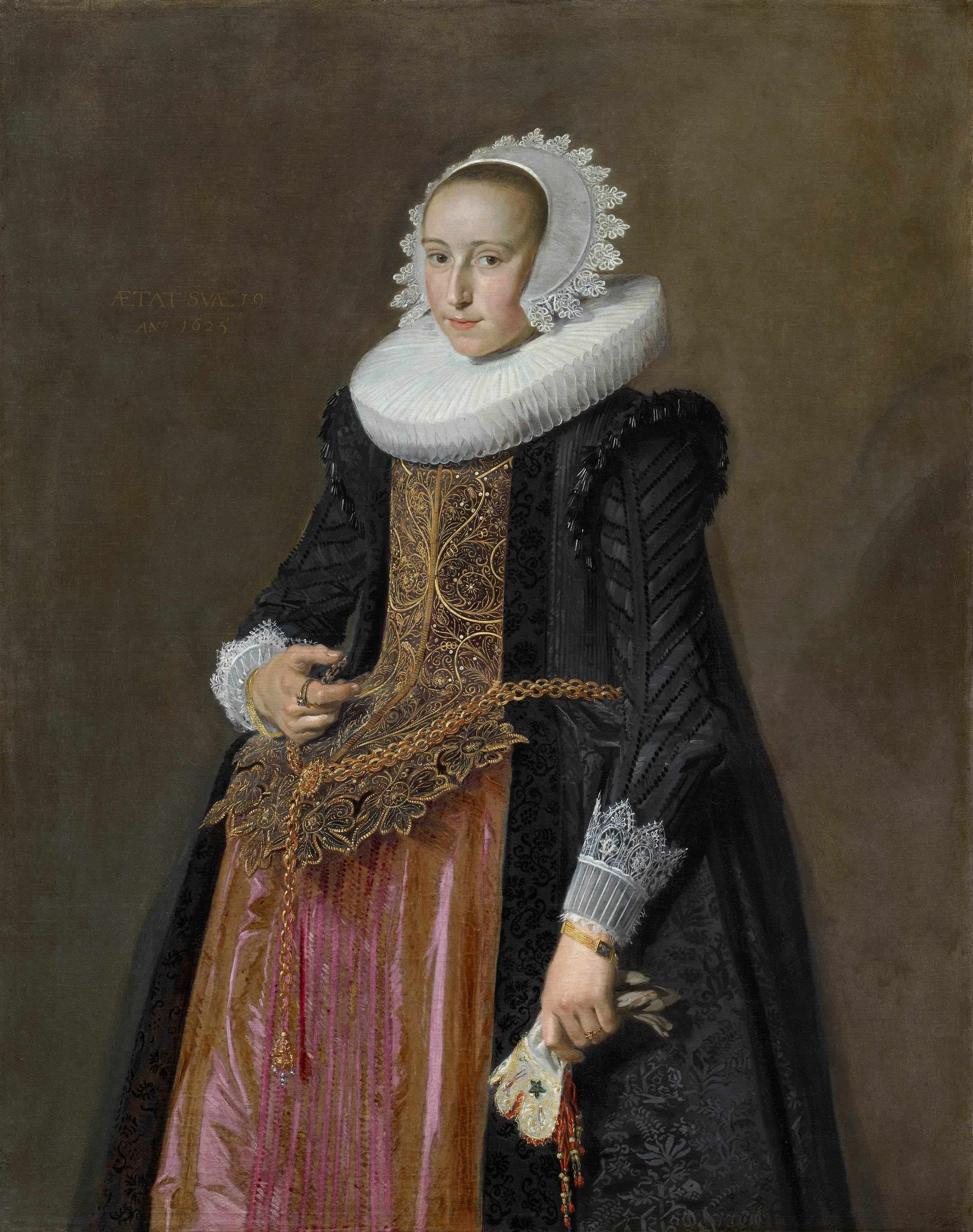
Aletta Hannemans in 1625 (wedding portrait)
