= Vlieger, North West =

Vlieger
- Location within North West (South African province) Location within South Africa
- Coordinates: 26°13′11″S 26°48′47″E
- Country: South Africa
- Province: North West
- District: Dr Kenneth Kaunda
- Municipality: JB Marks

Area
  - Total: 1.60 km^{2} (0.62 sq mi)

Population (2011)
  - Total: 4,438
  - Density: 2,770/km^{2} (7,180/sq mi)

Racial makeup (2011)
  - Black African: 97.7%
  - Coloured: 2.0%
  - Indian/Asian: 0.1%
  - Other: 0.2%

First languages (2011)
  - Tswana: 81.9%
  - Xhosa: 3.9%
  - English: 3.8%
  - Afrikaans: 3.3%
  - Other: 7.1%
- Time zone: UTC+2 (SAST)
- Area code: 018

Vlieger is a 98% Black African village in Dr Kenneth Kaunda District Municipality, North West Province, South Africa.
