= Vlieger (cape) =

16th-17th C. European women's garment

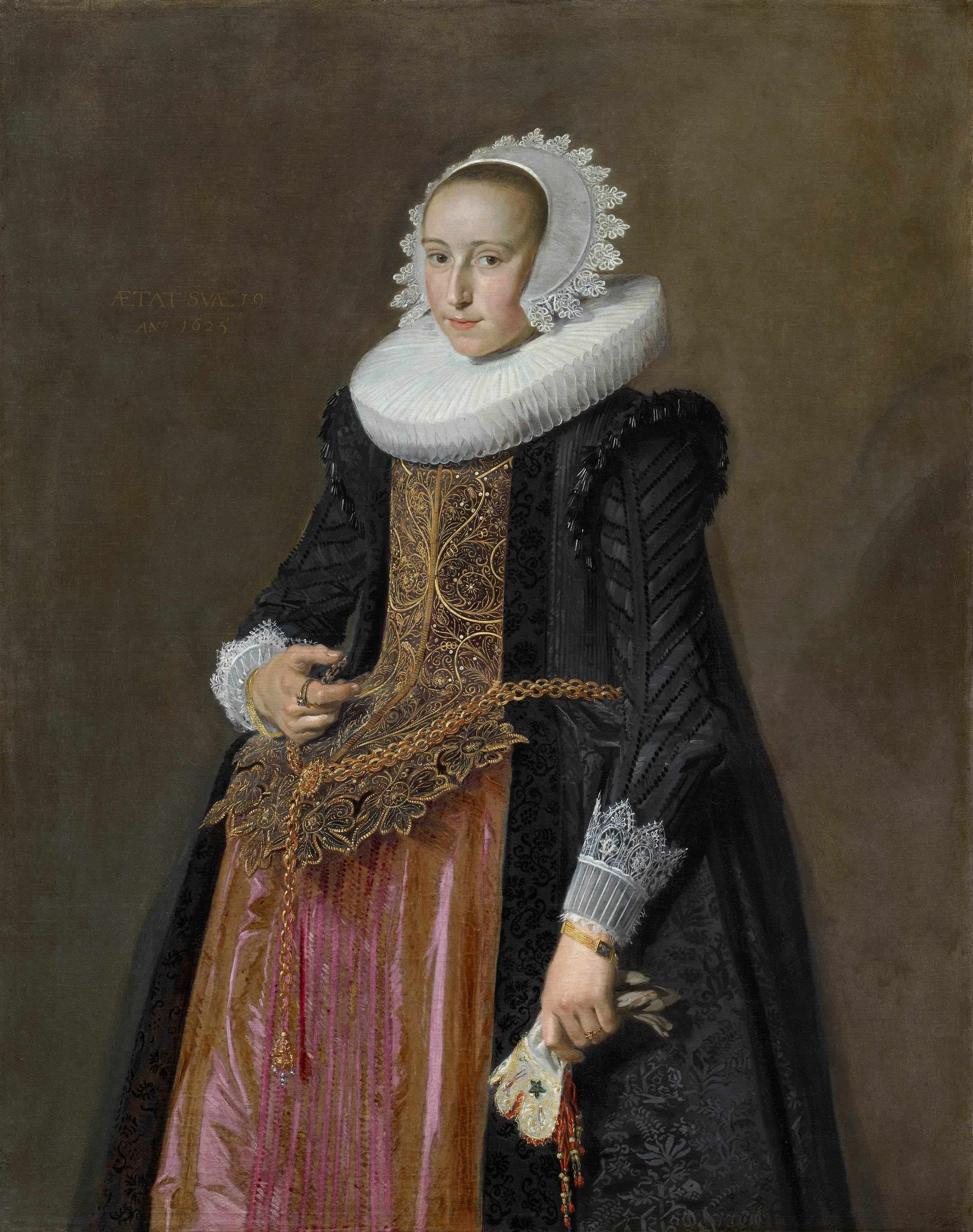
- Portrait of Aletta Hanemans wearing a black vlieger with attached sleeves, by Frans Hals

A vlieger is a type of full-length sleeveless over-gown or 'cape-with-slits-for-armholes' worn by married Dutch women in the late 16th and early 17th centuries. Variations with short sleeves or high shoulder rolls are known. Sometimes sleeves were attached with aiglets, and often slits were made to allow belts or the hands to pass through.

In the Dutch Republic during the early 17th-century the vlieger was often worn with a millstone collar (a wide starched ruff). The vlieger was always black and always worn with a skirt, usually of the type fardegalijn. The black-on-black look after the Reformation makes them hard to distinguish in portraits if the sleeves and skirt are also black, but they can usually be inferred from a more colorful stomacher or belt-chain that makes the black silhouette stand out.

Vliegers:

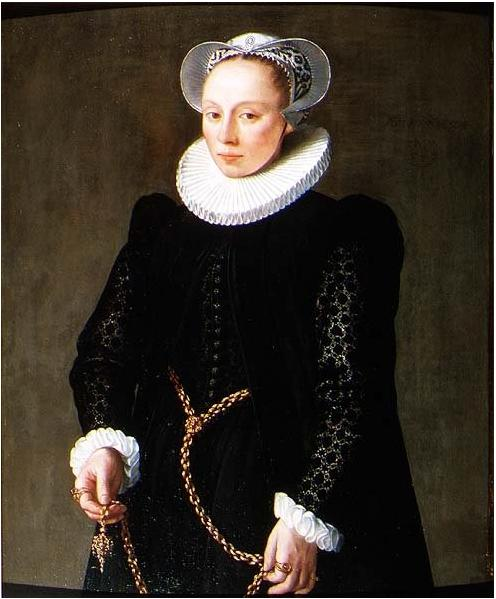
A woman aged 24 with vlieger, 1587

Maria Claesdr. Chijs in a fur-lined vlieger, 1600

Young woman in a vlieger, 1612

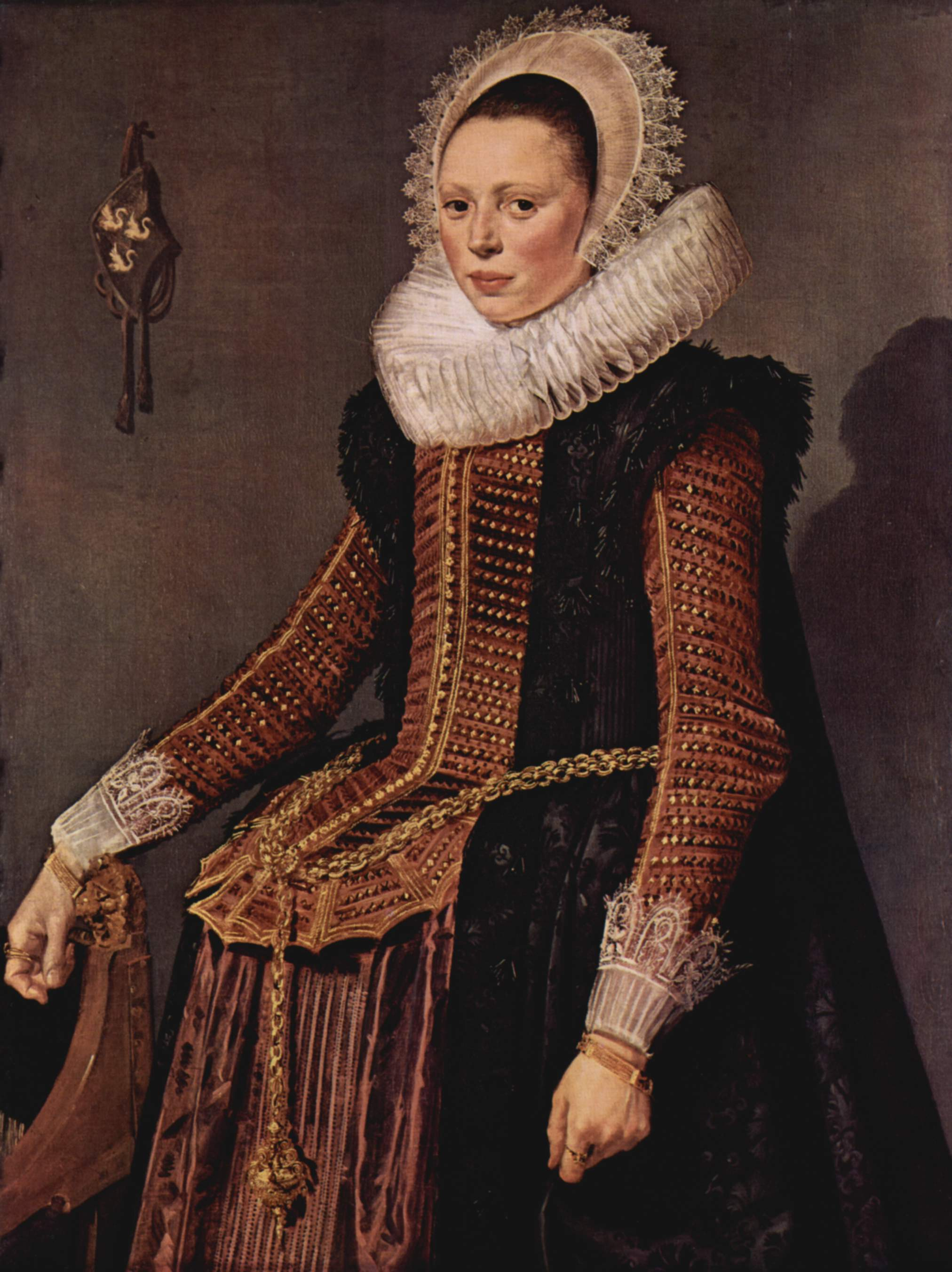
Young woman in a vlieger, 1618

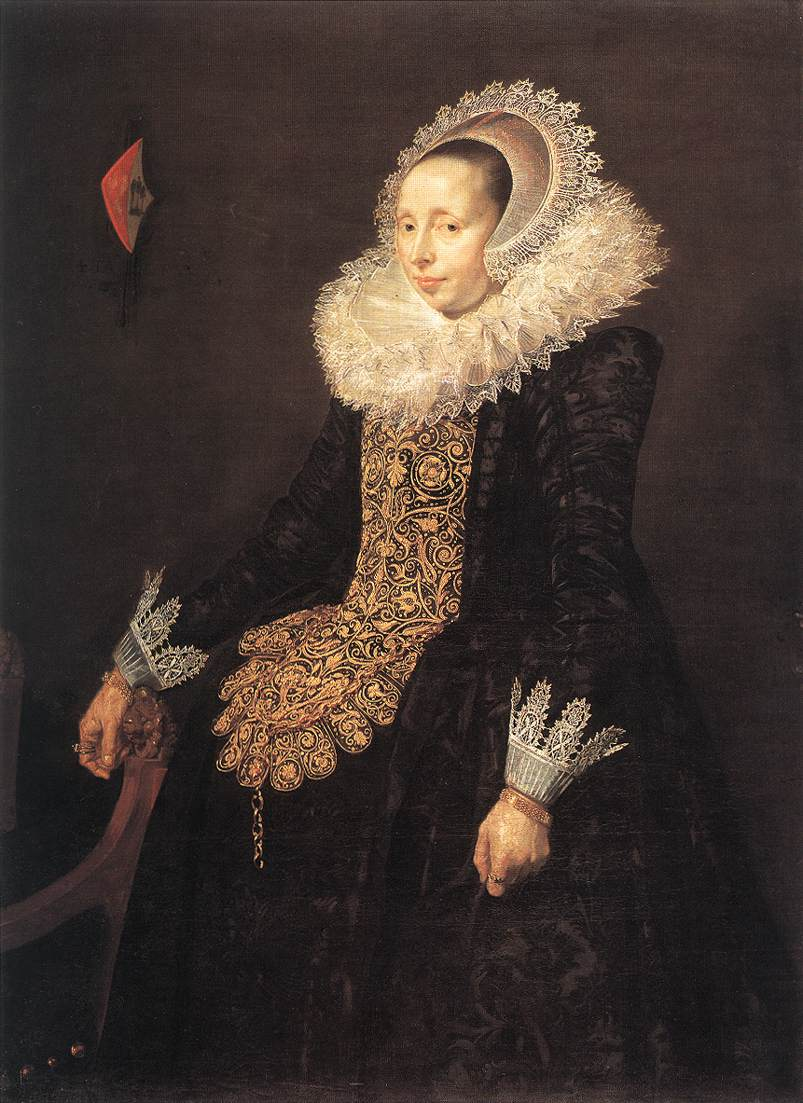
Catharina Both van der Eem holding the edge of her vlieger, 1629

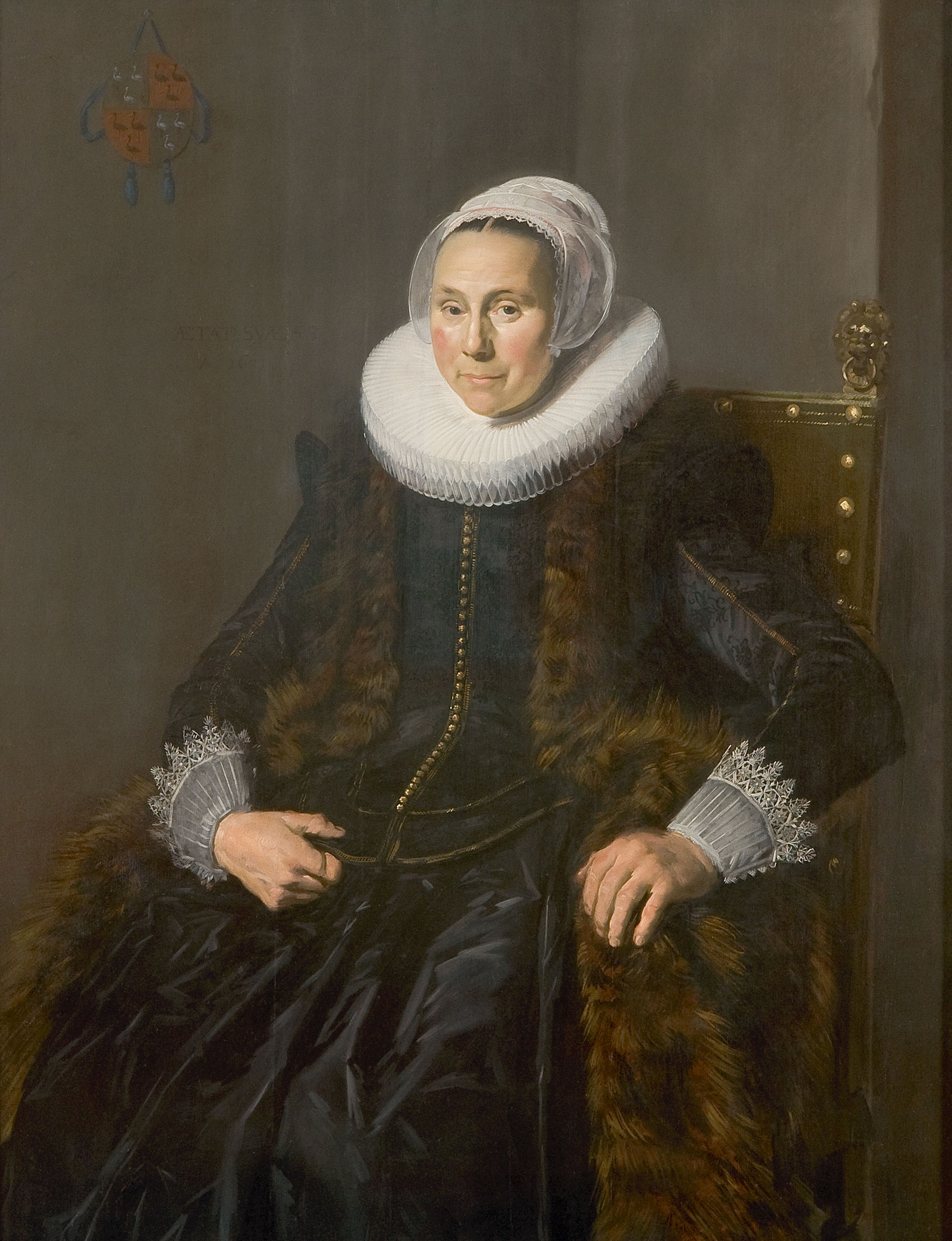
Cornelia Claesdr Vooght wearing a fur-lined vlieger, 1631

Catharina Behaghel wearing a vlieger with satin edge, 1635

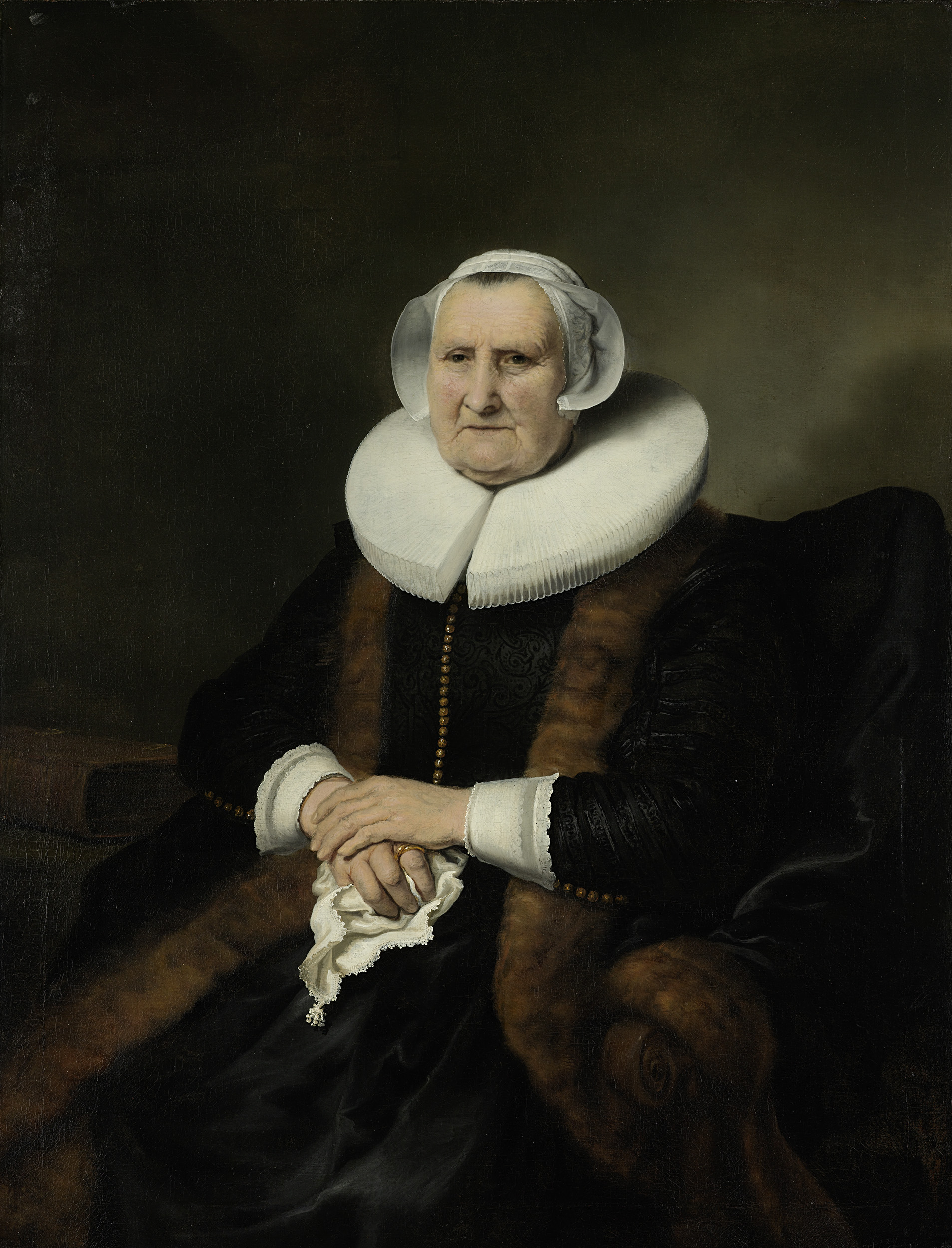
Elisabeth Bas wearing a fur-lined vlieger, 1630-1635

The Mennonite Aeltje Gerritsdr Schouten wearing a fur-lined vlieger in 1641

The Spanish version was called a "ropa" and could be closed at the neck. The French version was called a "marlotte".

Ropas:

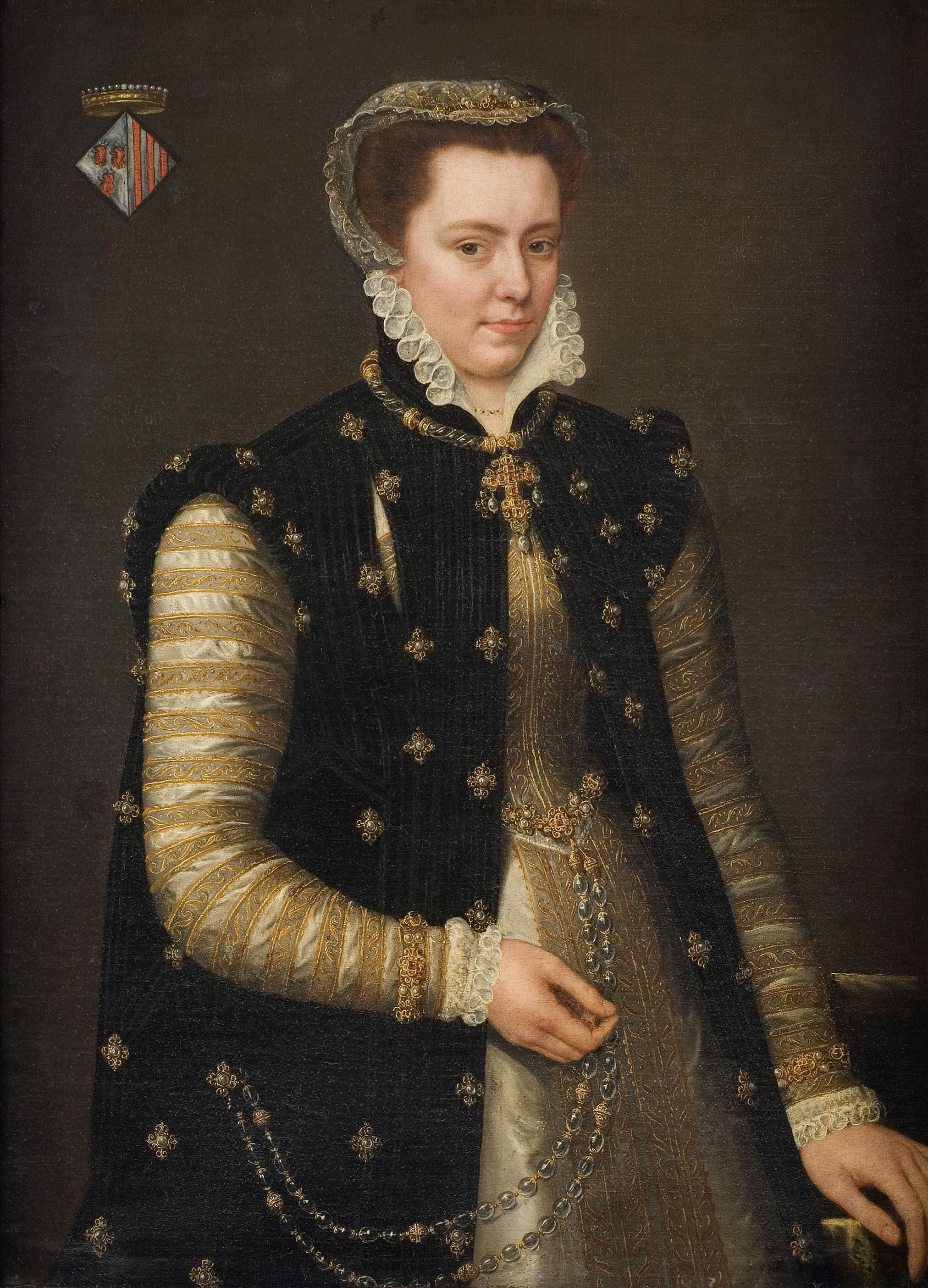
Margaret of Parma wearing a ropa, c 1559

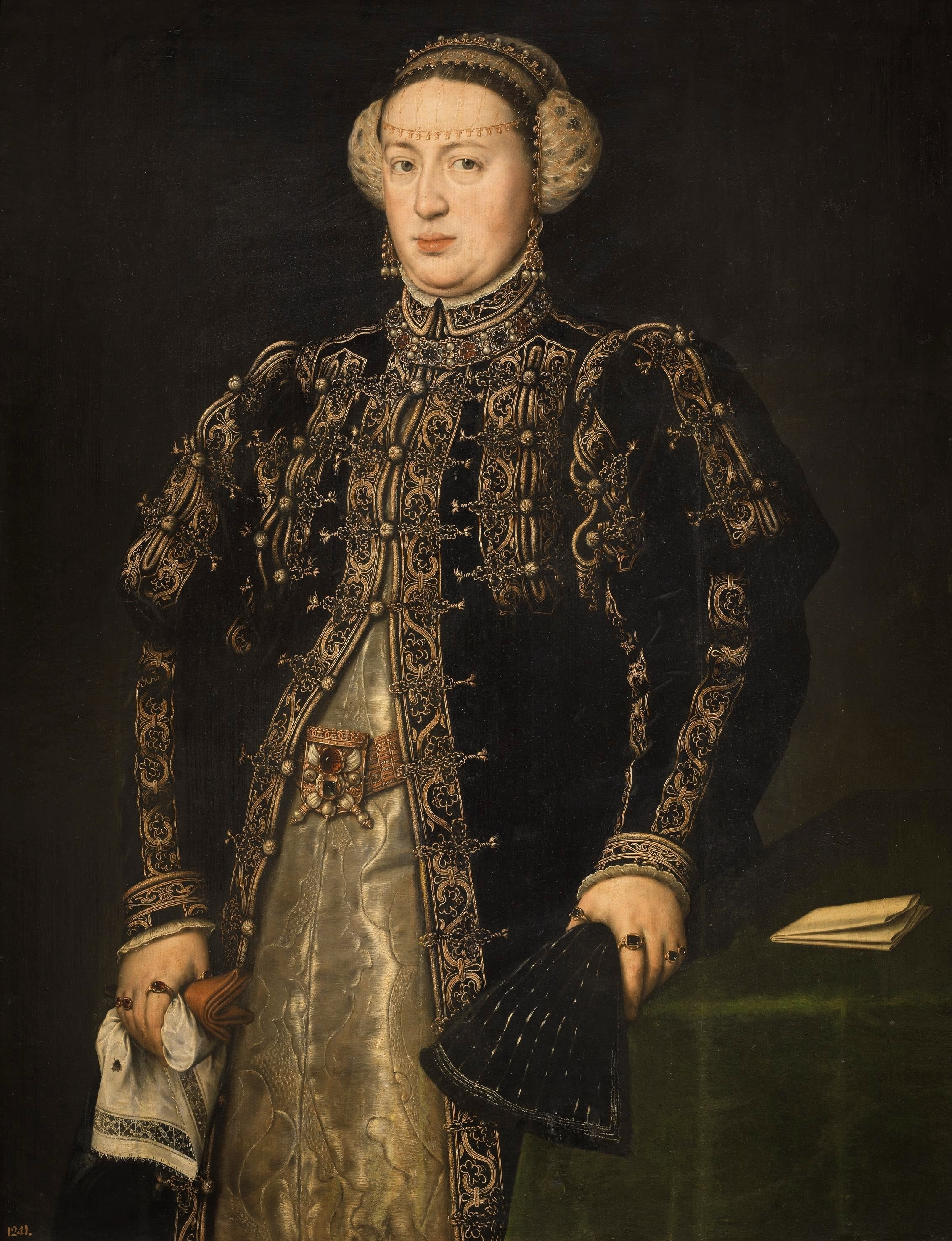
Infanta Caterina with ropa, c. 1552

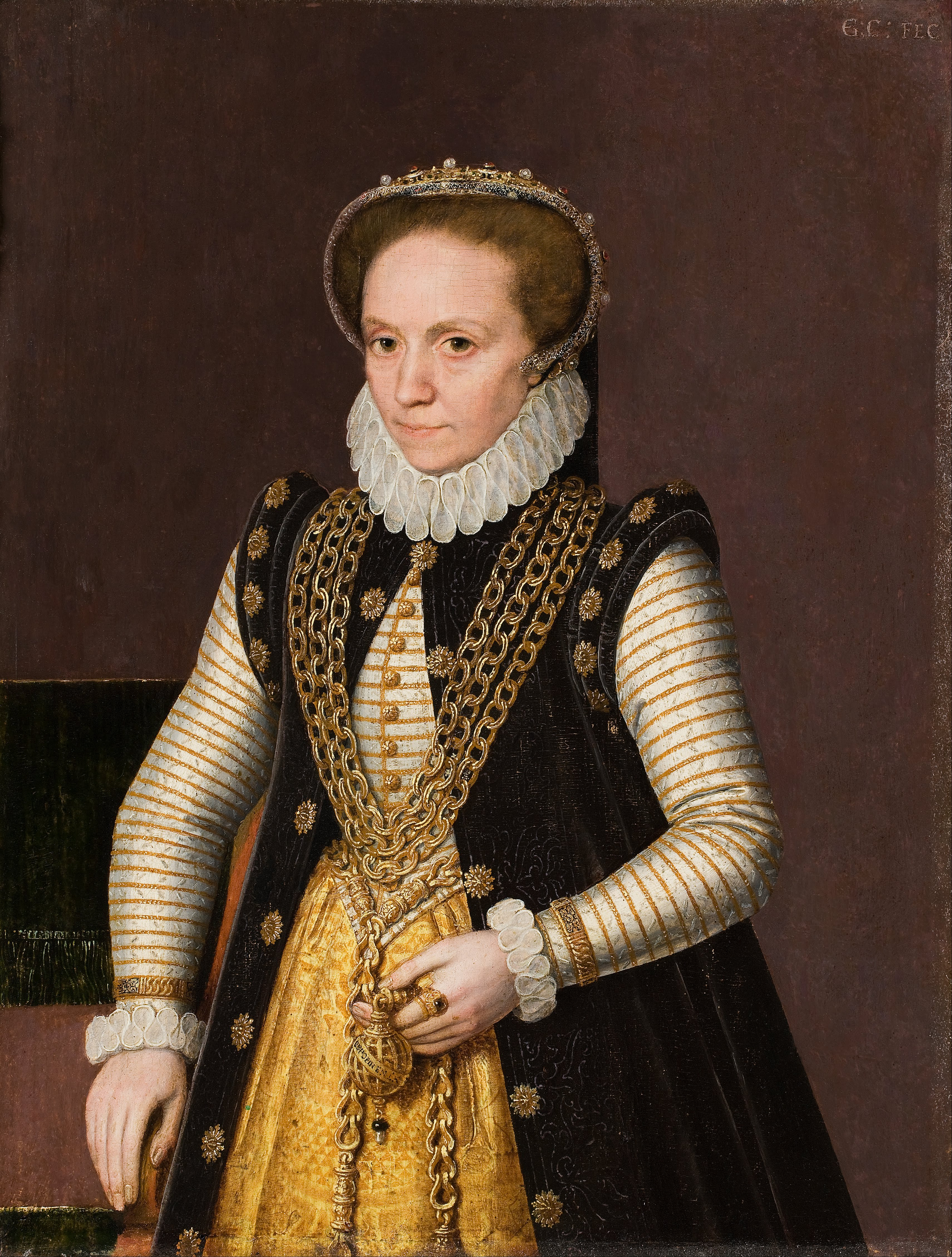
French Noblewoman with marlotte, 1560-9

The vlieger is often confused with the 'huik' (or huyck), which was a black wool cape covering the entire body made from a long swath of combed black wool gathered on one side around a visor or round cap that was perched on the head and could be attached to a diadem cap. These were worn for modesty and/or warmth when women were outside in public spaces. Paintings by Hendrick Avercamp and others often show both the vlieger and huik in use in winter scenes on the ice, and paintings by Bartholomeus van Bassen and others show these capes worn in churches.
