= Hendrik Gerritsz Pot =

Dutch painter

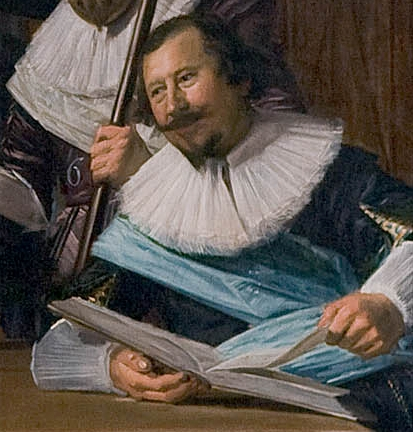
Portrait of Hendrik Gerritsz Pot by Frans Hals, detail of The Officers of the St Adrian Militia Company in 1633

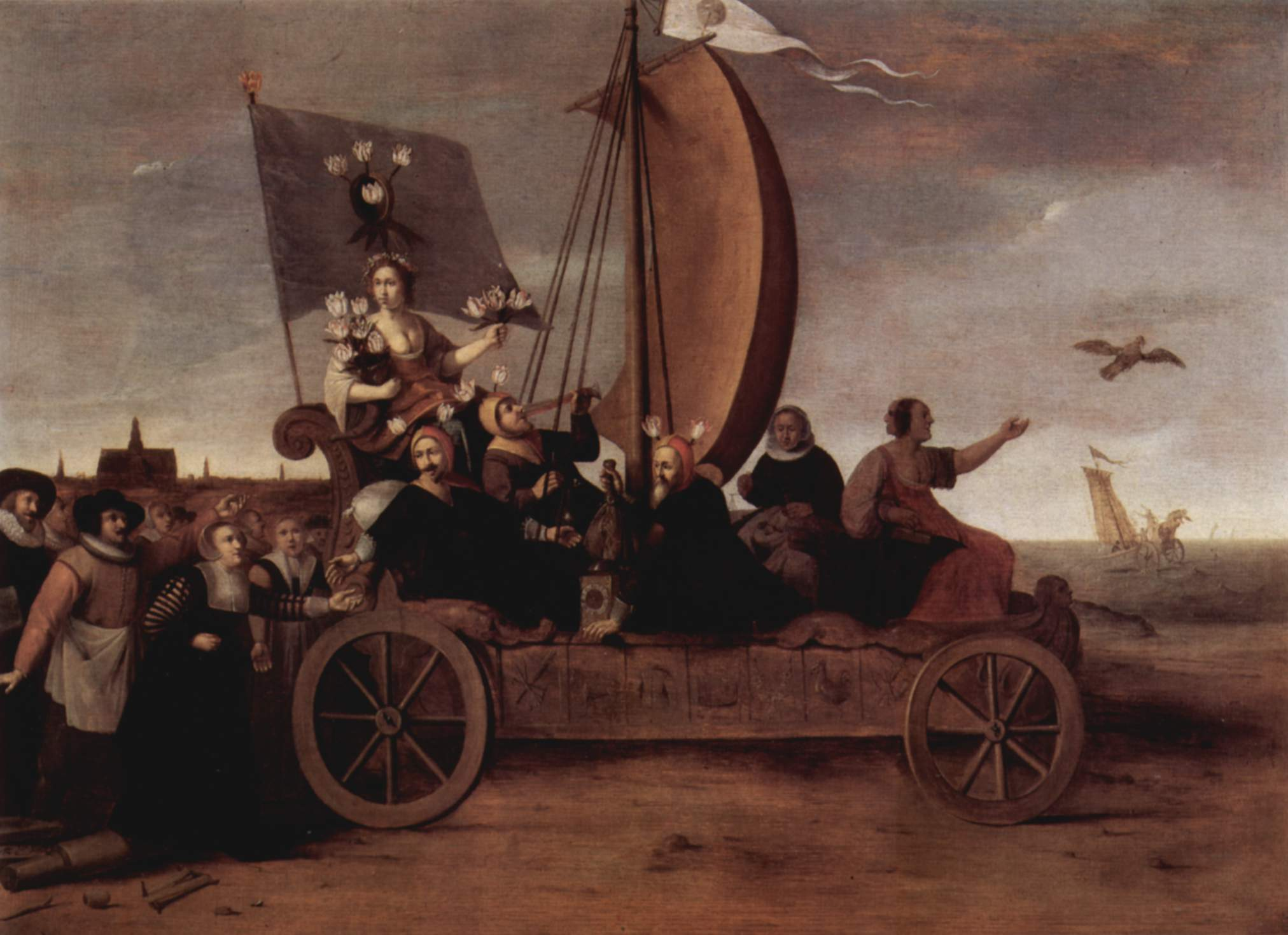
Flora's Wagon of Fools by Hendrik Pot (c. 1637)

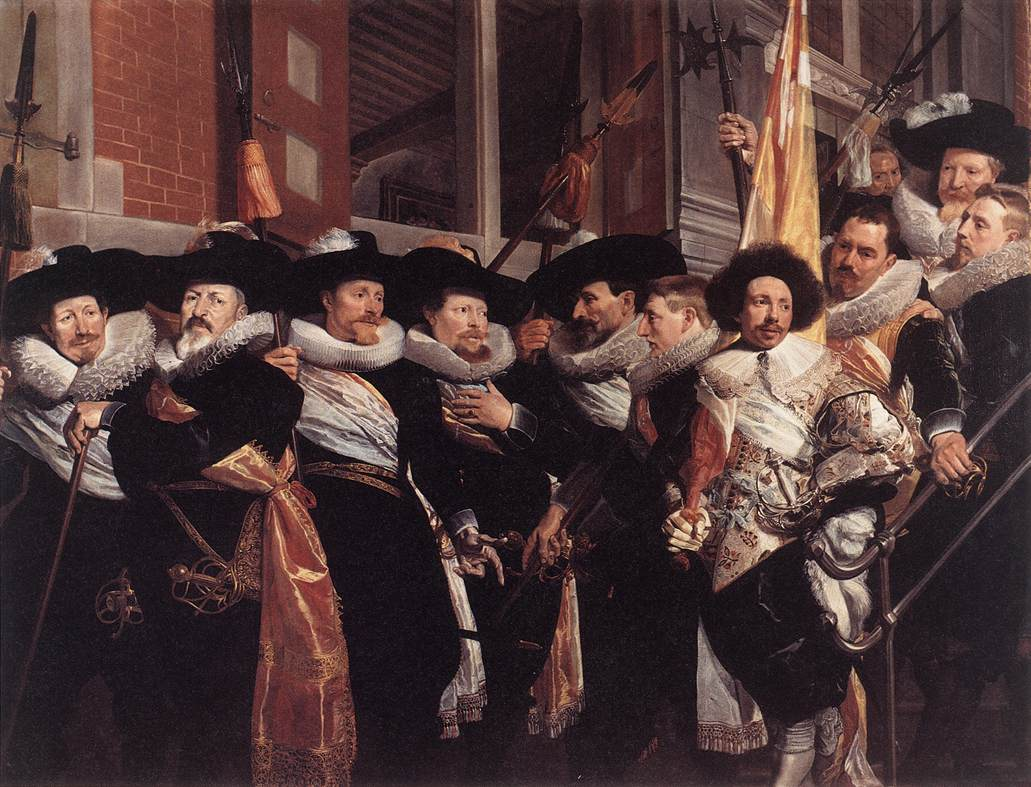
Officers of the Civic Guard of St Adrian

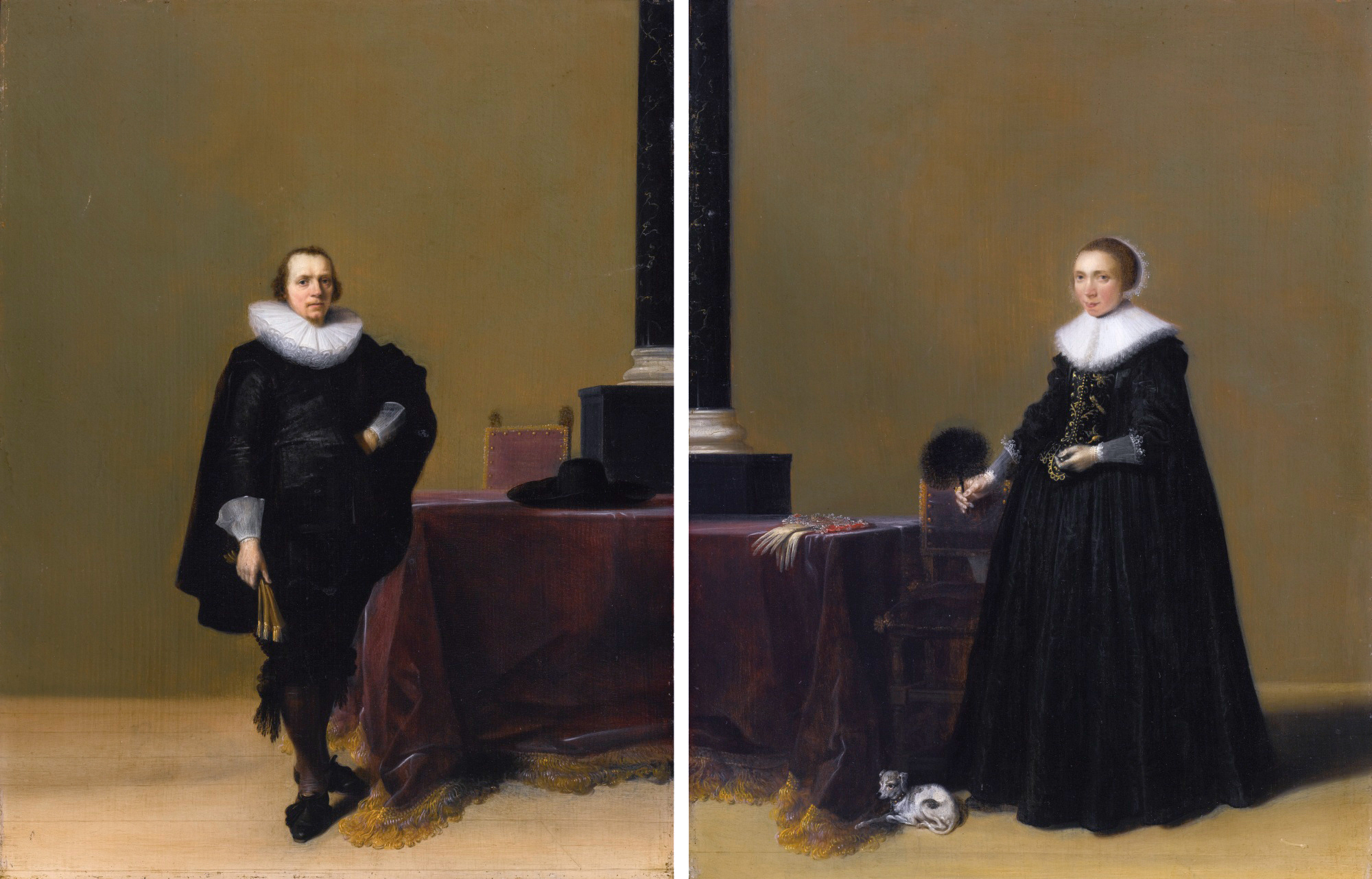
Jacob van de Merckt and his wife Petronella Witsen (ca. 1628)

Hendrik Gerritsz Pot (c. 1580 – 15 October 1657 (buried)) was a Dutch Golden Age painter, who lived and painted in Haarlem, where he was an officer of the militia, or schutterij. Dutch artist Frans Hals painted Pot in militia sash in Hals' The Officers of the St Adrian Militia Company in 1633. Pot is the man reading a book on the far right.

== Biography ==
Pot was born in Amsterdam and spent his early years in Amsterdam and Haarlem. In 1632 he traveled to London, where he painted the Royal Family. He lived from 1633 to 1648 in Haarlem, after which he moved to Amsterdam, where he died in 1657. He served as Dean of the Haarlem Guild of St. Luke in 1626, 1630 and 1635. He served as the Guild's headman or Hoofdman in 1634 and 1648. He died in Amsterdam.

== Works and style ==
Pot was probably a pupil of Karel van Mander, as was Hals, and they influenced each other. Pot’s paintings were sometimes allegorical in subject and he also painted group schutterstuk portraits, such as The Officers of the St Adrian Militia Company in 1630. He was also influenced by painter and engraver Willem Buytewech.

Pot was commissioned in London to paint portraits of King Charles I and Queen Henrietta Maria in 1632; the results now hang in the Royal Collection in London.

Pot’s type of genre scenes became known as "Merry Company" genre paintings. This included his 1635 piece, Portrait of a Young Woman, and a companion piece, now lost, as well as his 1630 piece, A Merry Company at Table. Both these paintings contain several objects considered sensual symbolism. A Merry Company at Table was set in a brothel, a popular theme in Dutch genre painting.

The latter piece also contains a common theme addressed in Pot’s works; beauty, age and death. This theme culminates in his well-known piece Allegory of Vanitas, usually referred to simply as Vanity, and which also contains motifs and symbols of sensual love. Other well-known Pot works are A Startling Introduction, The Coin Collector and Flora’s Wagon of Fools (shown), in which he poked fun at the fledgling tulip trade in Haarlem, where for a short while, the flower bulbs were sold by weight.

His more standard, though still stylish, portrait works include his Portrait of Sir Robert Phelips and his works of the King and Queen of England.

== Selected works ==
- 1630 – Officers of the Civic Guard of St Adrian (Frans Halsmuseum, Haarlem)
- 1630 – A Merry Company at Table (National Gallery, London)
- 1630 – Portrait of a Man (Rijksmuseum Amsterdam)
- 1632 – A Startling Introduction (Royal Collection, London)
- 1632 – Charles I, Henrietta Maria and the Prince of Wales (The Royal Collection, London)
- 1632 – Portrait of Sir Robert Phelips (National Portrait Gallery, London)
- 1633 – Allegory of Vanitas or Vanity (Frans Hals Museum, Haarlem)
- 1635–1640 – Woman Seated at a Table (Vanitas) (Museum of Fine Arts, Boston)
- 1635 – Portrait of a Young Woman (Liechtenstein Museum, Vienna)
- 1637 – Flora's Wagon of Fools (Frans Hals Museum, Haarlem)
- 1638 – Portrait of a Woman (Rijksmuseum Amsterdam)
- 1639 – Admiral Maarten Harpertz Tromp (Museum voor Schone Kunsten Gent, Antwerp)
- 1640 – The Miser (Uffizi Gallery, Florence)
- 1650 – The Painter in his Studio (Gemeente Musea, Delft)
- 1655 – The Coin Collector (Indianapolis Museum of Art, Indianapolis)
