= Frans Hals catalogue raisonné, 1989 =

The following is the list of 145 paintings indexed as autograph by Frans Hals, written by the art historian and Hals specialist Claus Grimm in 1989. The list is by catalogue number and is more or less in order of creation, starting from around 1610 when Hals began painting on his own. Most of these works are still considered autograph, though one has since been reattributed to Judith Leyster. In addition to this list, Grimm added comments and additional entries to Seymour Slive's lists of lost and doubtful paintings. He also rejected several Slive attributions, making his list is considerably shorter. The autograph catalogue entries are as follows:

Cat. no.	Image	Title	Year	Size	Inventory no.	Gallery	Location
1		Portrait of Jacobus Zaffius (fragment of original?)	1611	54.6 x 41.2 cm	OSI-511/486	Frans Hals Museum	Haarlem
2		Portrait of an unknown man	1612–1616	73.7 × 55.2 cm	32.821	Brooklyn Museum	New York City, NY
3		Portrait of Pieter Cornelisz van der Morsch	1616	88.1 x 69.5 cm	61.42.2	Carnegie Museum of Art	Pittsburgh, PA
4		The Banquet of the Officers of the St George Militia Company in 1616	1616	175 × 324 cm	OSI-109	Frans Hals Museum	Haarlem
5		Portrait of Catharina Hooft with her Nurse	1619–1620	86 x 65 cm	801G	Gemäldegalerie	Berlin
6		Portrait of an unknown man with a skull in his hand	c.1611	94 × 72.5 cm	38.6 (pendant to 267)	The Barber Institute of Fine Arts	Birmingham
7		Portrait of a Woman Standing	c.1611	94.2 × 71.1 cm	267 (pendant to 38.6)	Devonshire Collection	Chatsworth House
8		Portrait of an unknown woman (face later replaced and landscape background added)	c.1618	112 x 91 cm		private collection	Toronto, Canada
9		Portrait of an unknown man	1619	89 x 76 cm	1366	Musée des Beaux-Arts de Dijon	Dijon
10		Portrait of Paulus van Beresteyn	1620s	137.1 x 104 cm	R.F. 424 (pendant to R.F. 425)	Musée du Louvre	Paris
11		Portrait of the family Gijsbert Claesz van Campen (fragment; baby in lower left added by Salomon de Bray in 1628)	c. 1620	151 × 163.6 cm	left part of 4732	Toledo Museum of Art	Toledo, OH
12		Portrait of Three Children with a Goat Cart (fragment of Gijsbert Claesz van Campen family group)	c. 1620	152 x 107.5 cm	4732 (right fragment)	Koninklijke Musea voor Schone Kunsten of Belgium	Brussels
13		Sitting boy, possible fragment of the portrait of the family Gijsbert Claesz van Campen	1621–1622	52 x 45.7 cm		Private collection	Brussels
14		Portrait of a Man Standing (Kassel)	1618–1620	102.5 × 79 cm	213 (pendant to 214)	Museum Schloss Wilhelmshöhe	Kassel, DE
15		Portrait of a Woman Standing (Kassel)	1618–1620	103 × 82.5 cm	214 (pendant to 213)	Museum Schloss Wilhelmshöhe	Kassel, DE
16		(Possibly) portrait of Isaac Massa	1622	107 × 85 cm		Devonshire Collection	Chatsworth House
17		The Smoker, also known as "Three Heads"	1623–1625	46.7 x 49.5 cm	89.15.34	The Metropolitan Museum of Art	New York City, NY
18		Portrait of Tieleman Roosterman (the Laughing Cavalier)	1624	83 x 67 cm	84	The Wallace Collection	London
19		Laughing boy	c. 1625	30.45 cm diameter	1032	Mauritshuis	The Hague
20		Portrait of a Bearded Man with a Ruff	1625	76.2 x 63.5 cm	49734	The Metropolitan Museum of Art	New York City, NY
21		Portrait of Jacob Pietersz Olycan	1625	124.6 x 97.3 cm	459 (pendant to 460)	Mauritshuis	The Hague
22		Portrait of Aletta Hanemans (1606–1653)	1625	124.8 x 98.2 cm	460 (pendant to 459)	Mauritshuis	The Hague
23		Portrait of Willem van Heythuysen posing with a sword	1625–1630	204.5 x 134.5 cm	14101	Alte Pinakothek	Munich
24		The Lute Player (Hals)	c. 1623–1624	70 x 62 cm	R.F. 1984-32	Musée du Louvre	Paris
25		Portrait of a man with beard and ruff collar	c. 1630	68.5 × 56.5 cm		private collection	unknown
26		Marriage Portrait of Isaac Massa and Beatrix van der Laen	1622	140 x 166.5 cm	A 133	Rijksmuseum, Amsterdam	Amsterdam
27		The Banquet of the Officers of the St Adrian Militia Company in 1627	1627	183 × 266.5 cm	OSI-111 (1913)	Frans Hals Museum	Haarlem
28		Young woman (The Gypsy Girl - Malle Babbe)	c. 1625	57.8 x 52.1 cm	M.I. 926	Musée du Louvre	Paris
29		Portrait of Michiel de Wael	1625	121 x 95.8 cm	1931.45O	Taft Museum of Art	Cincinnati, OH
30		Portrait of Isaak Abrahamsz. Massa	1626	79.7 × 65.1 cm	54/31	The Art Gallery of Ontario	Toronto, Canada
31		Portrait of Michiel Jansz van Middelhoven (1562–1638)	1610–1626	87 x 70 cm		Collection Adolphe Schloss	unknown
32		Portret van Sara Andriesdr Hessix	1626	87 x 70 cm		Museu Calouste Gulbenkian	Lisbon
33		Boy with a Glass and a Lute	1625–1630	100 x 90 cm		Guildhall Art Gallery	London
34		Young Man with a Skull	c. 1626–28	92.2 x 80.8 cm	NG6458	National Gallery	London
35		Portrait of a Woman in a Chair	1627	87 x 67 cm	1954.287	The Art Institute of Chicago	Chicago, IL
36		The Banquet of the Officers of the St George Militia Company in 1627	1627	179 × 257.5 cm	OSI-110	Frans Hals Museum	Haarlem
37		Boy with flute	1623–1625	62 x 55 cm	801A	Gemäldegalerie	Berlin
38		Two singing boys with a lute and a music book	1620–1625	76 x 52 cm	GK 215	Museum Schloss Wilhelmshöhe	Kassel, DE
39		Portrait of a man with the jawbone of a cow in his hand (Pieter Verdonck)	c. 1627	46.7 x 35.6 cm	NG1200	National Gallery of Scotland	Edinburgh
40		Two laughing boys with mug of beer	1626–1627	68 x 56.5 cm	Br.L.4	Museum Boijmans Van Beuningen	Rotterdam
41		The evangelist Luke	1625	70 x 55 cm	181	Odessa Museum of Western and Eastern Art	Odessa
42		The evangelist Matthew	1625	70 x 55 cm	180	Odessa Museum of Western and Eastern Art	Odessa
43		The evangelist Mark	1625–1630	68 × 52 cm		Pushkin Museum	Moscow
44		Portrait of an unknown man	1625–1649	115.5 x 91.5 cm	1910.1.69	The Frick Collection	New York City, NY
45		Portrait of Lucas de Clercq (....-1652)	c. 1635	126.5 x 93 cm	SK-C-556 (pendant to SK-C-557)	Rijksmuseum	Amsterdam
46		Boy with a glass and a pewter jug	1625–1630	38 cm diameter	G2476	Staatliches Museum Schwerin	Schwerin
47		Laughing boy with a flute	1625–1630	37.3 cm diameter	G2475	Staatliches Museum Schwerin	Schwerin
48		Portrait of a seated young man with a broad brim hat	1626–1929	29.3 × 23.2 cm	1940.1.12	National Gallery of Art	Washington, D.C
49		Portrait of a man with a pleated collar	1634	68 x 58 cm		Museo Nacional de San Carlos	Mexico City
50		Portrait of Cunera van Baersdorp	1625	116.7 x 91.5 cm		Private collection	England
51		The Merry Drinker	1630	81 x 66.5 cm	SK A 135	Rijksmuseum	Amsterdam
52		Portrait of Cornelis Coning	1630	106.5 × 81 cm	1981.030.000	Allentown Art Museum	Allentown, Pennsylvania
53		Portrait of an unknown man with gloves	1630	116,8 x 90,2 cm	RCIN 405349	Royal Collection	London
54		Young woman (by Frans Hals) with a display of fruit and vegetables (by Claes van Heussen)	1630	157 x 200 cm		private collection	London
55		Portrait of an unknown man	1630–1633	75 × 58 cm	800 (pendant of 801)	Gemäldegalerie	Berlin
56		Portrait of Nicolaes Woutersz van der Meer	1631	128 x 100.5 cm	OSI-117 (pendant to OSI-118)	Frans Hals Museum	Haarlem
57		Portrait of Cornelia Claesdr Vooght	1631	126.5 x 101 cm	OSI-118 (pendant to OSI-117)	Frans Hals Museum	Haarlem
58		The 'Mulatto'	1628–1630	72 x 57.5 cm	1017	Museum der bildenden Künste	Leipzig
59		Laughing man with crock, known as 'Peeckelhaeringh'	c. 1628–1630	75 x 61.5 cm	216	Museum Schloss Wilhelmshöhe	Kassel, DE
60		The Officers of the St Adrian Militia Company in 1633	1633	207 x 337 cm	OSI-112	Frans Hals Museum	Haarlem
61		Portrait of Pieter van der Broecke	1633	71.2 x 61 cm	cat.51	Kenwood House	London
62		Portrait of an Elderly Lady	1633	102.5 × 86.9 cm	1937.1.67	National Gallery of Art	Washington, D.C
63		Portrait of a Man in his Thirties	1633	64.8 x 50.2 cm	cat.1251	National Gallery	London
64		Portrait of an old woman in ruff collar and diadem cap	c. 1633	40 x 37.5 cm		Private collection	unknown
65		Portrait of a man in a Yellowish-gray Jacket	c.1633	24.5 × 19.5 cm	1358	Gemäldegalerie Alte Meister	Dresden
66		Portrait of a man in a Black Jacket	c.1633	24.5 x 20 cm	1359	Gemäldegalerie Alte Meister	Dresden
67		Portrait of a man with hat	c. 1634	24.5 x 19.5 cm	618	Mauritshuis	The Hague
68		Portrait of an unknown man	1634	73 x 54 cm		Timken Museum of Art	San Diego, CA
69		Portrait of an unknown woman	1634	73.0 x 56.2 cm	23.27	Detroit Institute of Arts	Detroit, MI
70		The company of Captain Reinier Reael and Lieutenant Cornelis Michielsz. Blaeuw, known as the ‘Meagre Company’	1633–1637	209 x 429 cm	SK C 374	Rijksmuseum	Amsterdam
71		Portrait of an unknown man	1634	82.5 × 70 cm	4158	Szépmüvészeti Múzeum	Budapest
72		Portrait of a young woman aged 28	1634	112.2 x 83.2 cm	51.107	Baltimore Museum of Art	Baltimore, MD
73		Portrait of Nicolaes Hasselaer (1593–1635). Brewer, Captain-major of the Amsterdam civic guard	c. 1630–1633	79.5 × 66.5 cm	SK A 1246 (pendant to SK A 1247)	Rijksmuseum	Amsterdam
74		Portrait of Sara Wolphaerts van Diemen (1593–1667	c. 1630–1633	79.5 × 66.5 cm	SK-A-1247 (pendant to SK A 1246)	Rijksmuseum	Amsterdam
75		Portrait of an officer	1631	88 × 66 cm		Museo de Arte de São Paulo	São Paulo
76		Portrait of Tieleman Roosterman	1634	117 × 87 cm	1999.173	The Cleveland Museum of Art	Cleveland, OH
77		Portrait of Catharina Brugmans	1634	115 x 85 cm	(pendant to 1999.173)	private collection	The Hague
78		Portrait of an unknown woman	1630–1633	75 × 58 cm	801 (pendant of 800)	Gemäldegalerie	Berlin
79		Portrait of a man, incorrectly called Johannes Saeckma (1572–1636)	c.1635	121 x 90 cm	1276 (possible pendant of 72)	Museum Boijmans Van Beuningen	Rotterdam
80		Portrait of a woman, incorrectly called Hylck Boner	1635	116.5 x 93.3 cm	1910.1.72	The Frick Collection	New York City, NY
81		Portrait of Claes Duyst van Voorhout	c.1638	80.6 x 66 cm		The Metropolitan Museum of Art	New York City, NY
82		Portrait of (possibly) Maria Larp ( -1675)	1635–1638	83.4 x 68.1 cm	6413	National Gallery	London
83		Portrait of an unknown man	c.1638	78.9 x 63.5 cm		Kremer collection	unknown
84		Portrait of a Gentleman in White	1637	67.5 × 57 cm	L55.45	California Palace of the Legion of Honor	San Francisco, CA
85		Portrait of a man facing left	1637	67.5 x 57 cm		Staatsgalerie Stuttgart	Stuttgart
86		Portrait of a woman facing right and holding a fan	1637	67.5 x 57 cm		Stuttgart Staatsgalerie	Stuttgart
87		Portrait of a standing man holding a glove	1637	93 x 67 cm		private collection	unknown
88		Portrait of a standing woman holding a glove	1637	93 x 67 cm		private collection	unknown
89		Portrait of Jean de la Chambre	1638	20.6 x 16.8 cm	6411	National Gallery	London
90		Boy Pointing	c.1638	41.5 x 39 cm		private collection	London
91		Portrait of Aeltje Dircksdr. Pater (1597–1678)	1638	66.5 × 52.3 cm	1948.137	The Cleveland Museum of Art	Cleveland, OH
92		Portrait of Pieter Tjarck	1635–1638	85.25 x 69.09 cm	M.74.31	Los Angeles County Museum of Art	Los Angeles, CA
93		Portrait of an unknown 38-year-old man	1638	89 x 69.8 cm		Nationalmuseum	Stockholm
94		Portrait of an unknown 41-year-old woman	1638	89.1 x 70.2 cm		Nationalmuseum	Stockholm
95		Portrait of Captain Andries van Hoorn	1638	86 × 67 cm	185 P (pendant to 186 P)	São Paulo Museum of Art	São Paulo
96		Portrait of Maria Pietersdr Olycan	1638	86 × 67 cm	186 P (pendant to 185 P)	São Paulo Museum of Art	São Paulo
97		Portrait of an unknown man	1638	94.4 × 70.5 cm	77 (pendant of 78)	Städel Museum	Frankfurt am Main
98		Portrait of an unknown woman	1638	94.4 × 70.5 cm	78 (pendant of 77)	Städel Museum	Frankfurt am Main
99		portrait of a 52-year-old man with ruff collar holding a hat	1639	115 x 89.5 cm		private collection	unknown
100		Portrait of a Member of the Haarlem Civic Guard	1636–1638	86 × 69 cm	1937.1.68	National Gallery of Art	Washington, D.C
101		Portrait of Pieter Jacobsz Olycan	c. 1639	111.1 x 86.7 cm	sn251	The John and Mable Ringling Museum of Art	Sarasota, FL
102		Portrait of Maritge Claesdr. Voogt (1572–1644)	1639	128 x 94.5 cm	SK-C-139	Rijksmuseum	Amsterdam
103		Portrait of an unknown woman with folded hands	1644–1645	61.4 x 47 cm		National Gallery	London
104		Portrait of a sitting woman in a painted oval	1639	69.5 x 58 cm		stolen from Kunstmuseum Düsseldorf	unknown
105		The Officers of the St George Militia Company in 1639	1639	218 × 421 cm	OSI-113	Frans Hals Museum	Haarlem
106		Portrait of a man, possibly Johan de Wael (1594–1663)	1638	69.7 x 54 cm	(pendant of 1948.137)	Private collection	Germany
107		Portrait of an unknown man, possibly Albert van Nierop	c.1640	120 x 95 cm	WRM 2529 (pendant of WRM 2530)	Wallraf-Richartz-Museum	Cologne
108		Portrait of an unknown woman, possibly Cornelia van der Meer	c.1640	120 x 94.5 cm	WRM 2530 (pendant of WRM 2529)	Wallraf-Richartz-Museum	Cologne
109		Portrait of a man facing right	1640–1642	29.5 x 23.5 cm		Staatliche Kunstsammlungen	Kassel, DE
110		Portrait of a man facing left	1640–1642	30.5 x 24.5 cm		Staatliche Kunstsammlungen	Kassel, DE
111		Drinking woman (Malle Babbe) with an owl on her shoulder	1630–1635	75 x 64 cm	801C	Gemäldegalerie	Berlin
112		Regenten of the Grote of St. Elisabeth Gasthuis, Haarlem 1641	1641	153 x 252 cm	OSI-114	Frans Hals Museum	Haarlem
113		Portrait of Mr. Bodolphe	1643	122.4 × 97.5 cm	1961.18.23 (pendant to 1961.18.24)	Yale University Art Gallery	New Haven, CT
114		Portrait of Mrs. Bodolphe	1643	122.4 × 97.5 cm	1961.18.24 (pendant to 1961.18.23)	Yale University Art Gallery	New Haven, CT
115		Portrait of an elderly man facing right with hat and ruff collar	1643	92.7 x 75 cm		private collection	unknown
116		Portrait of a man	1640–1642	79.2 x 65.3 cm		Kiel, Schloss Museum	Kiel
117		Portrait of an unknown woman	1640–1642	78 x 65 cm		Coburg, Veste Coburg	Coburg, DE
118		Portrait of Paulus Verschueren (1606–1667)	1643	118.7 × 94 cm	26.101.11	The Metropolitan Museum of Art	New York City, NY
119		Fragment of a male portrait	1643–1644	39 x 31.5 cm		private collection	unknown
120		Portrait of Joseph Coymans	1644	33 x 27 1/2 in	(pendant to 1938.231)	Wadsworth Atheneum	Hartford, CT
121		Portrait of Dorothea Berck	1644	83.8 × 69.6 cm	1938.231	Baltimore Museum of Art	Baltimore, MD
122		Portrait of an artist (possibly Harmen Hals)	1644	82.6 x 64.8 cm	94.1023	The Art Institute of Chicago	Chicago, IL
123		Portrait of a man, possibly Adriaen Jansz. van Ostade (1610–1685)	1645–1648	94 × 75 cm	1937-1-70	National Gallery of Art	Washington, D.C
124		Portrait of a standing man holding a glove	1644–1645	88 x 65 cm		private collection	unknown
125		Portrait of a young man with folded arms	1644	79.5 x 58.4 cm		private collection; on loan to FHM	Haarlem
126		Portrait of Jasper Schade van Westrum	1645	80 × 67.5 cm	O638	National Gallery in Prague	Prague
127		Portrait of Willem Coymans, a.k.a. Balthasar Coymans	1645	77 × 64 cm	1937.1.69	National Gallery of Art	Washington, D.C
128		Portrait of Johannes Hoornbeeck	1645	80 x 68 cm	2245	Koninklijke Musea voor Schone Kunsten of Belgium	Brussels
129		Portrait of a man leaning over the back of a chair with a black hat	1646–1648	68 x 56 cm	1937.1.71	National Gallery of Art	Washington, D.C
130		Portrait of Stephanus Geeraerdts ( -1671)	1648–1650	115.4 × 87.5 cm	674	Royal Museum of Fine Arts, Antwerp	Antwerp
131		Portrait of Isabella Coymans ( -1689)	1648–1650	116 × 86 cm	(pendant to 674)	Private collection	unknown
132		Portrait of an unknown man	1648–1650	63.5 x 53.5 cm	1942.9.28	National Gallery of Art	Washington, D.C
133		Portrait of a man facing forward	1650–1652	65 x 56.5 cm		Private collection	unknown
134		Portrait of a man with long hair and a mustache	1650–1652	84.7 x 67 cm	816	Hermitage Museum	St. Petersburg (Russia)
135		Portrait of an unknown man	1650–1652	115 x 84.5 cm	1942.9.29	National Gallery of Art	Washington, D.C
136		Portrait of an unknown man	1650–1652	110.5 x 86.3 cm	91.26.9	The Metropolitan Museum of Art	New York City, NY
137		Portrait of Tyman Oosdorp	c. 1656	89 x 70 cm	801H	Gemäldegalerie	Berlin
138		Portrait of a man, possibly a minister	1660	37 x 29.8 cm	SK A 2859	Rijksmuseum	Amsterdam
139		Portrait of an unknown man	1658–1660	35.5 x 29.5 cm		Yale University Art Gallery	New Haven, CT
140		Portrait of a man	c. 1660	31.6 x 25.5 cm	928	Mauritshuis	The Hague
141		Portrait of an unknown man	after 1650	113 × 81.9 cm	1917.1.70	The Frick Collection	New York City, NY
142		Portrait of Willem Croes (d.1666)	1662–1666	47.1 × 34.4 cm	8402	Alte Pinakothek	Munich
143		Group portrait of the Regents of the Old Men's Almshouse	1664	172.5 x 256 cm	OSI-115	Frans Hals Museum	Haarlem
144		Portrait of a man with a tassle collar	1660–1666	70 x 58.5 cm		Kunsthaus Zurich	Zurich
145		Portrait of Isaac Massa with a large floppy hat	1661–1663	79.5 × 66.5 cm	219	Museum Schloss Wilhelmshöhe	Kassel, DE

== See also ==
- Frans Hals catalogue raisonné, 1974 – earlier catalogue by Seymour Slive with 222 autograph paintings
- Marriage pendant portraits by Frans Hals – a list showing the marriage pendants side-by-side
- List of paintings by Frans Hals – updated (but still incomplete) list

== Sources ==
- Frans Hals, by Seymour Slive, a catalogue raisonné of Hals works by Seymour Slive: Volume Three, the catalogue, National Gallery of Art: Kress Foundation, Studies in the History of European Art, London: Phaidon Press, 1974
- Frans Hals, by Seymour Slive (editor), with contributions by Pieter Biesboer, Martin Bijl, Karin Groen and Ella Hendriks, Michael Hoyle, Frances S. Jowell, Koos Levy-van Halm and Liesbeth Abraham, Bianca M. Du Mortier, Irene van Thiel-Stroman, Prestel-Verlag, Munich & Mercatorfonds, Antwerp, 1989, ISBN 3791310321
- Frans Hals: het gehele oeuvre, by Claus Grimm, Amsterdam, Meulenhoff/Landshoff, 1990
- Frans Hals in the RKD
