= Maria Pietersdr Olycan =

Painting by Frans Hals

Portrait of Maria Pietersdr Olycan
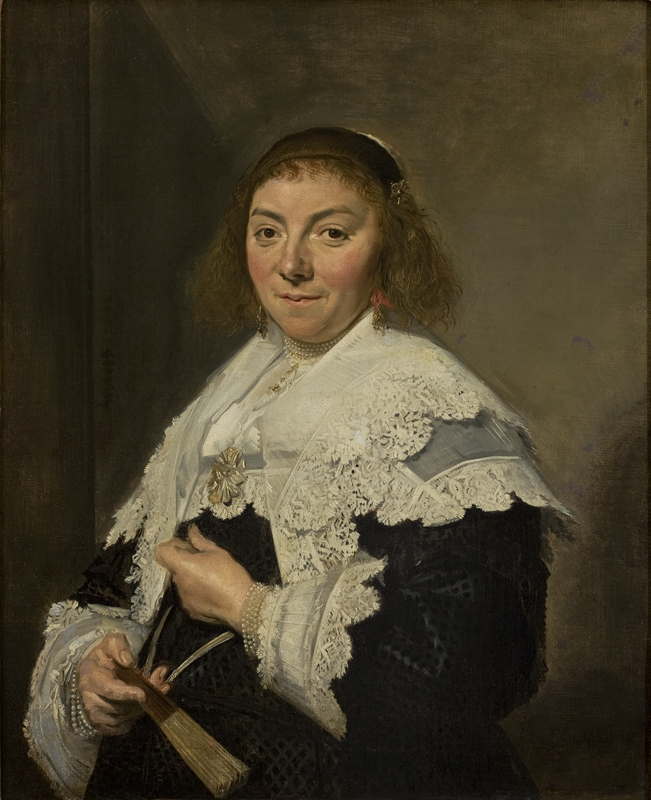
- Artist: Frans Hals
- Year: c. 1638
- Medium: oil paint, canvas
- Dimensions: 86 cm (34 in) × 67 cm (26 in) × 2 cm (0.79 in)
- Location: Brazil

Portrait of Maria Pietersdochter Olycan is an oil-on-canvas painting by the Dutch Golden Age painter Frans Hals, painted in 1638, now in the São Paulo Museum of Art. It is considered a pendant to the portrait of Maria's husband Andries van Hoorn.

== Life ==
Maria Pietersdr Olycan was born in Haarlem in 1607 as the daughter of the wealthy brewers Pieter Jacobsz Olycan and Maritge Claesdr. Voogt. She was the younger sister of the brewer Jacob Pietersz Olycan. Maria's older sister Dorothea married Cornelis van Loo, the son of another brewer, Claes van Loo. Her brother Nicolaes van Olycan married Agatha Dicx, the daughter of the brewer and mayor, Dirk Dicx. Maria's younger sister Hester married the brewer Tyman Oosdorp.

On 25 July 1638 Maria married the widower Andries van Hoorn, also a brewer. He had a daughter Christine by his first marriage and a brewery of his own. His sister Agatha had married the brewer Cornelis Guldewagen. Andries and Maria had a daughter of their own, also called Maria, in 1639, but Maria Pietersdr Olycan died only five years later in 1655. Andries survived his second wife by 22 years and lived to see his daughter Christine's wedding in 1657 to Adriaan Noirot, and his daughter Maria's wedding in 1662 to the diplomat jhr. mr. Cornelis Ascanius van Sypesteyn. He also lived to see the Sypesteyn house be searched by a mob in 1672 on suspicion of hiding Johan de Witt, and though nothing was found, C.A. van Sypesteyn continued to be mistrusted and was stabbed to death in 1673 in Gorinchem. Maria van Hoorn outlived both her parents and her husband and died in 1704.

== Painting ==
Maria's dress reflects the height of fashion in 1638. The millstone collar has made way for layers of intricate lace that edge see-through linen collars that come together with a brooch in a manner that suggests a decolleté. She is holding a fan and wears matching pearl bracelets and a pearl necklace. Her hair is wrapped around a diadem that is studded with gold dangles. This portrait was documented by Hofstede de Groot in 1910, before the sitter was identified. He wrote "384. PORTRAIT OF A WOMAN. M. 206. Half-length. She is turned slightly to the left, and looks at the spectator. Her left hand is at her breast; her right hand holds her fan. She wears a black dress trimmed with lace, a close-fitting cap, a white lace collar and wristbands, and a pearl necklace. Grey background. Painted about the years 1635-40. Canvas, 31 1/2 inches by 25 1/2 inches. Exhibited in the Royal Academy Winter Exhibition, London, 1903, No. 45. Exhibited at the Hudson-Fulton Celebration, Metropolitan Museum, New York, 1909, No. 31. Purchased in the Isle of Wight, 1896, from the grandson of George IV.'s cook, who had formerly owned it, by the London dealers Dowdeswell. In the possession, successively, of the London dealer C. Wertheimer; of the Paris dealer C. Sedelmeyer; and the London dealers T. Agnew and Sons. In the collection of J. Pierpont Morgan, London."

Of this portrait's pendant, Hofstede de Groot noted that it did not resemble the wedding portrait of Michiel de Wael that he included as #242. Of this portrait of an as yet unidentified man, he wrote:

282. PORTRAIT OF A MAN SEATED. M. 135. Half-length. He faces right, and leans his left hand on a stick. He has a moustache and slight imperial. He wears a large black felt hat, a black costume, a white ruff, and yellowish-grey gloves. Doubtfully identified as a portrait of Michiel de Wael. [Compare 242.] Inscribed, "AETAT SVAE 32 AN 1638" (the last numeral is not clear); canvas, 34 inches by 26 1/2 inches. Exhibited at the Hudson-Fulton Celebration, Metropolitan Museum, New York, 1909, No. 30. Bought in Paris by an elder Seymour (for .40). Sale. Arthur Seymour, London, April I, 1897, No. 113 (T. Agnew and Sons). In the collection of J. Pierpont Morgan, London.

In 1974 Seymour Slive tried to trace the remark about the king's cook but there is no reference in the Royal Archives of such a statement. He remarked on Andries' portrait bearing an inscription and coat of arms while Maria's portrait lacks this, but notes that coats of arms were generally added by later descendants.

== Wedding pendant ==
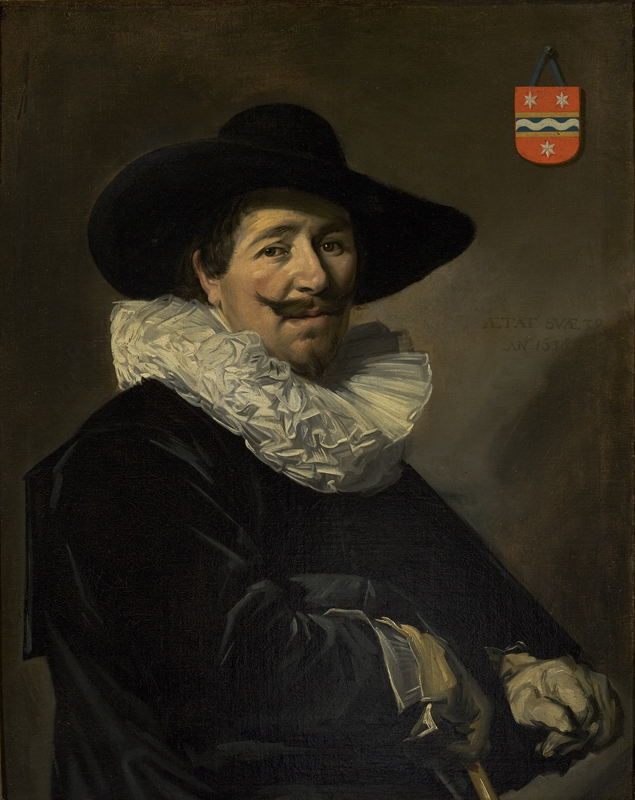

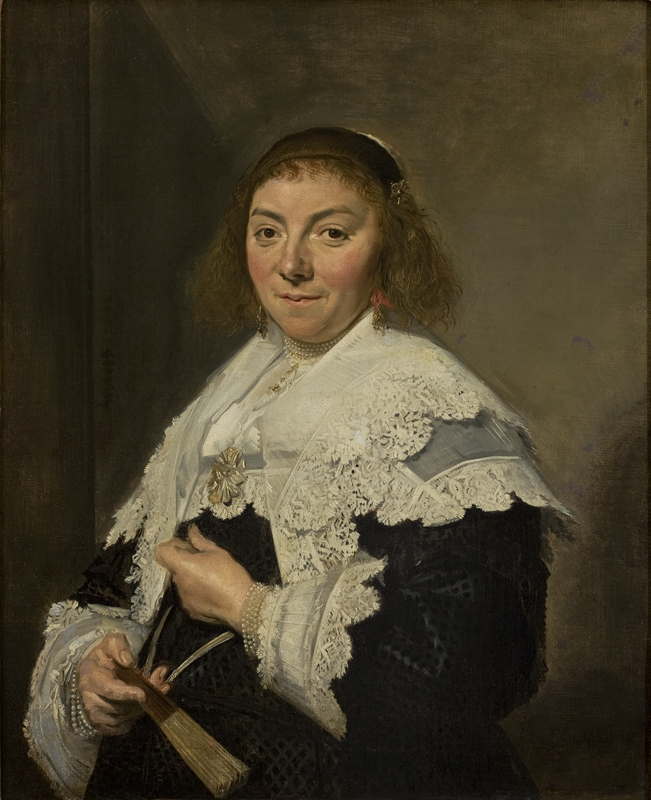

== See also ==
- List of paintings by Frans Hals
