= Willem Claesz Vooght =

Mayor of Haarlem

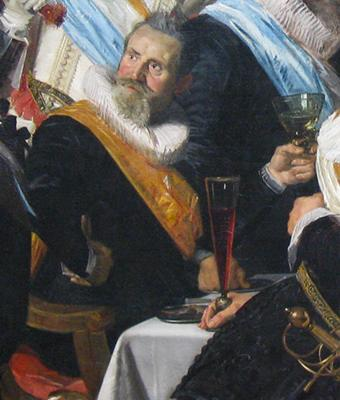
Willem Claesz Vooght as colonel of the schutterij in 1627. Frans Hals only signed one of his now famous schutterstukken, and his signature monogram is on the arm of the chair Willem is sitting in.

Willem Claesz Vooght (1572–1630), was a mayor of Haarlem best known today for the portrait painted of him by the painter Frans Hals.

== Biography ==
He was the son of Claes Aelbertsz Vooght and the brother of Maritge Claesdr Voogt (1577–1644) who married the brewer Pieter Jacobsz Olycan, and Cornelia who married the brewer Nicolaes Woutersz van der Meer. He was himself the brewer at the family Vooght brewery.

Frans Hals painted him at the head of the table in his The Banquet of the Officers of the St Adrian Militia Company in 1627. His descendant, the art historian Roeland van Eynden, made a copy of this portrait in 1786 with a memorial plaque in the background that stated that he was mayor and colonel of the Haarlem schutterij, died in 1630, and the portrait was copied from the famous schutterstuk by Frans Hals in the Doelen, Haarlem.

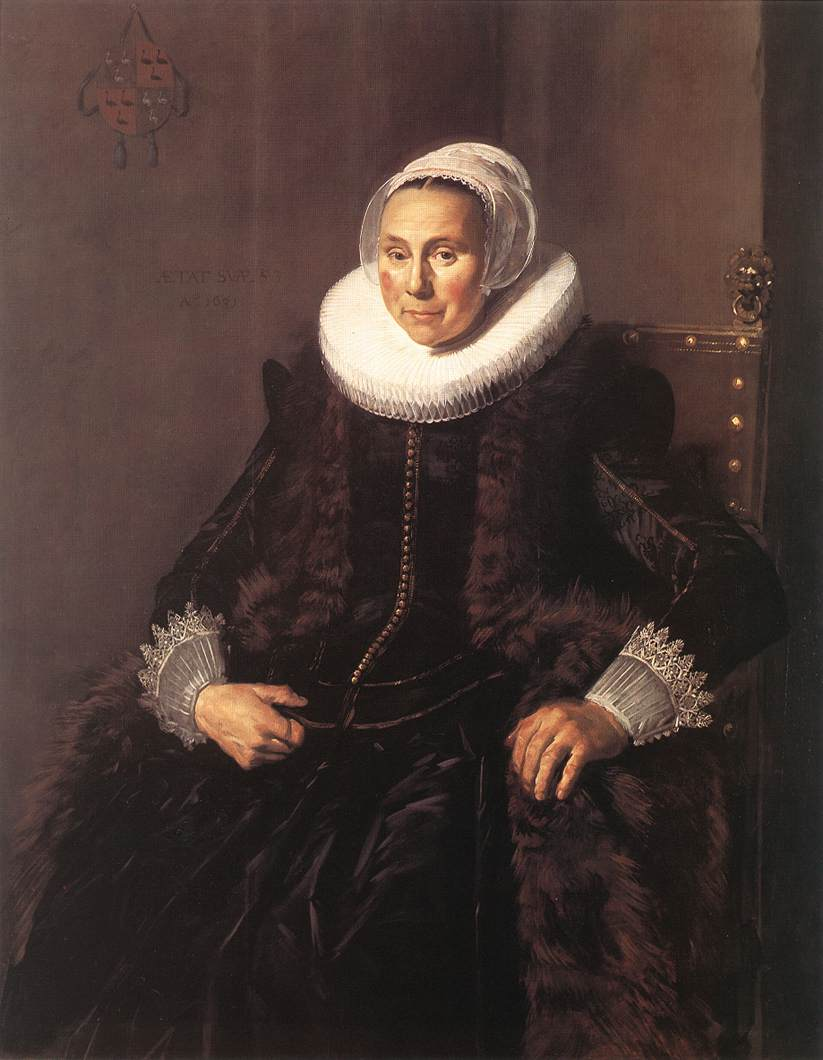
Cornelia Claesdr Voogt, wife of Nicolaes van der Meer

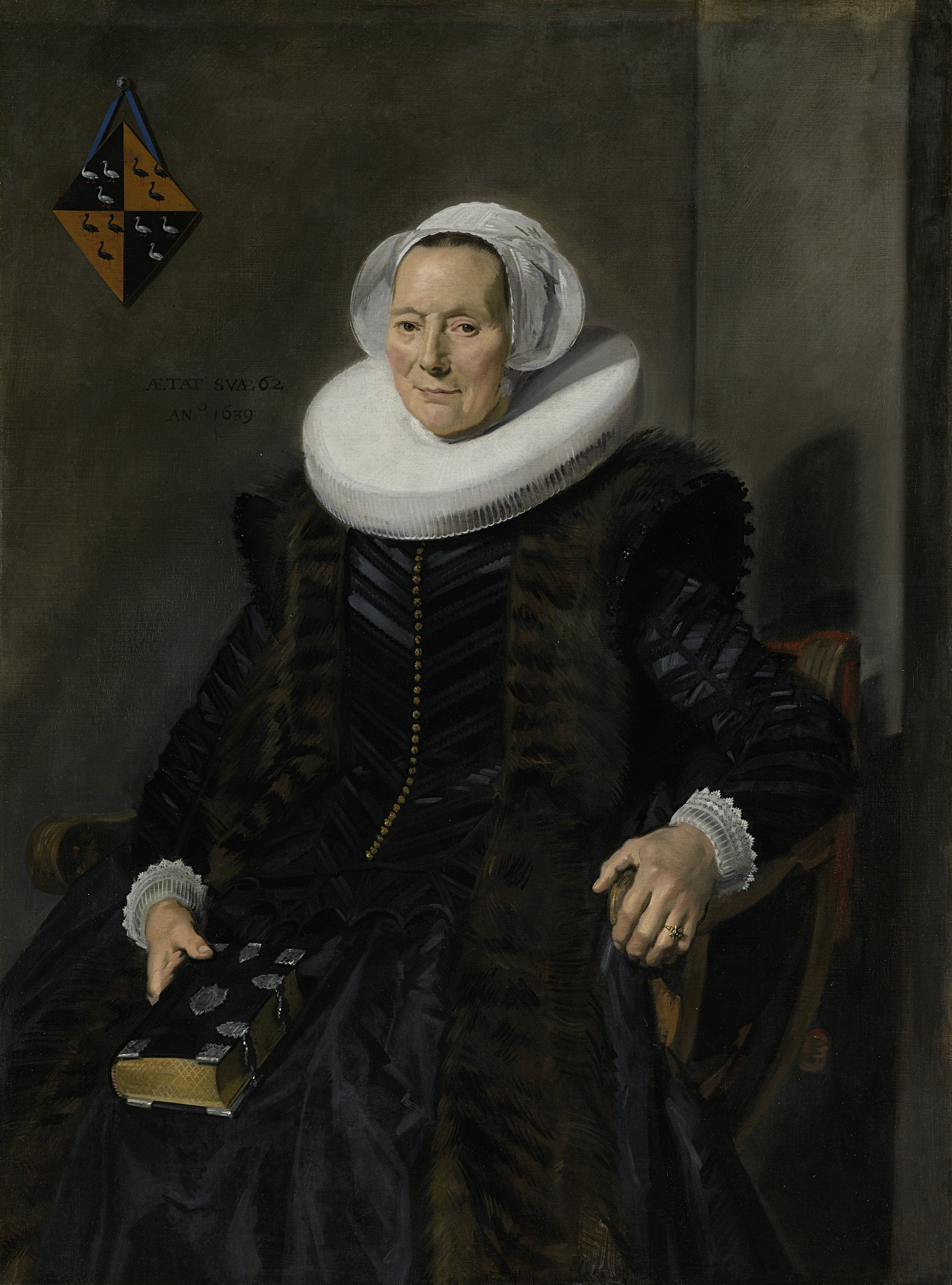
Maritge Claesdr Voogt, wife of Pieter Olycan
