= Cornelia Claesdr Voogt =

Painting by Frans Hals

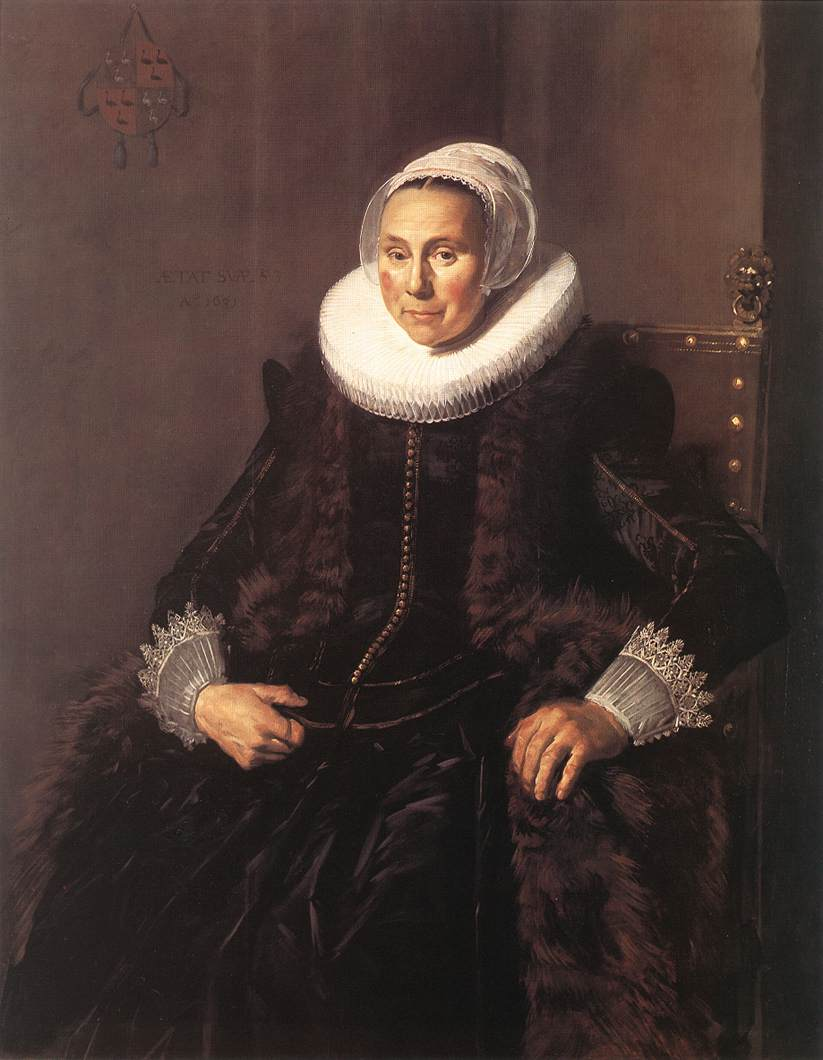
- Portrait of Cornelia Claesdr. Vooght, 1631, oil on panel, 126.5 x 101 cm
- Artist: Frans Hals
- Year: 1631
- Catalogue: Hofstede de Groot, Catalog 1910: #201
- Medium: Oil on panel
- Dimensions: 126.5 cm × 101 cm (49.8 in × 40 in)
- Location: Frans Hals Museum; Haarlem

Portrait of Cornelia Claesdr. Vooght is a painting by the Dutch Golden Age painter Frans Hals, painted in 1631 and now in the Frans Hals Museum. The painting is an oil on panel and is considered a pendant portrait to that of her husband, the Haarlem brewer and mayor Nicolaes Woutersz van der Meer.

== Painting ==
This painting was documented by Hofstede de Groot in 1910, who wrote:

201. CORNELIA CLAESDR. VOOGT (born 1578), wife of Nicolaes van der Meer. M. 54. Three-quarter-length. She sits in a large arm-chair, seen almost in full face, but slightly inclined to the left. She looks at the spectator. Her left hand rests on the arm of the chair, her right hand on her lap. She wears a cap, a black dress with a fur cape, a ruff, and lace wristbands. In the left-hand top corner hangs her coat-of-arms. [Pendant to 200.] Inscribed below the coat-of-arms, "AETAT SVAE 53 (and under this) ANo 1631"; panel, 51 inches by 40 inches. In the collection of Fabricius van Leyenburg. In the Haarlem Municipal Museum, bequeathed by Fabricius van Leyenburg in 1883; 1907 catalogue, No. 125.

In 1974 Seymour Slive listed this painting as Hals' first example of a portrait at three-quarter length of a woman sitting in a chair. At that time both this painting and its pendant were considered completely original, so Slive then assumed that the Hals portrait of Cornelia's sister Maritge was influenced by this one because the sitters were sisters. Today both this painting and its pendant are considered original Hals portraits, but x-ray photographs show different faces under the faces we see today, leading to the possibility that these portraits once belonged to other sitters.

== Pendants ==
Husband and wife

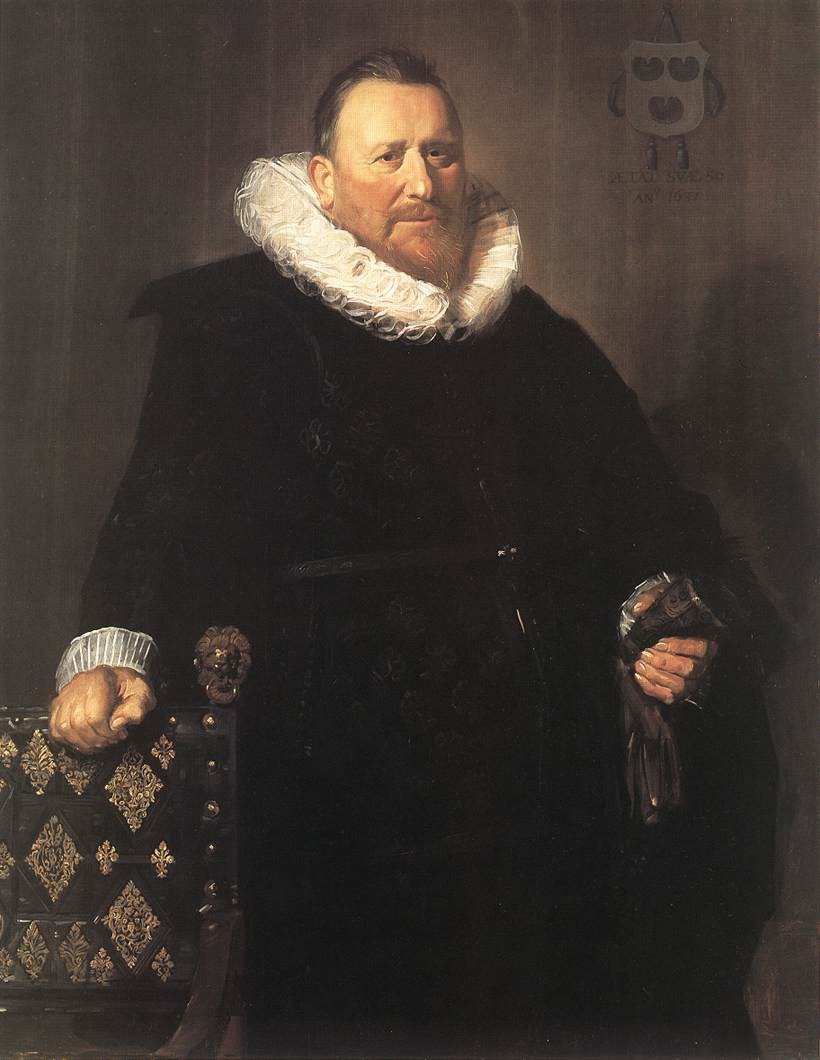

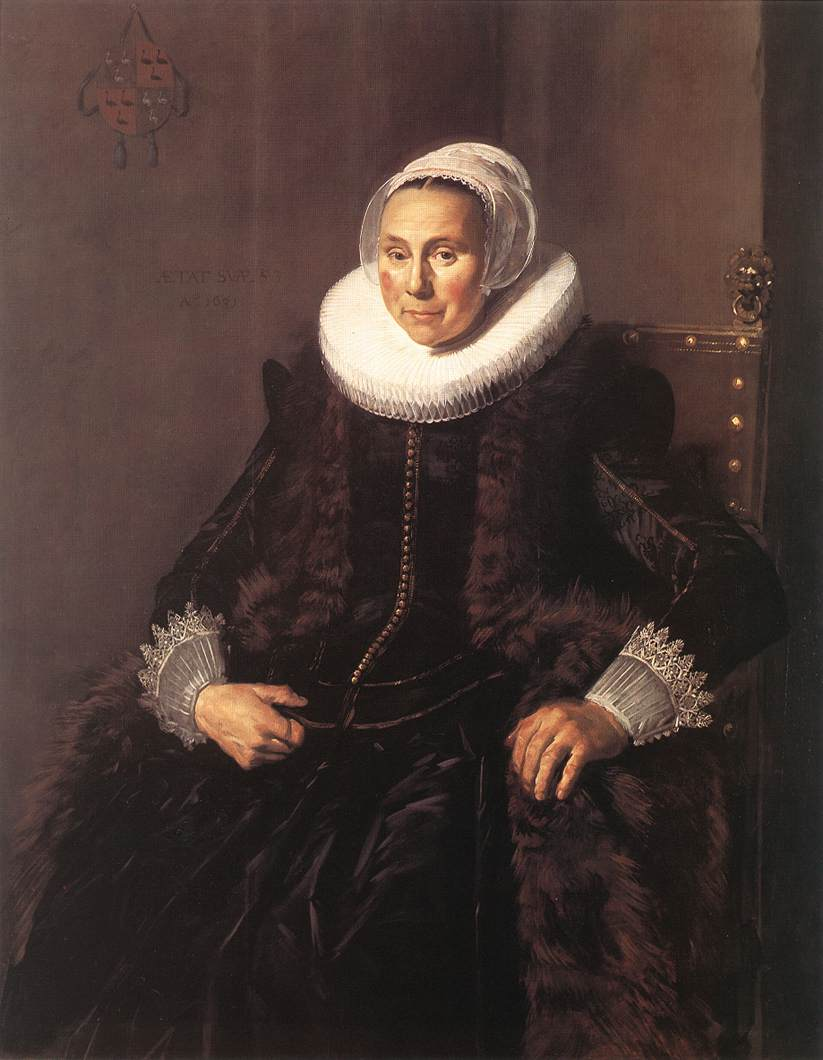

Sisters

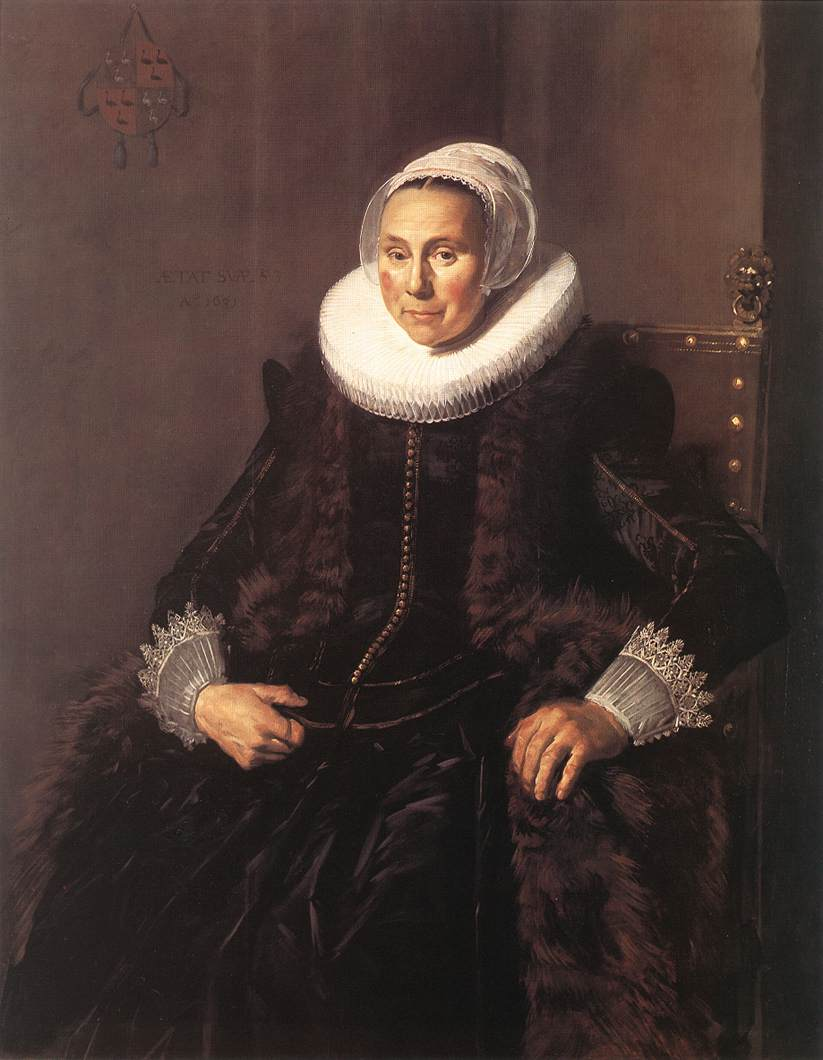

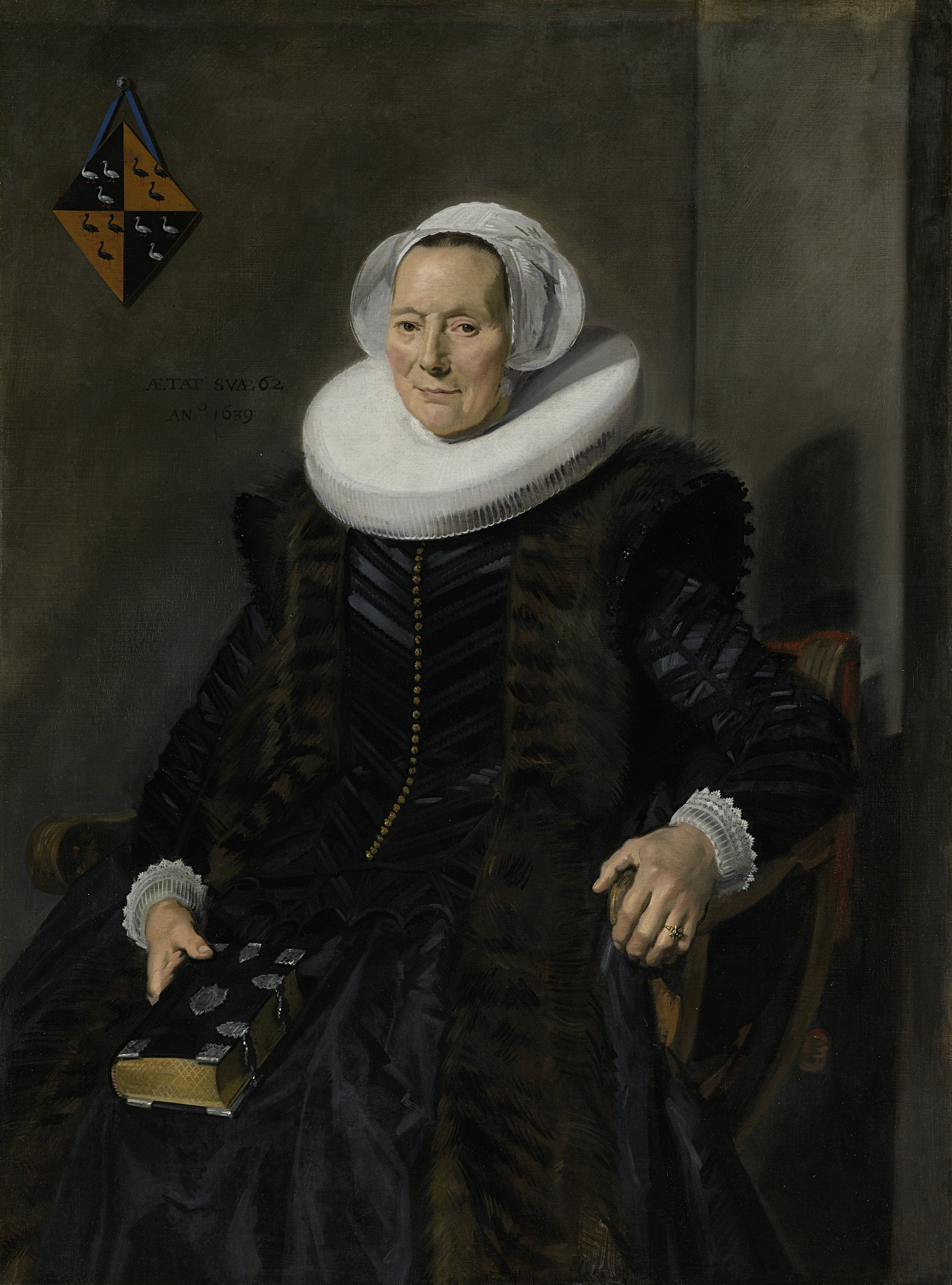

== See also ==
- List of paintings by Frans Hals
