= Johan Schatter =

Mayor of Haarlem

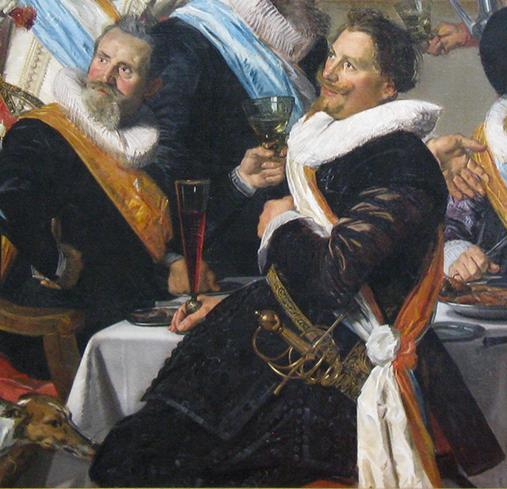
Johan Schatter, detail of schutterstuk by Frans Hals in 1627

Johan Schatter (4 October 1594 – 28 June 1673), was a Dutch Golden Age brewer from Haarlem.

== Biography ==
He was born in Haarlem as the son of the malt maker Hercules Schatter and Cornelia Jacobsdr van Os, brewers of De Gecroonde Ruyt, which he took over. Johan became a judge, magistrate, and alderman, and joined the St Adrian militia as captain and served from 1624-1627, 1636-1637, and served as fiscal/provost from 1637-1642. He was portrayed by Frans Hals twice; in his schutterstuk called The Banquet of the Officers of the St Adrian Militia Company in 1627, and again in 1633. He married Volckje, the daughter of Pieter Jacobsz Olycan on 24 April 1616.

He died in Haarlem.
