= Nicolaes Woutersz van der Meer =

Dutch brewer, magistrate and mayor of Haarlem

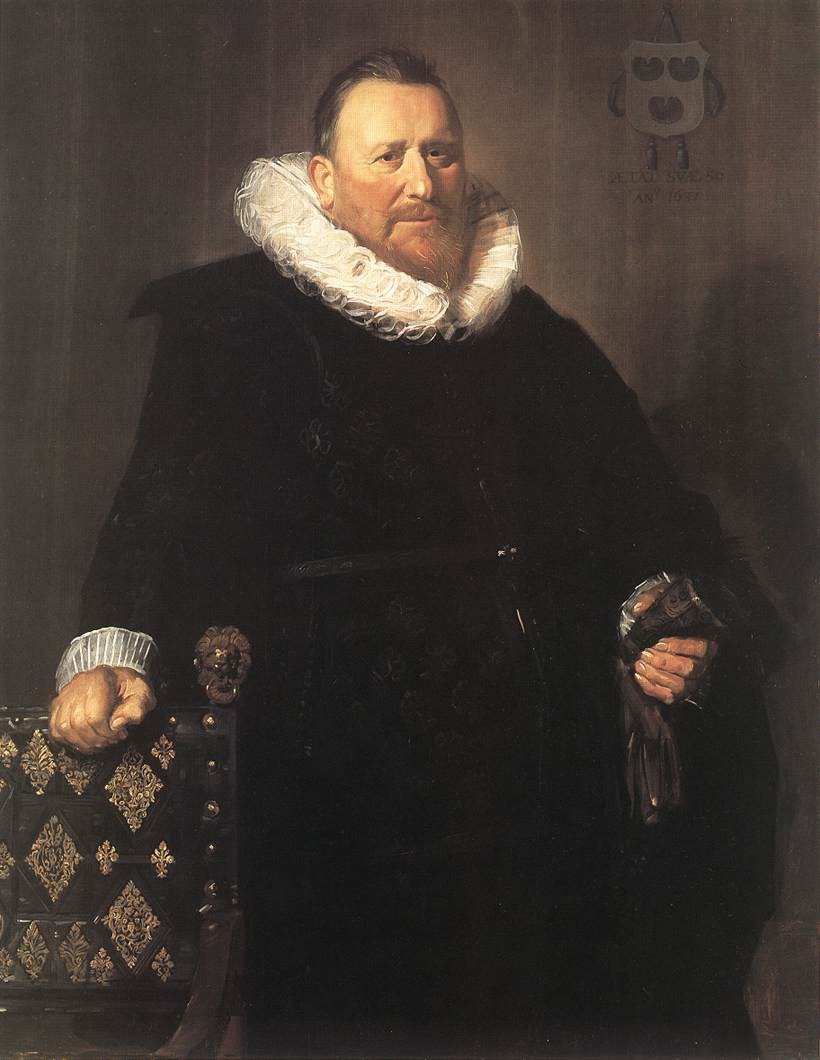
Nicolaes Woutersz van der Meer in 1631

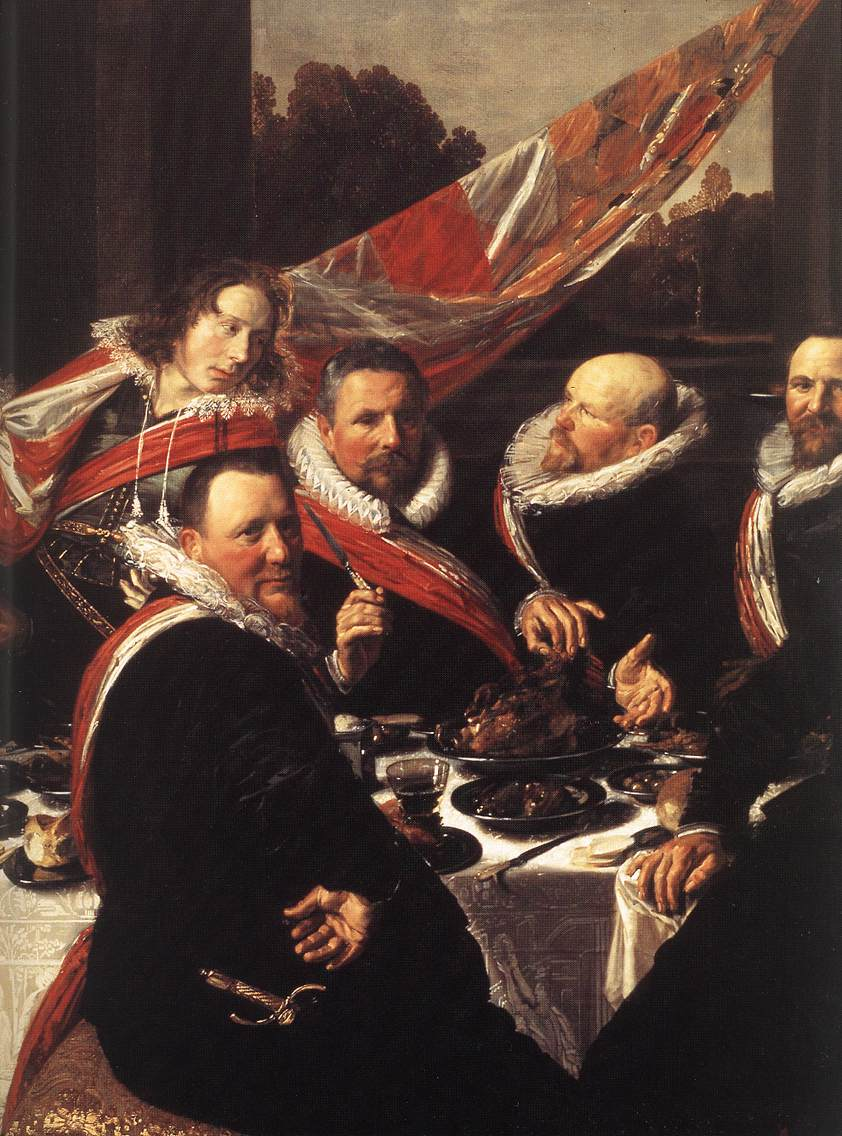
Detail of the 1616 schutterstuk, featuring Captain Nicolaes Woutersz van der Meer whose large figure fills up the table.

Nicolaes Woutersz van der Meer (1575 – 1666) was a Dutch brewer, magistrate and mayor of Haarlem, best known today for his portrait with its pendant of his wife Cornelia Claesdr Voogt, both painted by Frans Hals in 1631.

== Biography ==
He was born in Haarlem as the son of Wouter Claes Woutersz and Maria Adriaensdr van der Meer. He was first called Nicolaes Woutersz and later added his mother's surname. In 1607 he became a member of the Haarlem regency. In 1619 he became a member of the Admiralty of Amsterdam, and in 1622 he became a representative to the States-General of the Netherlands for Haarlem.

Though he is known for his wedding portrait with its pendant, Van der Meer was also portrayed as Captain of the St Jorisschutterij in Hals' The Banquet of the Officers of the St George Militia Company in 1616. These pendant portraits were painted on oak panels and after these, Hals switched to canvas and oak panel became more rare in his oeuvre. The pendants came into the possession of the Frans Hals Museum in 1883, when they were left in the estate of J.C.W. Fabricius van Leyenburg. His wife Cornelia Claesdr Voogt was a member of the Haarlem brewer family Voogt. Her brother Willem Claesz Vooght ran the Voogt brewery on the "Coude Horn", and her sister Maritge was married to the Haarlem brewer Pieter Jacobsz Olycan, all three of whom were also painted by Hals.

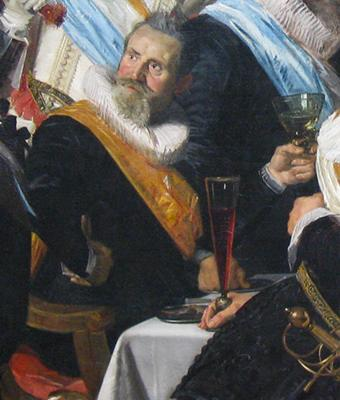
Willem Claesz Vooght as colonel in Hals' 1627 schutterstuk

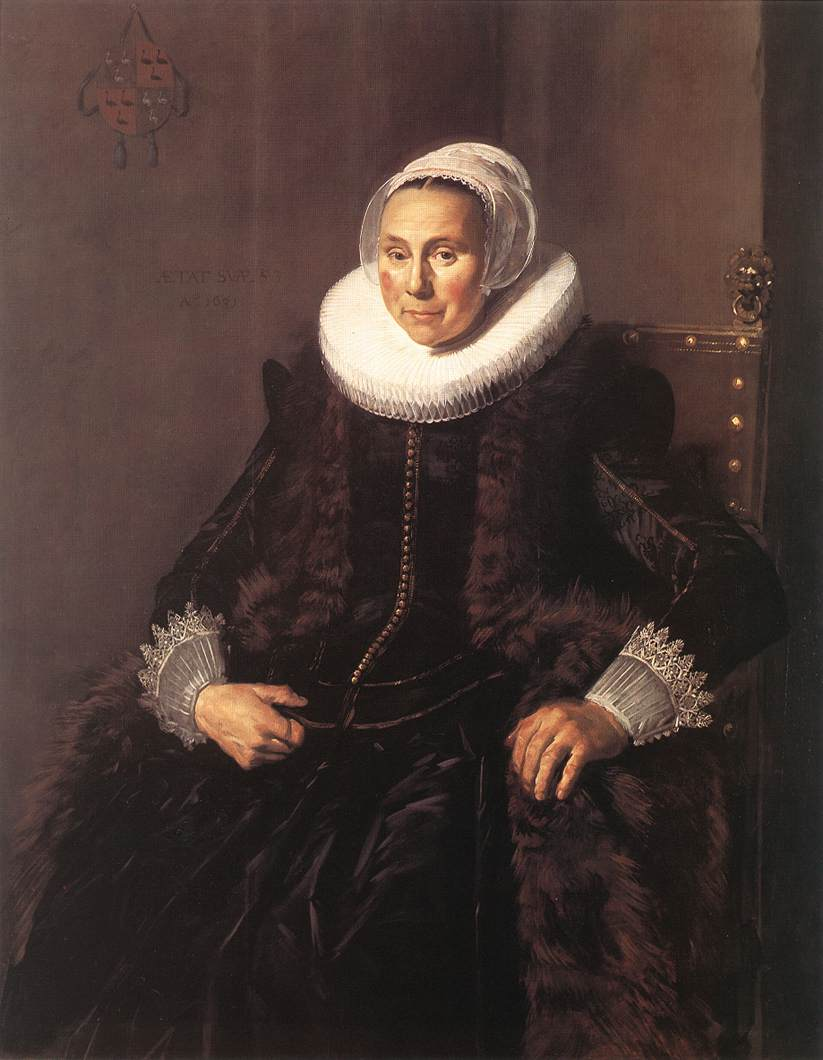
Cornelia Claesdr Voogt, Nicolaes' wife

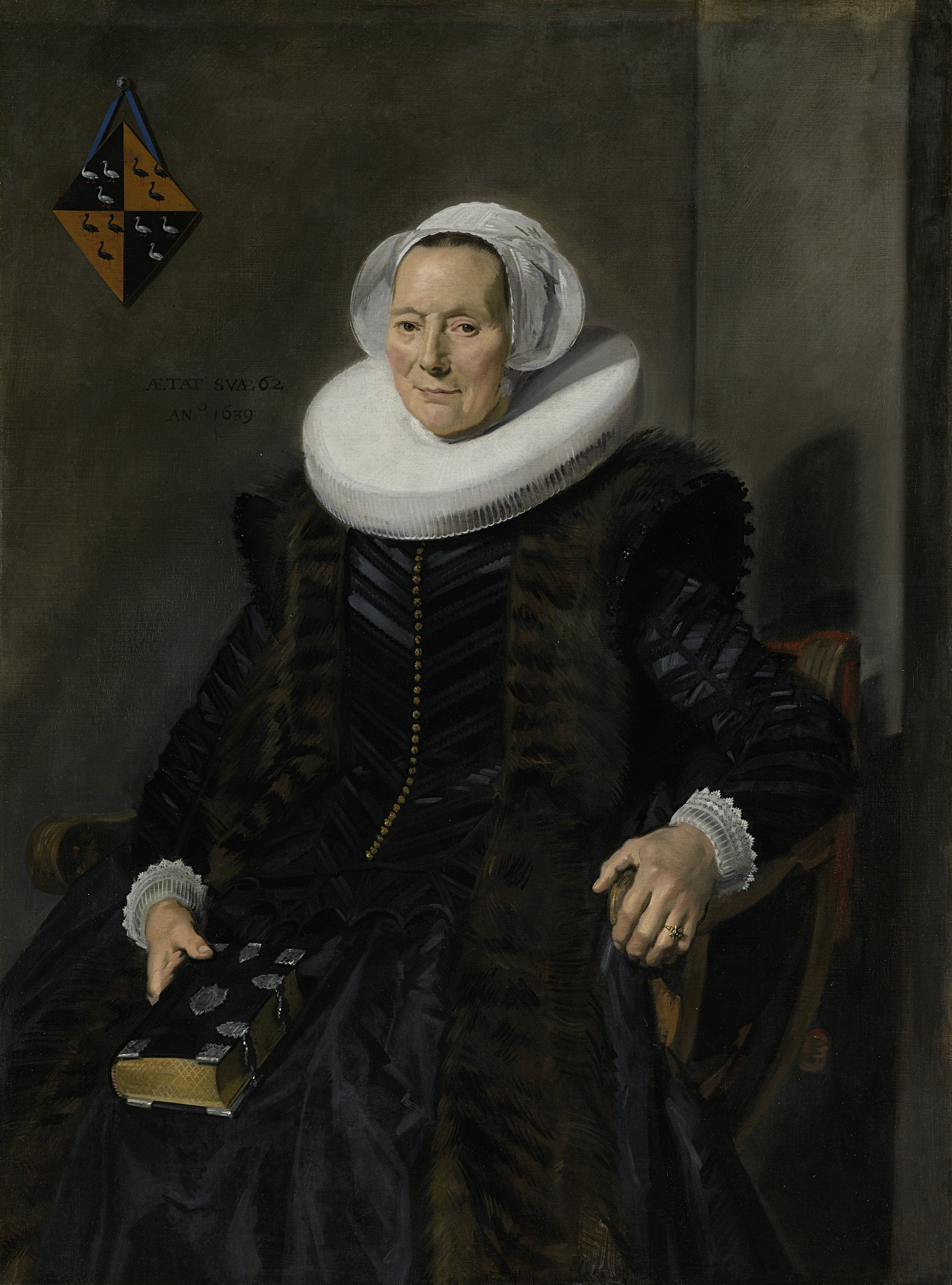
Maritge Claesdr Voogt, wife of Pieter Olycan
