= Gijsbert Claesz van Campen =

Dutch cloth merchant (died 1648)

Gijsbert Claesz van Campen (c.1580 – 1648), was a Dutch cloth merchant of Haarlem who is most famous today for his family portrait painted by Frans Hals. The sitters in this painting have been identified by Pieter Biesboer as the family of Gijsbert Claesz. van Campen and is today split into three parts; the left half is in the collection of the Toledo Museum of Art, with an extra baby lower left added by Salomon de Bray in 1628, the center half is in the collection of the Royal Museums of Fine Arts of Belgium, Brussels, and a third fragment on the far right from a private collection in Europe make up the three known surviving pieces of the original portrait. These three segments were reunited at the Toledo Museum of Art for an exhibition October 18, 2018 – January 6, 2019. The exhibition traveled to the RMFAB in Brussels from February 2 – April 28, 2019 and the Collection Frits Lugt in Paris, from June 8 – August 25, 2019.

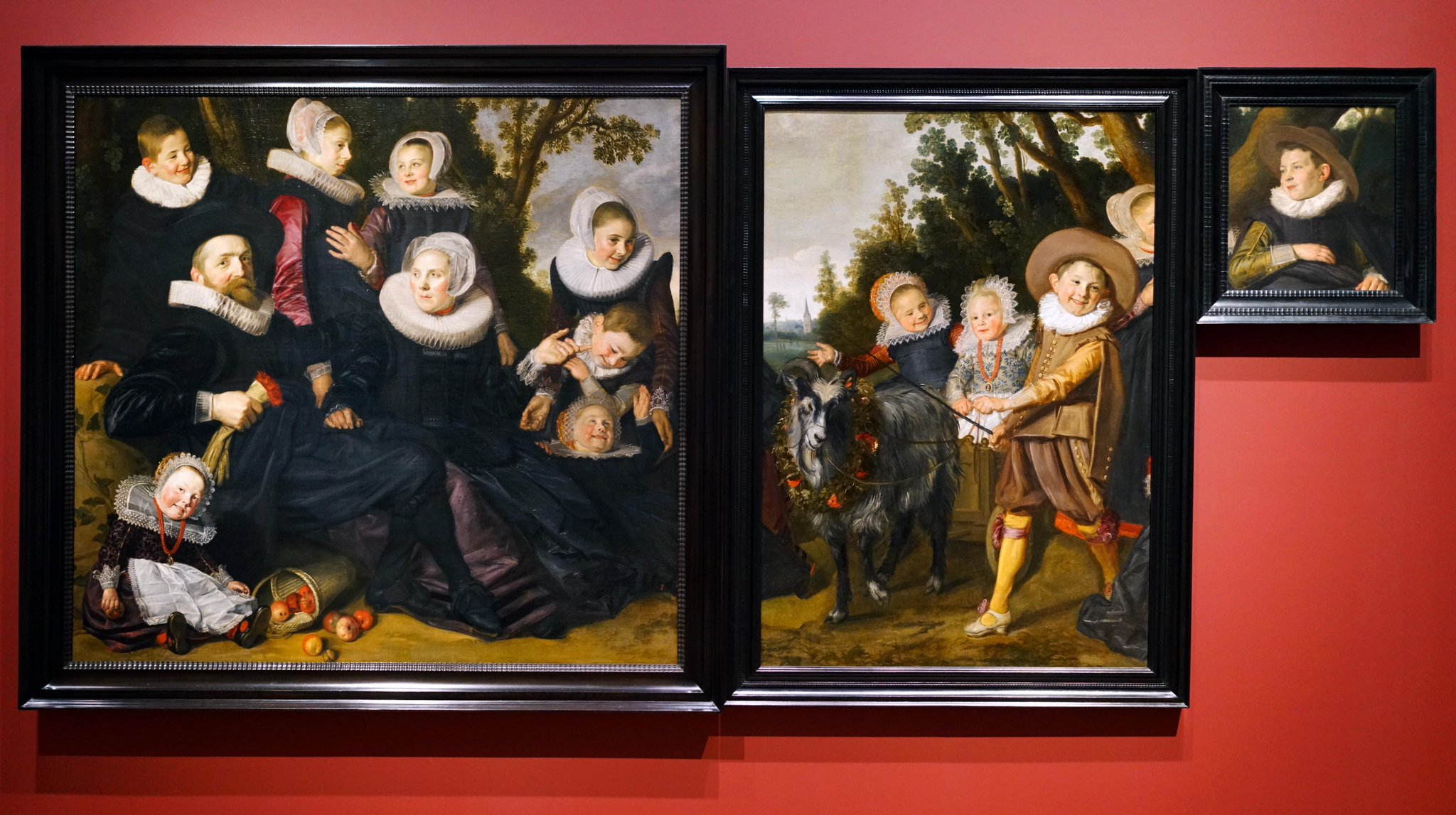
Remaining fragments of Gijsbert Claesz van Campen family portrait; the left half is in Toledo, Ohio, and the right half is in Brussels

== Biography ==
Gijsbert Claesz van Campen was born in Leiden as the son of a merchant from Amsterdam, but moved to Haarlem, where he became a cloth merchant and dean of the Merchant's guild there in 1614. He moved to Haarlem after he married Maria Joris in 1604, where they lived in a large house known as the "Bontekoe" in Kerkstraat. That is the location today of the main hall of the Hofje In den Groenen Tuin, which was completely rebuilt in the 19th century, but which is a very large house in Warmoesstraat (formerly known as Kerkstraat). Soon after his marriage, Gijbert van Campen sold half of a house in Noordwijk to Adriaen Stalpert van Wiele of Leiden in 1607, who was living in the other half. On 11 September 1625, he was the only witness for the second marriage of Floris van Dyck to Cornelia Jansdr. Vlasman.

In the painting, Gijsbert Claesz. van Campen and his wife are shown with their 10 children, seven daughters and three sons. The painting was probably commissioned in 1624 on the occasion of their 20th wedding anniversary. The eldest son Pieter is standing behind his father in the painting. He later married but died without issue. His brother Gijsbert the younger, standing on the far right with the goat cart, died young in 1641 and his other brother Cornelis is portrayed in the painting as the son whose cheek is being touched by his mother's left hand. The family was Catholic and Gijsbert's son Cornelis became a Haarlem notary who mostly dealt with other Haarlem Catholics. The painting was later inherited by Cornelis' daughter Agnes, who died in 1666. It was sometime after her death and before 1680 that the painting was cut into two, probably because the painting left the house and the walls of the new location were too small.

== Natural pose ==
The painting is the earliest known family portrait by Hals and is remarkable for its informal outside "picnic style", which became quite popular. At the time it was painted, Hals was at the peak of his fame and had already made a successful group portrait with 12 persons, The Banquet of the Officers of the St George Militia Company in 1616.
