= Andries van Hoorn =

Dutch mayor of Haarlem

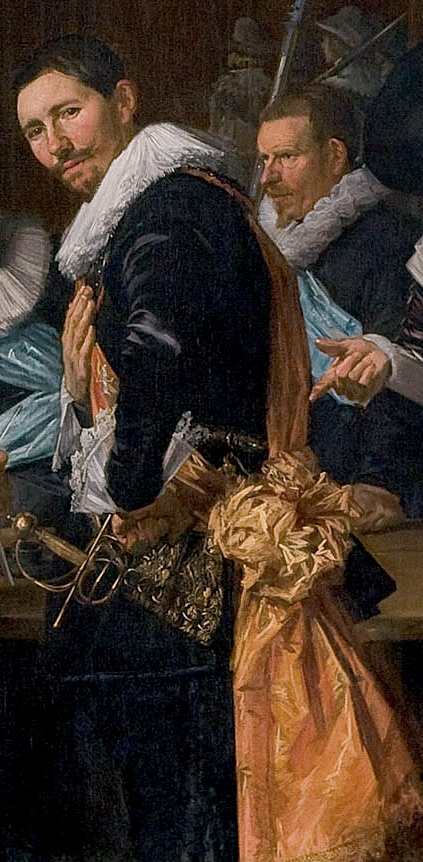
Andries van Hoorn wearing his captain's sash in 1633

Andries van Hoorn, or van der Horn (1600 – after 1660), was a Dutch mayor of Haarlem, known best today for his portraits by Frans Hals.

== Biography ==
He was born in Haarlem as the son of the Haarlem magistrate Dammas van Hoorn and Christina (Stijntje) Suyderhoeff. He was the brother of Agatha van Hoorn, who married his friend, the Haarlem mayor Cornelis Guldewagen. His sister Catherina married Jacobus Buttinga in 1628. Andries became magistrate in 1627, and captain of the schutterij in 1633, when he was painted by Frans Hals in his group portrait The Officers of the St Adrian Militia Company in 1633. He later became colonel for many years.

In his portrait of Andries as captain, Frans Hals seems to have him talking with his brother-in-law Lieutenant Buttinga who is seated in the foreground looking up at him. Andries turns towards the viewer as if he is interrupted, and it is this informal pose which set Frans Hals apart as a painter and made him popular as a group portraitist in Haarlem. His informality was copied by later artists, such as Bartholomeus van der Helst (who was possibly his pupil). Buttinga had previously been painted three years earlier as sergeant on the far right in Hendrik Pot's The Officers of the St Adrian Militia Company in 1630.

He first married Maria Camervelt and they had a daughter Christina. Then he married Maria Pietersdr Olycan, the daughter of Pieter Jacobsz Olycan, in 1638. He became mayor in 1655. Their daughter Maria van Hoorn married jhr. mr. Cornelis Ascanius van Sypesteyn (1638-1673) in 1662. He died in Haarlem.

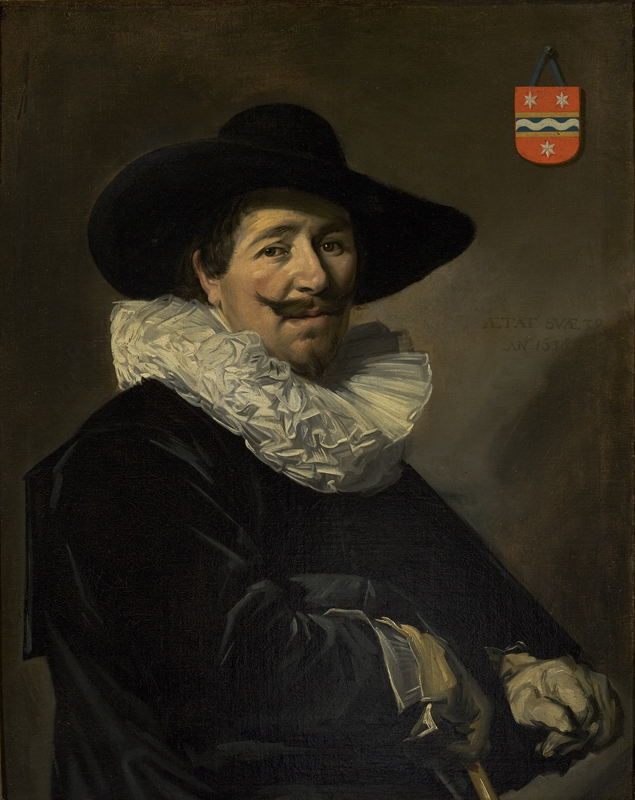
Marriage portrait of Andries

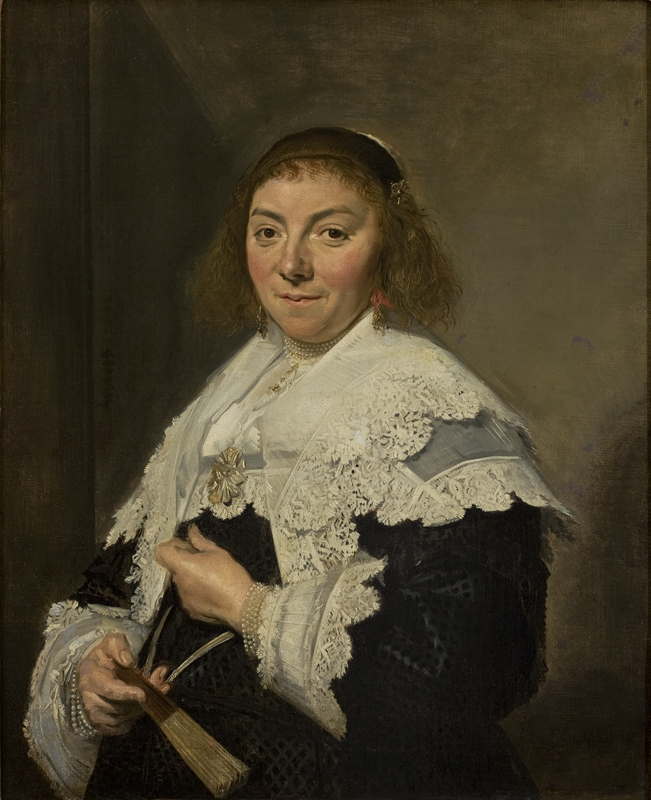
Marriage portrait of Maria
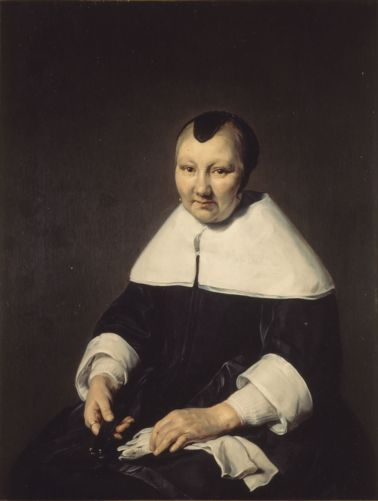
Marriage portrait of Andries' sister Agatha van Hoorn, by Jan de Bray
