= Cornelis Guldewagen =

Dutch mayor

Cornelis Guldewagen (1599 – 1663), was a Haarlem mayor, known best today for his portrait by Frans Hals.

== Biography ==
He was born in Haarlem and was admitted to the Haarlem regency in 1625, becoming mayor in 1644. In 1627 he married Agatha van Hoorn, the sister of Andries van Hoorn, and together they had 11 children. Guldewagen was a brewer (brewery "De Vergulde Hart"), but became briefly embroiled in Tulipmania when he and his associate, the Haarlem brewer Johan de Wael (brewery "De Zon"), attempted to transplant 1300 tulip bulbs in February 1637, which caused the crop to fail.

The Guldewagens' son Dammas also became a member of the Haarlem regency, and when he married Judith Loreijn of the brewery "In de Drie Starren", Jan de Bray painted his wedding portrait, and Johannes Cornelisz Verspronck, who used to live across from their house, painted Judith's portrait.

== Family portraits ==
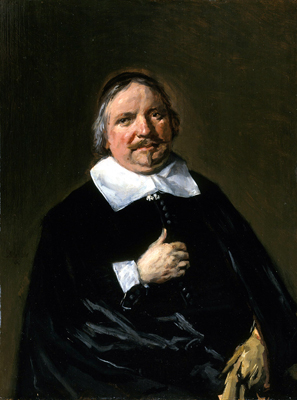
Portrait of Cornelis Guldewagen by Frans Hals in 1661

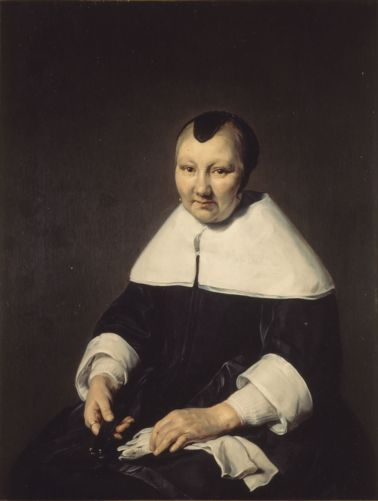
Pendant portrait of his wife Agatha van Hoorn, by Jan de Bray

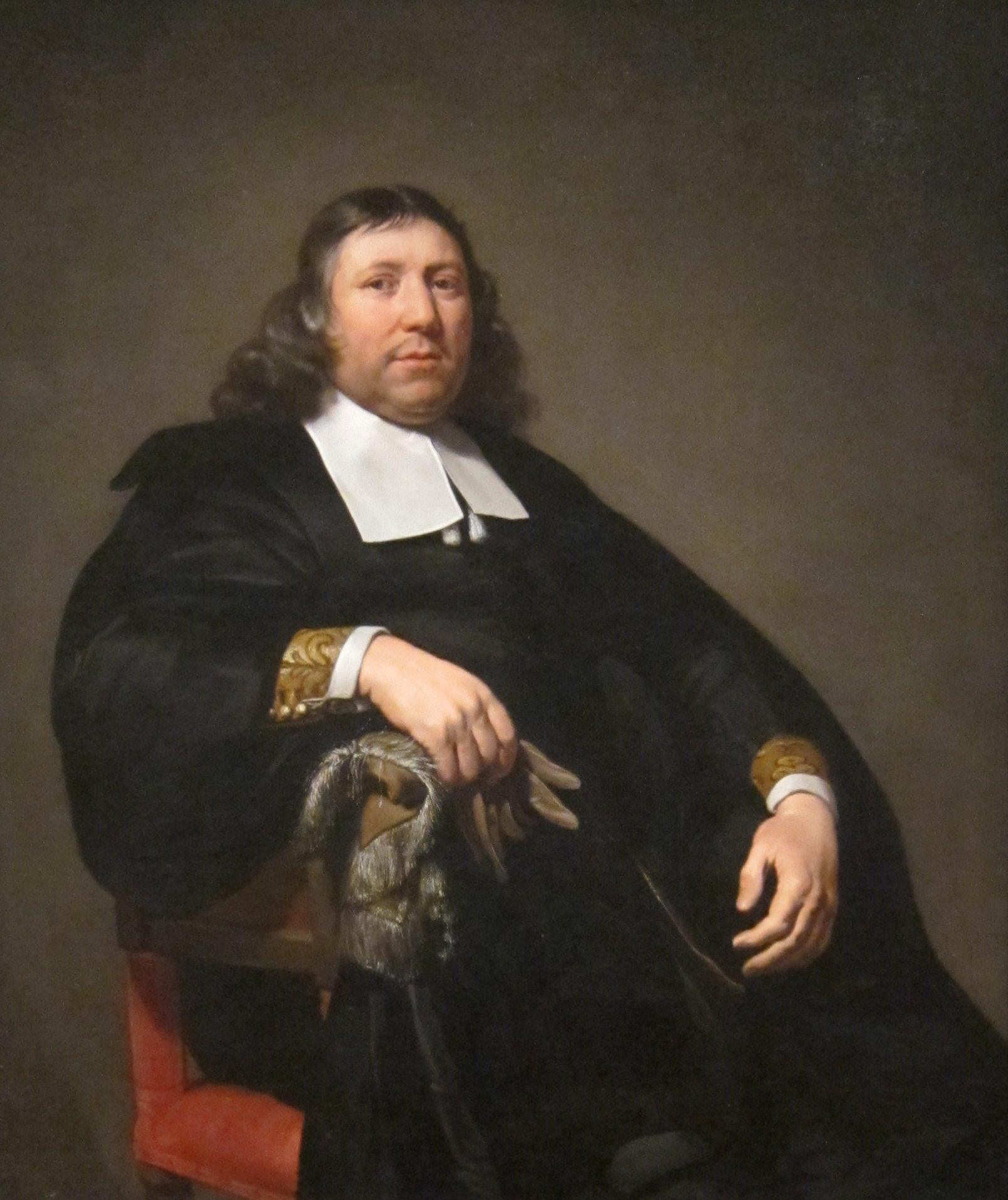
Portrait of their son Dammas Guldewagen, by Jan de Bray

== Hals portrait ==
This painting was documented by Hofstede de Groot in 1910, who wrote:

183. Cornells Guldewagen (who died in 1663), Burgomaster of Haarlem in 1642. M. 36. Half-length. A man of sixty with moustache and imperial, seated, facing the spectator. He is in black with a white collar and wristbands, and wears a black cap. His bare right hand is on his breast. His gloved left hand holds the other glove. Probably a small picture, painted between 1655 and 1660. Described from a water-colour copy by C. van Noorden in the Haarlem archives, which occurred in the sale Ekama of Haarlem, Amsterdam, April 8, 1891. See Moes, Iconographia Batava, No. 2994. Exhibited at the Royal Academy Winter Exhibition, London, 1871. Then in the Schwabe collection, London.

The painting is 40.6 by 30.5 centimetres (16.0 by 12.0 in) and is held by the Krannert Art Museum in Champaign, Illinois.
