= Tyman Oosdorp =

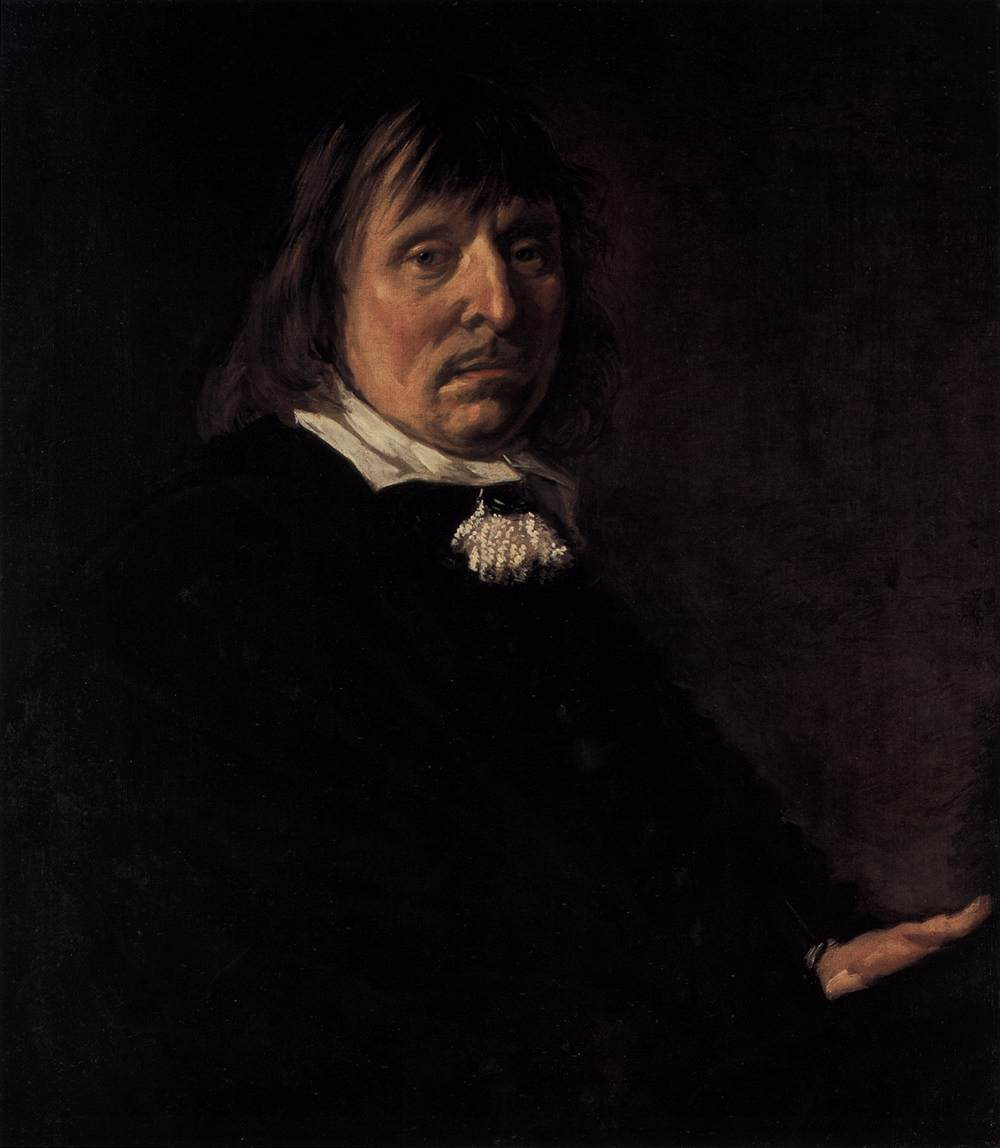
Tyman Oosdorp in 1656 by Frans Hals

Thijman, or Tyman Oosdorp (20 November 1613 – 24 August 1668), was a Dutch Golden Age brewer and magistrate of Haarlem.

== Biography ==
He was born in Amsterdam as the son of Franciscus Oosdorp, rector of the Latin School there and Maria Jansdr. On 12 July 1640, he married Hester Olycan in Haarlem, where he owned the brewery De Pauw. Hester was the daughter of the Haarlem brewer Pieter Jacobsz Olycan.

He died in Haarlem.
