= Pieter Jacobsz Olycan =

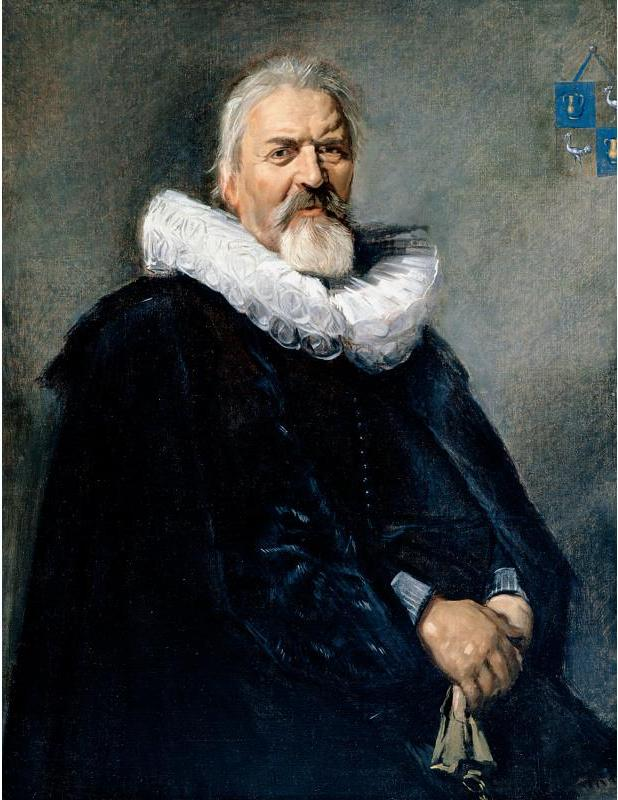
Pieter Jacobsz Olycan, by Frans Hals

Pieter Jacobsz Olycan (1572 – 1658), was a Dutch brewer, magistrate, and later mayor of Haarlem, best known today for his portraits by Frans Hals, as well as for the portraits of his wife Maritge Claesdr. Voogt.

== Biography ==
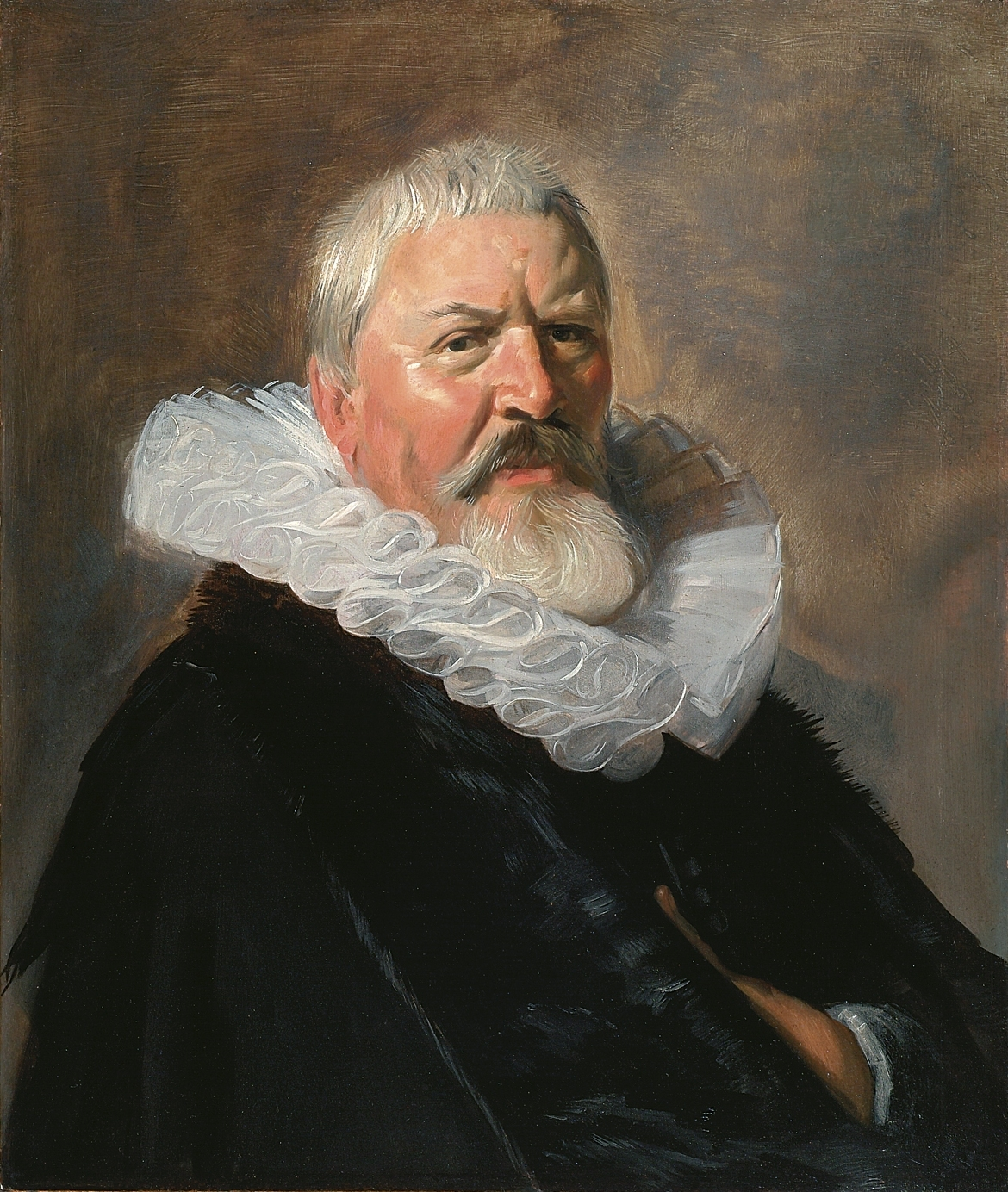
Previously assumed to be a copy of the 3/4 length portrait, this smaller panel by Frans Hals is now considered to predate it by 5 years or so.

He was a merchant in oils and grains in Amsterdam with a warehouse called "In den Olycan", which became his name. He was also a brewer in Haarlem on the Spaarne river with a large brewery called the "Vogelstruys". Pieter Olycan was one of three brewers from Haarlem who sold his “Vogelstruys” beer from a 'bierstekerij' on the Bierkade in Purmerend. He married Maritje Claesdr Voogt and through her he became the brother-in-law to two more brewers of Haarlem. They became the parents of:

1. Jacob, who later followed in his father's footsteps
2. Dorothea, who married Cornelis van Loo of brewery De Drie Leliën
3. IJsbrant, who studied law
4. Volckje, who married Johan Schatter
5. Nicolaes, who married Agatha Dicx of brewery Het Scheepje
6. Maria, who married the brewer Andries van Hoorn
7. Hester, who married Tyman Oosdorp

Pieter Olycan was a member of the Haarlem regency and became a magistrate and mayor of Haarlem, and served in the Haarlem Cluveniers Civic guard. He was portrayed by Hendrik Gerritsz Pot in his group portrait of the St Adrian Civic Guard in 1630.

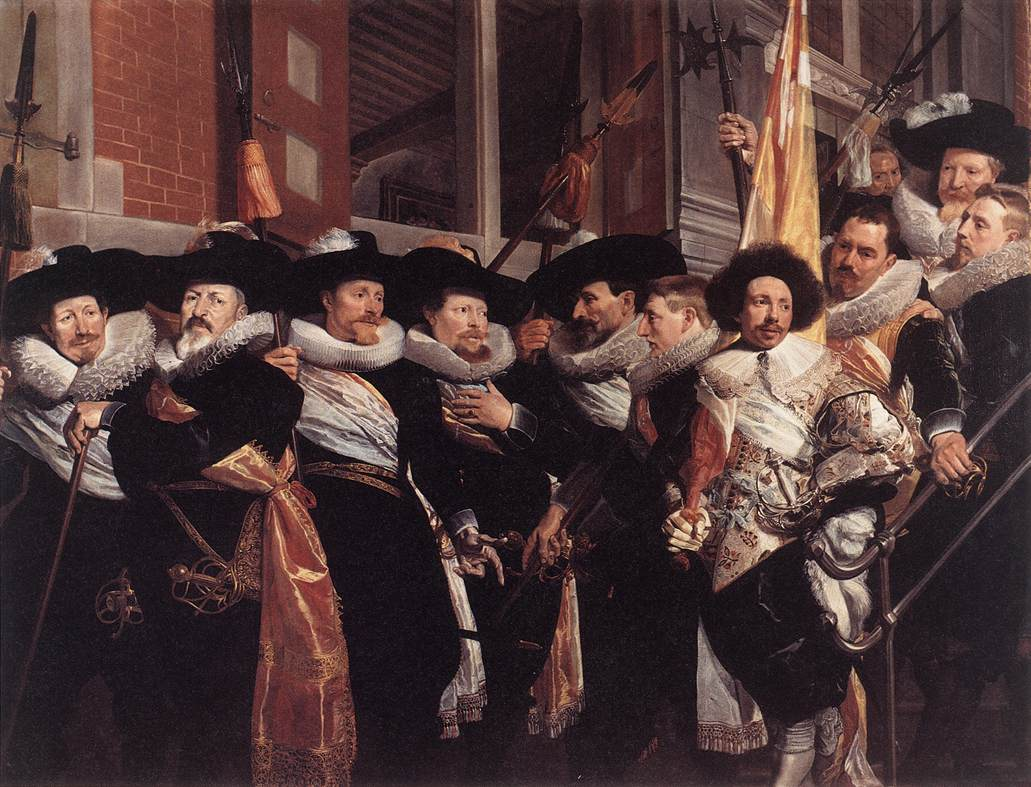
Olycan is second from left in Pot's schutterstuk

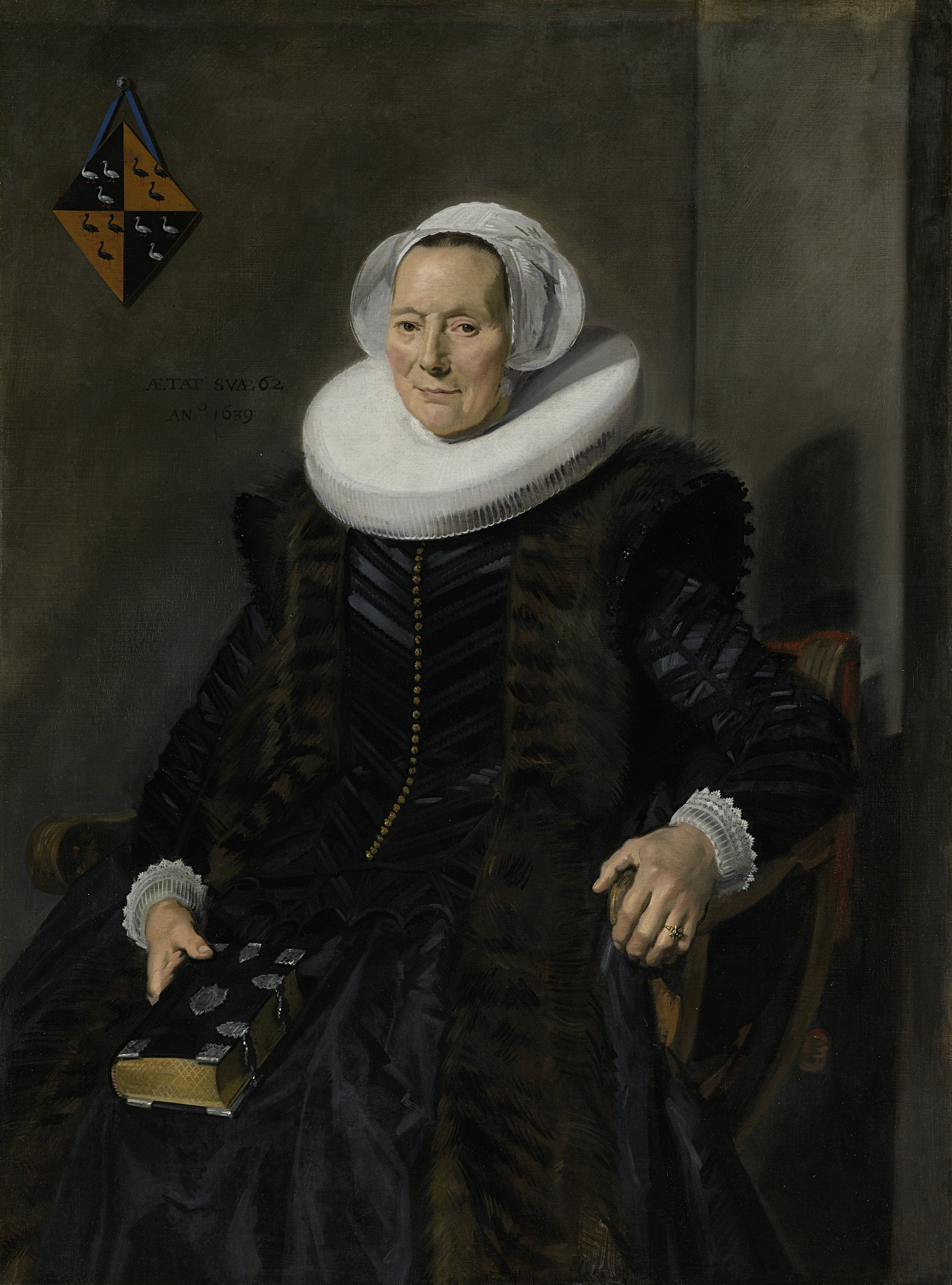
His wife Maritge Claesdr Voogt

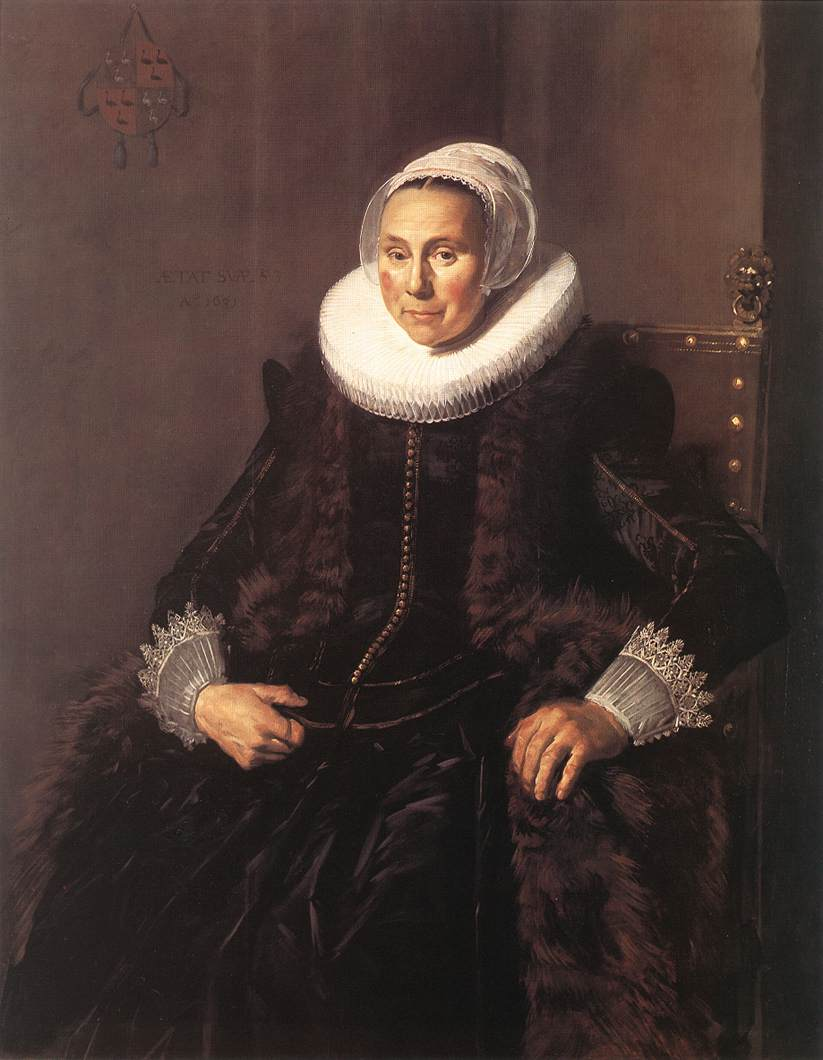
Her sister, Cornelia Claesdr Vooght

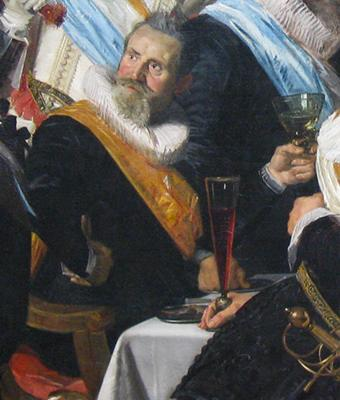
Her brother Willem Claesz Vooght as colonel in Hals' 1627 schutterstuk

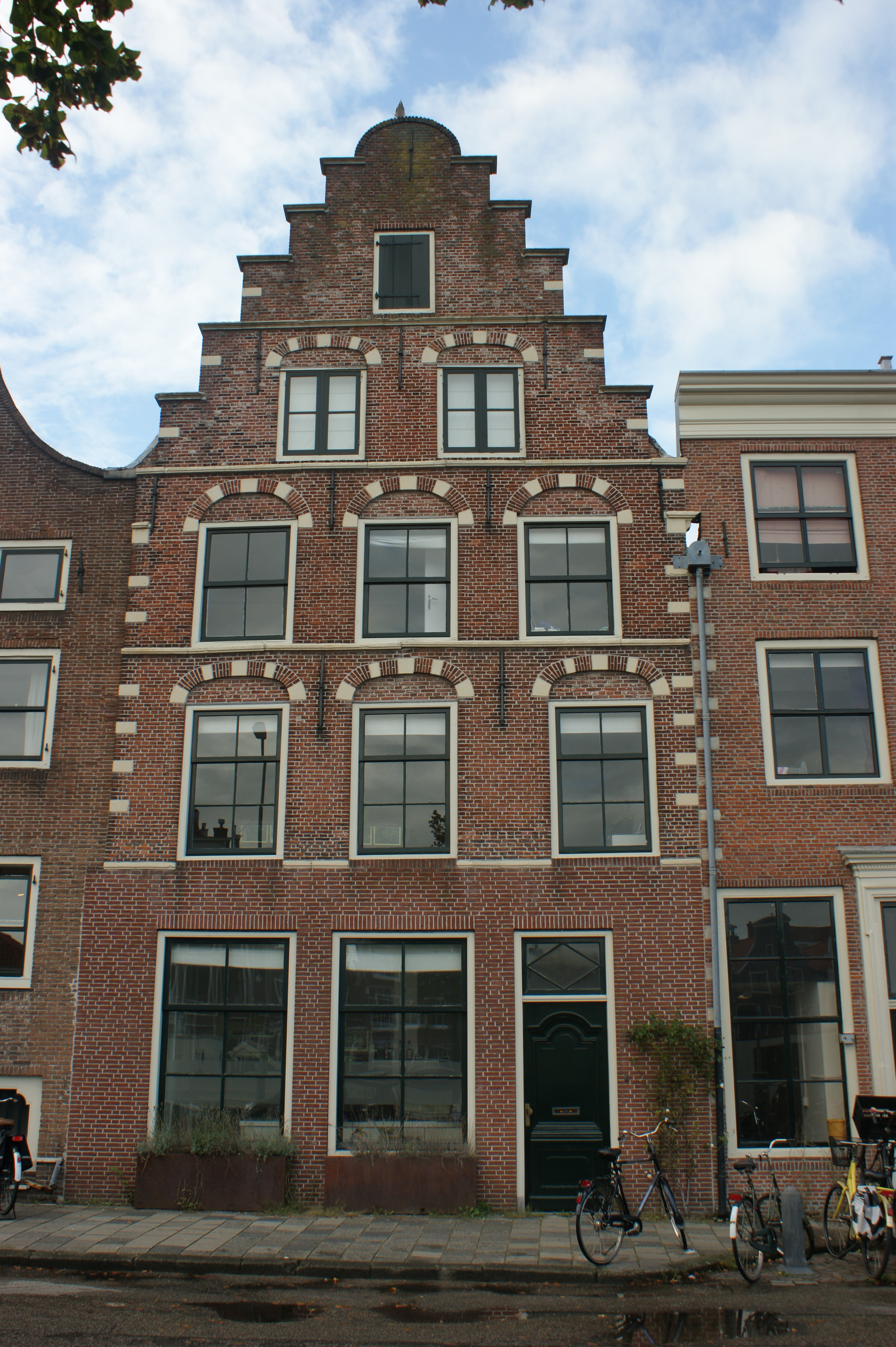
Former brewery Vogelstruys on the Spaarne in Haarlem

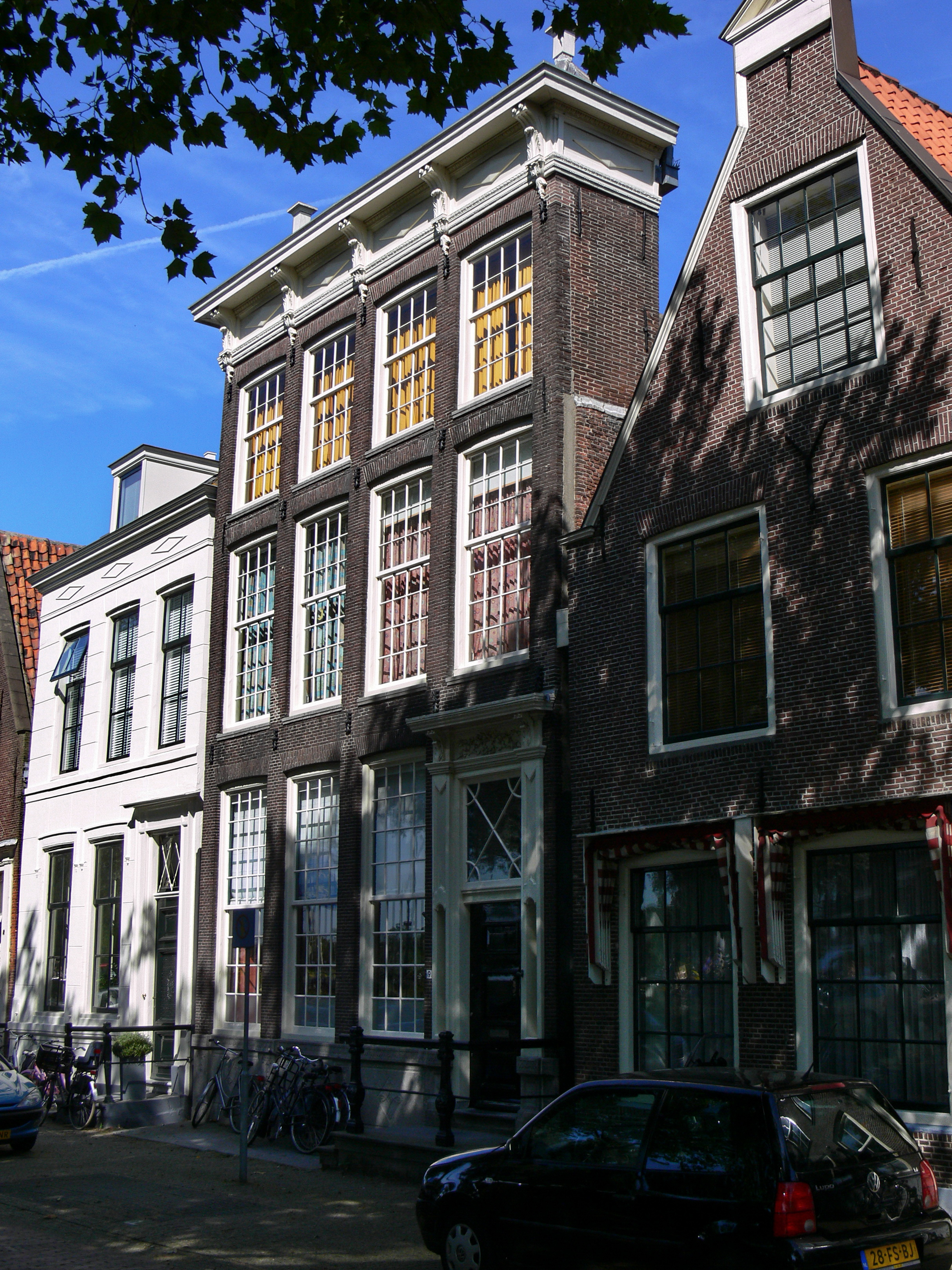
Bierkade 9 in Purmerend, still called “De Vogelstruys”
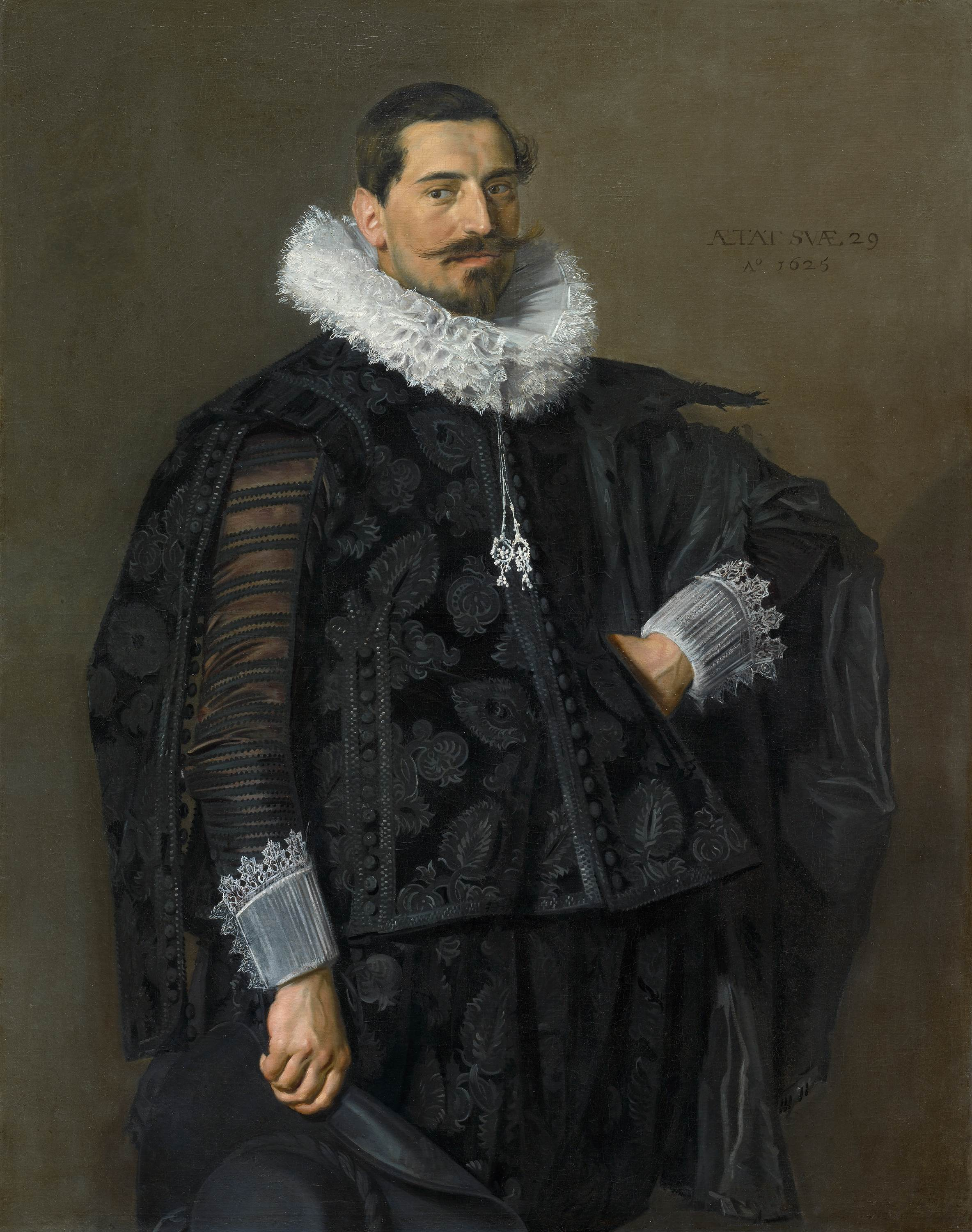
Their son Jacob

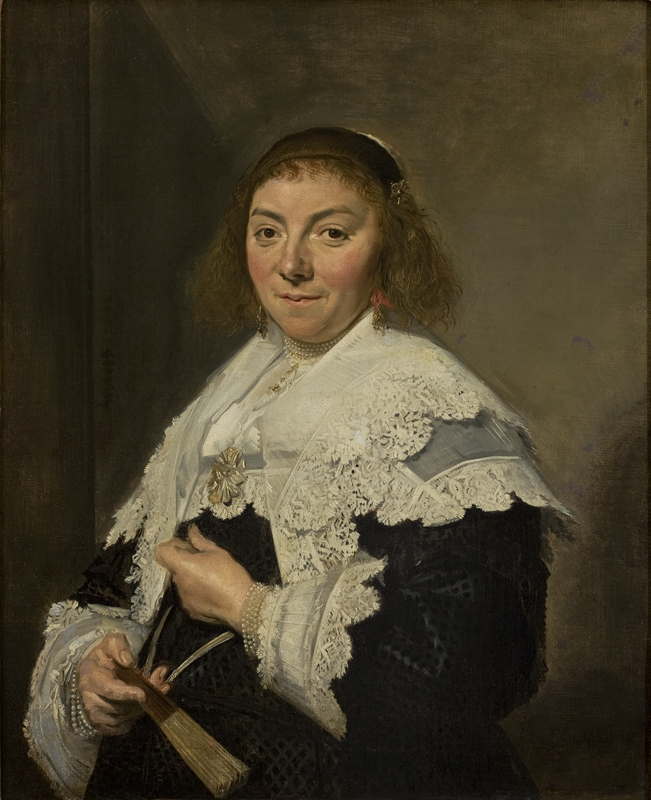
Their daughter Maria
