= Maritge Claesdr. Voogt =

Painting by Frans Hals

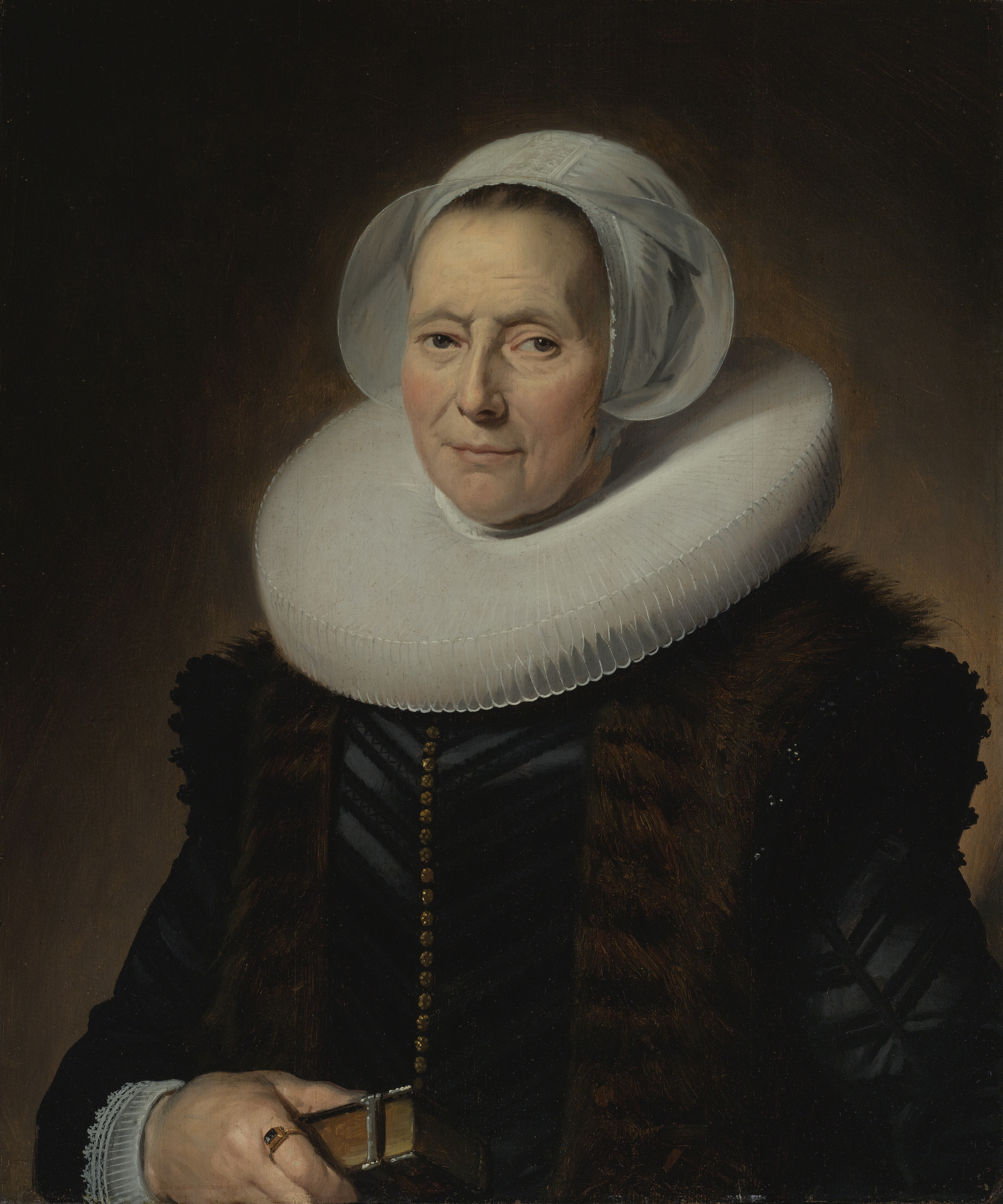
- Portrait of Maritge Claesdr. Vooght
- Artist: Frans Hals
- Year: 1639
- Catalogue: Hofstede de Groot, Catalog 1910: #211
- Medium: Oil on panel
- Dimensions: 128 cm × 94.5 cm (50 in × 37.2 in)
- Location: Private collection

Portrait of Maritge Claesdr. Vooght is an oil-on-panel painting by the Dutch Golden Age painter Frans Hals, painted in 1639 and now in a private collection. It is considered a pendant portrait to that of her husband, the Haarlem brewer and mayor Pieter Jacobsz Olycan.

== Painting ==
This painting was documented by Hofstede de Groot in 1910, who wrote:

211. MARIA CLAESDR. VOOGT (1577-1644), wife of Pieter Jacobsz Olycan, and mother of Jacob Pietersz Olycan. M. 61. Half-length. She is seen almost in full face, but slightly turned to the left, and looks at the spectator. Her right hand, holding a metal-covered book, is only half visible; the left hand is not shown. She wears a white cap, a ruff, and a black silk dress with a fur-trimmed cloak. The name of the sitter is known from an inscription on the back and from the coat-of-arms. [Pendant to 210.] Panel, 26 1/2 inches by 22 1/2 inches. Exhibited at the Guildhall, London, 1906, No. 86. – Mentioned in the inventory of her daughter Geertruyd Olycan, widow of Jacob Benningh, Haarlem, November 11, 1666 noted by A. Bredius. In the possession of Sir G. Donaldson, London. In the collection of Vernon Watney, Cornbury Park, Charlbury, Oxfordshire.

In 1974 Seymour Slive listed this painting as a copy of a portrait at three quarter length. At that time both this painting and its pendant were in private collections and he only saw photos of them. He then assumed that the later copies were the originals. Today all four paintings are considered original, but the smaller ones were painted about five years before the three-quarter length versions.

== Pendants ==
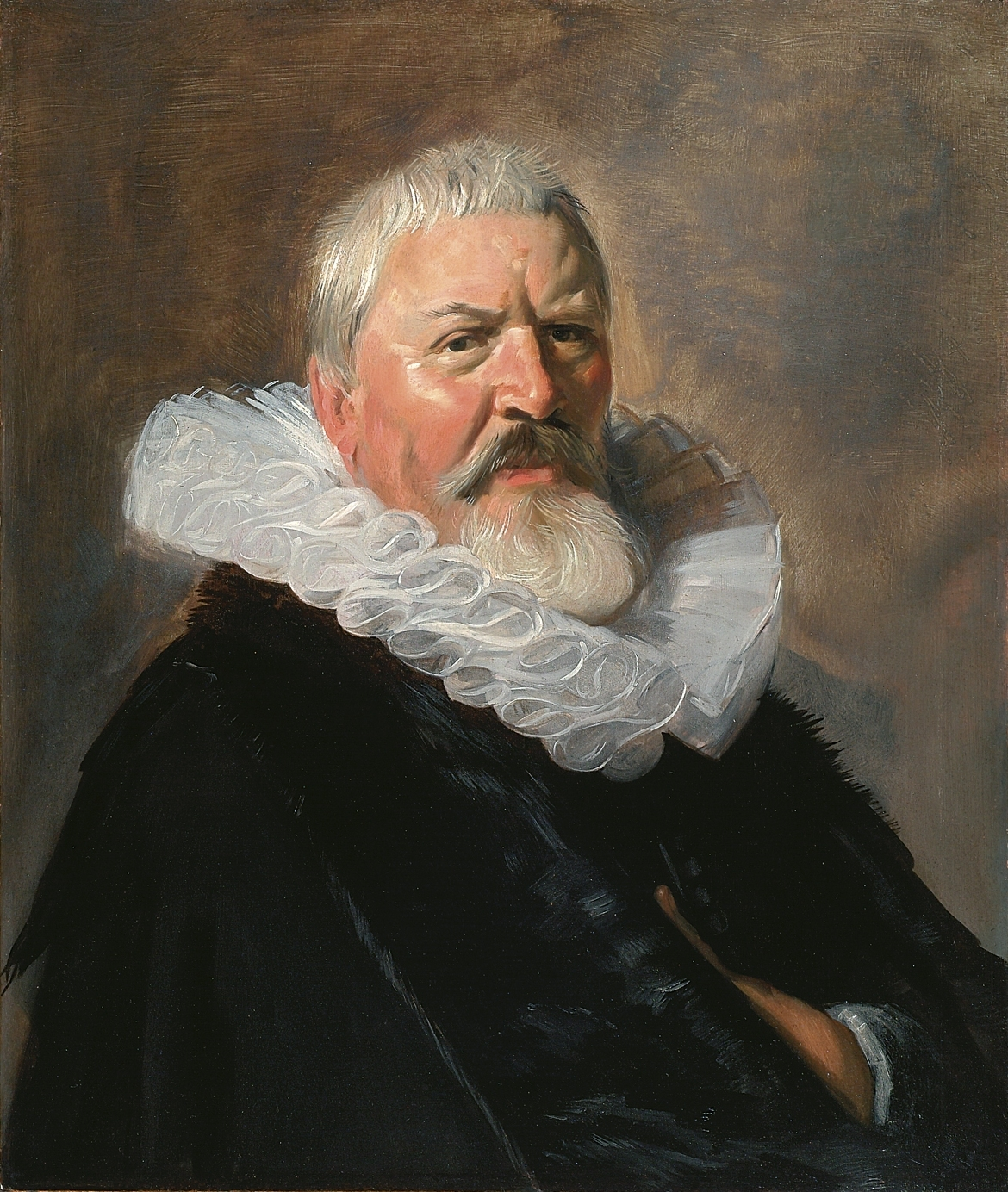

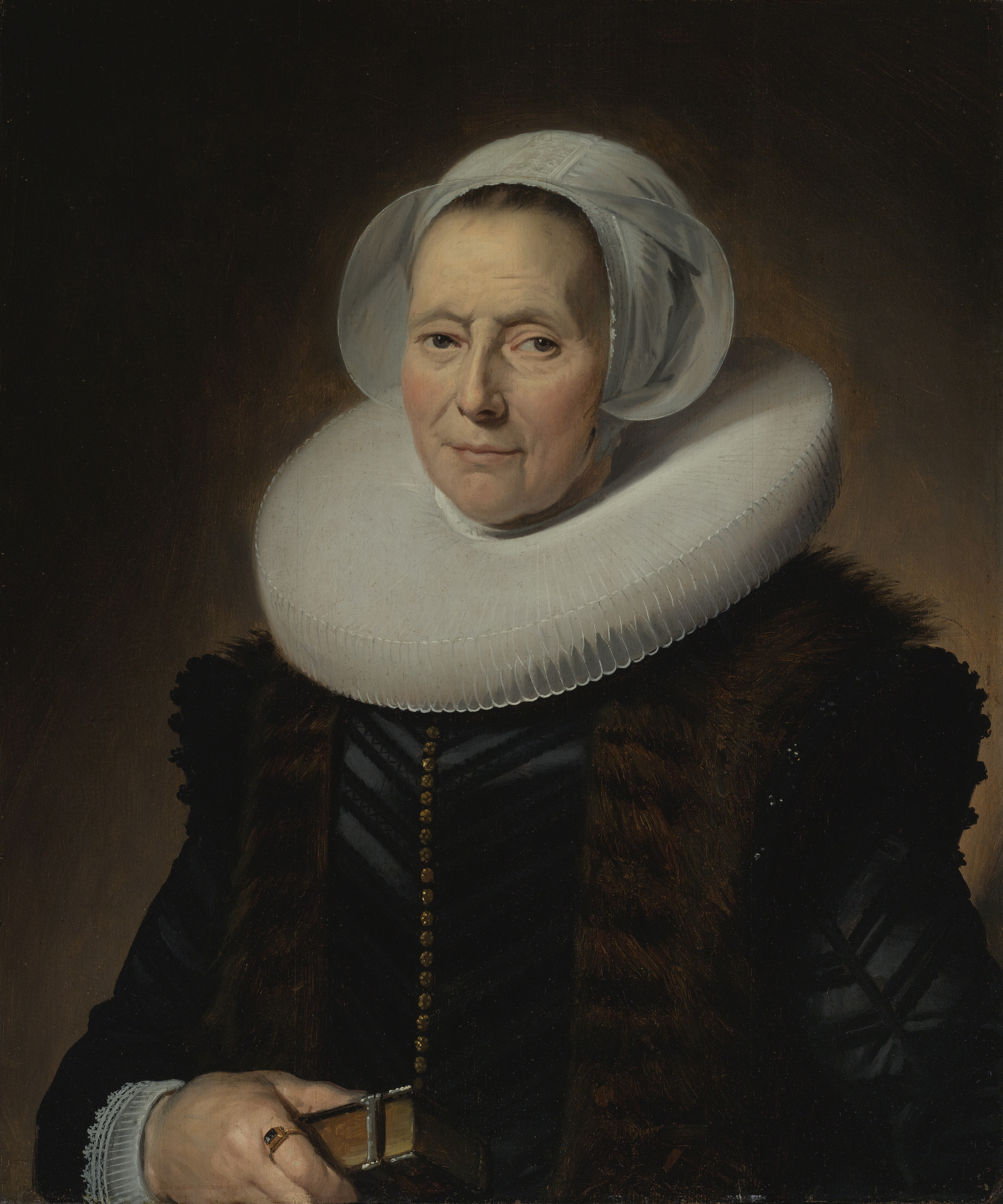
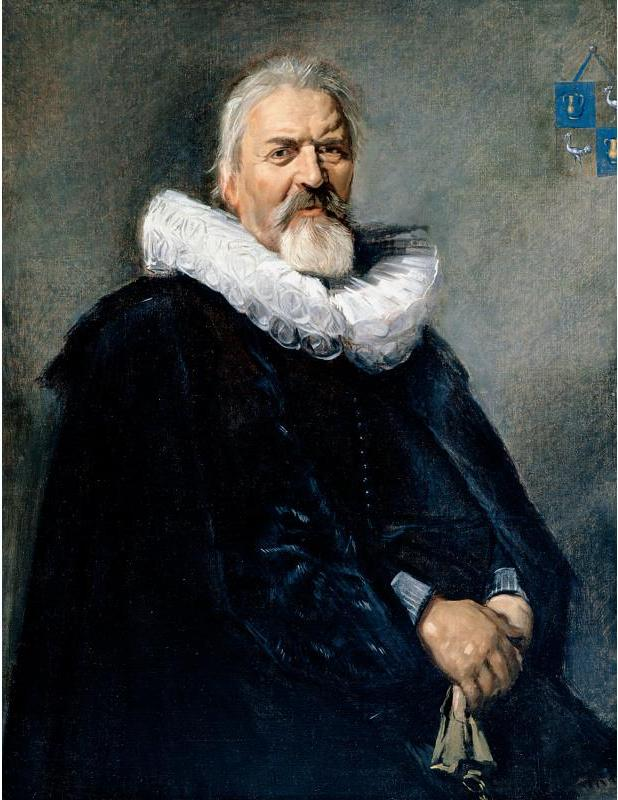

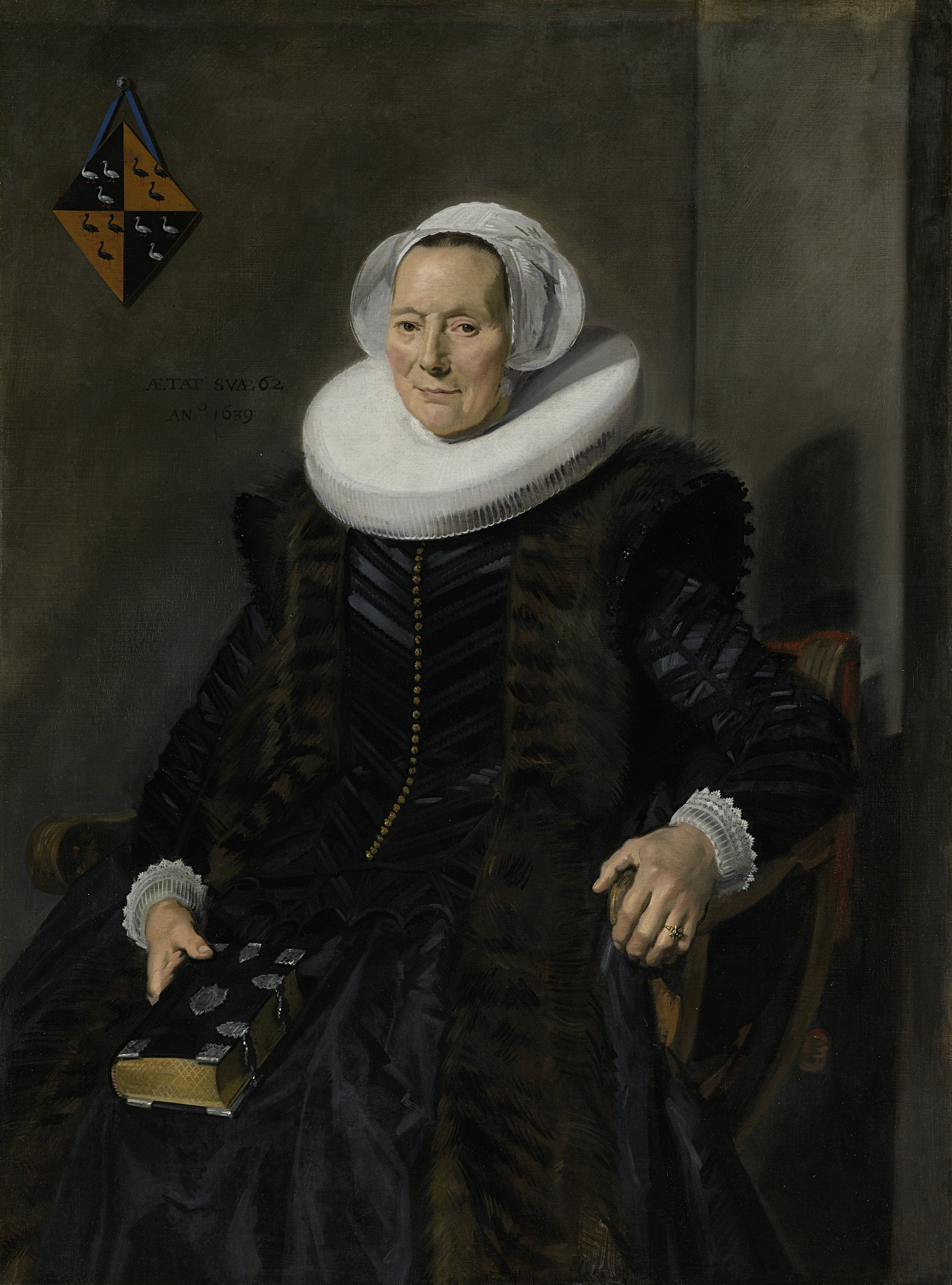

== See also ==
- List of paintings by Frans Hals
