= December 9 =

December 9 this year in various calendars
- Wednesday, 9 December 2026
| Akan | Nkyiwukuo |
| Armenian | 22 Kʿaloch 1476 |
| Aztec | Tozoztontli 8, 9 Cipactli |
| Babylonian | 28 Arakhsamna, 2337 SE |
| Balinese pawukon | Luang, Pepet, Kajeng, Jaya, Keliwon, Urukung, Buda of Gumbreg, Kala, Dadi, Manuh |
| Bengali | 24 Ogrohayon, BS 1433 |
| Chinese | Yin Fire Snake・Chariot Mansion; Fire Horse Year, Month 11, Day 1 (Daxue, 13 days until Dongzhi) |
| Common Era | 9 December 2026 CE |
| Coptic | 30 Hathor, AM 1743 |
| Egyptian | 27 Pharmuthi, 2775 NE |
| Ethiopian | 30 H̱edār, 2019 Amätä Məhrät |
| French Republican | Décade II, Octidi de Frimaire de l'Année 235 de la République |
| Gregorian | 9 December, AD 2026 |
| Hebrew | 29 Kislev, AM 5787 |
| Hindu | Jyeṣṭhā・Dhṛti; Solar: 23 Mārgaśīrṣa, 1948 SE; Lunisolar: Pratipada, Śukla pakṣa of Mārgaśīrṣa, 2083 VE; Rāudra・5127 KY・1,872,918 |
| Icelandic | Miðvikudagur, 17 Ýlir 2026 |
| Islamic | 28 Jumada al-thani, AH 1448 (using tabular method) |
| ISO week date | 2026-W50-3 |
| Japanese | 1 Shimotsuki, Reiwa 8 (Taisetsu, 13 days until Tōji) |
| Julian | 26 November, AD 2026 (AM 7535) |
| Julian day | 2461384 |
| Korean | 1 Jwidal, 4359 DE |
| Maya | 13.0.14.3.1; 14 Mac, 9 Imix |
| Roman | ante diem VI Kalendas Decembres, MMDCCLXXIX AUC |
| Solar Hijri | 18 Azar, SH 1405 |
| Tibetan | 1 mgo, me pho rta 2153 or 1772 or 1000 |

| << | December | | | | | >> |
| Su | Mo | Tu | We | Th | Fr | Sa |
| | | 1 | 2 | 3 | 4 | 5 |
| 6 | 7 | 8 | 9 | 10 | 11 | 12 |
| 13 | 14 | 15 | 16 | 17 | 18 | 19 |
| 20 | 21 | 22 | 23 | 24 | 25 | 26 |
| 27 | 28 | 29 | 30 | 31 |
2026

December 9 in recent years
2025 (Tuesday)
2024 (Monday)
2023 (Saturday)
2022 (Friday)
2021 (Thursday)
2020 (Wednesday)
2019 (Monday)
2018 (Sunday)
2017 (Saturday)
2016 (Friday)

December 9 is the 343rd day of the year (344th in leap years) in the Gregorian calendar; 22 days remain until the end of the year.

== Events ==
=== Pre-1600 ===
- 536 – Gothic War: The Byzantine general Belisarius enters Rome unopposed; the Gothic garrison flees the capital.
- 730 – Battle of Marj Ardabil: The Khazars annihilate an Umayyad army and kill its commander, al-Jarrah ibn Abdallah al-Hakami.
- 1432 – The first battle between the forces of Švitrigaila and Sigismund Kęstutaitis is fought near the town of Oszmiana (Ashmyany), launching the most active phase of the Lithuanian Civil War.
- 1531 – The Virgin of Guadalupe first appears to Juan Diego at Tepeyac, Mexico City.

=== 1601–1900 ===
- 1636 – The Qing dynasty of China, led by Emperor Hong Taiji, invades Joseon.
- 1775 – American Revolutionary War: British troops and Loyalists, misinformed about Patriot militia strength, lose the Battle of Great Bridge, ending British rule in Virginia.
- 1822 – French physicist Augustin-Jean Fresnel, in a memoir read to the Academy of Sciences, coins the terms linear polarization, circular polarization, and elliptical polarization, and reports a direct refraction experiment verifying his theory that optical rotation is a form of birefringence.
- 1824 – Patriot forces led by General Antonio José de Sucre defeat a Royalist army in the Battle of Ayacucho, putting an end to the Peruvian War of Independence.
- 1835 – Texas Revolution: The Texian Army captures San Antonio following the Siege of Béxar.
- 1851 – The first YMCA in North America is established in Montreal.
- 1856 – The Iranian city of Bushehr surrenders to occupying British forces.
- 1861 – American Civil War: The Joint Committee on the Conduct of the War is established by Congress.
- 1868 – The first traffic lights are installed, outside the Palace of Westminster in London. Resembling railway signals, they use semaphore arms and are illuminated at night by red and green gas lamps.
- 1872 – In Louisiana, P. B. S. Pinchback becomes the first African American governor of a U.S. state following the impeachment of Henry C. Warmoth.
- 1893 – National Assembly bombing by Auguste Vaillant during the Ère des attentats (1892–1894).

=== 1901–present ===
- 1905 – In France, a law separating church and state is passed.
- 1911 – A mine explosion near Briceville, Tennessee, kills 84 miners despite rescue efforts led by the United States Bureau of Mines.
- 1917 – World War I: Field Marshal Allenby captures Jerusalem from the Ottoman Empire.
- 1917 – World War I: The Kingdom of Romania signs the Armistice of Focșani with the Central Powers.
- 1922 – Gabriel Narutowicz is elected the first president of Poland.
- 1931 – The Constituent Cortes approves a constitution which establishes the Second Spanish Republic.
- 1935 – Student protests occur in Beijing's Tiananmen Square, and are subsequently dispersed by government authorities.
- 1935 – Walter Liggett, an American newspaper editor and muckraker, is killed in a gangland murder.
- 1937 – Second Sino-Japanese War: Battle of Nanking: Japanese troops under the command of Lt. Gen. Yasuhiko Asaka launch an assault on the Chinese city of Nanking.
- 1940 – World War II: Operation Compass: British and Indian troops under the command of Major-General Richard O'Connor attack Italian forces near Sidi Barrani in Egypt.
- 1941 – World War II: China, Cuba, Guatemala, and the Philippine Commonwealth declare war on Germany and Japan.
- 1946 – The subsequent Nuremberg trials begin with the Doctors' Trial, prosecuting physicians and officers alleged to be involved in Nazi human experimentation and mass murder under the guise of euthanasia.
- 1946 – The Constituent Assembly of India meets for the first time to write the Constitution of India.
- 1948 – The Genocide Convention is adopted.
- 1950 – Cold War: Harry Gold is sentenced to 30 years in jail for helping Klaus Fuchs pass information about the Manhattan Project to the Soviet Union. His testimony is later instrumental in the prosecution of Julius and Ethel Rosenberg.
- 1953 – Red Scare: General Electric announces that all communist employees will be discharged from the company.
- 1956 – Trans-Canada Air Lines Flight 810-9, a Canadair North Star, crashes near Hope, British Columbia, Canada, killing all 62 people on board.
- 1956 – An Aeroflot Lisunov Li-2 crashes near Anadyr, killing all 12 people on board.
- 1960 – The first episode of Coronation Street, the world's longest-running television soap opera, is broadcast in the United Kingdom.
- 1961 – Tanganyika becomes independent from Britain.
- 1965 – Kecksburg UFO incident: A fireball is seen from Michigan to Pennsylvania; with witnesses reporting something crashing in the woods near Pittsburgh.
- 1968 – Douglas Engelbart gave what became known as "The Mother of All Demos", publicly debuting the computer mouse, hypertext, and the bit-mapped graphical user interface using the oN-Line System (NLS).
- 1969 – U.S. Secretary of State William P. Rogers proposes his plan for a ceasefire in the War of Attrition; Egypt and Jordan accept it over the objections of the PLO, which leads to civil war in Jordan in September 1970.
- 1971 – Indo-Pakistani War: The Indian Air Force executes an airdrop of Indian Army units, bypassing Pakistani defences.
- 1973 – British and Irish authorities sign the Sunningdale Agreement in an attempt to establish a power-sharing Northern Ireland Executive and a cross-border Council of Ireland.
- 1979 – The eradication of the smallpox virus is certified, making smallpox the first of only two diseases that have been driven to extinction (with rinderpest in 2011 being the other).
- 1987 – Israeli–Palestinian conflict: The First Intifada begins in the Gaza Strip and West Bank.
- 1992 – American troops land in Somalia for Operation Restore Hope.
- 1996 – Gwen Jacob is acquitted of committing an indecent act, giving women the right to be topless in Ontario, Canada.
- 2003 – A blast in the center of Moscow kills six people and wounds several more.
- 2006 – Space Shuttle program: Space Shuttle Discovery is launched on STS-116 carrying the P5 truss segment of the International Space Station.
- 2008 – Governor of Illinois Rod Blagojevich is arrested by federal officials for crimes including attempting to sell the U.S. Senate seat being vacated by President-elect Barack Obama.
- 2012 – A plane crash in Mexico kills seven people including singer Jenni Rivera.
- 2013 – At least seven are dead and 63 are injured following a train accident near Bintaro, Indonesia.
- 2016 – President Park Geun-hye of South Korea is impeached by the country's National Assembly in response to a major political scandal.
- 2016 – At least 57 people are killed and a further 177 injured when two schoolgirl suicide bombers attack a market area in Madagali, Adamawa, Nigeria in the Madagali suicide bombings.
- 2017 – The Marriage Amendment Bill receives royal assent and comes into effect, making Australia the 26th country to legalize same-sex marriage.
- 2019 – A volcano on Whakaari / White Island, New Zealand, kills 22 people after it erupts.
- 2021 – Fifty-five people are killed and more than 100 injured when a truck with 160 migrants from Central America overturned in Chiapas, Mexico.

== Births ==
=== Pre-1600 ===
- 1392 – Peter, Duke of Coimbra (died 1449)
- 1447 – Chenghua Emperor of China (died 1487)
- 1482 – Frederick II, Elector Palatine (died 1556)
- 1493 – Íñigo López de Mendoza, 4th Duke of the Infantado (died 1566)
- 1508 – Gemma Frisius, Dutch mathematician and cartographer (died 1555)
- 1561 – Edwin Sandys, English lawyer and politician (died 1629)
- 1571 – Metius, Dutch mathematician and astronomer (died 1635)
- 1579 – Martin de Porres, Peruvian saint (died 1639)
- 1594 – Gustavus Adolphus of Sweden (died 1632)

=== 1601–1900 ===
- 1608 – John Milton, English poet and philosopher (died 1674)
- 1610 – Baldassare Ferri, Italian singer and actor (died 1680)
- 1617 – Richard Lovelace, English poet (died 1657)
- 1652 – Augustus Quirinus Rivinus, German physician and botanist (died 1723)
- 1667 – William Whiston, English mathematician, historian, and theologian (died 1752)
- 1717 – Johann Joachim Winckelmann, German archaeologist and historian (died 1768)
- 1721 – Peter Pelham, English-American organist and composer (died 1805)
- 1728 – Pietro Alessandro Guglielmi, Italian composer (died 1804)
- 1742 – Carl Wilhelm Scheele, Swedish Pomeranian and German pharmaceutical chemist (died 1786)
- 1745 – Maddalena Laura Sirmen, Italian violinist and composer (died 1818)
- 1748 – Claude Louis Berthollet, French chemist and academic (died 1822)
- 1752 – Antoine Étienne de Tousard, French general and engineer (died 1813)
- 1768 – Joseph Desha, American politician (died 1842)
- 1787 – John Dobson, English architect, designed Eldon Square and Lilburn Tower (died 1865)
- 1779 – Tabitha Babbitt, American tool maker and inventor (died 1853)
- 1806 – Jean-Olivier Chénier, Canadian physician (died 1838)
- 1813 – Thomas Andrews, Irish chemist and physicist (died 1885)
- 1837 – Émile Waldteufel, French pianist, composer, and conductor (died 1915)
- 1842 – Peter Kropotkin, Russian zoologist, economist, geographer, and philosopher (died 1921)
- 1845 – Joel Chandler Harris, American journalist and author (died 1908)
- 1850 – Emma Abbott, American soprano and actress (died 1891)
- 1861 – Hélène Smith, French psychic and occultist (died 1929)
- 1867 – Gregorios Xenopoulos, Greek journalist and author (died 1951)
- 1868 – Fritz Haber, Polish-German chemist and academic, Nobel Prize laureate (died 1934)
- 1870 – Ida S. Scudder, Indian physician and missionary (died 1960)
- 1870 – Francisco S. Carvajal, Mexican lawyer and politician, president 1914 (died 1932)
- 1871 – Joe Kelley, American baseball player and manager (died 1943)
- 1873 – George Blewett, Canadian philosopher, author, and academic (died 1912)
- 1875 – Harry Miller, American engineer (died 1943)
- 1876 – Berton Churchill, Canadian-American actor and singer (died 1940)
- 1882 – Elmer Booth, American actor (died 1915)
- 1882 – Joaquín Turina, Spanish-French composer, critic, and educator (died 1949)
- 1883 – Nikolai Luzin, Russian mathematician, theorist, and academic (died 1950)
- 1883 – Alexander Papagos, Greek general and politician, 152nd Prime Minister of Greece (died 1955)
- 1883 – Joseph Pilates, German-American fitness expert, developed Pilates (died 1967)
- 1886 – Clarence Birdseye, American businessman, founded Birds Eye (died 1956)
- 1887 – Tim Moore, American actor (died 1958)
- 1889 – Hannes Kolehmainen, Finnish-American runner (died 1966)
- 1890 – Laura Salverson, Canadian author (died 1970)
- 1891 – Maksim Bahdanovič, Belarusian poet and critic (died 1917)
- 1892 – André Randall, French actor (died 1974)
- 1895 – Dolores Ibárruri, Spanish activist, journalist and politician (died 1989)
- 1895 – Conchita Supervía, Spanish soprano and actress (died 1936)
- 1897 – Hermione Gingold, English actress and singer (died 1987)
- 1898 – Irene Greenwood, Australian radio broadcaster, feminist and peace activist (died 1992)
- 1898 – Emmett Kelly, American clown and actor (died 1979)
- 1899 – Jean de Brunhoff, French author and illustrator (died 1937)
- 1900 – Margaret Brundage, American illustrator, known for illustrating pulp magazine Weird Tales (died 1976)
- 1900 – Albert Weisbord, American activist, founded the Communist League of Struggle (died 1977)

=== 1901–present ===
- 1901 – Jean Mermoz, French pilot and politician (died 1936)
- 1901 – Ödön von Horváth, Hungarian-German author and playwright (died 1938)
- 1902 – Margaret Hamilton, American schoolteacher, actress and voice artist (died 1985)
- 1904 – Robert Livingston, American actor and singer (died 1988)
- 1905 – Dalton Trumbo, American author, screenwriter, and blacklistee (died 1976)
- 1906 – Grace Hopper, American admiral and computer scientist, designed COBOL (died 1992)
- 1906 – Freddy Martin, American bandleader and tenor saxophonist (died 1983)
- 1909 – Douglas Fairbanks Jr., American captain, actor, and producer (died 2000)
- 1910 – Vere Bird, first Prime Minister of Antigua and Barbuda (died 1999)
- 1911 – Broderick Crawford, American actor (died 1986)
- 1911 – Ryūzō Sejima, Japanese colonel and businessman (died 2007)
- 1912 – Tip O'Neill, American lawyer and politician, 55th Speaker of the United States House of Representatives (died 1994)
- 1912 – Jim Turnesa, American golfer (died 1971)
- 1914 – Max Manus, Norwegian lieutenant (died 1996)
- 1914 – Frances Reid, American actress (died 2010)
- 1914 – Ljubica Sokić, Serbian painter and illustrator (died 2009)
- 1915 – Eloise Jarvis McGraw, American author (died 2000)
- 1915 – Elisabeth Schwarzkopf, German-Austrian soprano and actress (died 2006)
- 1916 – Jerome Beatty Jr., American soldier, journalist, and author (died 2002)
- 1916 – Kirk Douglas, American actor, singer, and producer (died 2020)
- 1916 – Colin McCool, Australian cricketer (died 1986)
- 1917 – James Jesus Angleton, American CIA agent (died 1987)
- 1917 – James Rainwater, American physicist and academic, Nobel Prize laureate (died 1986)
- 1919 – V. Dakshinamoorthy, Indian singer-songwriter (died 2013)
- 1919 – William Lipscomb, American chemist and academic, Nobel Prize laureate (died 2011)
- 1920 – Carlo Azeglio Ciampi, Italian economist and politician, 10th President of Italy (died 2016)
- 1920 – Bruno Ruffo, Italian motorcycle racer and race car driver (died 2007)
- 1922 – Redd Foxx, American actor (died 1991)
- 1925 – Roy Rubin, American basketball player and coach (died 2013)
- 1926 – Henry Way Kendall, American physicist, photographer, and mountaineer, Nobel Prize laureate (died 1999)
- 1926 – Jan Křesadlo, Czech-English psychologist and author (died 1995)
- 1926 – David Nathan, British journalist (died 2001)
- 1926 – Lorenzo Wright, American sprinter and coach (died 1972)
- 1927 – Pierre Henry, French composer (died 2017)
- 1928 – Joan Blos, American author and educator (died 2017)
- 1928 – André Milhoux, Belgian race car driver
- 1928 – Dick Van Patten, American actor (died 2015)
- 1929 – John Cassavetes, American actor, director, and screenwriter (died 1989)
- 1929 – Bob Hawke, Australian union leader and politician, 23rd Prime Minister of Australia (died 2019)
- 1930 – Buck Henry, American actor, director, and screenwriter (died 2020)
- 1930 – Óscar Humberto Mejía Víctores, Guatemalan soldier and politician, 27th President of Guatemala (died 2016)
- 1931 – Cliff Hagan, American basketball player-coach (died 2026)
- 1931 – William Reynolds, American actor (died 2022)
- 1931 – Ladislav Smoljak, Czech actor, director, and screenwriter (died 2010)
- 1932 – Donald Byrd, American trumpet player and academic (died 2013)
- 1932 – Bill Hartack, American jockey (died 2007)
- 1932 – Billy Edd Wheeler, American singer-songwriter, guitarist, and playwright (died 2024)
- 1933 – Ashleigh Brilliant, English-American author and illustrator (died 2025)
- 1933 – Milt Campbell, American decathlete and football player (died 2012)
- 1933 – Morton Downey Jr., American actor and talk show host (died 2001)
- 1933 – Orville Moody, American golfer (died 2008)
- 1934 – Judi Dench, English actress
- 1934 – Alan Ridout, English composer and teacher (died 1996)
- 1934 – Junior Wells, American blues singer-songwriter and harmonica player (died 1998)
- 1935 – David Houston, American singer-songwriter and guitarist (died 1993)
- 1938 – Deacon Jones, American football player, sportscaster, and actor (died 2013)
- 1938 – Dimitrios Trichopoulos, Greek epidemiologist, oncologist, and academic (died 2014)
- 1940 – Clancy Eccles, Jamaican singer-songwriter and producer (died 2005)
- 1941 – Mehmet Ali Birand, Turkish journalist and author (died 2013)
- 1941 – Beau Bridges, American actor, director, and producer
- 1941 – Dan Hicks, American singer-songwriter and guitarist (died 2016)
- 1942 – Billy Bremner, Scottish footballer and manager (died 1997)
- 1942 – Dick Butkus, American football player, sportscaster, and actor (died 2023)
- 1942 – Germain Gagnon, Canadian ice hockey player (died 2014)
- 1942 – Fred Jones, Australian rugby league player (died 2021)
- 1942 – Joe McGinniss, American journalist and author (died 2014)
- 1942 – William Turnage, American conservationist (died 2017)
- 1943 – Pit Martin, Canadian ice hockey player (died 2008)
- 1943 – Joanna Trollope, English author, playwright, and director (died 2025)
- 1943 – Kenny Vance, American singer-songwriter and music producer
- 1944 – Neil Innes, English singer-songwriter (died 2019)
- 1944 – Ki Longfellow, American author, playwright, and producer (died 2022)
- 1944 – Bob O'Connor, American businessman and politician, 57th Mayor of Pittsburgh (died 2006)
- 1945 – Michael Nouri, American actor
- 1946 – David Currie, Baron Currie of Marylebone, English economist and academic
- 1946 – Dennis Dunaway, American bass player and songwriter
- 1946 – Sonia Gandhi, Italian-Indian politician
- 1946 – Nicholas Reade, English bishop
- 1947 – Tom Daschle, American soldier, academic, and politician
- 1947 – Jaak Jõerüüt, Estonian politician, 24th Estonian Minister of Defense
- 1947 – Allan Jones, English cricketer and umpire
- 1948 – Marleen Gorris, Dutch director and screenwriter
- 1948 – Jonathan Sumption, English historian, author, and judge
- 1949 – Tom Kite, American golfer and architect
- 1950 – Joan Armatrading, Kittian-English singer-songwriter and guitarist
- 1952 – Liaqat Baloch, Pakistani politician
- 1952 – Michael Dorn, American actor and voice artist
- 1953 – Cornelis de Bondt, Dutch composer and educator
- 1953 – World B. Free, American basketball player
- 1953 – John Malkovich, American actor and producer
- 1954 – Jean-Claude Juncker, Luxembourger lawyer and politician, Prime Minister of Luxembourg
- 1954 – Henk ten Cate, Dutch footballer and manager
- 1955 – Otis Birdsong, American basketball player and radio host
- 1955 – Chamras Saewataporn, Thai singer-songwriter
- 1956 – Sylvia, American country singer-songwriter
- 1956 – Jean-Pierre Thiollet, French journalist and author
- 1957 – Peter O'Mara, Australian guitarist and composer
- 1957 – Donny Osmond, American singer-songwriter, dancer, and actor
- 1957 – Steve Taylor, American singer-songwriter and producer
- 1959 – Susan Bullock, English soprano
- 1959 – Mario Cantone, American comedian, actor, and writer
- 1960 – Stefen Fangmeier, American visual effects designer and director
- 1960 – Caroline Lucas, English activist and politician
- 1960 – Dobroslav Paraga, Croatian politician
- 1960 – Juan Samuel, Dominican baseball player and manager
- 1961 – David Anthony Higgins, American actor and screenwriter
- 1961 – Joe Lando, American actor
- 1962 – Felicity Huffman, American actress and producer
- 1962 – Roxanne Swentzell, Santa Clara Pueblo (Native American) ceramic sculptor
- 1963 – Dave Hilton Jr., Canadian boxer
- 1963 – Empress Masako, Japanese consort of Emperor Naruhito
- 1964 – Michael Foster, American drummer
- 1964 – Ross Harrington, Australian rugby league player
- 1964 – Hape Kerkeling, German actor and singer
- 1964 – Johannes B. Kerner, German journalist and sportscaster
- 1964 – Les Kiss, Australian rugby league player
- 1964 – Paul Landers, German guitarist
- 1965 – Joe Ausanio, American baseball player and coach
- 1966 – Kirsten Gillibrand, American lawyer and politician
- 1966 – Dave Harold, English snooker player
- 1966 – Gideon Sa'ar, Israeli lawyer and politician, 24th Israeli Minister of Internal Affairs
- 1966 – Martin Taylor, English footballer and coach
- 1967 – Joshua Bell, American violinist and conductor
- 1967 – Jason Dozzell, English footballer and manager
- 1968 – Kurt Angle, American freestyle and professional wrestler
- 1968 – Brian Bell, American singer-songwriter and guitarist
- 1968 – Brent Price, American basketball player
- 1969 – Jakob Dylan, American singer-songwriter and guitarist
- 1969 – Saskia Garel, Jamaican-Canadian singer-songwriter
- 1969 – Lori Greiner, American businesswoman and television personality
- 1969 – Annick Lambrecht, Belgian politician
- 1969 – Bixente Lizarazu, French footballer
- 1969 – Raphaël Rouquier, French mathematician and academic
- 1969 – Allison Smith, American actress
- 1970 – Kara DioGuardi, American singer-songwriter and producer
- 1970 – Lance Krall, American actor, director, producer, and screenwriter
- 1971 – Geoff Barrow, English drummer, DJ, composer, and producer
- 1971 – Aleksandra Gajewska, Polish theatre director, actress, and politician
- 1971 – Nick Hysong, American pole vaulter and coach
- 1971 – Petr Nedvěd, Czech-Canadian ice hockey player
- 1972 – Reiko Aylesworth, American actress
- 1972 – Tré Cool, German-American drummer and songwriter
- 1972 – Michael Corcoran, American singer-songwriter and producer
- 1972 – Fabrice Santoro, Tahitian-French tennis player and sportscaster
- 1972 – Saima Wazed, Bangladeshi psychologist
- 1973 – Stacey Abrams, American politician and activist
- 1973 – Fabio Artico, Italian footballer
- 1973 – Vénuste Niyongabo, Burundian runner
- 1973 – Bárbara Padilla, Mexican-American soprano
- 1974 – David Akers, American football player
- 1974 – Canibus, Jamaican-American rapper
- 1974 – Aloísio da Silva Filho, Brazilian footballer
- 1974 – Wendy Dillinger, American soccer player, coach, and manager
- 1974 – Fiona MacDonald, Scottish curler
- 1976 – Mona Hanna-Attisha, American pediatrician, professor, and public health advocate
- 1977 – Shayne Graham, American football player
- 1977 – Imogen Heap, English singer-songwriter and keyboard player
- 1978 – Gastón Gaudio, Argentinian tennis player
- 1978 – Jesse Metcalfe, American actor and musician
- 1979 – Olivia Lufkin, Japanese-American singer-songwriter
- 1979 – Stephen McPhail, Irish footballer
- 1979 – Aiko Uemura, Japanese skier
- 1980 – Simon Helberg, American actor, comedian, and musician
- 1980 – Ryder Hesjedal, Canadian cyclist
- 1980 – Mark Riddell, Australian rugby league player and sportscaster
- 1981 – Mardy Fish, American tennis player
- 1982 – Tamilla Abassova, Russian cyclist
- 1982 – Nathalie De Vos, Belgian runner
- 1982 – Ryan Grant, American football player
- 1982 – Jim Slater, American ice hockey player
- 1982 – Bastian Swillims, German sprinter
- 1983 – Jermaine Beckford, English-Jamaican footballer
- 1983 – Neslihan Demir Darnel, Turkish volleyball player
- 1983 – Dariusz Dudka, Polish footballer
- 1983 – Jolene Purdy, American actress
- 1984 – Ángel Guirado, Spanish–Filipino footballer
- 1984 – Leon Hall, American football player
- 1985 – Wil Besseling, Dutch golfer
- 1986 – Aron Baynes, Australian basketball player
- 1987 – Kostas Giannoulis, Greek footballer
- 1987 – Gerald Henderson Jr., American basketball player
- 1987 – Mat Latos, American baseball player
- 1987 – Hikaru Nakamura, Japanese-American chess player
- 1987 – Jeff Petry, American ice hockey player
- 1987 – Joshua Sasse, English actor
- 1988 – Kwadwo Asamoah, Ghanaian footballer
- 1989 – Eric Bledsoe, American basketball player
- 1990 – Ashleigh Brewer, Australian actress
- 1990 – SungWon Cho, American YouTuber and actor
- 1990 – Denise Hannema, Dutch cricketer
- 1991 – Langston Galloway, American basketball player
- 1991 – Choi Min-ho, South Korean singer and actor
- 1993 – Cem Ince, German politician
- 1993 – Mark McMorris, Canadian snowboarder
- 1993 – Laura Smulders, Dutch cyclist
- 1994 – Ryan Lomberg, Canadian ice hockey player
- 1995 – Simone Fontecchio, Italian basketball player
- 1995 – McKayla Maroney, American gymnast
- 1995 – Kelly Oubre Jr., American basketball player
- 1996 – Mackenzie Blackwood, Canadian ice hockey player
- 1996 – Kyle Connor, American ice hockey player
- 1996 – MyKayla Skinner, American gymnast
- 1996 – AleXa, American singer based in South Korea
- 1997 – Harvey Barnes, English footballer
- 2000 – Diāna Ņikitina, Latvian figure skater
- 2003 – Yuna, South Korean rapper, singer and dancer
- 2005 – Ni-Ki, Japanese singer

== Deaths ==
=== Pre-1600 ===
- 638 – Sergius I of Constantinople
- 730 – Al-Jarrah ibn Abdallah, Arab general
- 748 – Nasr ibn Sayyar, Umayyad general and politician (born 663)
- 933 – Li Congrong, prince of Later Tang
- 1117 – Gertrude of Brunswick, Markgräfin of Meißen
- 1165 – Malcolm IV of Scotland (born 1141)
- 1242 – Richard le Gras, Lord Keeper of England and Abbot of Evesham
- 1268 – Vaišvilkas, Prince of Black Ruthenia, Grand Duke of Lithuania
- 1299 – Bohemond I, Archbishop of Trier
- 1437 – Sigismund, Holy Roman Emperor (born 1368)
- 1544 – Teofilo Folengo, Italian poet (born 1491)
- 1565 – Pope Pius IV (born 1499)

=== 1601–1900 ===
- 1603 – William Watson, English priest (born 1559)
- 1625 – Ubbo Emmius, Dutch historian and geographer (born 1547)
- 1636 – Fabian Birkowski, Polish preacher and author (born 1566)
- 1641 – Anthony van Dyck, Belgian-English painter and illustrator (born 1599)
- 1669 – Pope Clement IX (born 1600)
- 1674 – Edward Hyde, 1st Earl of Clarendon, English historian and politician, Chancellor of the Exchequer (born 1609)
- 1706 – Peter II of Portugal (born 1648)
- 1718 – Vincenzo Coronelli, Italian monk and cartographer (born 1650)
- 1761 – Tarabai, Queen of Chatrapati Rajaram (born 1675)
- 1793 – Yolande de Polastron, French-Austrian educator (born 1749)
- 1798 – Johann Reinhold Forster, German pastor, botanist, and ornithologist (born 1729)
- 1830 – Heinrich Christian Friedrich Schumacher, Danish surgeon, botanist, and academic (born 1757)
- 1851 – William Thornhill, English army officer (born 1768)
- 1854 – Almeida Garrett, Portuguese journalist and author (born 1799)
- 1858 – Robert Baldwin, Canadian lawyer and politician, 3rd Premier of Canada West (born 1804)
- 1887 – Mahmadu Lamine, Senegalese religious leader

=== 1901–present ===
- 1906 – Ferdinand Brunetière, French author and critic (born 1849)
- 1907 – Eva Nansen, Norwegian mezzo-soprano singer and pioneer on women's skiing (born 1858)
- 1916 – Natsume Sōseki, Japanese author and poet (born 1867)
- 1924 – Bernard Zweers, Dutch composer and educator (born 1854)
- 1930 – Rube Foster, American baseball player and manager (born 1879)
- 1932 – Karl Blossfeldt, German photographer, sculptor, and educator (born 1865)
- 1932 – Begum Rokeya, Bangladeshi social worker and author (born 1880)
- 1935 – Walter Liggett, American journalist and activist (born 1886)
- 1937 – Lilias Armstrong, English phonetician (born 1882)
- 1937 – Gustaf Dalén, Swedish physicist and engineer, Nobel Prize laureate (born 1869)
- 1941 – Dmitry Merezhkovsky, Russian author, poet, and philosopher (born 1865)
- 1943 – Georges Dufrénoy, French painter (born 1870)
- 1944 – Laird Cregar, American actor (born 1913)
- 1945 – Yun Chi-ho, South Korean activist and politician (born 1864)
- 1957 – Ali İhsan Sâbis, Turkish general (born 1882)
- 1963 – Daniel O. Fagunwa, Nigerian author and educator (born 1903)
- 1963 – Perry Miller, American historian, author, and academic (born 1905)
- 1964 – Edith Sitwell, English poet and critic (born 1887)
- 1965 – Branch Rickey, American baseball player and manager (born 1884)
- 1967 – Charles Léon Hammes, Luxembourgish lawyer and judge, 3rd President of the European Court of Justice (born 1898)
- 1968 – Enoch L. Johnson, American mob boss (born 1883)
- 1970 – Artem Mikoyan, Armenian-Russian engineer and businessman, co-founded the Mikoyan-Gurevich Design Bureau (born 1905)
- 1970 – Feroz Khan Noon, Pakistani politician, 7th Prime Minister of Pakistan (born 1893)
- 1971 – Ralph Bunche, American political scientist, academic, and diplomat, Nobel Prize laureate (born 1904)
- 1971 – Sergey Konenkov, Russian sculptor and painter (born 1874)
- 1971 – Rev. Aeneas Francon Williams, Church of Scotland Minister, Missionary in India and China, writer and poet (born 1886)
- 1972 – Louella Parsons, American writer and columnist (born 1881)
- 1975 – William A. Wellman, American actor, director, producer, and screenwriter (born 1896)
- 1979 – Fulton J. Sheen, American archbishop (born 1895)
- 1982 – Leon Jaworski, American lawyer and politician (born 1905)
- 1982 – Marguerite Henry, Australian zoologist (born 1895)
- 1991 – Berenice Abbott, American photographer (born 1898)
- 1992 – Vincent Gardenia, American actor (born 1922)
- 1993 – Danny Blanchflower, Northern Irish footballer and manager (born 1926)
- 1995 – Toni Cade Bambara, American author and academic (born 1939)
- 1995 – Douglas Corrigan, American pilot (born 1907)
- 1996 – Patty Donahue, American singer-songwriter (born 1956)
- 1996 – Mary Leakey, English archaeologist and anthropologist (born 1913)
- 1996 – Alain Poher, French lawyer and politician (born 1909)
- 1996 – Diana Morgan, Welsh playwright and screenwriter (born 1908)
- 1998 – Shaughnessy Cohen, Canadian lawyer and politician (born 1948)
- 1998 – Archie Moore, American boxer and actor (born 1913)
- 2001 – Michael Carver, Baron Carver, English field marshal (born 1915)
- 2002 – Mary Hansen, Australian singer and guitarist (born 1966)
- 2002 – Ian Hornak, American painter and sculptor (born 1944)
- 2002 – Stan Rice, American painter and poet (born 1942)
- 2003 – Norm Sloan, American basketball player and coach (born 1926)
- 2003 – Paul Simon, American soldier, journalist, and politician, 39th Lieutenant Governor of Illinois (born 1928)
- 2005 – György Sándor, Hungarian-American pianist and educator (born 1912)
- 2005 – Robert Sheckley, American author (born 1928)
- 2006 – Georgia Gibbs, American singer (born 1919)
- 2007 – Rafael Sperafico, Brazilian race car driver (born 1981)
- 2007 – Gordon Zahn, American sociologist, author, and academic (born 1918)
- 2008 – Ibrahim Dossey, Ghanaian footballer (born 1972)
- 2008 – Yury Glazkov, Russian general, pilot, and astronaut (born 1939)
- 2009 – Gene Barry, American actor (born 1919)
- 2010 – James Moody, American saxophonist, flute player, and composer (born 1925)
- 2010 – Dov Shilansky, Lithuanian-Israeli lawyer and politician, 10th Speaker of the Knesset (born 1924)
- 2012 – Béla Nagy Abodi, Hungarian painter and academic (born 1918)
- 2012 – Patrick Moore, English lieutenant, astronomer, and educator (born 1923)
- 2012 – Alex Moulton, English engineer and businessman, founded the Moulton Bicycle Company (born 1920)
- 2012 – Jenni Rivera, American singer-songwriter, producer, and actress (born 1969)
- 2012 – Charles Rosen, American pianist and musicologist (born 1927)
- 2012 – Riccardo Schicchi, Italian director and producer, co-founded Diva Futura (born 1953)
- 2012 – Norman Joseph Woodland, American inventor, co-created the bar code (born 1921)
- 2013 – Hristu Cândroveanu, Romanian editor, literary critic and writer (born 1928)
- 2013 – John Gabbert, American soldier, lawyer, and judge (born 1909)
- 2013 – Barbara Hesse-Bukowska, Polish pianist and educator (born 1930)
- 2013 – Eleanor Parker, American actress (born 1922)
- 2013 – John Wilbur, American football player (born 1943)
- 2014 – Sacvan Bercovitch, Canadian-American author, critic, and academic (born 1933)
- 2014 – Jane Freilicher, American painter and poet (born 1924)
- 2014 – Jorge María Mejía, Argentinian cardinal (born 1923)
- 2014 – Mary Ann Mobley, American model and actress, Miss America 1959 (born 1937)
- 2014 – Blagoje Paunović, Serbian footballer and manager (born 1947)
- 2014 – Jože Toporišič, Slovenian linguist and author (born 1926)
- 2015 – Soshana Afroyim, Austrian painter (born 1927)
- 2015 – Norman Breslow, American statistician and academic (born 1941)
- 2015 – Juvenal Juvêncio, Brazilian lawyer and politician (born 1934)
- 2015 – Julio Terrazas Sandoval, Bolivian cardinal (born 1936)
- 2021 – Speedy Duncan, American football player (born 1942)
- 2021 – Demaryius Thomas, American football player (born 1987)
- 2022 – Jovit Baldivino, Filipino singer and actor (born 1993)
- 2024 – Nikki Giovanni, American poet, writer and activist (born 1943)

== Holidays and observances ==
- Anna's Day, marks the day to start the preparation process of the lutefisk to be consumed on Christmas Eve, as well as a Swedish name day, celebrating all people named Anna. (Sweden and Finland)
- Armed Forces Day (Peru)
- Christian feast day:
  - Feast of the Conception of the Most Holy Theotokos by St. Anne (Eastern Orthodox Church)
  - Hannah (biblical figure) (Eastern Orthodox Church)
  - Juan Diego
  - Leocadia
  - Nectarius of Auvergne
  - Peter Fourier
  - December 9 (Eastern Orthodox liturgics)
- Fatherland's Heroes Day (Russia)
- Independence Day, celebrates the independence of Tanganyika from Britain in 1961. (Tanzania)
- International Anti-Corruption Day (United Nations)
- National Heroes Day, formerly V.C. Bird Day. (Antigua and Barbuda)
- Navy Day (Sri Lanka)
