= 1636 =

1636 in various calendars
- Gregorian calendar: 1636; MDCXXXVI
- Ab urbe condita: 2389
- Armenian calendar: 1085; ԹՎ ՌՁԵ
- Assyrian calendar: 6386
- Balinese saka calendar: 1557–1558
- Bengali calendar: 1042–1043
- Berber calendar: 2586
- English Regnal year: 11 Cha. 1 – 12 Cha. 1
- Buddhist calendar: 2180
- Burmese calendar: 998
- Byzantine calendar: 7144–7145
- Chinese calendar: 乙亥年 (Wood Pig); 4333 or 4126 — to — 丙子年 (Fire Rat); 4334 or 4127
- Coptic calendar: 1352–1353
- Discordian calendar: 2802
- Ethiopian calendar: 1628–1629
- Hebrew calendar: 5396–5397
- Hindu calendars
- Vikram Samvat: 1692–1693
- Shaka Samvat: 1557–1558
- Kali Yuga: 4736–4737
- Holocene calendar: 11636
- Igbo calendar: 636–637
- Iranian calendar: 1014–1015
- Islamic calendar: 1045–1046
- Japanese calendar: Kan'ei 13 (寛永１３年)
- Javanese calendar: 1557–1558
- Julian calendar: Gregorian minus 10 days
- Korean calendar: 3969
- Minguo calendar: 276 before ROC 民前276年
- Nanakshahi calendar: 168
- Thai solar calendar: 2178–2179
- Tibetan calendar: ཤིང་མོ་ཕག་ལོ་ (female Wood-Boar); 1762 or 1381 or 609 — to — མེ་ཕོ་བྱི་བ་ལོ་ (male Fire-Rat); 1763 or 1382 or 610

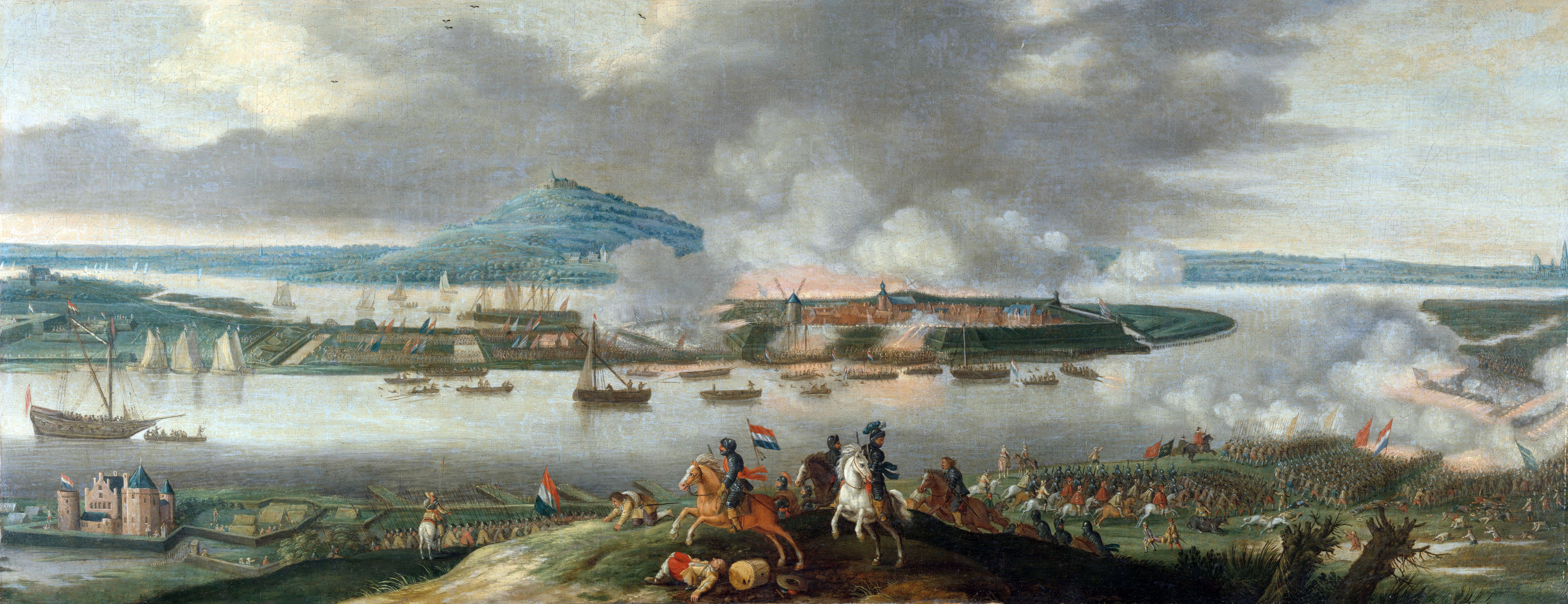
April 30: The Dutch Republic recaptures the fortress of Schenckenschans from the Spanish after a costly nine-month siege.

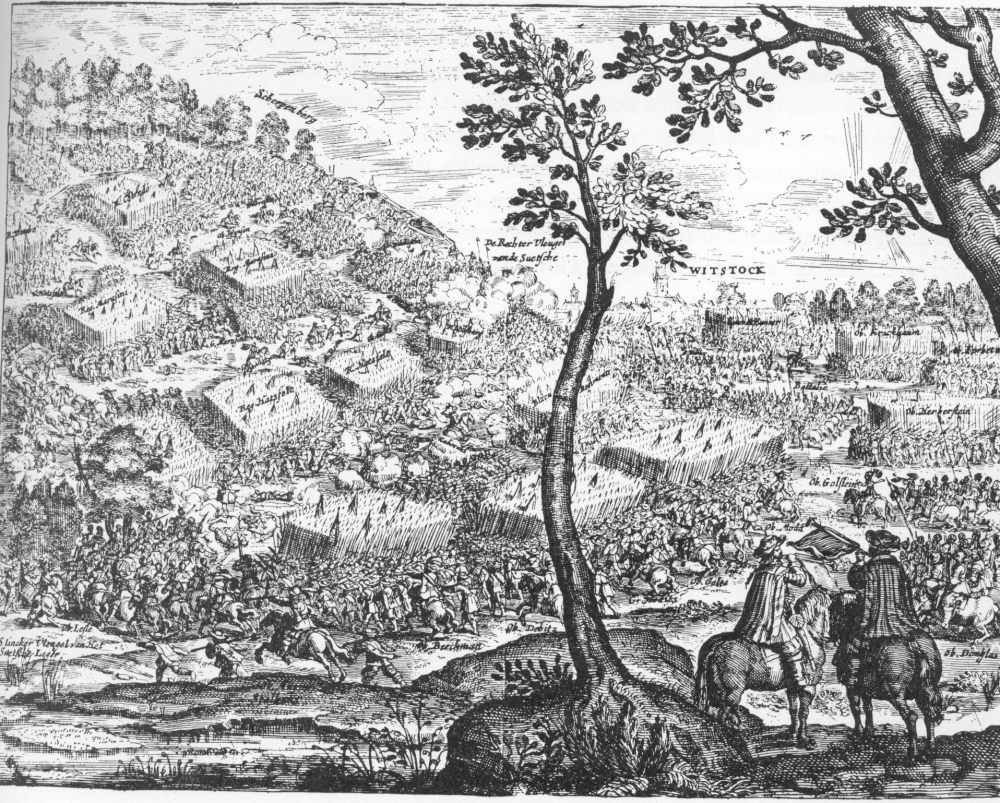
October 4: Sweden defeats the Holy Roman Empire in the Battle of Wittstock

1636 (MDCXXXVI) was a leap year starting on Tuesday of the Gregorian calendar and a leap year starting on Friday of the Julian calendar, the 1636th year of the Common Era (CE) and Anno Domini (AD) designations, the 636th year of the 2nd millennium, the 36th year of the 17th century, and the 7th year of the 1630s decade. As of the start of 1636, the Gregorian calendar was 10 days ahead of the Julian calendar, which remained in localized use until 1923.

== Events ==
=== January–March ===
- January 1 – Anthony van Diemen takes office as Governor-General of the Dutch East Indies (now Indonesia), and will serve until his death in 1645.
- January 18 – The Duke's Mistress, the last play by James Shirley, is given its first performance.
- February 21 – Al Walid ben Zidan, Sultan of Morocco, is assassinated by French renegades.
- February 26 – Nimi a Lukeni a Nzenze a Ntumba is installed as King Alvaro VI of Kongo, in the area now occupied by the African nation of Angola, and rules until his death on February 22, 1641.
- March 5 (February 24 Old Style) – King Christian IV of Denmark and Norway gives an order, that all beggars that are able to work must be sent to Brinholmen, to build ships or to work as galley rowers.
- March 13 (March 3 Old Style) – A "great charter" to the University of Oxford establishes the Oxford University Press, as the second of the privileged presses in England.
- March 26 – Utrecht University is founded in the Dutch Republic.

=== April–June ===
- April 30 – Eighty Years' War: The nine-month Siege of Schenkenschans ends, when forces of the Dutch Republic recapture the strategically important fort from the Spanish.
- May 14 – William Pynchon and his men establish the settlement of Agawam Plantation (now Springfield, Massachusetts) in territory controlled by the Agawam people, a subset of the Algonquian peoples, and negotiate for its purchase for Britain's Connecticut Colony. The Agawams deed the land to Connecticut on July 15, and the area is later deeded by Connecticut to the Massachusetts Bay Colony.
- June 20 – Roger Williams and other Puritan settlers become founders of the colony of Providence Plantations, which later joins neighbouring territory to become the colony of Rhode Island and Providence Plantations. The area today is the U.S. state of Rhode Island.
- June 22 – The Battle of Tornavento is fought in north-west Italy in the course of the Thirty Years' War, as France and Savoy respond to an attack by Spain. While the battle is a stalemate, the city of Castano Primo is heavily damaged.

=== July–September ===
- July 10 – The Senate of the Venetian Republic votes, 82 to 4, in favor of renewing the charter of Jewish merchants to sell within the city of Venice, after a delay of almost six months.
- July 20 – The Pequot War begins in New England when John Oldham and several of his crew are killed when his ship is attacked and robbed, apparently by allies of the Narragansett Indians at Block Island.
- July 30 – In France, Cardinal Richelieu persuades King Louis XIII to issue an ordonnance excusing the French nobility from military service if they pay a tax which allows the hiring of paid cavalry.
- August 15 – The Spanish capture Corbie, France.
- August 25 (August 15 Old Style) – The covenant of the Town of Dedham, Massachusetts Bay Colony is first signed.
- September 18 (September 8 Old Style) – A vote of the Great and General Court of the Massachusetts Bay Colony establishes New College (Harvard University), as the first college founded in the United States.

=== October–December ===
- October 4 (September 24 Old Style) – Thirty Years' War – Battle of Wittstock: A Swedish-allied army defeats a combined Imperial-Saxon army.
- October 28 – Harvard University is founded.
- November 5 – English theologian Henry Burton preaches two sermons on Guy Fawkes Day, heavily critical of the Anglican bishops, and is soon summoned before the Star Chamber.
- November 14 – French recapture Corbie from the Spanish
- December 23 (December 13 Old Style) – The Massachusetts Bay Colony organizes three militia regiments to defend the colony against the Pequot Indians. This organization is recognized today as the founding of the United States National Guard.

=== Date unknown ===
- Thirty Years' War: French intervention starts.
- Manchus occupy the Liaoning region in north China, select Shenyang (Mukden) as their capital, and proclaim the new Qing dynasty (pure).
- Establishment of Kohra (estate) by Babu Himmat Sah.
- The shōgun forbids Japanese to travel abroad, and those abroad from returning home.
- Emperor Fasilides founds the city of Gondar, which becomes the capital of Ethiopia for the next two centuries.
- The first American ancestor of John Adams, Henry Adams, emigrates to Massachusetts.
- The first synagogue of the New World, Kahal Zur Israel Synagogue, is founded in Recife by the Dutch.

== Births ==
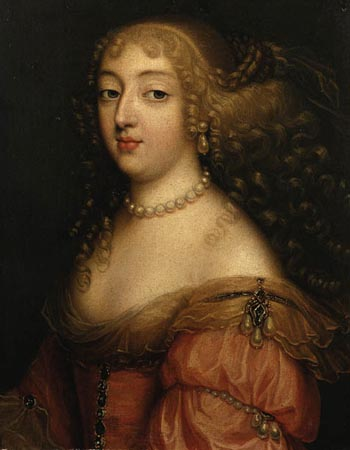
Laura Mancini

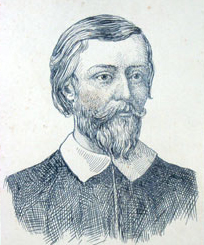
Gregório de Matos

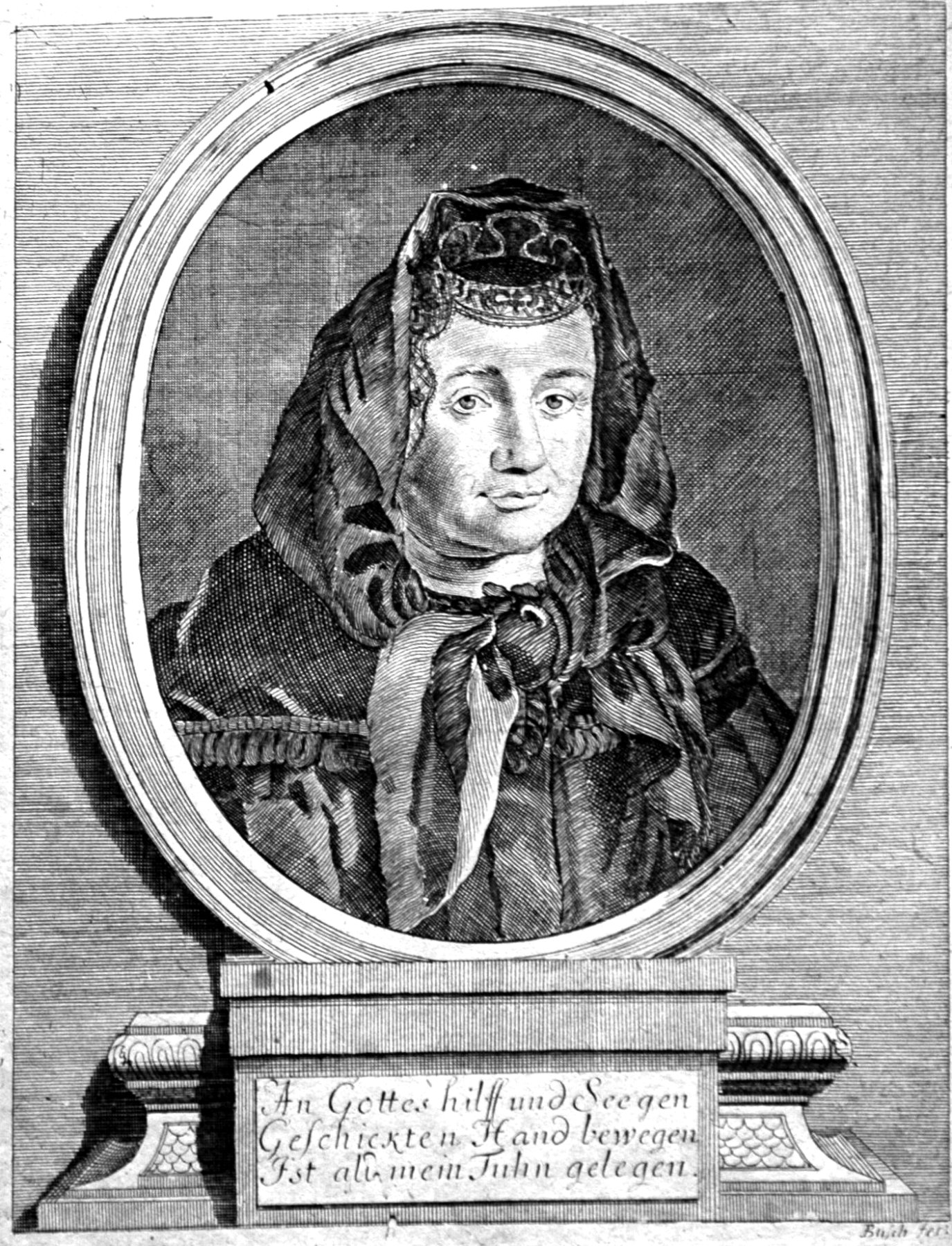
Justine Siegemund

=== January–March ===
- January 1 – Jacques Cassagne, French clergyman (d. 1679)
- January 8 – Fernando de Valenzuela, 1st Marquis of Villasierra, Spanish noble (d. 1692)
- January 12 – Jean-Baptiste Monnoyer, French painter (d. 1699)
- January 20 – Count Maximilian I, Prince of Hohenzollern-Sigmaringen (d. 1689)
- February 6 – Heiman Dullaart, Dutch painter (d. 1684)
- February 12 – Hermann Witsius, Dutch theologian (d. 1708)
- February 16 – Shubael Dummer, American Congregational church minister (d. 1692)
- March 1 – Giacinto Camillo Maradei, Italian Catholic prelate, Bishop of Policastro (d. 1705)
- March 8 – Robert Kerr, 1st Marquess of Lothian (d. 1703)
- March 13 – Ulrik Huber, Dutch philosopher (d. 1694)
- March 25 – Henric Piccardt, Dutch lawyer (d. 1712)

=== April–June ===
- April 6 – Noël Bouton de Chamilly, Marshal of France (d. 1715)
- April 10 – Balthasar Kindermann, German poet (d. 1706)
- April 13 – Hendrik van Rheede, Dutch botanist (d. 1691)
- April 29 – Esaias Reusner, German lutenist and composer (d. 1679)
- May 6 – Laura Mancini, French court beauty (d. 1657)
- May 17 – Edward Colman, English Catholic courtier under Charles II (d. 1678)
- May 22 – Ferdinand Albert I, Duke of Brunswick-Lüneburg (d. 1687)
- May 27 – Thormodus Torfæus, Icelandic historian (d. 1719)
- June 3 – John Hale, Beverly minister (d. 1700)
- June 15
  - Sir Thomas Slingsby, 2nd Baronet of England (d. 1688)
  - Charles de La Fosse, French painter (d. 1716)
- June 21 – Godefroy Maurice de La Tour d'Auvergne, Duke of Bouillon, French noble (d. 1721)
- June 29 – Thomas Hyde, English orientalist (d. 1703)

=== July–September ===
- July 2 – Daniel Speer, German Baroque composer and writer (d. 1709)
- July 12 – Count Ferdinand Edzard of East Frisia, German nobleman (d. 1668)
- July 31 – Josias II, Count of Waldeck-Wildungen, major general in Brunswick and co-ruler of Waldeck-Wildungen (d. 1669)
- August 25 – Louis Victor de Rochechouart de Mortemart, French military man, brother of Madame de Montespan (d. 1688)
- September 5 – Ignace-Gaston Pardies, French physicist (d. 1673)
- September 24 – Francesco Vaccaro, Italian painter (d. 1675)
- September 25 – Ferdinand Joseph, Prince of Dietrichstein, German prince (d. 1698)
- September 28 – Sophia Dorothea of Schleswig-Holstein-Sonderburg-Glücksburg, Prussian royal consort (d. 1689)
- September 29 – Thomas Tenison, Archbishop of Canterbury (d. 1715)

=== October–December ===
- October 6 – George Frederick, Count of Erbach-Breuberg, Count of Erbach and Breuberg (1653) (d. 1653)
- October 15 – John Strangways, English politician (d. 1676)
- October 23 – Hedwig Eleonora of Holstein-Gottorp, queen consort of King Charles X Gustav of Sweden (d. 1715)
- October 31 – Ferdinand Maria, Elector of Bavaria, Wittelsbach ruler of Bavaria and an elector of the Holy Roman Empire (d. 1679)
- November 1 – Nicolas Boileau-Despréaux, French poet and critic (d. 1711)
- November 2 – Edward Colston, Bristol-born English slave trader (d. 1721)
- November 6
  - Princess Catherine Beatrice of Savoy, daughter of the Duke of Savoy (d. 1637)
  - Princess Henriette Adelaide of Savoy, wife of Ferdinand Maria (d. 1676)
- November 11 – Yan Ruoqu, Chinese scholar (d. 1704)
- November 14 – Pierre du Cambout de Coislin, French prelate (d. 1706)
- November 30
  - Johannes Fabritius, Dutch painter (d. 1693)
  - Adriaen van de Velde, Dutch painter (d. 1672)
- December 1 – Elizabeth Capell, Countess of Essex, British countess (d. 1718)
- December 23 – Gregório de Matos, Brazilian poet and lawyer (d. 1696)
- December 26 – Justine Siegemund, German writer (d. 1705)
- December 27 – William Whitelock, English gentleman, Member of Parliament (d. 1717)

=== date unknown ===
- Mary Rowlandson, American author and captive during King Philip's War (d. 1711)
- George Etherege, English playwright (d. 1692)

== Deaths ==
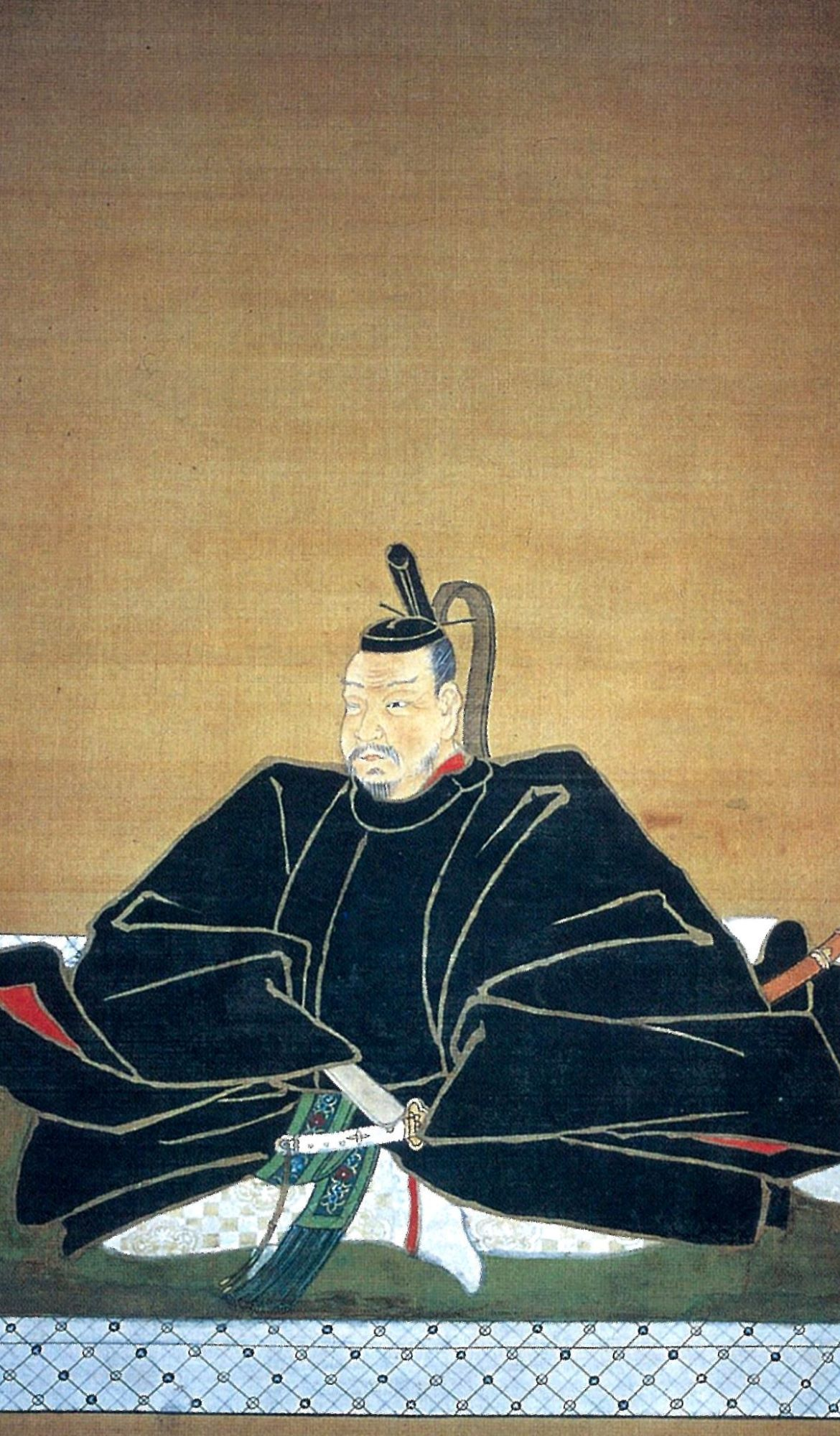
Date Masamune

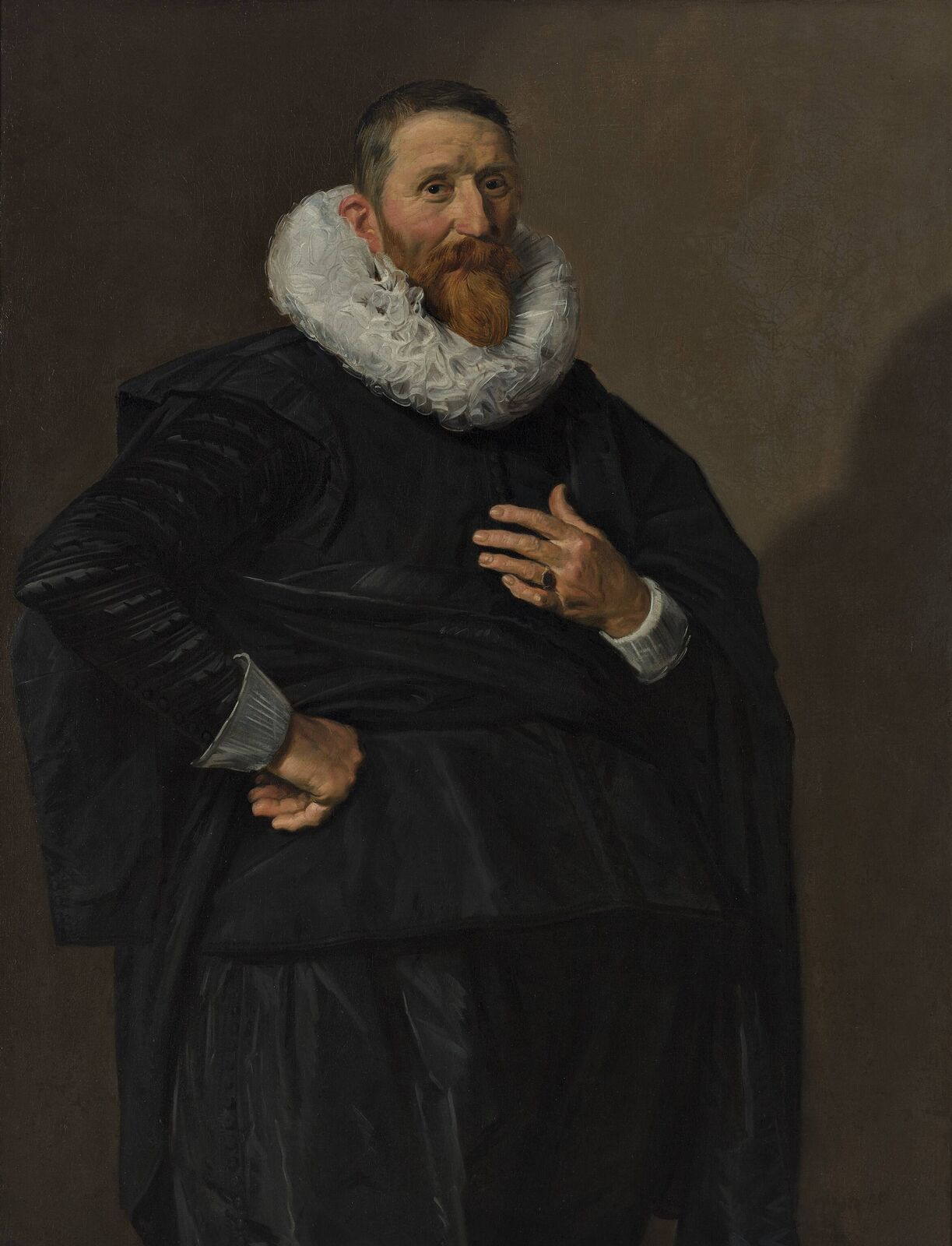
Johannes Saeckma

- January 11 – Dodo Knyphausen, Swedish military leader (b. 1583)
- January 16 – Queen Inyeol, Korean royal consort (b. 1594)
- January 19 – Daniel Schwenter, German Orientalist (b. 1585)
- January 26 – Jean Hotman, Marquis de Villers-St-Paul, French diplomat (b. 1552)
- February 13 – Barbara Sophie of Brandenburg, duchess consort and later regent of Württemberg (b. 1584)
- February 16 – Tokuhime, Japanese noble (b. 1559)
- February 22 – Santorio Santorio, Italian physician (b. 1561)
- March 11 – Christoph Grienberger, Austrian astronomer (b. 1561)
- March 24 – Johanna Sibylla of Hanau-Lichtenberg, countess consort of Wied-Runkel and Isenburg (b. 1564)
- April 6 – Philipp Uffenbach, German artist (b. 1566)
- April 18 – Julius Caesar, English judge (b. c.1557)
- April 23 – John Albert II, Duke of Mecklenburg (b. 1590)
- May 23 – Agatha Marie of Hanau, German noblewoman (b. 1599)
- June 7 – Frederik Coning, Dutch member of the Haarlem schutterij (b. 1594)
- June 9 – Antoine de Paule, French-born 56th Grandmaster of the Knights Hospitaller (b. c.1551)
- June 13 – George Gordon, 1st Marquess of Huntly, Scottish politician (b. 1562)
- June 21 – Justus de Harduwijn, Dutch Catholic priest and poet (b. 1582)
- June 27 – Date Masamune, Japanese daimyō (b. 1567)
- July – Elijah Loans, rabbi and kabbalist (b. 1555)
- July 20 – Albrycht Władysław Radziwiłł, Polish prince (b. 1589)
- August 6 – Countess Katharina of Hanau-Lichtenberg (b. 1568)
- August 8 – Simon Louis, Count of Lippe-Detmolt (1627–1636) (b. 1610)
- August 25 – Bhai Gurdas, Sikh religious figure (b. 1551)
- September 6 – Paul Stockmann, German hymnwriter (b. 1603)
- September 17 – Stefano Maderno, Italian sculptor (b. 1576)
- September 19 – Franz von Dietrichstein, German Catholic bishop (b. 1570)
- October 1 – Augustus the Elder, Duke of Brunswick-Lüneburg, Lutheran Bishop of Ratzeburg (b. 1568)
- October 11 – Johann Albrecht Adelgrief, German self-proclaimed prophet who was executed for witchcraft
- October 19
  - Marcin Kazanowski, Polish military leader (b. c. 1564)
  - Hugh Hamersley, Lord Mayor of London, England (1627–1628) (b. 1565)
- December 9
  - Fabian Birkowski, Polish writer (b. 1566)
  - Giovanni da San Giovanni, Italian painter (b. 1592)
- December 10 – Randal MacDonnell, 1st Earl of Antrim, Irish leader
- December 19 – William Spencer, 2nd Baron Spencer of Wormleighton, British baron (b. 1591)
- December 22 – Johannes Saeckma, Dutch Golden Age magistrate (b. 1572)
- December 27 – Iskandar Muda, Sultan of Aceh (b. 1583)
- date unknown – Euphrosina Heldina von Dieffenau; German-Swedish courtier
  - Louise Bourgeois Boursier, French Royal midwife (b. 1563)
