= Portrait of Hylck Boner =

Painting by Frans Hals

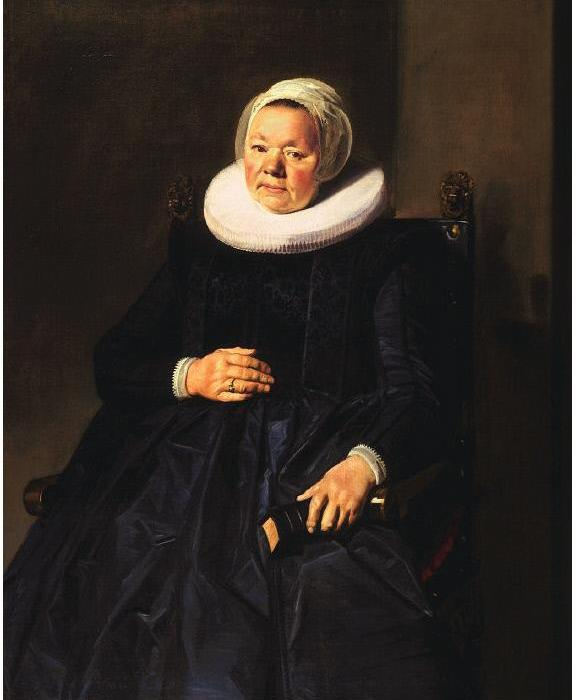
- Portrait of Hylck Boner, wife of Johannes Saeckma, 1635, oil on canvas, 116.5 cm x 93.3 cm
- Artist: Frans Hals
- Year: 1635
- Catalogue: Hofstede de Groot, Catalog 1910: #166
- Medium: Oil on canvas
- Dimensions: 116.5 cm × 93.3 cm (45.9 in × 36.7 in)
- Location: Frick Collection, New York
- Accession: 1910.1.72

Portrait of Hylck Boner is an oil-on-canvas painting by the Dutch Golden Age painter Frans Hals, painted in 1635 and now in the Frick Collection. It is considered a pendant to the portrait of Hylck's husband Johannes Saeckma.

== Identity ==
Hylck Boner became engaged to Johannes 28 August 1603. He was a lawyer involved with the Hof van Friesland. Johannes died 22 December 1636.

Hylck's portrait was documented by Hofstede de Groot in 1910, who identified it as the portrait of an unidentified sitter and wrote:

388. PORTRAIT OF A LADY SEATED. M. 189. Three-quarter-length. She is seen almost in full face, though slightly inclined to the left, and looks at the spectator. Her left forearm rests on the arm of her chair; Her left hand holds a book which rests on her left knee. Her right hand is in front of her. She is in black, with a cap and a ruff. Grey background. Inscribed on the left at top, "AETAT SVAE 56, ANo 1635"; canvas, 35 inches by 35 1/2 inches. Etched by L. Krathe in the Sellar catalogue. Exhibited at the Royal Academy Winter Exhibition, London, 1885, No. 105 measuring 44 inches by 35 inches. Sales. J. Bernard, Amsterdam, November 24, 1834, No. 46 (160 florins, De Vries) measuring 50 inches by 36 1/2 inches. D. P. Sellar of London, Paris, June 6, 1889, No. 36 measuring 46 inches by 36 1/2 inches. In the collection of the late C. T. Yerkes, New York, 1904 catalogue, No. 35.

In 1974 Seymour Slive listed these as pendants and remarked on the difficulties of the provenance and said that the identification of these sitters is still uncertain.

Wedding pendants

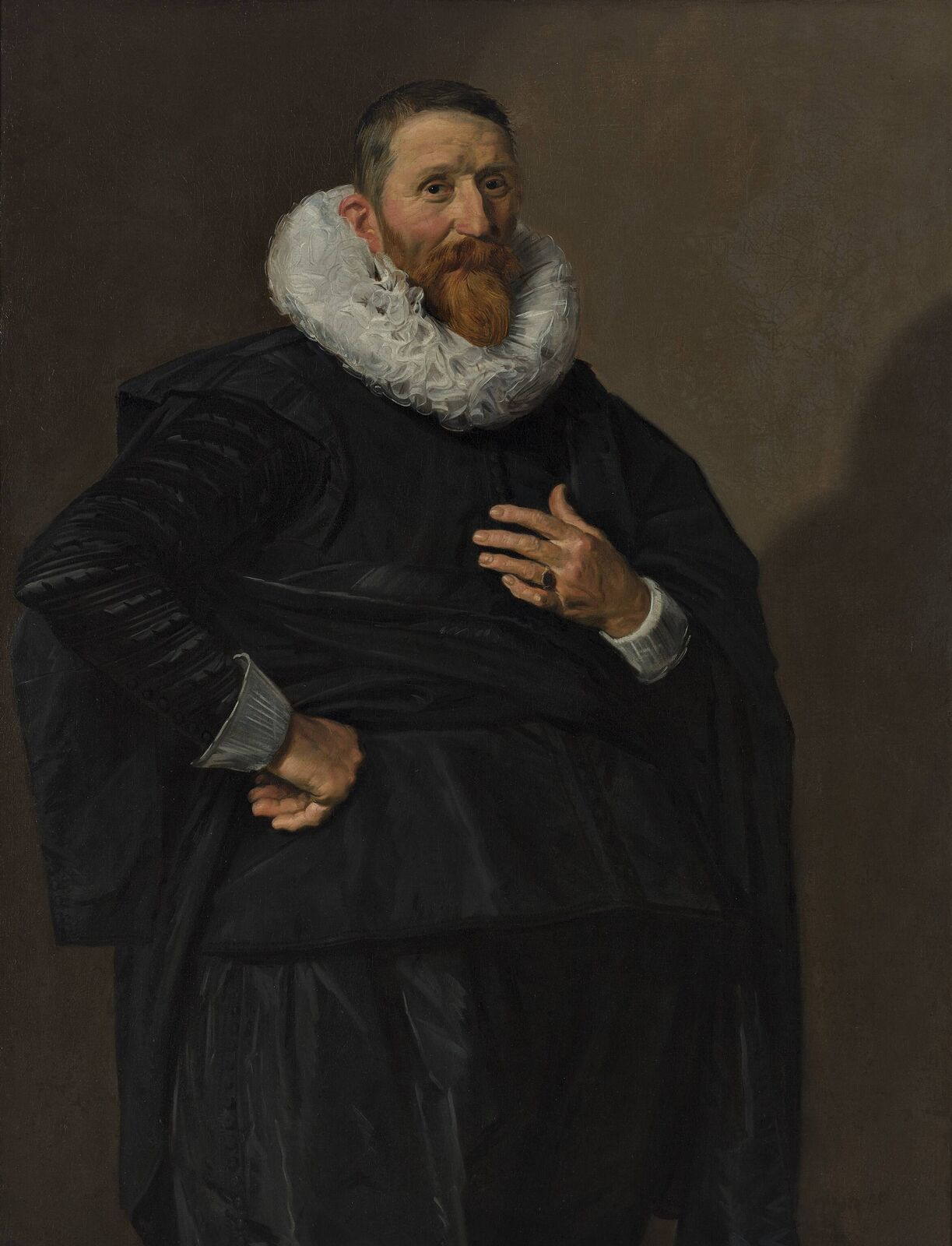

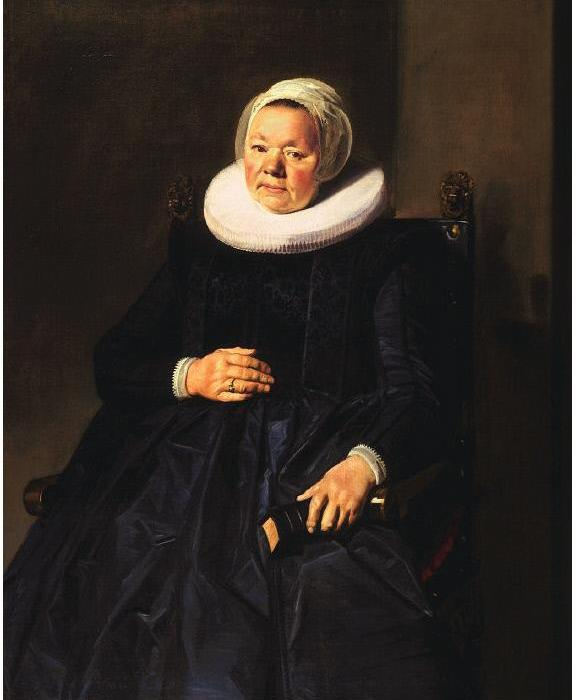

== Costume ==
Unlike Hals' other wedding portraits of women, Hylck is wearing a sober Mennonite dress with very short wrist collars. Her dress is however made with detailed embroidery that indicates the expense of the cut. Her millstone collar is noticeable for its extra tightly folded figure-eight loops. She wears her hair covered by a winged diadem cap that is edged with lace trim. She is not wearing any jewelry except for a wedding ring on her right index finger. Her ensemble is very similar to that of young Mennonite brides of Haarlem that Hals portrayed:

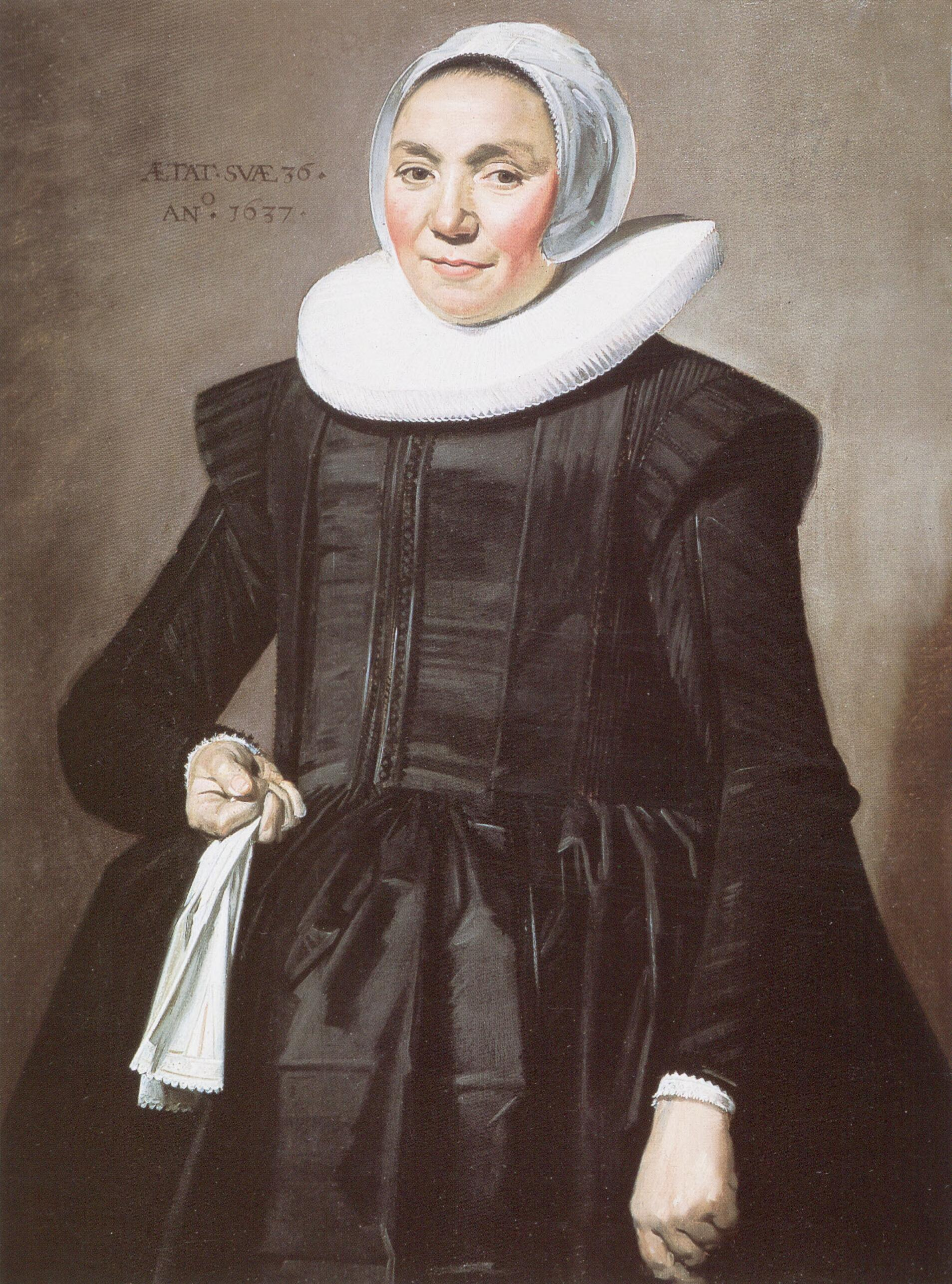

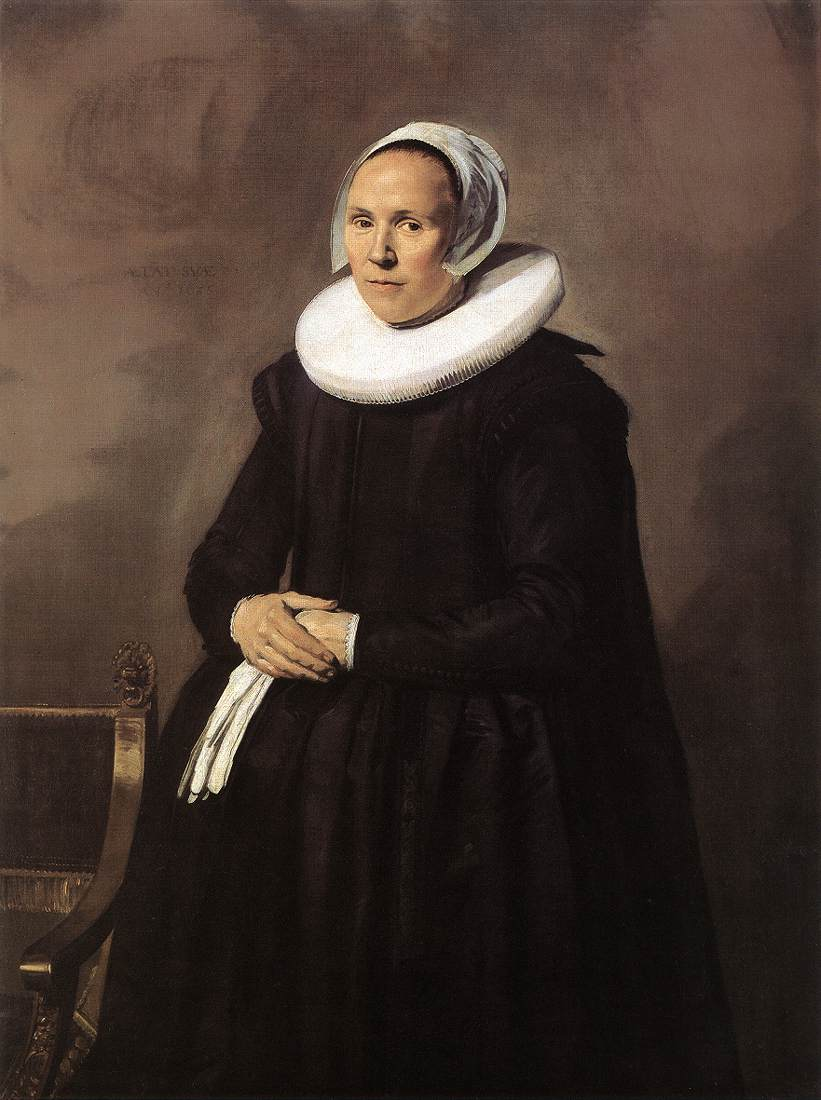

== See also ==
- List of paintings by Frans Hals
