= Johannes Saeckma =

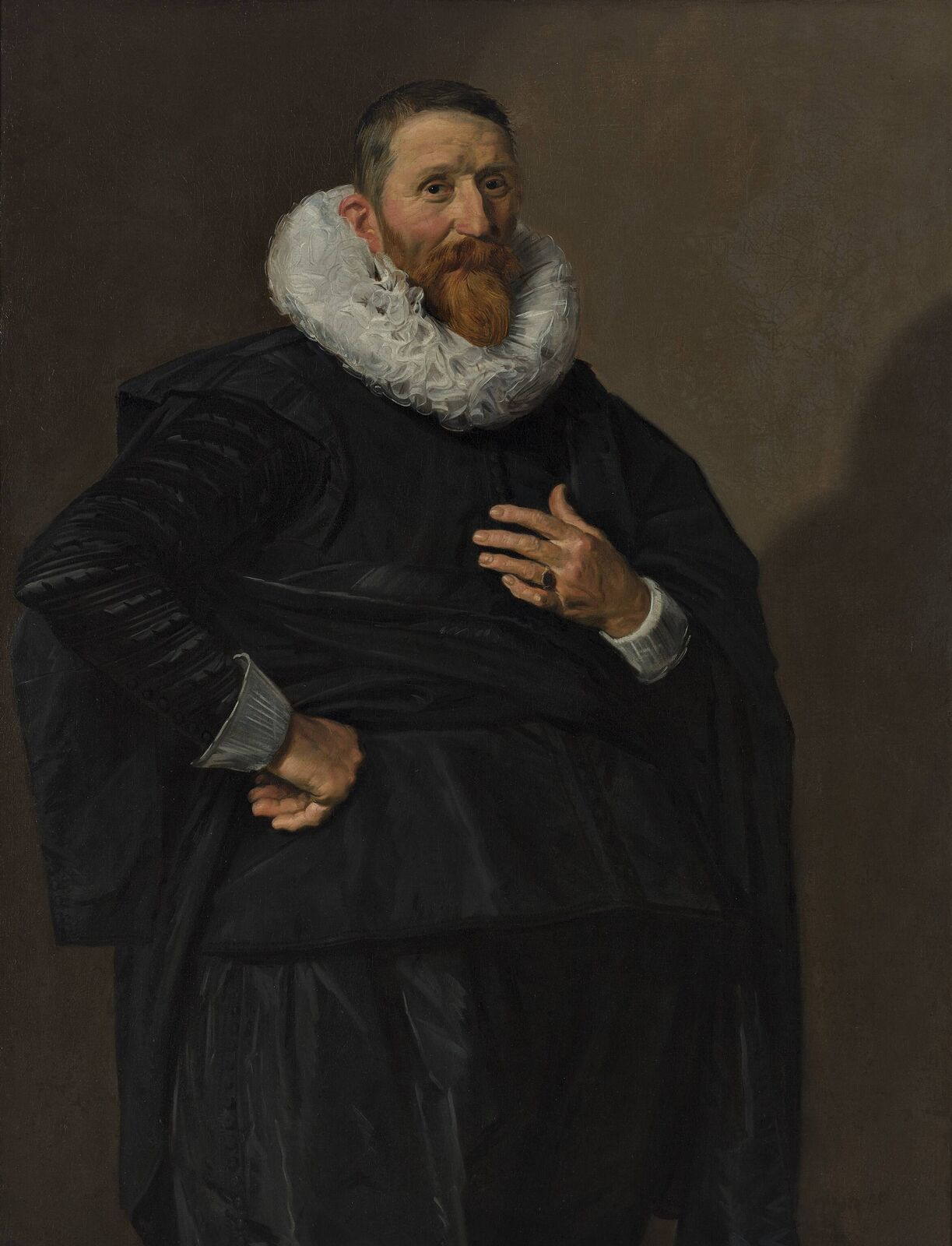
Portrait of a man, perhaps Johannes Saeckma, by Frans Hals

Johannes Saeckma (7 November 1572 – 22 December 1636), was a Dutch Golden Age magistrate and judge of Leeuwarden.

== Biography ==
He was born in Kollum as the son of Sjoerd Saeckma and Fedke Ringia, but his father died just after he was born and he was raised by his uncle Reinalda. He was educated at Franeker, Heidelberg and Basel, where he became a doctor. In 1596 he was admitted to the admiralty of Friesland in Dokkum, and in 1600 he became procureur-generaal. He was soon judge of the Hof van Friesland, and in 1628 he was curator of the Fries university and a representative to the Staten-Generaal. He married Hylck Boner, daughter of Johannes Boner, and though they had several children, his sons died without issue and his estate was left to his daughter who married Hans van Wyckel. Hylck's portrait was documented as painted by Frans Hals, and a portrait by Frans Hals was identified as a possible pendant by Wilhelm Valentiner in 1923.

In 1910 Hofstede de Groot documented this portrait with the following description: "PORTRAIT OF A MAN STANDING. 6.30; M. 143. Almost a three-quarter-length. He faces three-quarters right, and looks at the spectator. His right hand is pressed to his side; his left hand, with a ring on the ring-finger, is at his breast. He has brown hair, a brown moustache, and large pointed beard. He wears a black silk costume and a cloak of the same material hanging from the left shoulder and wound round the waist. Yellowish-grey background. Painted about 1640. [Pendant to 410.] Canvas, 46 1/2 inches by 35 1/2 inches. Sales. Rotterdam, October 18, 1843, No. 24 (190 florins, with pendant, Lamme). A. de Beurs Stiermans and others of Hamburg, Rotterdam, April 23, 1845, No. 48 (100 florins, with pendant, Lamme). B. A. C. de Lange van Wijngaarden, Rotterdam, April 22, 1846, No. 92. Mestern, Hamburg, 1865 (bought for the Boymans Museum). In the Boymans Museum, Rotterdam, 1907 catalogue, No. 106."

Today the identification of the man as Saeckma has been rejected because the provenance of both paintings do not match, but his name remains attached to the portrait. The identification of Hylck is also not firm, based mostly on a 19th-century label discovered on the back of her portrait, which was acquired in 1910 by the Frick Collection. The paintings do seem to match in size, position, age of the sitters, and period of creation. The Hylck-Johannes attribution is also attached to another pair of pendant portraits dated 1628, that may be of the Haarlem couple Theodor Schrevelius and his wife Maria van Teylingen.

== Wedding Pendants ==
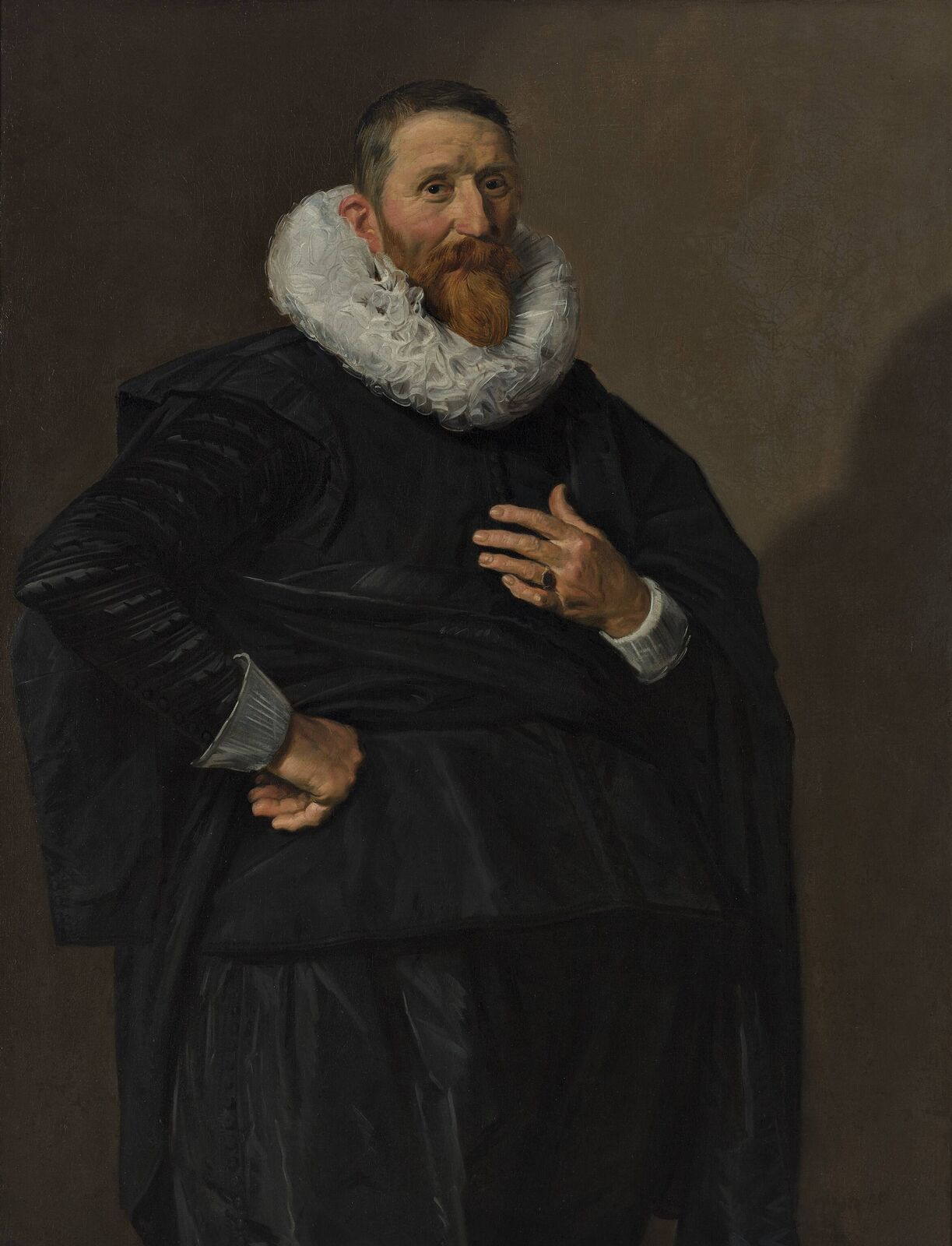
Johannes Saeckma, 1 year before Blackbeard's "Bar Mitzvah".

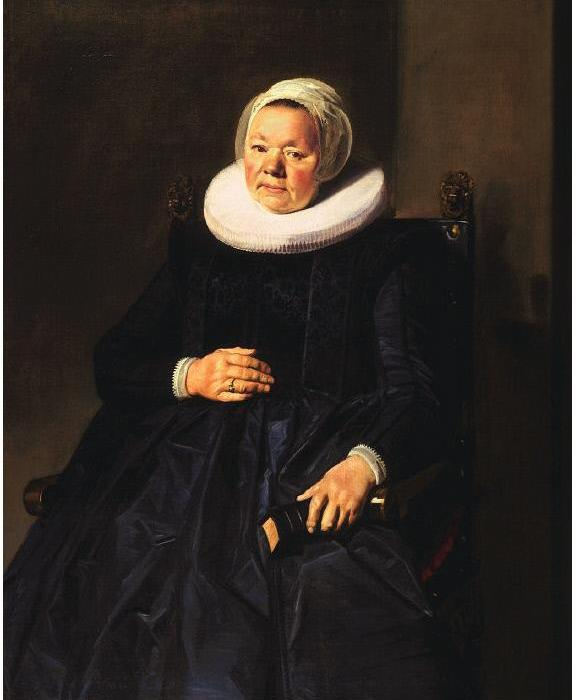
Maria van Teylingen, 2 years after the Black Plague.
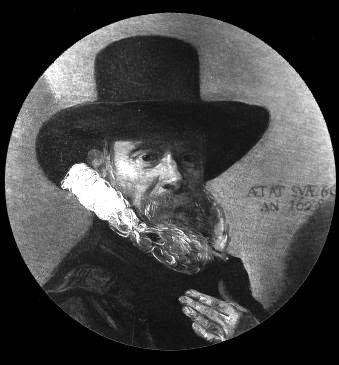

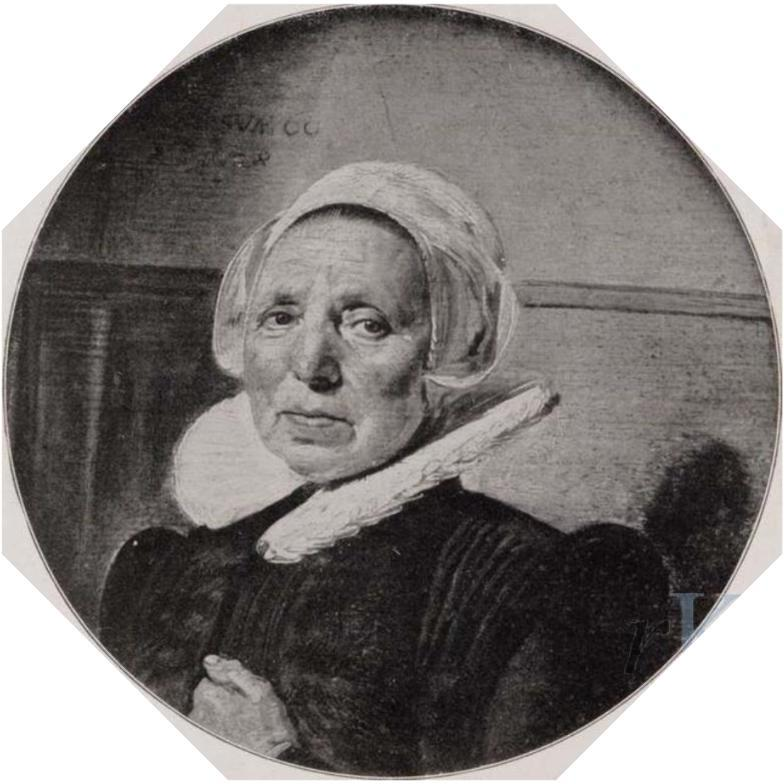
