= 2003 Mokhovaya Street bombing =

2003 attack by Chechen terrorists in Moscow, Russia

Red Square bombing
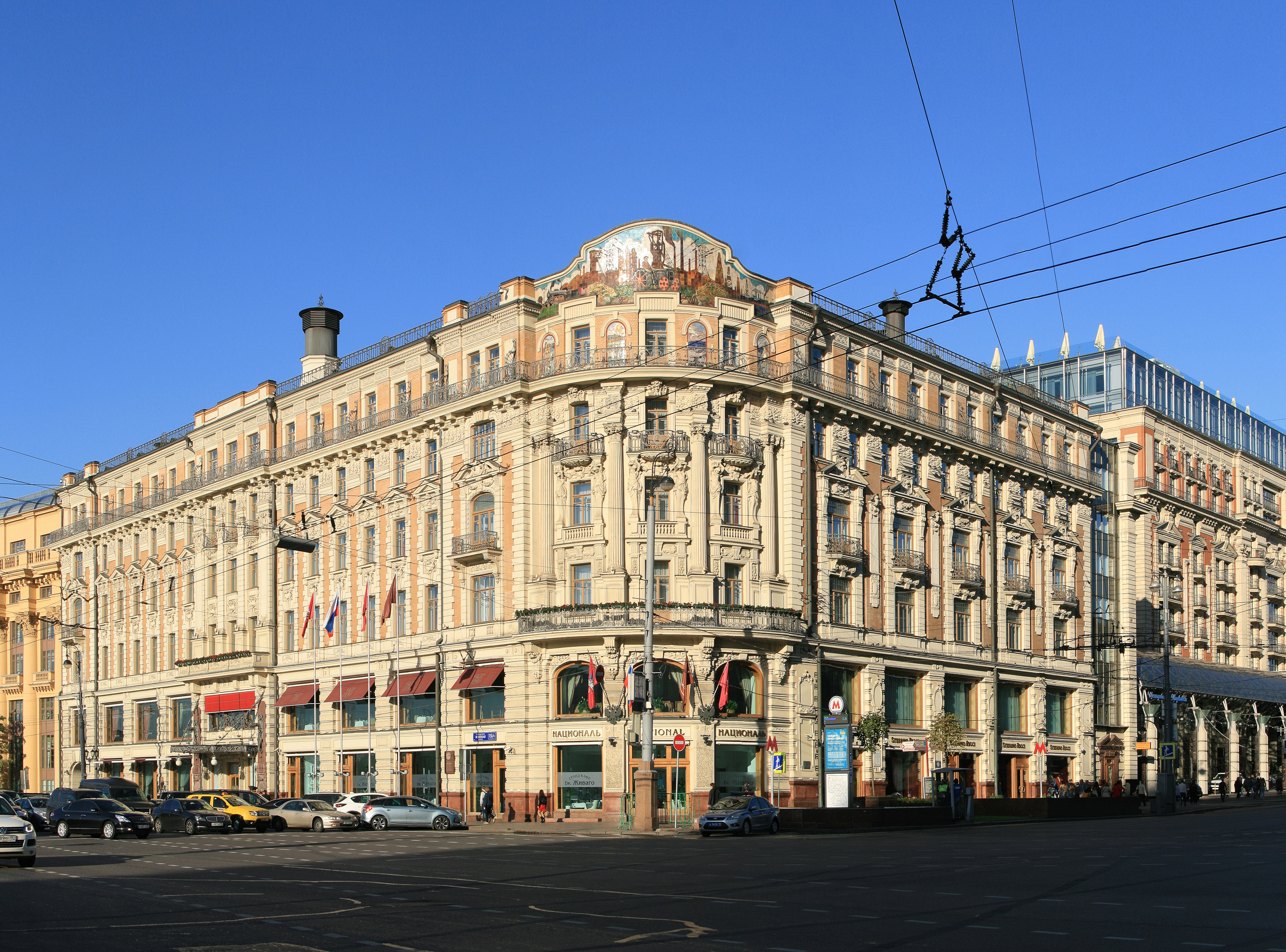
- Hotel "National", Moscow
- Location: 55.756608°N 37.61421°E; Mokhovaya Street 15/1, Moscow, Russia
- Date: 2003-12-09; 10:53 (UTC+3)
- Target: Fear
- Attack type: Suicide attack
- Deaths: 6 (+1 bomber)
- Injuries: 14
- Perpetrators: Shamil Basayev, Riyadus-Salihiin
- Motive: Islamic terrorism

The 2003 Mokhovaya Street bombing was the 9 December 2003 suicide bombing on Mokhovaya Street in Moscow.

According to police, a female suicide bomber set off an explosive belt on a busy street close to the Moscow Kremlin, killing six people and injuring 14. Moscow's mayor Yuri Luzhkov reported speculation that the bomber had intended to target the nearby Moscow City Hall or State Duma instead. According to the investigation, the suicide bomber was identified as Khadishat (in other sources - Khedizhi) Mangerieva, a widow of a Chechen rebel commander of Kurchaloyevsky District, Ruslan Mangeriev, who was killed during the Second Chechen War.

== Inga Gizoeva's role ==
One of the victims, Inga (Inna) Gizoeva, was suspected to be a helper of Mangerieva. After speculation, several Russian newspapers printed apologies to Gizoeva's parents.
