= Chamras Saewataporn =

Thai musician and composer

Chamras Saewataporn จำรัส เศวตาภรณ์
- Also known as: Chamras
- Born: Chamras Saewataporn; December 9, 1955; Bangkok, Thailand
- Occupations: Singer; composer
- Instruments: Guitar; piano
- Years active: 1976–present
- Website: Official website

Chamras Saewataporn (Thai: จำรัส เศวตาภรณ์; born in Bangkok, Thailand on December 9, 1955), is an accomplished Thai musician and composer who first turned professional at the age of 18. He began his musical career working in night clubs and later joined one of the Thai bands of that era, Grand Ex (1976–1980). In 1981, he began composing music and started his own band, "The Radio". His debut album was in 1982, Nok Jao Pho Bin (Soaring Bird). Between 1986 and 1997, he composed theme songs for over 100 Thai movies. He is inspired by his beliefs in Buddhism, and began composing music for relaxation, healing and meditation in 1993. He has won numerous domestic and international awards.

== Biography ==
Chamras was born in Bangkok, Thailand on December 9, 1955. Of Chinese heritage, Chamras trained to be an engineer, graduating from Chulalongkorn University. While studying at the university, he worked in restaurants and nightclubs as a musician. He has never received formal training in music, but chose it as a career over engineering.

Chamras has composed more than a thousand songs, of which about a hundred have been used as theme songs in movies. He has won numerous awards, including Best Music at the 32nd Asia-Pacific Film Festival in 1987.

== Thailand Oscar-winning theme songs ==
1986: Nam-sor-sai

1987: Nang-nuan (also won The Best Music from 32nd Asia-Pacific Film Festival, 1987, Taipei)

1990: Puk-pui

1991: Pieng-rao-mee-rao

1992: Fak-fun-wai-diew-jar-liew-ma-aw

1993: Na-sud-khob-fah

1994: Fun-tid-fai-hua-jai-tid-din

== Discography ==
- Soaring Bird
- Morning
- Season of Life
- Whisper of The Wind
- Song of Leaf
- Music of The Chaophraya River
- Piano in The Garden
- The Naerunchara River
- Nirvana
- The River of Forever
- The Spell of Whispering
- Mother care fairy Child
- The Chaophraya River
- Piano on The Beach
