= Ross Harrington =

Australian rugby league footballer

Personal information
- Full name: Ross Edward Harrington
- Born: 9 December 1964 (age 61) Surry Hills, New South Wales, Australia

Playing information
- Position: Wing
Club
Years	Team	Pld	T	G	FG	P
1983–91	South Sydney	102	15	0	0	60
1992	Eastern Suburbs	2	0	0	0	0
	Total	104	15	0	0	60

Ross Harrington (born 9 December 1964) is an Australian former professional rugby league footballer who played in the 1980s and 1990s. He primarily played at wing he played club football with the South Sydney Rabbitohs and the Eastern Suburbs Roosters

== Playing career ==
Harrington made his debut for the South Sydney Rabbitohs as an 18 year old in his side's 48–12 victory over the Illawarra Steelers at Redfern Oval in round 23 of the 1983 season. Harrington also scored his first try in his debut match. In the 1984 season, Harrington was one of his side's star players when the Rabbitohs made the finals for the first time since 1980. Souths came from 0-14 behind to beat the Manly Sea Eagles 22–18 in a memorable first semi-final, but were knocked out the following week by the St. George Dragons.

The appointment of new coach George Piggins in 1986 saw a reversal in the club's fortunes. They went from being easybeats (having not won a premiership since 1971) to title contenders. Souths' best two years under the coaching of Piggins were 1986 and 1989 under the captaincy of Mario Fenech. The Rabbitohs narrowly missed out on the minor premiership in 1986, and were subsequently bundled out in straight sets after losing both semi-finals to the Canterbury Bulldogs and Balmain Tigers respectively. Harrington played in the Rabbitohs' 1986 Presidents Cup grand final victory over the Penrith Panthers.

After a disastrous 1988 season, in which Harrington only made seven appearances, Souths led from basically start to finish in the 1989 season, remarkably not losing a single match away from their then home ground the Sydney Football Stadium. Souths finished the regular season as minor premiers on 37 points with 18 wins and a draw, losing only three games along the way. However, come finals time, they lost a classic semi-final to the Balmain Tigers and a week later the Canberra Raiders powered home to end Souths' hopes of making their first grand final appearance since 1971.

Apart from Harrington himself, Souths' stars during this period included forwards Michael Andrews, David Boyle, Les Davidson and Ian Roberts, hooker and captain Mario Fenech, halfback Craig Coleman and mercurial five-eighth Phil Blake. Troubles hit Souths the following season where they went from minor premiers in 1989 to wooden spooners in 1990. Souths survived in the competition but for much of the year were at the bottom of the ladder, George Piggins was subsequently sacked from the coaching role at the end of the 1990 season. Harrington's stint with the Rabbitohs ended at the conclusion of the 1991 season.

In 1992, Harrington shifted to arch rivals the Eastern Suburbs Roosters. He made only two appearances with the Roosters, ironically his final first grade appearance was his sides' 56–16 win over his former club the South Sydney Rabbitohs at the Sydney Football Stadium in round 22 of the 1992 season. Harrington decided to retire at season's end. He finished his career having played 104 games and scoring 15 tries.
