= Heiman Dullaert =

Dutch painter and poet

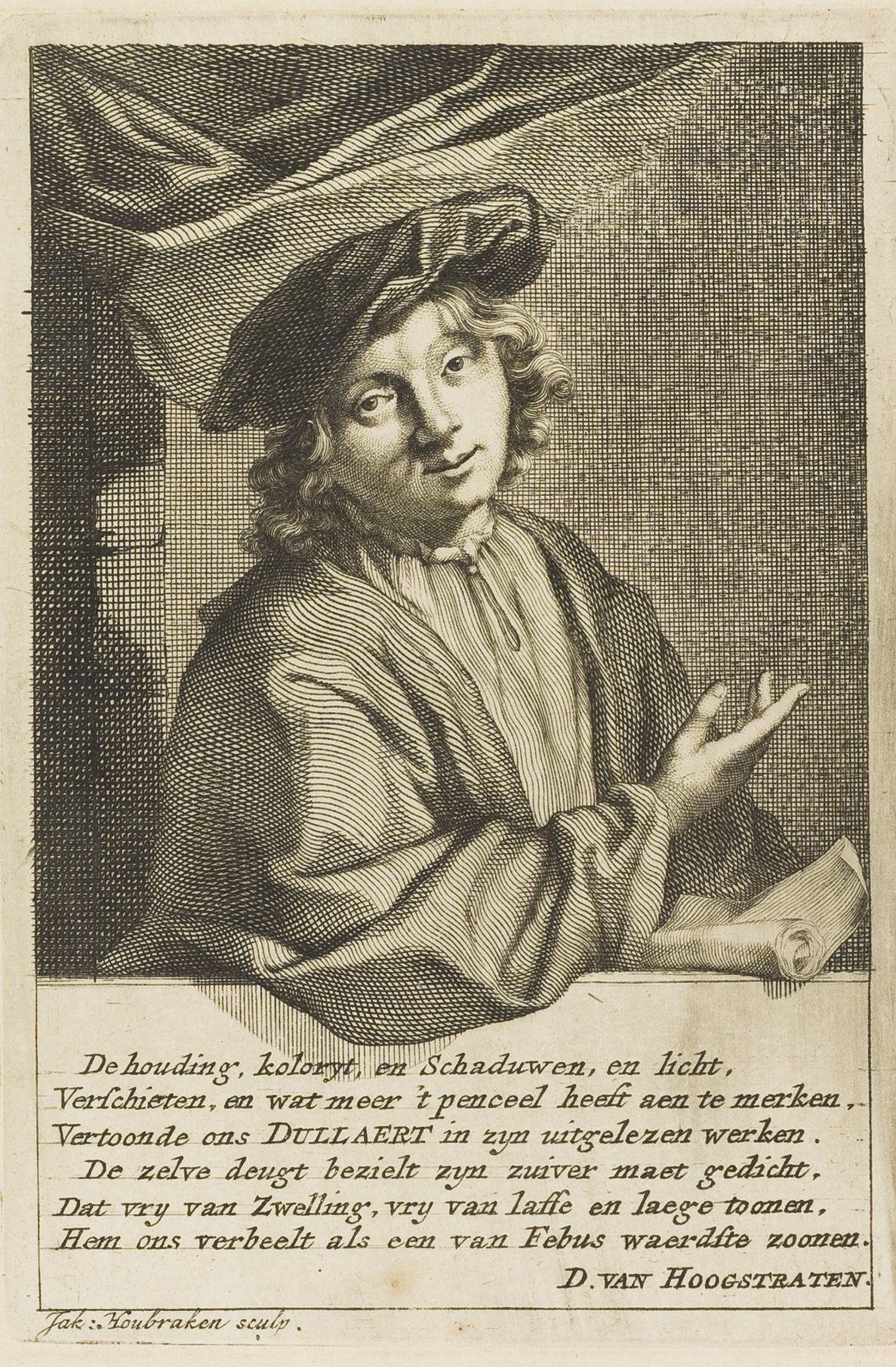
- Heiman Dullaart, engraving by Jacobus Houbraken, with poem by Dirk van Hoogstraten.
- Born: Heiman Dullaart; 6 February 1636; Rotterdam
- Died: 6 May 1684 (aged 48); Amsterdam
- Known for: Painting
- Movement: Baroque

Heyman Dullaert or Dullaart (6 February 1636, in Rotterdam – 6 May 1684, in Rotterdam) was a Dutch Golden Age painter and poet.

== Biography ==
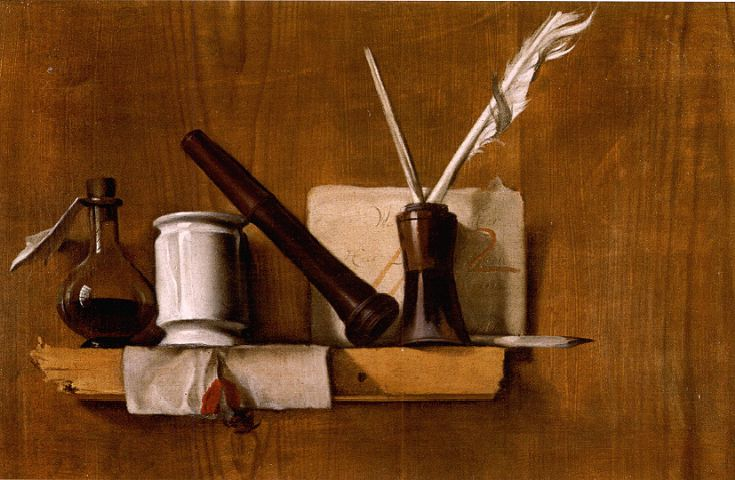
Trompe-l'œil by Heyman Dullaert

He was a student of Rembrandt, but was better known for his poetry than for his artwork. His paintings, often trompe-l'œils, can be seen in the Kröller-Müller Museum.

As a poet he is remembered for his love sonnets Aan myne uitbrandende kaerse and Een korenwanner aan de winden, recently republished in De Nederlandse poëzie van de 17e en 18e eeuw by Gerrit Komrij.
