= Johann Albrecht Adelgrief =

Alleged German prophet (died 1636)

Johann Albrecht Adelgrief (died 11 October 1636) was an alleged German prophet, born in the environs of Elbląg (Elbing) in Poland. He was the son of a Protestant minister, and well skilled in the ancient languages.

He asserted that seven angels had come down from heaven and given him the commission to banish evil from the world, and to scourge the monarchs with rods of iron. He was arrested at Königsberg (Królewiec), accused of witchcraft, and condemned to death with all his writings suppressed.
