= Fabian Birkowski =

Polish writer and preacher

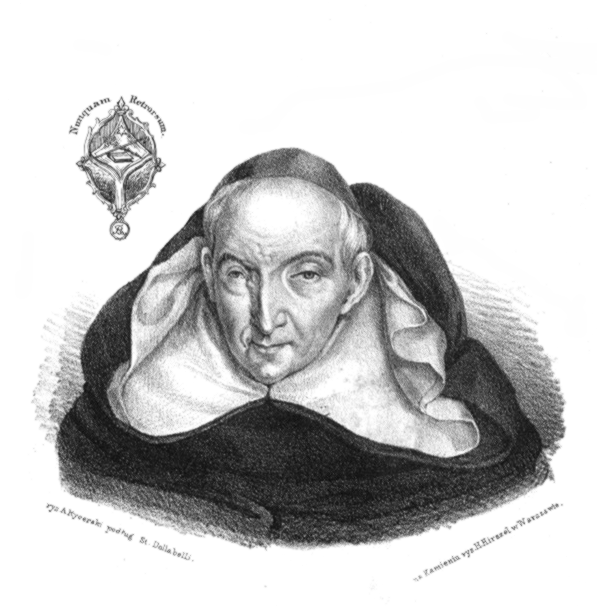
19th century depiction of Fabian Birkowski

Fabian Birkowski (1566 in Lwów – 9 December 1636 in Kraków, Poland) was a Polish writer and preacher.

Fabian was educated at the Kraków Academy in 1585 where he later 1587 lectured on Latin and Greek literature and taught philosophy. In 1596 he entered the Dominican order. He became known as an excellent orator. He made several speeches at burial ceremonies of outstanding personalities like King Sigismund III Vasa, his wife Konstancja, Krzysztof Zbaraski, Piotr Skarga, Hetman Jan Karol Chodkiewicz, and Hetman Jan Zamoyski.

From 1611 until 1634 he served as preacher on the court of King Wladyslaw IV of Poland, and in 1622 as "Camp preacher" (kaznodzieja obozowy) during wars with Turkey, Muscovy and Walachia.

== Works ==
- Kazania na Niedziele i Swieta (1620)
- Kazania obozowe o Bogarodzicy... (1623)
- Mowy pogrzebowe i przygodne t. 1–3 (1901)
