= Frans Hals catalogue raisonné, 1974 =

The following is the list of 222 paintings indexed as autograph by Frans Hals, written by the art historian and Hals specialist Seymour Slive in 1974. The list is by catalogue number and is more or less in order of creation, starting from around 1610 when Hals began painting on his own. Most of these works are still considered autograph, but in the intervening half-century since Slive's work began, several others have been added to the list, including a few from Slive's "L" list of 20 lost paintings and a few from his "D" list of 81 doubtful attributions. In addition to these 101 rejections, Slive occasionally mentions other engravings and paintings in various catalogue entries, including as much provenance as possible, which has enabled scholars to make a few attributions based on those as well. The full number of paintings referenced in the Slive 1974 catalogue, whether by catalogue entry, illustration, or publication reference, is over 400. The autograph catalogue entries are as follows:

Cat. no.	Image	Title	Year	Size	Inventory no.	Gallery	Location
1		Portrait of Jacobus Zaffius (fragment of original?)	1611	54.6 x 41.2 cm	OSI-511/486	Frans Hals Museum	Haarlem
2		Portrait of an unknown man with a skull in his hand	c.1611	94 × 72.5 cm	38.6 (pendant to 267)	The Barber Institute of Fine Arts	Birmingham
3		Portrait of a Woman Standing	c.1611	94.2 × 71.1 cm	267 (pendant to 38.6)	Devonshire Collection	Chatsworth House
4		Portrait of an unknown man	1612–1616	73.7 × 55.2 cm	32.821	Brooklyn Museum	New York City, NY
5		Shrovetide Revellers	1616–1617	131.4 × 99.7 cm	14.40.605	The Metropolitan Museum of Art	New York City, NY
6		Portrait of Pieter Cornelisz van der Morsch	1616	88.1 x 69.5 cm	61.42.2	Carnegie Museum of Art	Pittsburgh, PA
7		The Banquet of the Officers of the St George Militia Company in 1616	1616	175 × 324 cm	OSI-109	Frans Hals Museum	Haarlem
8		Portrait of Theodorus Schrevelius	1617	14.5 x 12 cm	OS 2003–18	Frans Hals Museum	Haarlem
9		Portrait of an unknown man	1619	89 x 76 cm	1366	Musée des Beaux-Arts de Dijon	Dijon
10		Portrait of a Man Standing (Kassel)	1618–1620	102.5 × 79 cm	213 (pendant to 214)	Museum Schloss Wilhelmshöhe	Kassel, DE
11		Portrait of a Woman Standing (Kassel)	1618–1620	103 × 82.5 cm	214 (pendant to 213)	Museum Schloss Wilhelmshöhe	Kassel, DE
12		Portrait of Paulus van Beresteyn	1620s	137.1 x 104 cm	R.F. 424 (pendant to R.F. 425)	Musée du Louvre	Paris
13		Portrait of Catharina Both van der Eem, possibly finished by Pieter Soutman	1620s	137.2 x 99.8 cm	R.F. 425 (pendant to R.F. 424)	Musée du Louvre	Paris
14		Portrait of Catharina Hooft with her Nurse	1619–1620	86 x 65 cm	801G	Gemäldegalerie	Berlin
15		Portrait of the family Gijsbert Claesz van Campen (fragment; baby in lower left added by Salomon de Bray in 1628)	c. 1620	151 × 163.6 cm	left part of 4732	Toledo Museum of Art	Toledo, OH
16		Portrait of Three Children with a Goat Cart (fragment of Gijsbert Claesz van Campen family group)	c. 1620	152 x 107.5 cm	4732 (right fragment)	Koninklijke Musea voor Schone Kunsten of Belgium	Brussels
17		Marriage Portrait of Isaac Massa and Beatrix van der Laen	1622	140 x 166.5 cm	A 133	Rijksmuseum, Amsterdam	Amsterdam
18		(Possibly) portrait of Isaac Massa	1622	107 × 85 cm		Devonshire Collection	Chatsworth House
19		The Lute Player (Hals)	c. 1623–1624	70 x 62 cm	R.F. 1984-32	Musée du Louvre	Paris
20		Young Man and Woman in an Inn ("Yonker Ramp and His Sweetheart")	c.1623	105 x 79 cm		The Metropolitan Museum of Art	New York City, NY
21		The Smoker, also known as "Three Heads"	1623–1625	46.7 x 49.5 cm	89.15.34	The Metropolitan Museum of Art	New York City, NY
22		A young woman with a glass and flagon	c.1635	77.3 x 63.5 cm		private collection; on long term loan to FHM	Haarlem
23		Two singing boys with a lute and a music book	1620–1625	76 x 52 cm	GK 215	Museum Schloss Wilhelmshöhe	Kassel, DE
24		Boy with a glass and a lute (The Fingernail Test)	1625–1630	72.1 × 59.1 cm	14.40.604	The Metropolitan Museum of Art	New York City, NY
25		Boy with flute	1623–1625	62 x 55 cm	801A	Gemäldegalerie	Berlin
26		Boy with a Glass and a Lute	1625–1630	100 x 90 cm		Guildhall Art Gallery	London
27		Head of a boy facing left with a flute	1620–1625	27.94 cm diameter		Private collection	unknown
28		Laughing boy	1625	27.94 cm diameter	AC1992.152.144	Los Angeles County Museum of Art	Los Angeles, CA
29		Laughing boy	c. 1625	30.45 cm diameter	1032	Mauritshuis	The Hague
30		Portrait of Tieleman Roosterman (the Laughing Cavalier)	1624	83 x 67 cm	84	The Wallace Collection	London
31		Portrait of Willem van Heythuysen posing with a sword	1625–1630	204.5 x 134.5 cm	14101	Alte Pinakothek	Munich
32		Portrait of Jacob Pietersz Olycan	1625	124.6 x 97.3 cm	459 (pendant to 460)	Mauritshuis	The Hague
33		Portrait of Aletta Hanemans (1606–1653)	1625	124.8 x 98.2 cm	460 (pendant to 459)	Mauritshuis	The Hague
34		Portrait of a Bearded Man with a Ruff	1625	76.2 x 63.5 cm	49734	The Metropolitan Museum of Art	New York City, NY
35		Portrait of a man facing left	1625	26.2 x 20 cm	801F	Staatliche Museen Berlin-Dahlem	Berlin
36		Portrait of Petrus Scriverius	1626	22.2 x 16.5 cm	29.100.8 (pendant to 29.100.9)	The Metropolitan Museum of Art	New York City, NY
37		Portrait of Anna van der Aar (born 1576/77, died after 1626)	1626	22.2 x 16.5 cm	29.100.9 (pendant to 29.100.8)	The Metropolitan Museum of Art	New York City, NY
38		Portrait of Michiel Jansz van Middelhoven (1562–1638)	1610–1626	87 x 70 cm		Collection Adolphe Schloss	unknown
39		Portret van Sara Andriesdr Hessix	1626	87 x 70 cm		Museu Calouste Gulbenkian	Lisbon
40		Portrait of an unknown man	c.1633	102.9 × 88.9 cm		Tokyo Fuji Art Museum	Tokyo
41		Portrait of a preacher	c.1635	62 x 52 cm	1930.186	Fogg Art Museum	Cambridge, MA
42		Portrait of Isaak Abrahamsz. Massa	1626	79.7 × 65.1 cm	54/31	The Art Gallery of Ontario	Toronto, Canada
43		The evangelist Luke	1625	70 x 55 cm	181	Odessa Museum of Western and Eastern Art	Odessa
44		The evangelist Matthew	1625	70 x 55 cm	180	Odessa Museum of Western and Eastern Art	Odessa
45		The Banquet of the Officers of the St Adrian Militia Company in 1627	1627	183 × 266.5 cm	OSI-111 (1913)	Frans Hals Museum	Haarlem
46		The Banquet of the Officers of the St George Militia Company in 1627	1627	179 × 257.5 cm	OSI-110	Frans Hals Museum	Haarlem
47		Portrait of Johannes Acronius	1627	19.4 x 17.2 cm	767	Gemäldegalerie	Berlin
48		Portrait of an unknown man	c.1627	20 × 14.2 cm	766	Gemäldegalerie	Berlin
49		Portrait of (probably) Johannes Saekma	1628	22 x 17.5 cm		Private collection	unknown
50		Portrait of (possibly) Johannes Saekma or Theodorus Schrevelius	1628	22.8 cm diameter		Private collection	unknown
51		Portrait of (possibly) Hylcke Boner or Maria van Teylingen	1628	22.8 cm diameter		Private collection	unknown
52		Portrait of a Woman in a Chair	1627	87 x 67 cm	1954.287	The Art Institute of Chicago	Chicago, IL
53		Boy playing a violin	1625–1630	18.4 × 18.8 cm		Private collection	unknown
54		Singing Girl	1626–1630	18.2 × 18.4 cm		Private collection	unknown
55		Laughing Fisherboy	1627–1630	82 x 60.2 cm		Schloss Burgsteinfurt	Steinfurt, Westphalia
56		Violin playing man in a dune landscape	c. 1630	86.4 x 70 cm	178	Museo Thyssen-Bornemisza	Madrid, Spain
57		Portrait of a man with the jawbone of a cow in his hand (Pieter Verdonck)	c. 1627	46.7 x 35.6 cm	NG1200	National Gallery of Scotland	Edinburgh
58		Boy with a glass and a pewter jug	1625–1630	38 cm diameter	G2476	Staatliches Museum Schwerin	Schwerin
59		Laughing boy with a flute	1625–1630	37.3 cm diameter	G2475	Staatliches Museum Schwerin	Schwerin
60		Two laughing boys with mug of beer	1626–1627	68 x 56.5 cm	Br.L.4	Museum Boijmans Van Beuningen	Rotterdam
61		Young Man with a Skull	c. 1626–28	92.2 x 80.8 cm	NG6458	National Gallery	London
62		Young woman (The Gypsy Girl - Malle Babbe)	c. 1625	57.8 x 52.1 cm	M.I. 926	Musée du Louvre	Paris
63		The Merry Drinker	1630	81 x 66.5 cm	SK A 135	Rijksmuseum	Amsterdam
64		Laughing man with crock, known as 'Peeckelhaeringh'	c. 1628–1630	75 x 61.5 cm	216	Museum Schloss Wilhelmshöhe	Kassel, DE
65		The 'Mulatto'	1628–1630	72 x 57.5 cm	1017	Museum der bildenden Künste	Leipzig
66		Portrait of a seated young man with a broad brim hat	1626–1929	29.3 × 23.2 cm	1940.1.12	National Gallery of Art	Washington, D.C
67		Portrait of an unknown man	1625–1649	115.5 x 91.5 cm	1910.1.69	The Frick Collection	New York City, NY
68		Portrait of an unknown man with gloves	1630	116,8 x 90,2 cm	RCIN 405349	Royal Collection	London
69		Portrait of a man with a pleated collar	1634	68 x 58 cm		Museo Nacional de San Carlos	Mexico City
70		Young woman (by Frans Hals) with a display of fruit and vegetables (by Claes van Heussen)	1630	157 x 200 cm		private collection	London
71		Fisher boy in a landscape	c. 1630	74 cm x 61 cm	188	Royal Museum of Fine Arts, Antwerp	Antwerp
72		Smiling Fishergirl	1630–1632	80.6 x 66.7 cm		Private collection	unknown
73		Fisher boy with basket	c. 1630	28.3 × 22.8 in	193	National Gallery of Ireland	Dublin
74		Portrait of a man with a beer jug	c.1630–1635	83 × 66 cm		Private collection	unknown
75		Drinking woman (Malle Babbe) with an owl on her shoulder	1630–1635	75 x 64 cm	801C	Gemäldegalerie	Berlin
76		Portrait of Samuel Ampzing	1630	16.2 x 12.3 cm		Private collection	unknown
77		Portrait of Nicolaes Woutersz van der Meer	1631	128 x 100.5 cm	OSI-117 (pendant to OSI-118)	Frans Hals Museum	Haarlem
78		Portrait of Cornelia Claesdr Vooght	1631	126.5 x 101 cm	OSI-118 (pendant to OSI-117)	Frans Hals Museum	Haarlem
79		The Officers of the St Adrian Militia Company in 1633	1633	207 x 337 cm	OSI-112	Frans Hals Museum	Haarlem
80		The company of Captain Reinier Reael and Lieutenant Cornelis Michielsz. Blaeuw, known as the ‘Meagre Company’	1633–1637	209 x 429 cm	SK C 374	Rijksmuseum	Amsterdam
81		Portrait of a Man in his Thirties	1633	64.8 x 50.2 cm	cat.1251	National Gallery	London
82		Portrait of an Elderly Lady	1633	102.5 × 86.9 cm	1937.1.67	National Gallery of Art	Washington, D.C
83		Portrait of an officer	1631	88 × 66 cm		Museo de Arte de São Paulo	São Paulo
84		Portrait of Pieter van der Broecke	1633	71.2 x 61 cm	cat.51	Kenwood House	London
85		Portrait of Michiel de Wael	1625	121 x 95.8 cm	1931.45O	Taft Museum of Art	Cincinnati, OH
86		Portrait of Nicolaes Hasselaer (1593–1635). Brewer, Captain-major of the Amsterdam civic guard	c. 1630–1633	79.5 × 66.5 cm	SK A 1246 (pendant to SK A 1247)	Rijksmuseum	Amsterdam
87		Portrait of Sara Wolphaerts van Diemen (1593–1667	c. 1630–1633	79.5 × 66.5 cm	SK-A-1247 (pendant to SK A 1246)	Rijksmuseum	Amsterdam
88		Portrait of an unknown man	1630–1633	75 × 58 cm	800 (pendant of 801)	Gemäldegalerie	Berlin
89		Portrait of an unknown woman	1630–1633	75 × 58 cm	801 (pendant of 800)	Gemäldegalerie	Berlin
90		Portrait of a man in a Yellowish-gray Jacket	c.1633	24.5 × 19.5 cm	1358	Gemäldegalerie Alte Meister	Dresden
91		Portrait of a man in a Black Jacket	c.1633	24.5 x 20 cm	1359	Gemäldegalerie Alte Meister	Dresden
92		Portrait of a man with hat	c. 1634	24.5 x 19.5 cm	618	Mauritshuis	The Hague
93		Portrait of Tieleman Roosterman	1634	117 × 87 cm	1999.173	The Cleveland Museum of Art	Cleveland, OH
94		Portrait of Catharina Brugmans	1634	115 x 85 cm	(pendant to 1999.173)	private collection	The Hague
95		Portrait of an unknown man	1634	82.5 × 70 cm	4158	Szépmüvészeti Múzeum	Budapest
96		Portrait of a young woman aged 28	1634	112.2 x 83.2 cm	51.107	Baltimore Museum of Art	Baltimore, MD
97		Portrait of a woman with a cartwheel ruff	1630–1640	80 x 64.1 cm		private collection	New York City, NY
98		Portrait of a woman facing right and holding a fan	1637	67.5 x 57 cm		Staatsgalerie Stuttgart	Stuttgart
99		Portrait of a man facing left	1637	67.5 x 57 cm		Stuttgart Staatsgalerie	Stuttgart
100		Portrait of an unknown man	1634	73 x 54 cm		Timken Museum of Art	San Diego, CA
101		Portrait of an unknown woman	1634	73.0 x 56.2 cm	23.27	Detroit Institute of Arts	Detroit, MI
102		Portrait of a family	c.1635	111.8 × 89.9 cm	1927-399	Cincinnati Art Museum	Cincinnati, OH
103		Portrait of Isaac Massa	1635	20.3 x 18.6 cm	1946–74	San Diego Museum of Art	San Diego, CA
104		Portrait of Lucas de Clercq (....-1652)	c. 1635	126.5 x 93 cm	SK-C-556 (pendant to SK-C-557)	Rijksmuseum	Amsterdam
105		Portrait of Feyntje van Steenkiste (....-1640)	1635	123 x 93 cm	SK-C-557 (pendant to SK-C-556)	Rijksmuseum	Amsterdam
106		Portrait of a man, incorrectly called Johannes Saeckma (1572–1636)	c.1635	121 x 90 cm	1276 (possible pendant of 72)	Museum Boijmans Van Beuningen	Rotterdam
107		Portrait of a woman, incorrectly called Hylck Boner	1635	116.5 x 93.3 cm	1910.1.72	The Frick Collection	New York City, NY
108		Portrait of Pieter Tjarck	1635–1638	85.25 x 69.09 cm	M.74.31	Los Angeles County Museum of Art	Los Angeles, CA
109		Portrait of a standing man holding a glove	1637	93 x 67 cm		private collection	unknown
110		Portrait of a standing woman holding a glove	1637	93 x 67 cm		private collection	unknown
111		Portrait of a man in oval frame	c.1635	94 x 72.4 cm		Woburn Abbey	Bedfordshire
112		Portrait of (possibly) Maria Larp ( -1675)	1635–1638	83.4 x 68.1 cm	6413	National Gallery	London
113		Portrait of an unknown 38-year-old man	1638	89 x 69.8 cm		Nationalmuseum	Stockholm
114		Portrait of an unknown 41-year-old woman	1638	89.1 x 70.2 cm		Nationalmuseum	Stockholm
115		Portrait of an unknown man	1638	94.4 × 70.5 cm	77 (pendant of 78)	Städel Museum	Frankfurt am Main
116		Portrait of an unknown woman	1638	94.4 × 70.5 cm	78 (pendant of 77)	Städel Museum	Frankfurt am Main
117		Portrait of Captain Andries van Hoorn	1638	86 × 67 cm	185 P (pendant to 186 P)	São Paulo Museum of Art	São Paulo
118		Portrait of Maria Pietersdr Olycan	1638	86 × 67 cm	186 P (pendant to 185 P)	São Paulo Museum of Art	São Paulo
119		Portrait of Claes Duyst van Voorhout	c.1638	80.6 x 66 cm		The Metropolitan Museum of Art	New York City, NY
120		Portrait of Cunera van Baersdorp	1625	116.7 x 91.5 cm		Private collection	England
121		Portrait of Aeltje Dircksdr. Pater (1597–1678)	1638	66.5 × 52.3 cm	1948.137	The Cleveland Museum of Art	Cleveland, OH
122		Portrait of Jean de la Chambre	1638	20.6 x 16.8 cm	6411	National Gallery	London
123		Portrait of Willem van Heythuysen (copy 20 years later by the artist)	1653	46.5 x 37.5 cm	2247	Koninklijke Musea voor Schone Kunsten of Belgium	Brussels
124		The Officers of the St George Militia Company in 1639	1639	218 × 421 cm	OSI-113	Frans Hals Museum	Haarlem
125		Portrait of a Member of the Haarlem Civic Guard	1636–1638	86 × 69 cm	1937.1.68	National Gallery of Art	Washington, D.C
126		Portrait of Hendrik Swalmius ( -1649)	1639	27 x 20 cm	49.347 (pendant of 2498)	Detroit Institute of Arts	Detroit, MI
127		Portrait of a woman, (possibly) Judith van Breda	1639	29.5 x 21 cm	2498 (pendant of 49.347)	Museum Boijmans Van Beuningen	Rotterdam
128		Portrait of Pieter Jacobsz Olycan	c. 1639	111.1 x 86.7 cm	sn251	The John and Mable Ringling Museum of Art	Sarasota, FL
129		Portrait of Maritge Claesdr. Voogt (1572–1644)	1639	128 x 94.5 cm	SK-C-139	Rijksmuseum	Amsterdam
130		portrait of a 52-year-old man with ruff collar holding a hat	1639	115 x 89.5 cm		private collection	unknown
131		Portrait of an unknown woman with folded hands	1644–1645	61.4 x 47 cm		National Gallery	London
132		Portrait of a sitting woman in a painted oval	1639	69.5 x 58 cm		stolen from Kunstmuseum Düsseldorf	unknown
133		Portrait of a young man	1638–1640	81 × 59 cm	GG_709	Kunsthistorisches Museum	Vienna
134		Portrait of a Young Man Holding a Glove	c. 1650	80 x 66.5 cm	982	Hermitage Museum	St. Petersburg (Russia)
135		Portrait of Daniel van Aken	1630–1666	67 x 57 cm	NM 1567	National Museum	Stockholm
136		Portrait of an unknown woman	1640	85.2 × 68.1 cm	1898B	Museum of Fine Arts, Ghent	Ghent
137		Portrait of an unknown man, possibly Albert van Nierop	c.1640	120 x 95 cm	WRM 2529 (pendant of WRM 2530)	Wallraf-Richartz-Museum	Cologne
138		Portrait of an unknown woman, possibly Cornelia van der Meer	c.1640	120 x 94.5 cm	WRM 2530 (pendant of WRM 2529)	Wallraf-Richartz-Museum	Cologne
139		Portrait of a 56-year-old man, possibly Willem van Warmondt	1640	114 x 99 cm	1038	Collectie Nederland	Amsterdam
140		Regenten of the Grote of St. Elisabeth Gasthuis, Haarlem 1641	1641	153 x 252 cm	OSI-114	Frans Hals Museum	Haarlem
141		Portrait of a Woman Holding a Fan	c. 1640	79.8 x 59 cm		National Gallery	London
142		Portrait of a man, possibly Johan de Wael (1594–1663)	1638	69.7 x 54 cm	(pendant of 1948.137)	Private collection	Germany
143		Portrait of an unknown man holding a book	1640s	66 x 48.3 cm		private collection	Paris
144		Portrait of Paulus Verschueren (1606–1667)	1643	118.7 × 94 cm	26.101.11	The Metropolitan Museum of Art	New York City, NY
145		Portrait of an elderly man facing right with hat and ruff collar	1643	92.7 x 75 cm		private collection	unknown
146		Portrait of a man holding a watch	1643	82.6 x 66.7 cm	BF262 (pendant of NM6421)	Museum Barnes Foundation	Philadelphia, PA
147		Portrait of an unknown woman	1643	82,6 x 67,3 cm	NM6421 (pendant of BF262)	Nationalmuseum Stockholm	Stockholm
148		Portrait of a man	1640–1642	79.2 x 65.3 cm		Kiel, Schloss Museum	Kiel
149		Portrait of Mr. Bodolphe	1643	122.4 × 97.5 cm	1961.18.23 (pendant to 1961.18.24)	Yale University Art Gallery	New Haven, CT
150		Portrait of Mrs. Bodolphe	1643	122.4 × 97.5 cm	1961.18.24 (pendant to 1961.18.23)	Yale University Art Gallery	New Haven, CT
151		Portrait of a man dressed in black with a white collar and cuffs and holding a silver-topped cane	1643	31.7 x 27.2 cm		Private collection	unknown
152		Portrait of Conradus Viëtor	1644	82.5 x 66 cm		private collection	New York City, NY
153		Portrait of a man facing right	1640–1642	29.5 x 23.5 cm		Staatliche Kunstsammlungen	Kassel, DE
154		Portrait of a man facing left	1640–1642	30.5 x 24.5 cm		Staatliche Kunstsammlungen	Kassel, DE
155		Portrait of a man	c.1645	42.4 × 33 cm	15.901	National Gallery of Canada	Ottawa, Canada
156		A Dutch Gentleman	1643–1645	115 x 86.1 cm	NG691 (pendant of NG692)	National Gallery of Scotland	Edinburgh
157		A Dutch Lady	1643–1645	115 x 85.8 cm	NG692 (pendant of NG691)	National Gallery of Scotland	Edinburgh
158		Portrait of a standing man holding a glove	1644–1645	88 x 65 cm		private collection	unknown
159		Portrait of a man, possibly the doctor Nicolaes Tulp	1644	70 × 55 cm	collectie Six	Six collection	Amsterdam
160		Portrait of Joseph Coymans	1644	33 x 27 1/2 in	(pendant to 1938.231)	Wadsworth Atheneum	Hartford, CT
161		Portrait of Dorothea Berck	1644	83.8 × 69.6 cm	1938.231	Baltimore Museum of Art	Baltimore, MD
162		Portrait of a 35-year-old woman with a millstone collar	1644	75.9 × 62.5 cm	14/21	Michaelis Collection	Cape Town, S.A.
163		Portrait of an unknown man	c. 1645	78.5 × 67.3 cm	NG2528	National Gallery	London
164		Portrait of an artist (possibly Harmen Hals)	1644	82.6 x 64.8 cm	94.1023	The Art Institute of Chicago	Chicago, IL
165		Portrait of Johannes Hoornbeeck	1645	80 x 68 cm	2245	Koninklijke Musea voor Schone Kunsten of Belgium	Brussels
166		Portrait of Willem Coymans, a.k.a. Balthasar Coymans	1645	77 × 64 cm	1937.1.69	National Gallery of Art	Washington, D.C
167		Portrait of a man leaning over the back of a chair with a black hat	1646–1648	68 x 56 cm	1937.1.71	National Gallery of Art	Washington, D.C
168		Portrait of Jasper Schade van Westrum	1645	80 × 67.5 cm	O638	National Gallery in Prague	Prague
169		Portrait of a man	1643	76 x 66		Herzoglisches Museum, Gotha	Gotha
170		Portrait of a woman	c. 1644	84.3 by 68 cm		private collection	unknown
171		Portrait of an unknown woman	1648–1650	108 × 80 cm	MI 927	Musée du Louvre	Paris
172		Portrait of an unknown woman	1648–1650	35 x 29 cm		Aurora Art Fund	Bucharest
173		Portrait of a Seated Man Holding a Hat	1648–1650	109.8 x 82.5 cm	1931.451 (pendant of 1931.455)	Taft Museum of Art	Cincinnati, OH
174		Portrait of a seated Woman Holding a Fan	1648–1650	109.5 x 82.5 cm	1931.455 (pendant of 1931.451)	Taft Museum of Art	Cincinnati, OH
175		Portrait of the French philosopher and mathematician René Descartes (1596–1650)	1649	19 x 14 cm	DEP7	Statens Museum for Kunst	Copenhagen
176		Portrait of a family	c. 1645–1650	148.5 x 251 cm	2285	National Gallery	London
177		Family group in landscape	1645–1648	202 x 285 cm	179 (1934.8)	Museo Thyssen-Bornemisza	Madrid, Spain
178		Portrait of (possibly) John Livingston (1603–1672)	1650–1655	58.4 x 47 cm		Private collection	unknown
179		Portrait of Nicolaas Stenius (1605–1670)	1650	100 x 75.5 cm	BMH s662	Museum Catharijneconvent	Utrecht
180		Portrait of a man aged 73	1650	83.7 x 64.7 cm		Greystoke Castle	Penrith, Cumbria
181		Portrait of a woman	1650	84.6 x 69.2 cm	51.3	Museum of Fine Arts, Houston	Houston, TX
182		Portrait of a Man	1650	104 x 90 cm		Nelson-Atkins Museum	Kansas City, MO
183		Portrait of an unknown woman	1650–1652	102.6 × 88.9 cm	272:1955	Saint Louis Art Museum	Saint Louis, MO
184		Portrait of an unknown man	1650–1652	108 × 80 cm	lot 37A	Liechtenstein Museum	Vienna
185		Portrait of an unknown woman	1650–1652	100.3 × 81.3 cm	9092	Kunsthistorisches Museum	Vienna
186		Portrait of a man	after 1650	100.3 x 82.9 cm	1906.1.71 (pendant to 912610)	The Frick Collection	New York City, NY
187		Portrait of a woman	after 1650	100 x 81.9 cm	91.26.10 (pendant to 1906.1.71)	The Metropolitan Museum of Art	New York City, NY
188		Portrait of Stephanus Geeraerdts ( -1671)	1648–1650	115.4 × 87.5 cm	674	Royal Museum of Fine Arts, Antwerp	Antwerp
189		Portrait of Isabella Coymans ( -1689)	1648–1650	116 × 86 cm	(pendant to 674)	Private collection	unknown
190		Portrait of an unknown man	1650–1652	110.5 x 86.3 cm	91.26.9	The Metropolitan Museum of Art	New York City, NY
191		Portrait of an unknown man	1650–1652	115 x 84.5 cm	1942.9.29	National Gallery of Art	Washington, D.C
192		Portrait of a man, possibly Adriaen Jansz. van Ostade (1610–1685)	1645–1648	94 × 75 cm	1937-1-70	National Gallery of Art	Washington, D.C
193		Portrait of a man with long hair and a mustache	1650–1652	84.7 x 67 cm	816	Hermitage Museum	St. Petersburg (Russia)
194		Portrait of Jan Asselyn	1634	64.5 x 46.3 cm	4158	Szépmüvészeti Múzeum	Budapest
195		Portrait of a man facing forward	1650–1652	65 x 56.5 cm		Private collection	unknown
196		Portrait of an unknown woman	1655–1660	60 x 55.6 cm	KINCM:2005.5003	Ferens Art Gallery	Hull
197		Portrait of a Man	1655–1660	77.47 cm x 64.77 cm	68.101	Memorial Art Gallery	Rochester, NY
198		Portrait of an unknown man	1648–1650	63.5 x 53.5 cm	1942.9.28	National Gallery of Art	Washington, D.C
199		The Traveller	1655–1660	35 x 26 cm		Heinz Kuckei Collection	Berlin
200		Portrait of a young man	1650–1655	67.3 x 50.8 cm	M.1972.4.P	Norton Simon Museum	Pasadena, CA
201		Portrait of Tyman Oosdorp	c. 1656	89 x 70 cm	801H	Gemäldegalerie	Berlin
202		Portrait of a Man	1655–1660	104 x 84.5	KMS3847	Statens Museum for Kunst	Copenhagen
203		Portrait of Vincent Laurensz van der Vinne	1655	64.8 x 49 cm		The Art Gallery of Ontario	Toronto, Canada
204		Portrait of an unknown man	1655–1660	65 × 45 cm		Museo Thyssen-Bornemisza	Madrid, Spain
205		Portrait of an unknown woman	1655–1660	65 × 45 cm		Museo Thyssen-Bornemisza	Madrid, Spain
206		Portrait of Frans Jansz Post (1612–1680)	c. 1655	27.5 × 23 cm		Worcester Art Museum	Worcester, MA
207		Portret van Adrianus Tegularius	1650–1654	27.9 x 22.8 cm		private collection	unknown
208		Portrait of a man, possibly a minister	1660	37 x 29.8 cm	SK A 2859	Rijksmuseum	Amsterdam
209		Portrait of an unknown man	1658–1660	35.5 x 29.5 cm		Yale University Art Gallery	New Haven, CT
210		Portrait of a man	c. 1660	31.6 x 25.5 cm	928	Mauritshuis	The Hague
211		Portrait of an unknown woman	1660–1666	44.5 x 34.3 cm	PO589	Christ Church Picture Gallery	Oxford, Engeland
212		Portrait of Cornelis Guldewagen (1599–1663)	1660–1663	40 x 30.5 cm		Krannert Art Museum	Urbana, IL
213		Portrait of Willem Croes (d.1666)	1662–1666	47.1 × 34.4 cm	8402	Alte Pinakothek	Munich
214		Portrait of an unknown man	after 1650	113 × 81.9 cm	1917.1.70	The Frick Collection	New York City, NY
215		Portrait of Herman Langelius	c.1660	76 x 63.5 cm		Musée de Picardie	Amiens
216		Portrait of a Seated Man	1660–1666	69 x 60.5 cm		Musée Jacquemart-André	Paris
217		Portrait of Isaac Massa with a large floppy hat	1661–1663	79.5 × 66.5 cm	219	Museum Schloss Wilhelmshöhe	Kassel, DE
218		Portrait of a man in a gray cloak with wide brim hat perched at an angle on his head	1660–1663	80 × 67 cm	150	Fitzwilliam Museum	Cambridge
219		Portrait of a man with a tassle collar	1660–1666	70 x 58.5 cm		Kunsthaus Zurich	Zurich
220		Portrait of an unknown man	1660–1666	85.8 x 66.9 cm	66.1054	Museum of Fine Arts	Boston, MA
221		Group portrait of the Regents of the Old Men's Almshouse	1664	172.5 x 256 cm	OSI-115	Frans Hals Museum	Haarlem
222		Group portrait of the Regentesses of the Old Men's Almshouse	1664	170.5 x 249.5 cm	OSI-116	Frans Hals Museum	Haarlem

== See also ==
- Marriage pendant portraits by Frans Hals – a list showing the marriage pendants side-by-side
- List of paintings by Frans Hals – updated (but still incomplete) list

== Sources ==
- Frans Hals, by Seymour Slive, a catalogue raisonné of Hals works by Seymour Slive: Volume Three, the catalogue, National Gallery of Art: Kress Foundation, Studies in the History of European Art, London: Phaidon Press, 1974
- Frans Hals, by Seymour Slive (editor), with contributions by Pieter Biesboer, Martin Bijl, Karin Groen and Ella Hendriks, Michael Hoyle, Frances S. Jowell, Koos Levy-van Halm and Liesbeth Abraham, Bianca M. Du Mortier, Irene van Thiel-Stroman, Prestel-Verlag, Munich & Mercatorfonds, Antwerp, 1989, ISBN 3791310321
- Frans Hals: het gehele oeuvre, by Claus Grimm, Amsterdam, Meulenhoff/Landshoff, 1990
- Frans Hals in the RKD
