= Adrianus Tegularius =

Dutch theologian

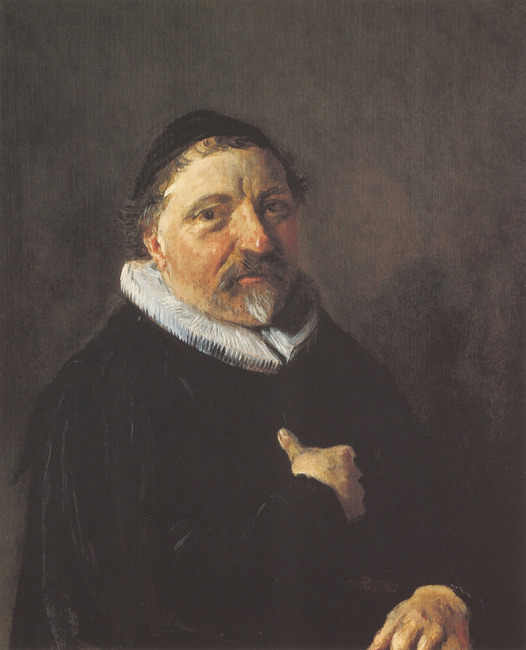
- Born: 1605
- Died: 1654 (aged 48–49); Haarlem

Adrianus Tegularius (1605–1654) was a theologian from the Northern Netherlands best known today for his portrait by Frans Hals.

He was the brother of Hermannus Tegularius, who became a Remonstrant minister in Delft. Both brothers were writers and ministers and spent their youth as minister in various North Holland communities. Adrianus was called to Grootebroek from Hem in 1633 and from there to Haarlem in 1641, where he stayed. Hermannus was minister in Hippolytushoef in 1626 and in De Rijp in 1629, before being called to Delft in 1638. Adrianus married and had at least two children. A daughter is recorded marrying Alberto van Berckhout 8 January 1642 in Purmerend, and his son Albertus became minister in Wieringen in 1677 and in Grootebroek in 1680. During his time in Haarlem Tegularius took part in the North Holland Synod as representative from Haarlem. In 1644 the Synod was in Alkmaar and he was the scribe, and in 1653 in Hoorn he was the assistant to the praeses.

== Works ==
- "Het eygen gevoelen van een arminiaens of remonstrants predikant. Ende daer by het eygen gevoelen van een gereformeert predikant", published by Paschier de Fijne, Adrianus Tegularius, Thomas Fonteyn, Haarlem by the printer T. Fonteyn, 1644

== Hals portrait ==
The Hals portrait was probably to be used for Tegularius' book, though he died soon afterwards and the engraved portrait by Jonas Suyderhoef was published posthumously. His brother, who was the same age but who survived him by 12 years, had his portrait made by Cornelis Dame and engraved by Frederik Bouttats the Elder.

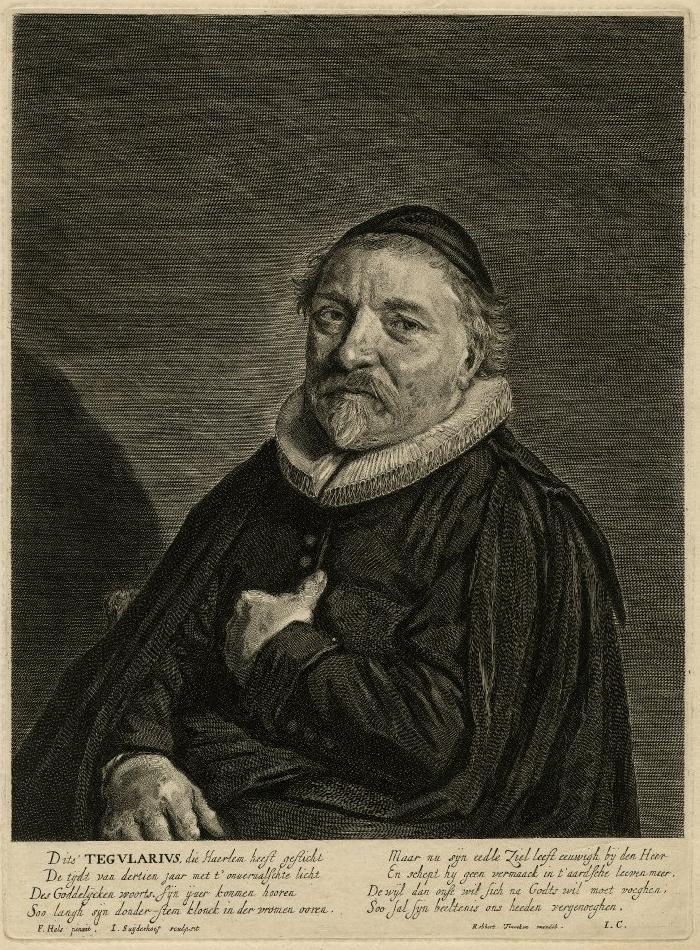

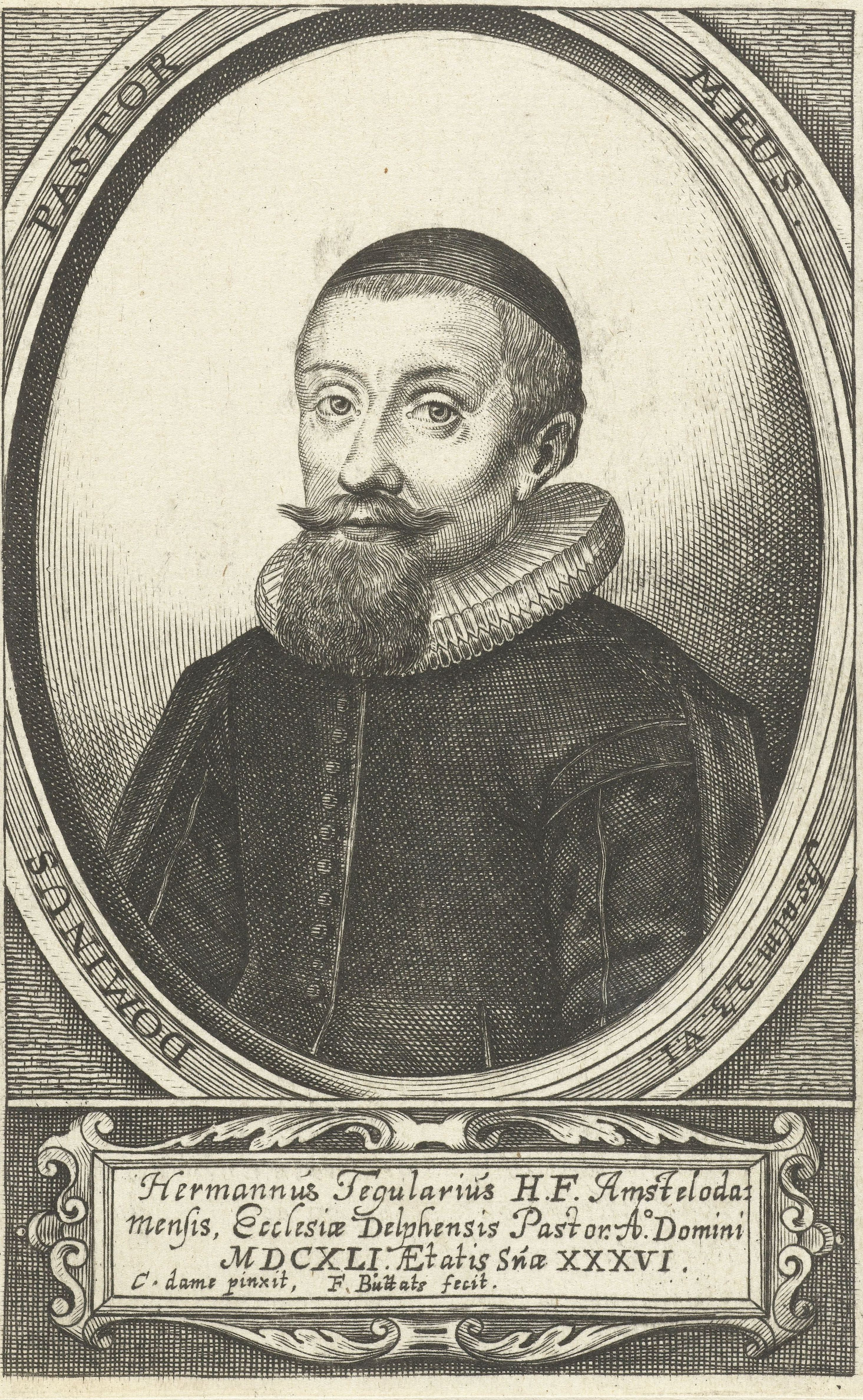

In 1910 Hofstede de Groot documented his portrait by Hals and wrote "229. ADRIANUS TEGULARIUS (born 1605), Preacher at Haarlem. M. 76. Half-length. He faces three-quarters right and looks at the spectator. His right hand is on his breast; his left hand is held to the front, at the lower edge of the picture. He has a moustache and imperial. He is in black with a small ruff and a black cap. A spirited sketch for Suyderhoef's print. Panel, 11 inches by 9 inches. See Moes, Iconographia Batava, No. 7869. Engraved by J. Suyderhoef. Exhibited at Dusseldorf, 1886, No. 135; and in the Portrait Exhibition at The Hague, 1903, No. 37. Sales. Jer. de Bosch, Amsterdam, April 6, 1812, No. 27. Amsterdam, April 9, 1848, No. 20 (14 florins 50, De Vries). Von Friesen, Cologne, March 26, 1885. In the collection of Werner Dahl, Dusseldorf; he sold it in 1901 to A. Schloss. In the collection of Adolphe Schloss, Paris."

In 1943 the portrait of Adrianus Tegularius was taken by the Vichy government as part of the collection of Adolphe Schloss. It was never recovered during the post-war years. In March 1990, the portrait was displayed at TEFAF Maastricht where a descendant of the Schloss family was able to spot it, and the responsible dealer was charged with a prison sentence. The painting was finally restituted to the Schloss heirs in 2001.
