= Michiel Jansz van Middelhoven =

Dutch theologian

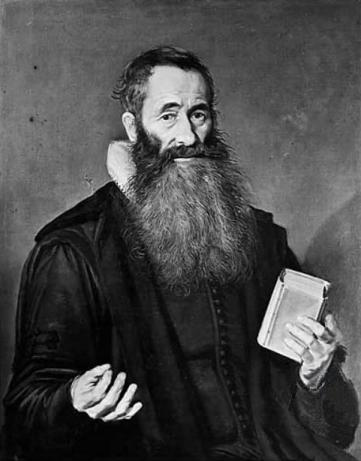
Michiel Jansz van Middelhoven, aged 64 in 1626, by Hals (confiscated during WWII and whereabouts unknown)

Michiel Jansz van Middelhoven (1562–1638), was a Dutch theologian best known today for his portrait by Frans Hals.

== Biography ==
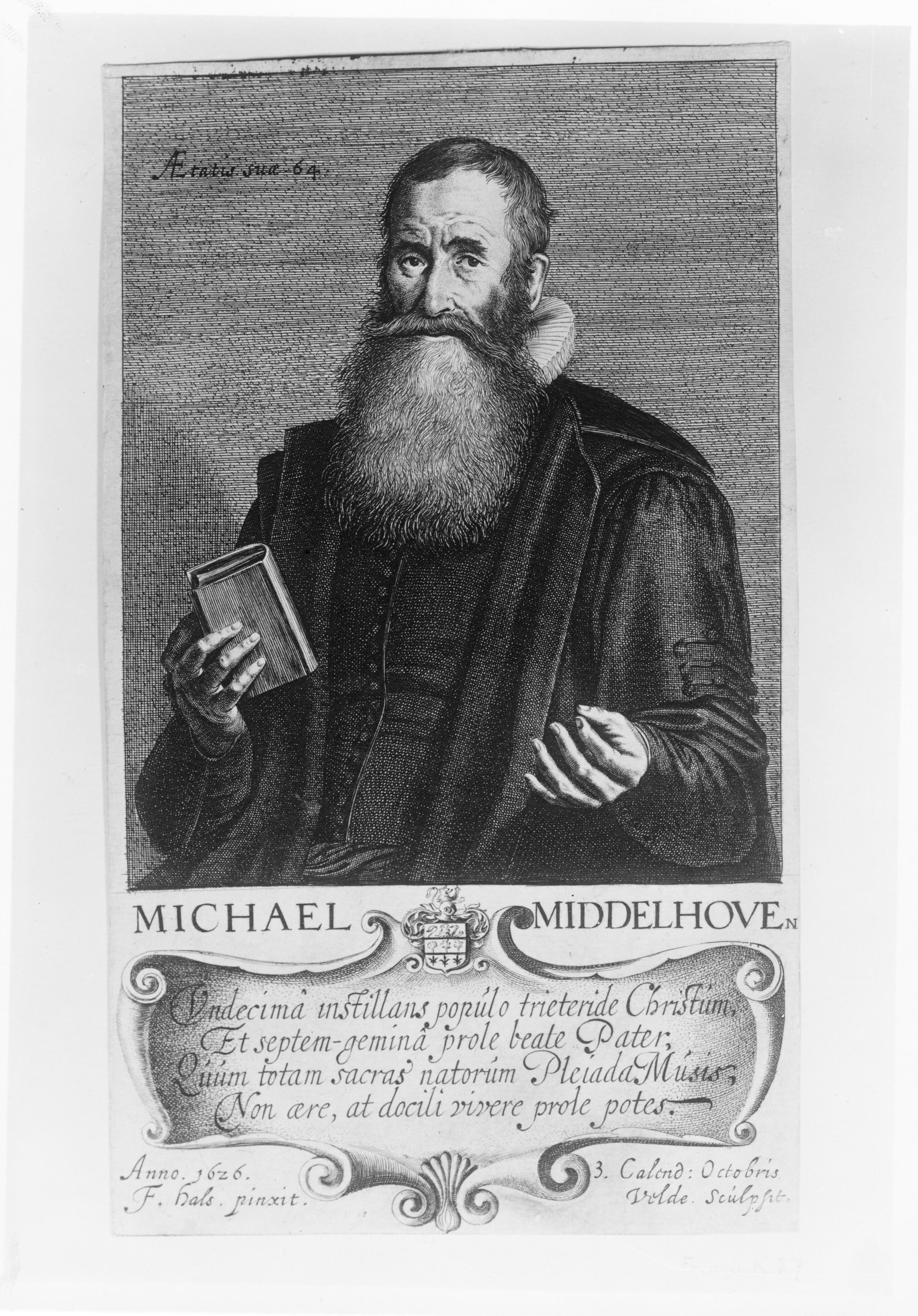
Print by Jan van de Velde dated 1626

He was born in Dordrecht and from 1592-1634 was pastor in Voorschoten. He was active against the Remonstrants and preached in Rotterdam in the Kruiskerk when all the other contra-remonstrants pastors had fled. He married Sara Andriesdr Hessix in Leiden in 1586 and they had 7 sons who all became pastors. The artist Jan van de Velde made a print of his portrait in 1626 with Latin inscriptions that was in the collection of Frits Lugt.

He moved back to Leiden near the end of his life, where he died. His portrait was documented by Hofstede de Groot in 1910, who wrote:

"202. MICHIEL JANSZ VAN MIDDELHOVEN (born at Dordrecht, 1562, died at Leyden about 1638), preacher at Voorschoten from 1602 to 1634. B. 57, 64; M. 55. Half-length. He is turned three-quarters left, but looks at the spectator. In his left hand is a book with red edges, his forefinger marking the place. His right hand, with the forefinger and thumb pressed together, makes a gesture as if he were speaking. He has a long full beard. He wears black with a black velvet collar, and over it a ruff. [Pendant to 203.] Canvas, 34 1/2 inches by 28 inches. The picture mentioned by Bode as No. 57 must surely be the same as B. 64; probably this is an inadvertence. Engraved by J. van de Velde, 1626. See Moes, Iconographia Batava, No. 5051. In the collection of Count Andre Mniszech, Paris. In the possession of the Paris dealer F. Kleinberger. In the collection of Adolphe Schloss, Paris." Sara's pendant portrait to Michael's, in which she is also seated and holding a book, was also attributed to Hals by Hofstede de Groot and included as catalog #203:

"203. SARA ANDRIESDR. HESSIX, wife of M. J. van Middelhoven, married at Leyden, 1586. B. 58; M. 56. Three-quarter-length. She is seated almost in full face, but turned slightly to the left, and looks at the spectator. Her outstretched right hand rests on her bosom. Her left forearm rests on the arm of the chair, with a book in the left hand. She is in black with a white cap, a ruff, and wristbands. [Pendant to 202.] Canvas, 34 1/2 inches by 28 inches. In the collection of Count Andre Mniszech, Paris. In the possession of the Paris dealer F. Kleinberger. In the collection of A. de Ridder, Cronberg, near Frankfort-on-Main."

== Pendants (40th wedding anniversary) ==
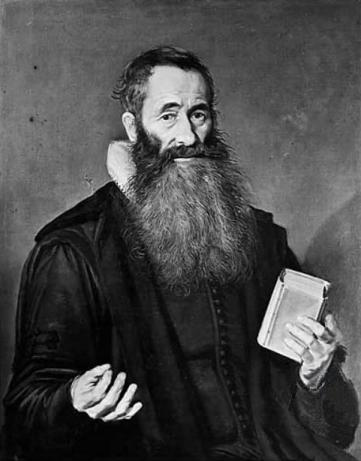

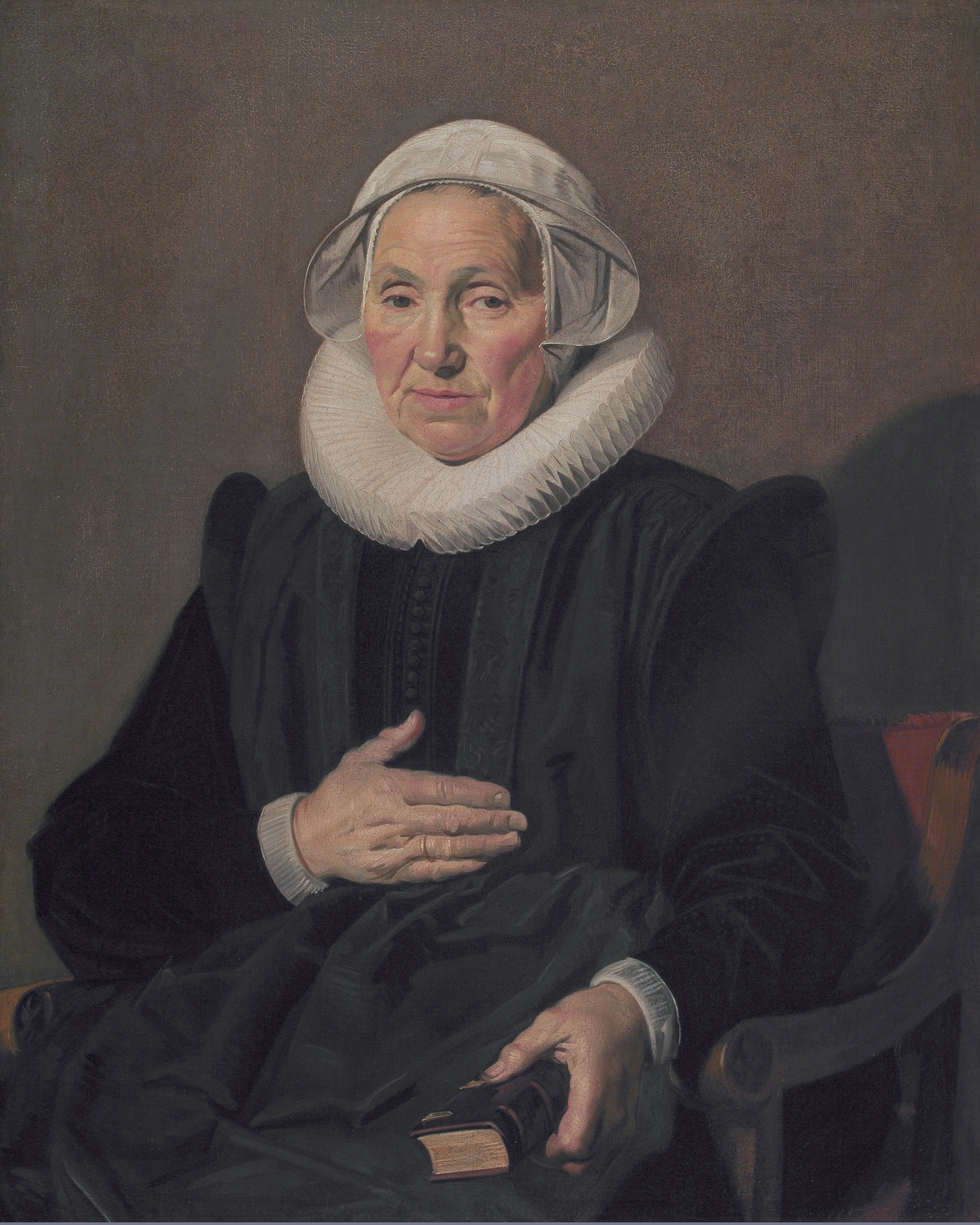
