= Pieter Cornelisz van der Morsch =

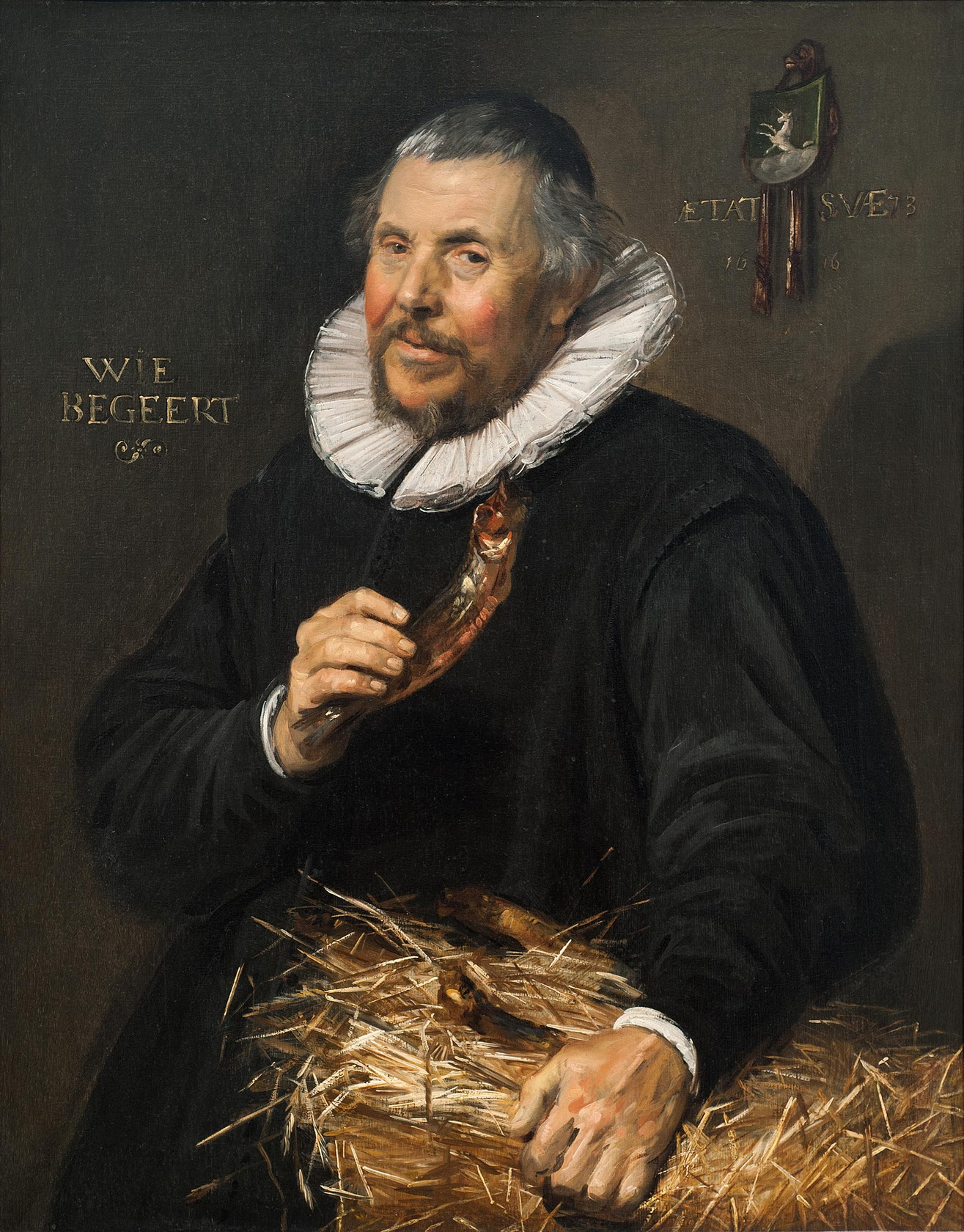
Portrait of Pieter Cornelisz. van der Morsch, 1616, collection Carnegie Museum of Art

Pieter Cornelisz van der Morsch (1543 – 1628), was a man in Leiden best known today for his portrait that was painted by Frans Hals in 1616.

According to K.van der Laan he was the Leiden Beadle and called himself Piero. He was the jester of the Leiden rederijkers club De Witte Acoleyen and signed his works with his motto, which was "LX.N.Tyt" (spoken "el eks en Tyt", or "to each his time"). In 1598 he sent an invitation in rhyme to the other rederijker clubs to come perform at his wedding, and nine did.

In the portrait of him painted by Hals, he is shown holding a smoked herring (the word for herring "bucken", or "bokking", has the double meaning of herring and red herring, referring to satiric comments). On the left, the text "Wie begeert?" means "Who wants some?". This phrase accompanied by the little monkey's head holding up his coat of arms in the upper right hand corner refer to his sharp wit and his epitaph, which he wrote himself. This epitaph was "Hier Leyt Piero/die deelde Bucken/En was Hier Bo/Van In te Rucken". Loosely translated this means Here lies Piero who handed out satiric comments; he was here "Bo" (Beadle) to be pulled, where these last words mean that from "pulling your leg", he could now be pulled from the heavens above.

This painting was documented by Hofstede de Groot in 1910, who wrote; "205. PIETER CORNELISZ VAN DER MORSCH (1546- 1629). B. 143; M. 259. Half-length. He is seen in full face, slightly turned to the left, and looks at the spectator. In his left hand he carries a basket of herrings packed in straw; he holds up a herring in his right hand. Dark-green background. On the wall to the left is inscribed, "WIE BEEGERT"; to the right at top is his coat-of-arms, bearing half a silver unicorn. Inscribed below the coat-of-arms, " AETAT SVAE 73 (and under this) 1616"; panel, 33 inches by 26 1/2 inches. See Moes, Iconographia Batava, No. 5171. An eighteenth-century drawing by V. van der Vinne after this portrait was in the Wertheim collection, Amsterdam, about 1883. Sales. Van Tol, Soeterwoude, near Leyden, June 15, 1779, No. 8 (15 florins, Delfos). Barend Kooy, Amsterdam, April 20, 1820, No. 38' (10 florins, Kopersmit). C. H. Hodges and others, Amsterdam, February 27, 1838, No. 294. J. A. Töpfer, Amsterdam, November 16, 1841, No. 28 (15 florins 50, Thijssen. In the possession of the London dealer Martin Colnaghi, from whom it was acquired in 1866. In the collection of the Earl of Northbrook, London, 1889 catalogue, No. 61."

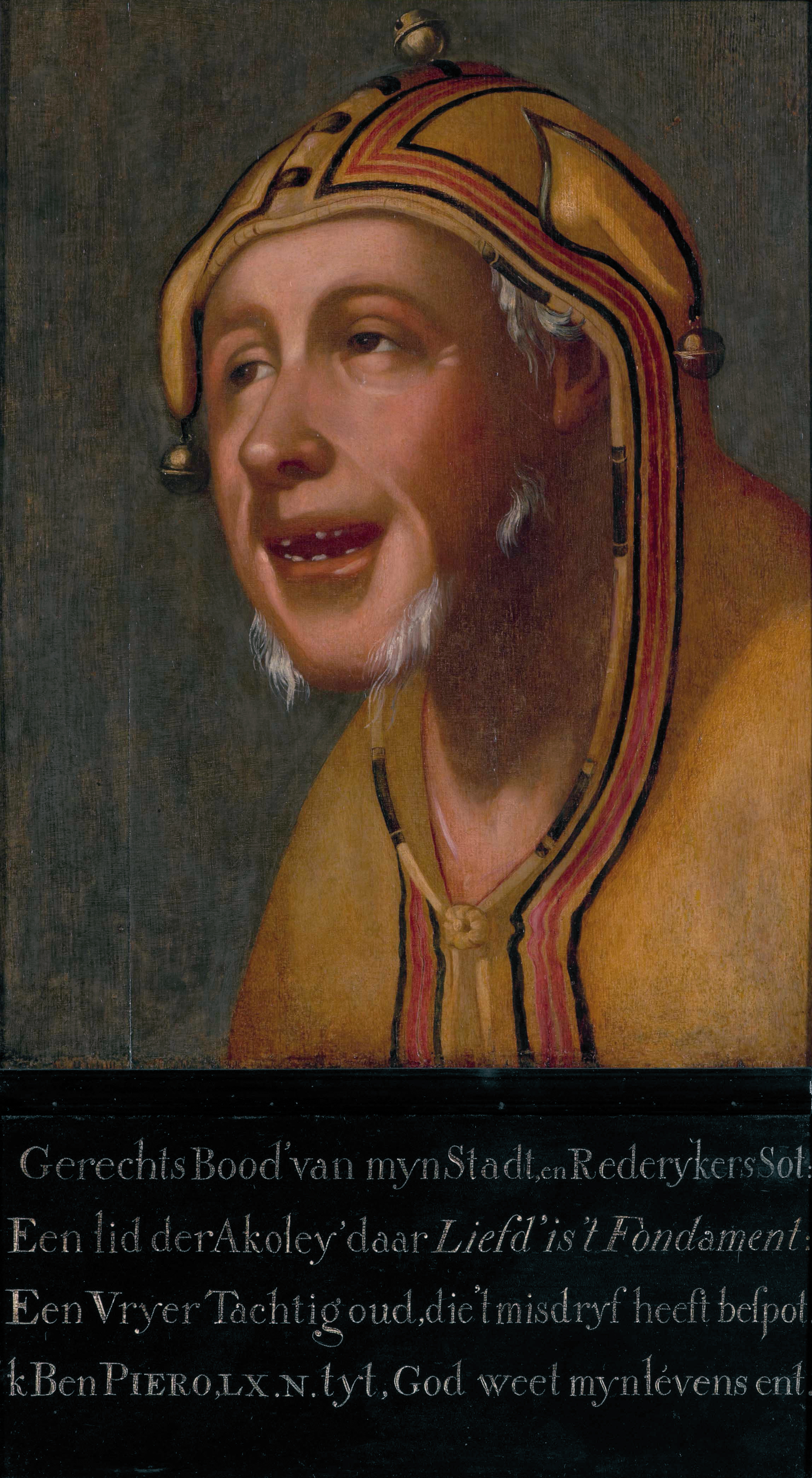
Possibly Pieter Cornelisz. van der Morsch (after Cornelis Cornelisz. van Haarlem) as Piero
