= Portrait of a Man (Frans Hals, Frick) =

Painting by Frans Hals

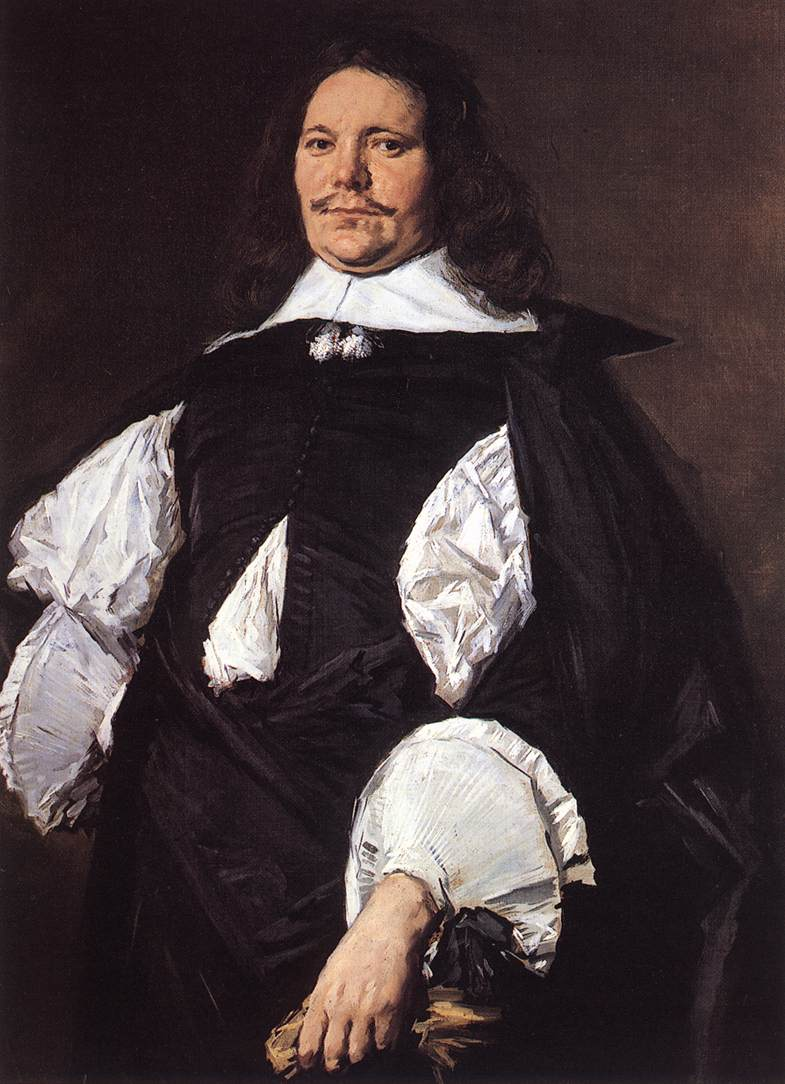
- Artist: Frans Hals
- Year: c. 1660
- Catalogue: Seymour Slive, Catalog 1974: #214
- Medium: Oil on canvas
- Dimensions: 113 cm × 81.9 cm (44 in × 32.2 in)
- Location: The Frick Collection; New York City
- Accession: 1917.1.70
- Website: collections.frick.org/view/objects/asitem/items$0040:201

Portrait of a Man is an oil-on-canvas painting by the Dutch Golden Age painter Frans Hals, painted c. 1660 and now in the Frick Collection, New York City. The man has been mistakenly identified as Michiel de Ruyter.

== Painting ==
The painting is signed on the left at the level of the collar with the FH monogram and shows a man proudly displaying his fine linen shirt that pours out of his split-sleeve jacket. The opulence of the fabric is emphasized by the way the man has wrapped his cloak around him, under his right arm to show off his sleeve. Such abundant wrist collars are rarely seen in Hals portraits or indeed any Haarlem sitters. The personage depicted was possibly a cloth merchant or burgemeester. Hals mostly portrayed local people, barring a few rare examples of smaller portraits that were possibly painted for visitors to the town.

In his 1910 catalog of Frans Hals works Hofstede de Groot wrote:

247. PORTRAIT OF A MAN STANDING. M. 148. Three-quarter-length. He is seen in full face, and looks at the spectator. His left arm, holding his gloves, hangs down almost straight; the right hand is not seen, but is obviously pressed to his side. He has long dark-brown hair and a slight moustache. He is in black with a close-fitting white collar and white wristbands. His white shirt peeps out at the throat and the sleeves. The sitter is not the famous Admiral Michael Adriaensz de Ruyter, as was formerly supposed, but a simple citizen. It is a masterly painting executed, one might almost assume, without any preliminary sketch, but drawn with the brush. [Compare 257.] Signed on the left at top with the monogram; canvas, 45 inches by 32 1/2 inches.

Exhibited at Manchester, 1857, No. 671; at the Portrait Exhibition, The Hague, 1903, No. 38; at the Guildhall, London, 1903, No. 175; and at the Royal Academy, 1907, No. 47.

In the collection of Earl Spencer, Althorp, No. 507.

In his 1974 catalog of Frans Hals works, Seymour Slive mentions that the painting was shown at all of the shows Hofstede de Groot listed as a portrait of the Admiral De Ruyter, but the art historian Théophile Thoré-Bürger (W. Bürger) first mentioned in 1860 that the portrait looks nothing like the famous De Ruyter portrait by Ferdinand Bol in the Rijksmuseum. After being in the Althorp collection for a half-century, it was sold to the art dealer Joseph Duveen, 1st Baron Duveen who then sold it to Henry Clay Frick. Slive dated the painting circa 1660 based on the style and clothing.

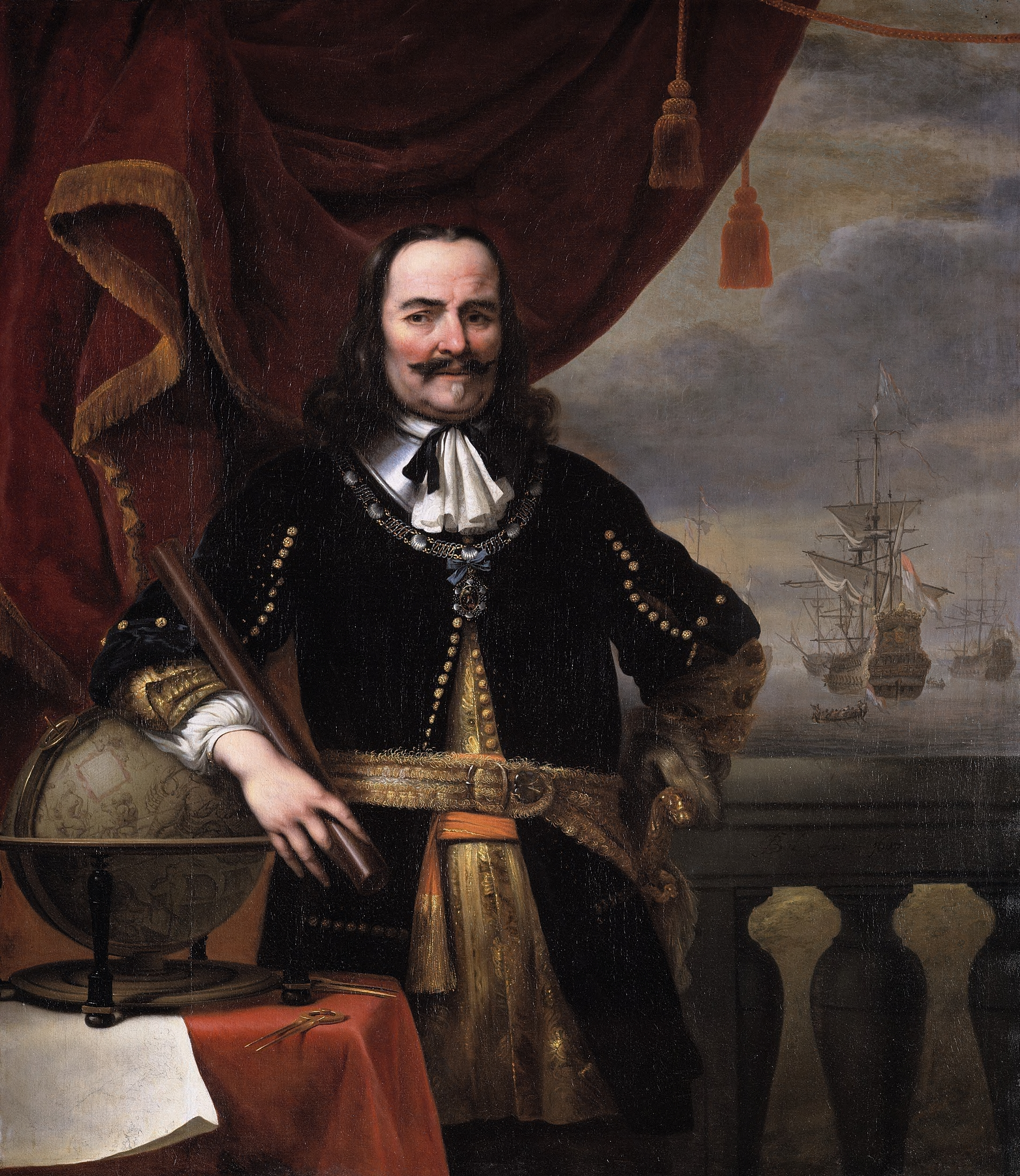
De Ruyter by Bol, 1667

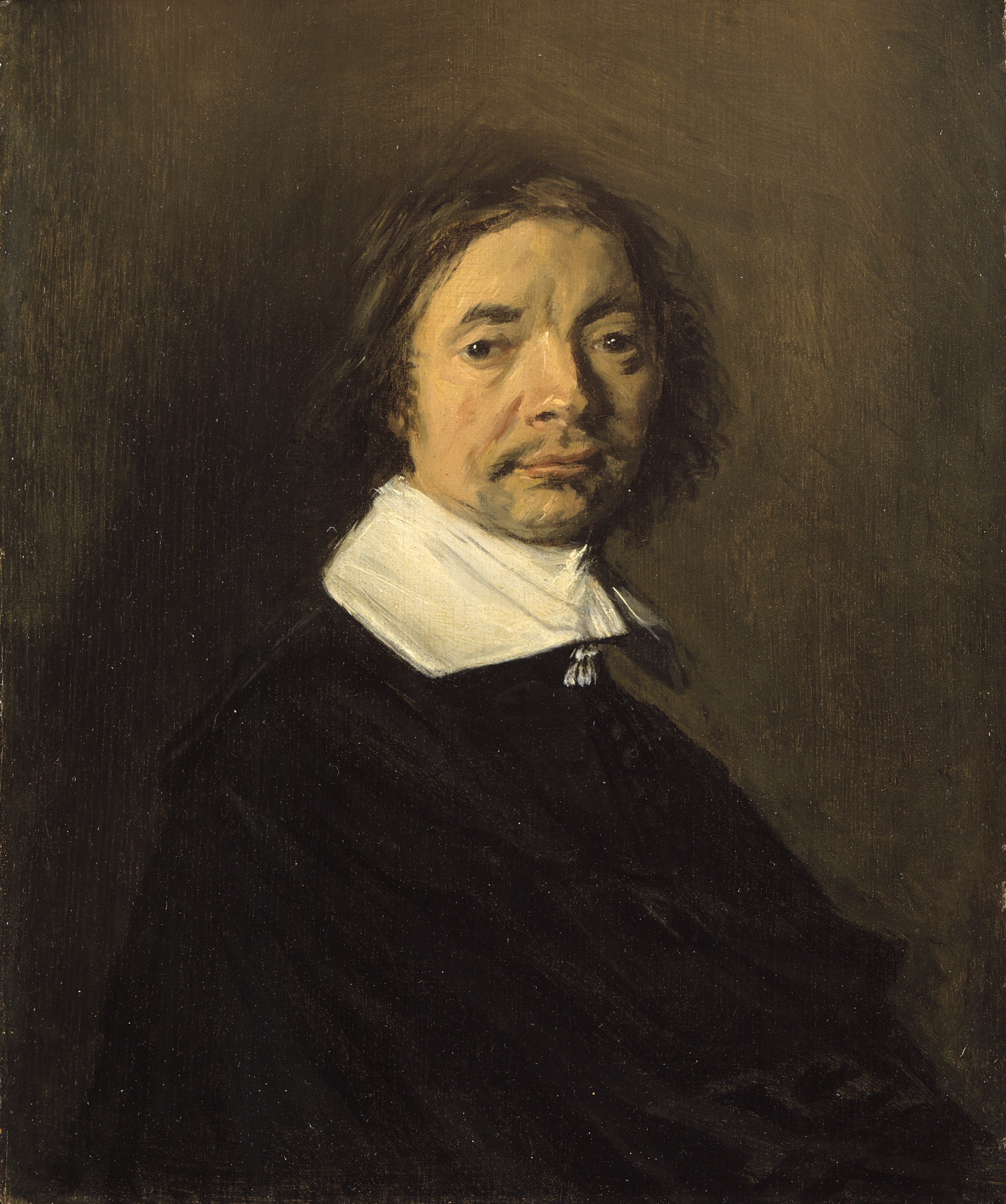
Hofstede de Groot's cat. nr. 257, also circa 1660

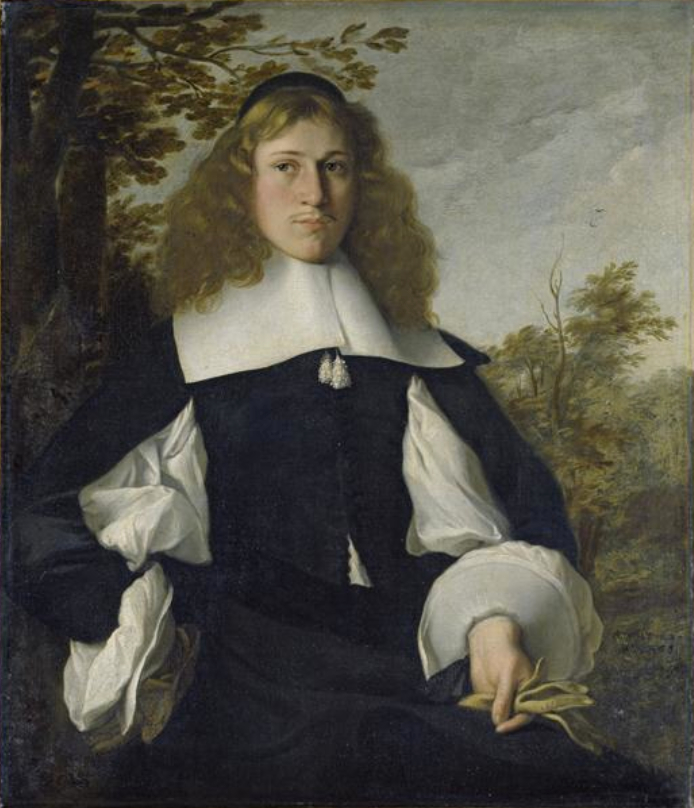
Similar stance and sleeves by Hals pupil Bartholomeus van der Helst

== See also ==
- List of paintings by Frans Hals
