= Claes Duyst van Voorhout =

Painting by Frans Hals

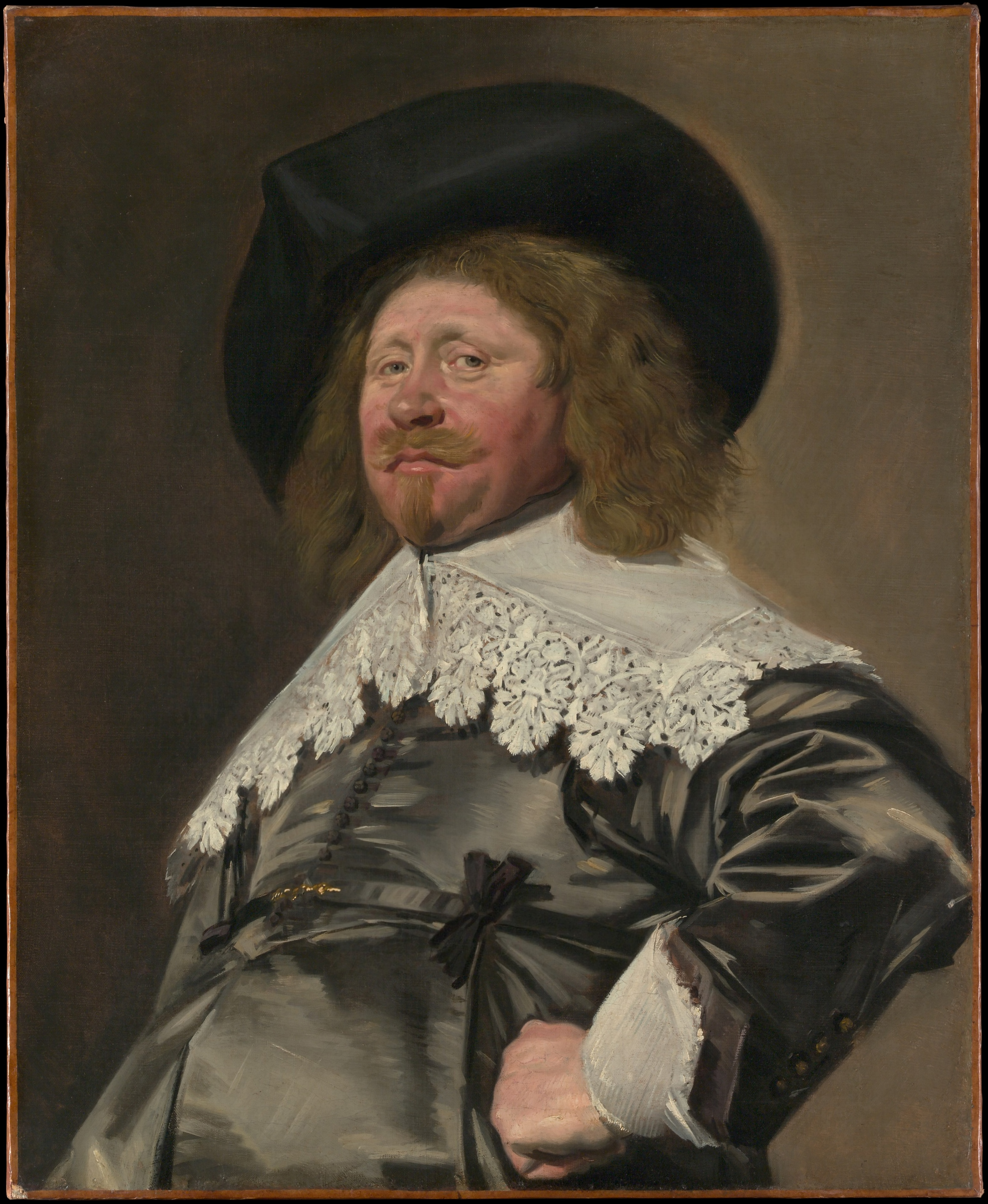
- Claes Duyst van Voorhout, c.1638. Oil on canvas, 80.7 x 66 cm
- Artist: Frans Hals
- Year: 1638
- Catalogue: Seymour Slive, Catalog 1974: #119
- Medium: Oil on canvas
- Dimensions: 80.7 cm × 66 cm (31.8 in × 26 in)
- Location: Metropolitan Museum of Art, The Jules Bache Collection, 1949; New York
- Accession: 49.7.33
- Website: MET online

Claes Duyst van Voorhout is an oil-on-canvas portrait painting by the Dutch Golden Age painter Frans Hals, painted in 1638 and now in the Metropolitan Museum of Art, New York City.

== Painting ==
The painting shows a tastefully dressed young man in a floppy hat with his hand on his hip in a characteristic Hals pose. The dress of the man fits his occupation, that of a Haarlem brewer, but unlike other Haarlem brewers that Hals portrayed, his name is not found in the archives of the local militias. The occasion for which it was painted is unknown, but the painting is probably not a wedding pendant, because Hals was quite consistent with his pendant portraits; positioning the man on the left and the woman on the right. This allowed the light which always shines from the left in his paintings, to shine directly on the woman's face and not the man's. Possibly this portrait was made to decorate a hofje or his brewery, so that people who worked for him or visited the premises could know what the owner Claes Duyst van Voorhout looked like. For the same reason it is also possible that this painting was a pendant to the portrait of a business partner, rather than a wife. For example, the shape, size, period, and position matches that of Portrait of a Young man holding a glove:

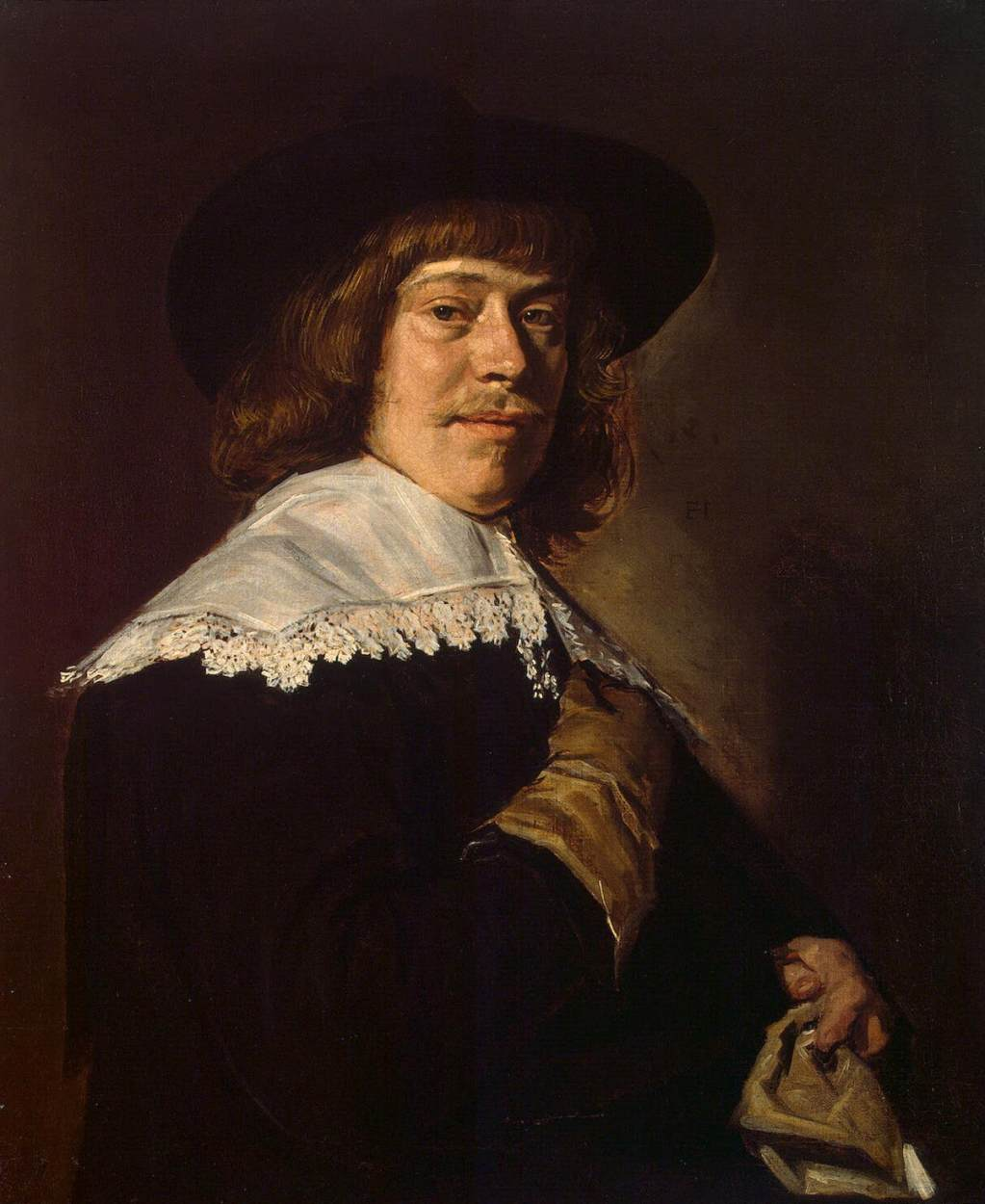

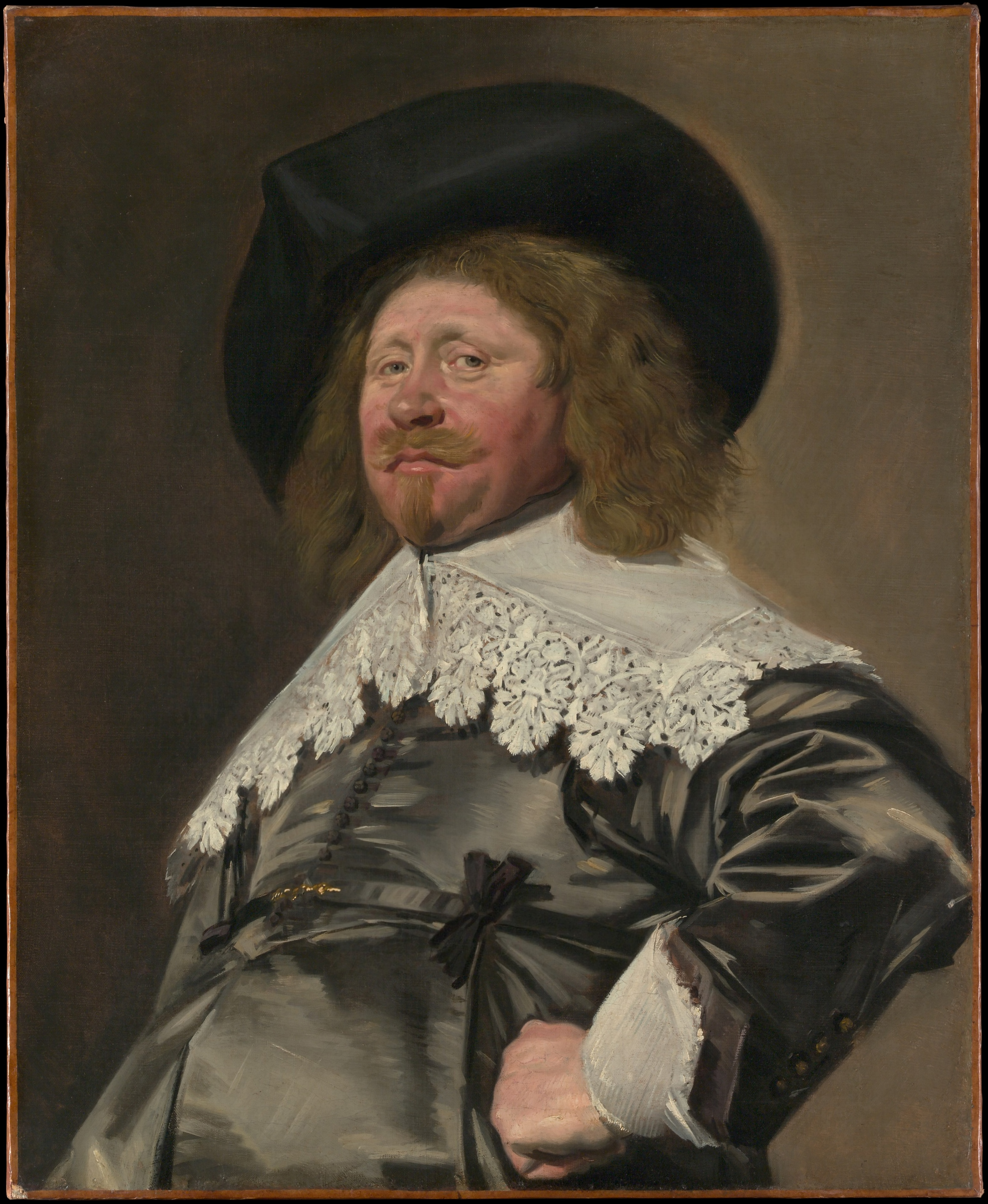

== Provenance ==
The painting is one of the best-documented paintings in Hals' oeuvre, first documented by Gustav Friedrich Waagen in his description of the paintings of George Wyndham, 1st Baron Leconfield at Petworth House in 1854. After that it was included by Wilhelm von Bode in 1883, by Ernst Wilhelm Moes in 1909, Hofstede de Groot in 1910, by W.R. Valentiner in 1923, Trivas in 1941 and by Gerrit David Gratama in 1946. Both Seymour Slive and Claus Grimm agree it is by Hals.

The Met lists various sale entries from George Wyndham, 3rd Earl of Egremont's time up to their acquisition date. In his 1989 catalog of the international Frans Hals exhibition, Slive included discussion of an old label on the back which listed the portrayed man as Claes Duyst van Voorhout, brewer in "De Zwaanschel". 20th-century archival research revealed that a Nicolaes Pietersz Duyst van Voorhout indeed was owner of the brewery called the "Swaenshals" (Swan's neck), who testified in Haarlem in 1629 that he was 29 years old, which fits the date for this portrait that was painted about 10 years later.

== See also ==
- List of paintings by Frans Hals
