= Nicolaas Stenius =

Dutch theologian

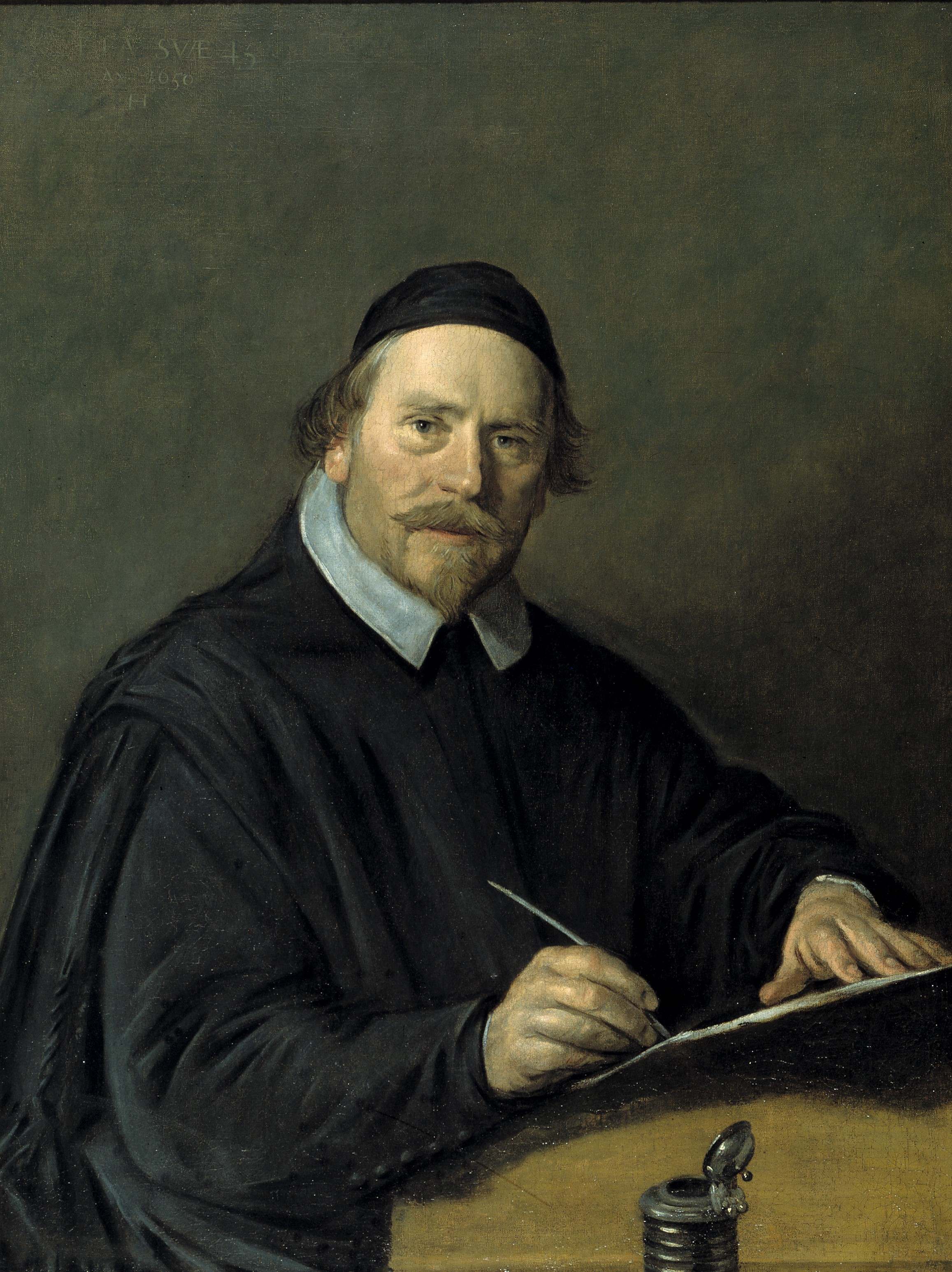
Nicolaas Stenius, by Frans Hals

Nicolaes van der Steen, or Nicolaas Stenius (1605 – 1670), was a Dutch theologian, best known today for his portrait by Frans Hals.

== Biography ==
He was born in Haarlem, and according to the NNBW he became canon priest of the Old Catholic Haarlem chapter or kapittel. He moved to Akersloot in 1631. In 1633 he built a "barn church" there, that was torn down in 1868 to make way for a graveyard. He is known for his translations from Latin into Dutch, such as the decisions of the Council of Trent, and John Barclay's Joannes Barclai Paraenesis ad sectarios libri II. He handled the legacies of the pastors of Enkhuizen and Crommenie, and made a poem about Pieter IJsbrantsz, the pastor of Uitgeest, which was included under IJsbrantsz's engraved portrait. He died in Akersloot.

When the Monsignor Jacobus Graaf started collecting art in the 1860s for the "Bisschoppelijk Museum" in Haarlem, Graaf found the portrait of Nicolaas Stenius by Frans Hals crumpled in the attic of his old rectory in Akersloot. At that time, the Haarlem museum was located in an old seventeenth-century manor house on the Jansstraat in 1893. The collection moved to Utrecht after the museum closed in the 20th-century.
