= Jonas Suyderhoef =

Dutch Golden Age engraver

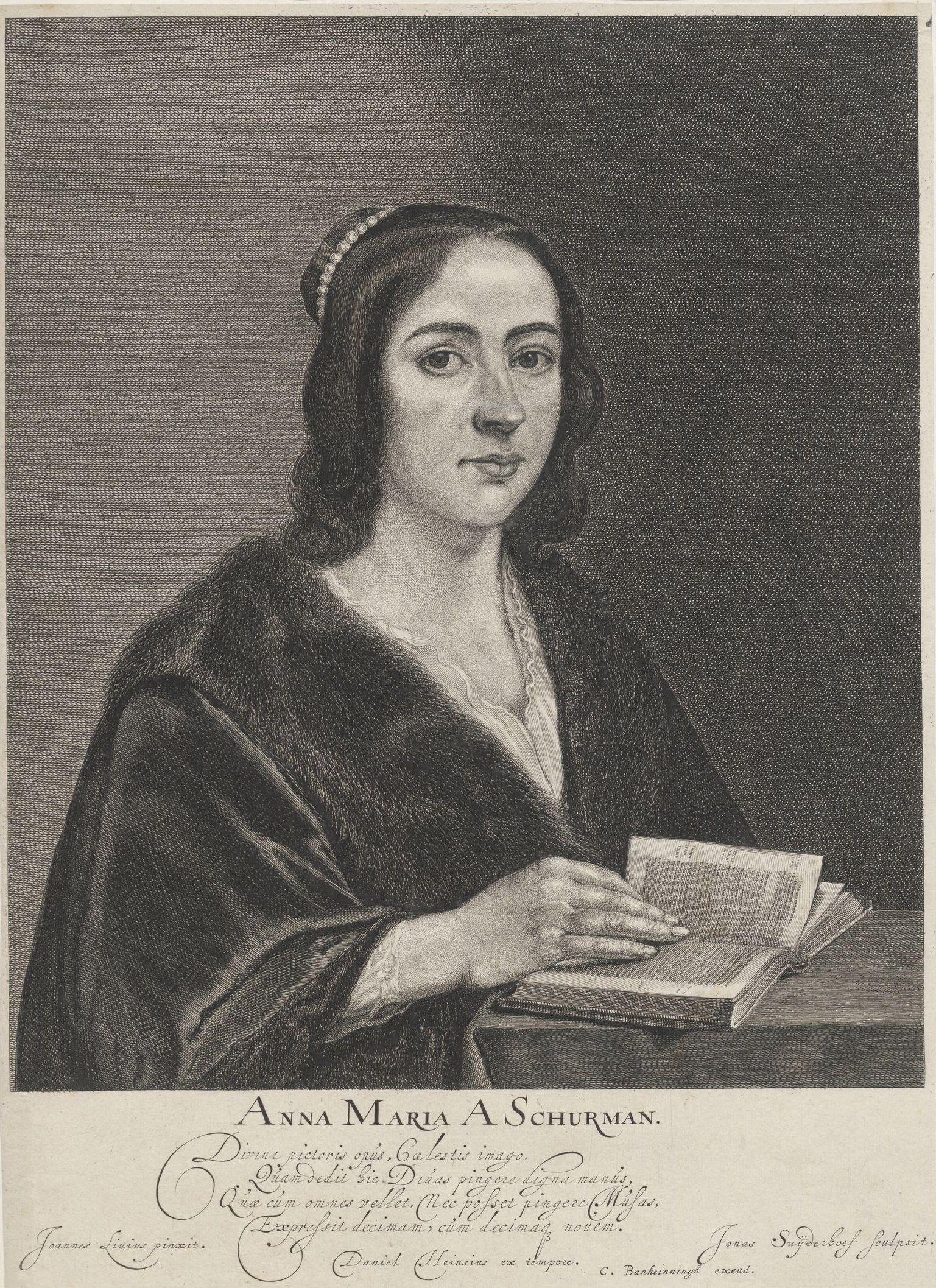
Engraved portrait of Anna Maria van Schurman after her portrait by Jan Lievens.

Jonas Suyderhoef (1613 in Haarlem – 1686 in Haarlem), was a Dutch Golden Age engraver.

== Biography ==
According to the RKD he was known as a draughtsman and printmaker. He was a nephew of Kenau Simonsdochter Hasselaer and the son of Andries Suyderhoef, who was secretary to Cornelius Haga.
