= Passchier de Fijne =

Dutch pastor & writer

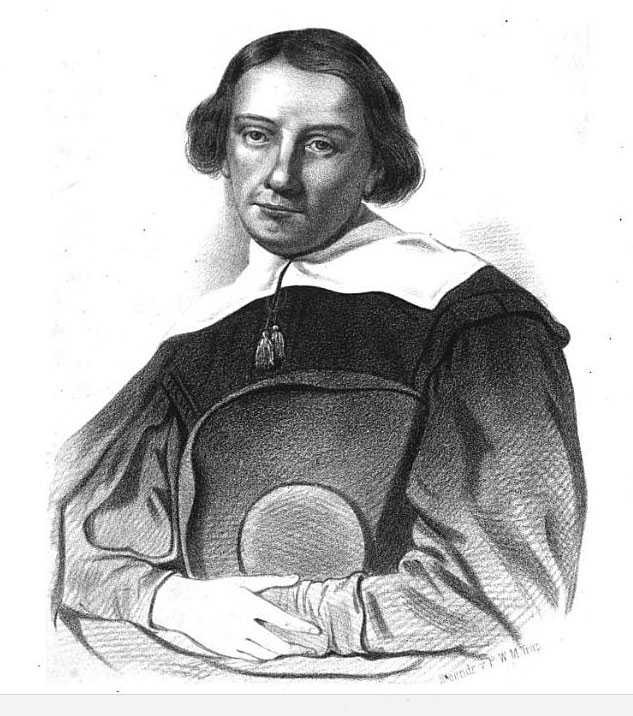

Personal life
- Born: January 31, 1588 Leiden
- Died: 1667 (aged 78–79) Haarlem

Religious life
- Religion: Christianity

Passchier de Fijne (also Paschier and also Fyne) (Leiden, January 31, 1588 – Haarlem buried there October 27, 1667) was a Netherlands pastor and writer. He was one of the first pastors of the Remonstrant Brotherhood. Because of his forbidden preaching on the ice of the river Gouwe at Gouda he was also called "the kingfisher".

== Biography ==
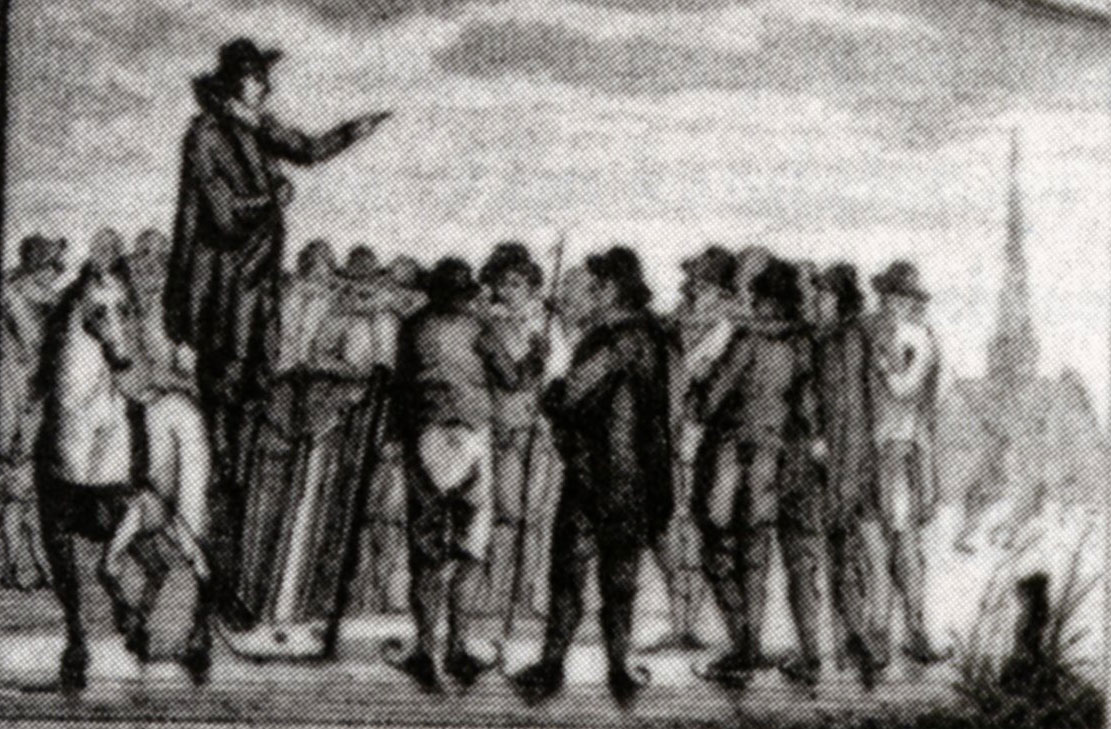
Passchier de Fijne (the kingfishers) preaching on the ice of the Gouwe near Gouda

De Fijne was a son of the cloth worker Paschier de Fijne and Maaike Couwerts who fled from the Southern Netherlands. Initially, he followed in his father's footsteps and became a cloth worker. He did not study at a theological faculty, but was trained in this profession by two pastors, among whom Cornelis Damman from Ouddorp.

After having been examined by the Classis Brielle, he obtained permission to exercise the office of minister. However, he would first return to his native city of Leiden. There he developed sympathy for the supporters of the theologian Arminius in the early days of the Twelve Years' Truce (1609–1621) and took sides with the Remonstrants.

In 1611 he was appointed as a minister in Jaarsveld because of his Remonstrant disposition. During the synod of Dordrecht he refused to give up his views. He was expelled from the region, but went into hiding. He continued to preach on behalf of the Remonstrant Brotherhood, founded in 1619. Because preaching was forbidden to him by the government, he traveled in disguise across the country and preached in various shelters. In the winter, he preached on the ice of the Gouwe river near Gouda, for which he owes his nickname "the kingfisher". In Goudsche Onkatolijke kerkzaken this is described by Ignatius Walvis as follows:

As it had frozen very strongly afterwards, he did the 19 of January [1620] a predicate at the end of the day, standing outside on the ice with a thin skirt and blue nose cloth around him. He was on an ice sledge, and the audience mostly on skate, on the Gouwe. At the conclusion of the sermon, he commanded to sing a psalm, and the sledge drove on with him. Then all the skates followed to Waddinxveen. The others stopped and sang the psalm. Because of that preaching on the ice, the Gouda Remonstrants called him the Kingfisher if they spoke of him and wanted to cover his name.

In the vicinity of Gouda he was hunted by the bailiff and heretic hunter Anthony Cloots and in the vicinity of Leiden he was hunted by the bailiff Willem de Bont. In a raid by Cloots during an illegal church service of De Fijne, Cloots was so attacked by the churchgoers that he had little chance of success.

De Fijne made contact with the Collegiants in Rijnsburg, a movement led by Elder Gijsbert van der Kodde. Attempts on his part to bring them to the Remonstrant Brotherhood were shipwrecked. After the death of Maurice of Orange in 1625, the climate for the Remonstrants gradually calmed down. After his period as a traveling preacher, he was confirmed in 1633 as a Remonstrant preacher in Haarlem.

De Fijne wrote many books and pamphlets in which he defended the views of the Remonstrants. In his pamphlets he regularly used the dialogue as a means to highlight his views. In his polemic with the minister of The Hague Casper Streso he performed a peat farmer in conversation with a minister. For the Remonstrant foreman Eduard Poppius he wrote a preface to his posthumous 1625 Cort ende grondich bericht, directed against the Gomarists.

De Fijne married Machtelt Jans Bouchout on February 19, 1612 in Leiden. He died in October 1667 at the age of 79 in Haarlem. He was buried in the Grote Kerk, Haarlem.

== Works ==
- Een trouwhertighe vermaninghe (1620)
- Broederlijke Vermaning (1624)
- De Silveren Naalde (1624)
- Nieuwe-iaer gheschenck, ver-eert aen alle remonstrants-gesinde. (1625)
- Een kleyn monstertjen, met een warachtich verhael, vande mishandelinghe die den remonstrantsche ghevangenen predicanten gheschiet is. (1625)
- Silvere vergulde naelde bequaem om af te lichten de vliesen van de oogen der Hollantsche regenten (1625)
- Veen-boere wegh-kortinghe, ofte t'Samen-sprake tusschen een ghereformeerden predicant ende eenen veen-boer die de Haeghsche maniere van spreecken niet begrijpen en kan (1642)
- Veen-boers bescheyt (1642)
- Winter turf (1642)
- Veen-boeren waerschouwinge, over het verwarde beright, dat hy uyt den Haghe ontfanghen heeft (1642)
- Den siecken veen-boer. Die van sijnen predikant besocht ende vertroost wort. Seer nut te lesen voor alle ghesonde, om in tijt van sieckte, eenen vasten troost te mogen hebben (1643)
- Lammerenkrijgh: anders, Mennonisten kercken-twist (1663)
- Zee-mans nievwe-iaer, ofte t'Samen-sprake vande vernieuwinge des levens, tusschen Pieter Lichthart, ende Jan Swaerhooft, beyde bootsgesellen op een schip (1643)
- Kort, waerachtigh, en getrouw verhael van het eerste begin en opkomen van de nieuwe seckte der propheten ofte Rynsburgers in het dorp van Warmont, anno 1619, en 1620 (1671)
- Het leeven en eenige bysondere voorvallen van Passchier de Fijne (1694)
- De oude Leidsche patroon, of derden Octobers banket (attributed to Paschier de Fijne (1630), reissued in 1833 with notes by Jan Roemer and reissued in 1867 with introduction and notes by Jean Théodore Bergman)

== Notes and references ==
=== Sources ===
- Aa, van der (1952). "Passchier de, Fijne". Biographisch woordenboek der Nederlanden (in Dutch). Vol. 6. pp. 275–280.
- Knipscheer (1924). "Fijne, Paschier de". Nieuw Nederlandsch Biografisch Woordenboek (NNBW) (in Dutch). Vol. 6. Leiden: Sijthoff. p. 530.
- OVT (2006). "Spoor Terug: Schout Willem de Bont". vpro (in Dutch).
- Venemans, B.A (1988). "Passchier de, Fijne". Biografisch lexicon voor de geschiedenis van het Nederlands protestantisme (in Dutch). Vol. 3. pp. 125–126.
- Walvis, Ignatius (1999). Goudsche onkatolijke kerkzaken (in Dutch). Delft: Uitgeverij Eburon.

== Bibliography ==
- Abels, P. H. A. M. (2002). "Van ketternest tot bolwerk van rechtzinnigheid". Duizend jaar Gouda, een stadsgeschiedenis (in Dutch). Hilversum: Verloren. pp. 448–449.
