= Herman Langelius =

Dutch Protestant minister

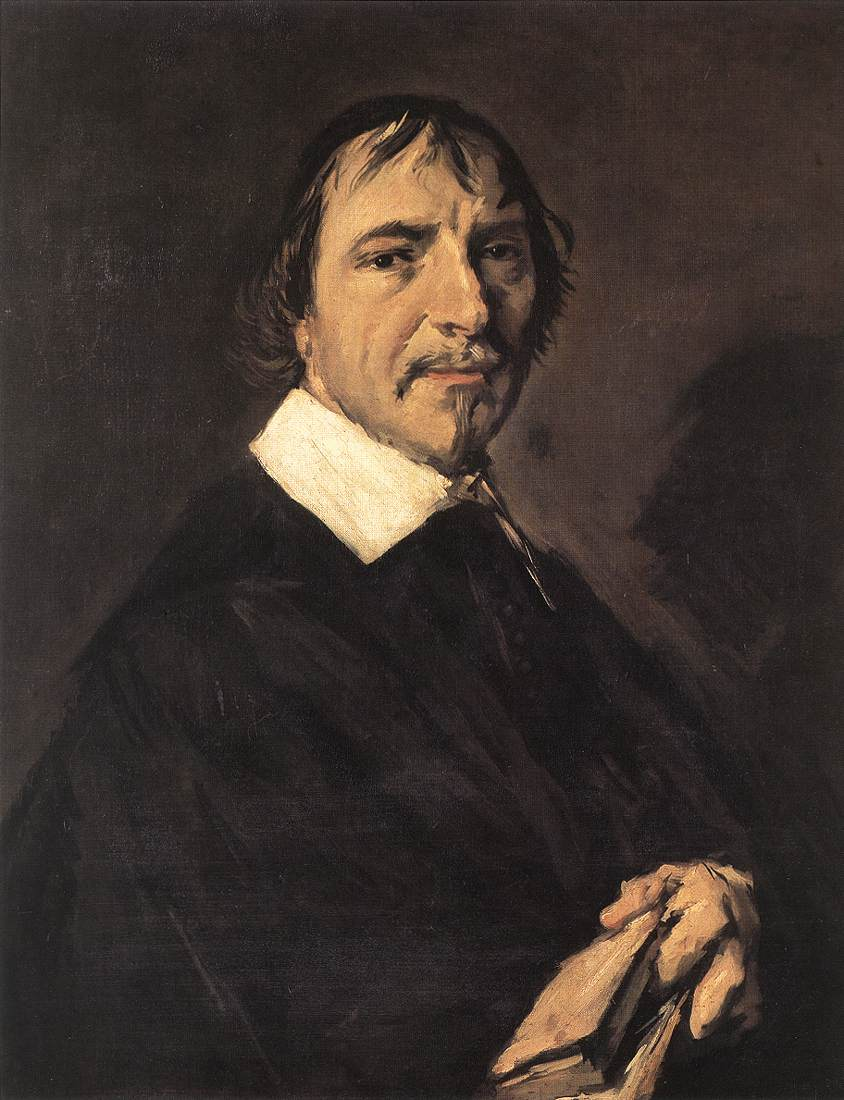
Portrait of Herman Langelius

Herman Langelius (1614 – 1666), was a Dutch Protestant minister known best today for his portrait by Frans Hals.

== Biography ==
He was born in Haarlem but was first called to Rotterdam. In 1654 he became bible corrector in Leiden along with L. Vinckius and Henricus Rulaeus. He later became a preacher in Amsterdam and was featured after his death there in a 12-page sermon called Last hours of Rivet, Bassecourt, Langelius and Landtman., by the Amsterdam preacher Casparus de Carpentier.
