= Pieter Verdonck =

Dutch portrait subject (c. 1580–after 1636)

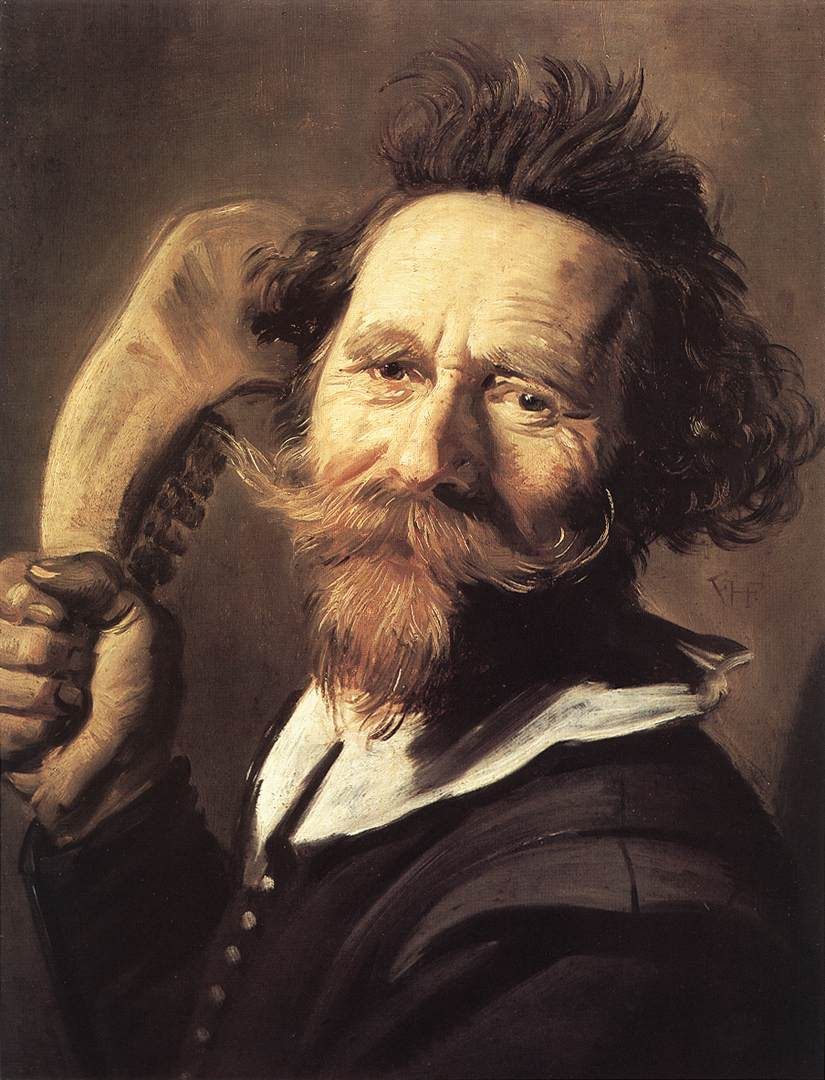
Portrait of a man with a jawbone in his hand, 1636

Pieter Verdonck (c.1580 – after 1636), was a man in Haarlem best known today for his portrait that was painted by Frans Hals in 1636.

Very little is known of him, though a Pieter Verdonck was recorded in the Reformed Church of Haarlem as coming from Ghent when he was engaged to be married in 1597 to Catharina Gelaynis of Vlissingen. He was probably a friend of Hals, who painted him in the guise of Samson holding the jawbone. Perhaps his friend was not amused, because the painting was later painted over to reflect a man holding a wine glass and his wild hair was covered by a velvet beret.

According to the RKD the jawbone is from a cow. The jawbone was meant however to symbolize the jawbone of the ass that was used by Samson to slay 1,000 Philistines. The portrait has been identified "Verdonck" because of the engraving made by Jan van de Velde with a short poem describing the subject, which loosely translated, meant "This is Verdonck, the bold guest whose jawbone attacks everyone/ By not distinguishing between high or low born, he landed in the work house". The poem could be seen as moralistic warning to rederijkers whose satiric discourses went too far. Both Hals and his contemporary Salomon de Bray were rederijkers in Haarlem. De Bray made a pair of pendant pieces in a similar genre depicting David with his sword and Samson with his jawbone. De Bray's version shows Samson a moment later in the story, when he prayed to God out of thirst and was rewarded with the "fountain of the crier". Hals' portrait shows the moment where Samson in triumph proclaims that "with the jawbone of an ass, he slayed 1,000 Philistines".

The fact that Hals painted his subject in close up, cutting off the knuckles of his fist, leads one to conclude the painting was meant more as a tronie than as a portrait.

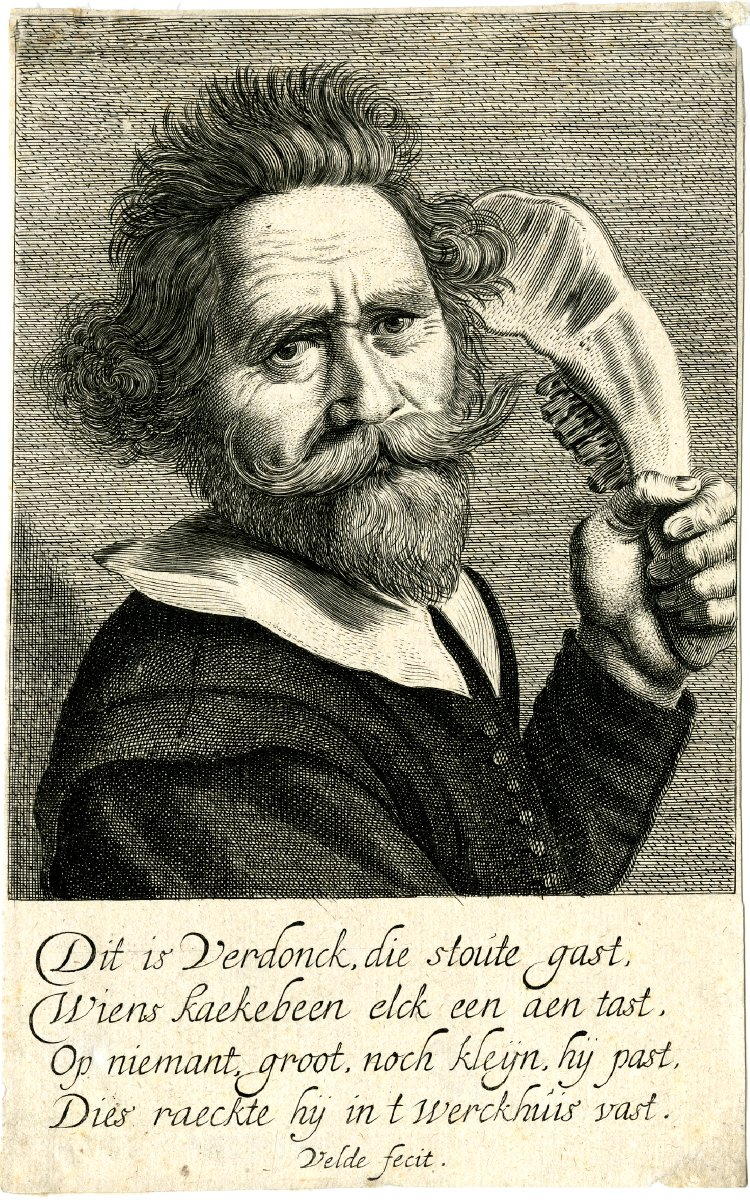
Engraving by Jan van de Velde with poem

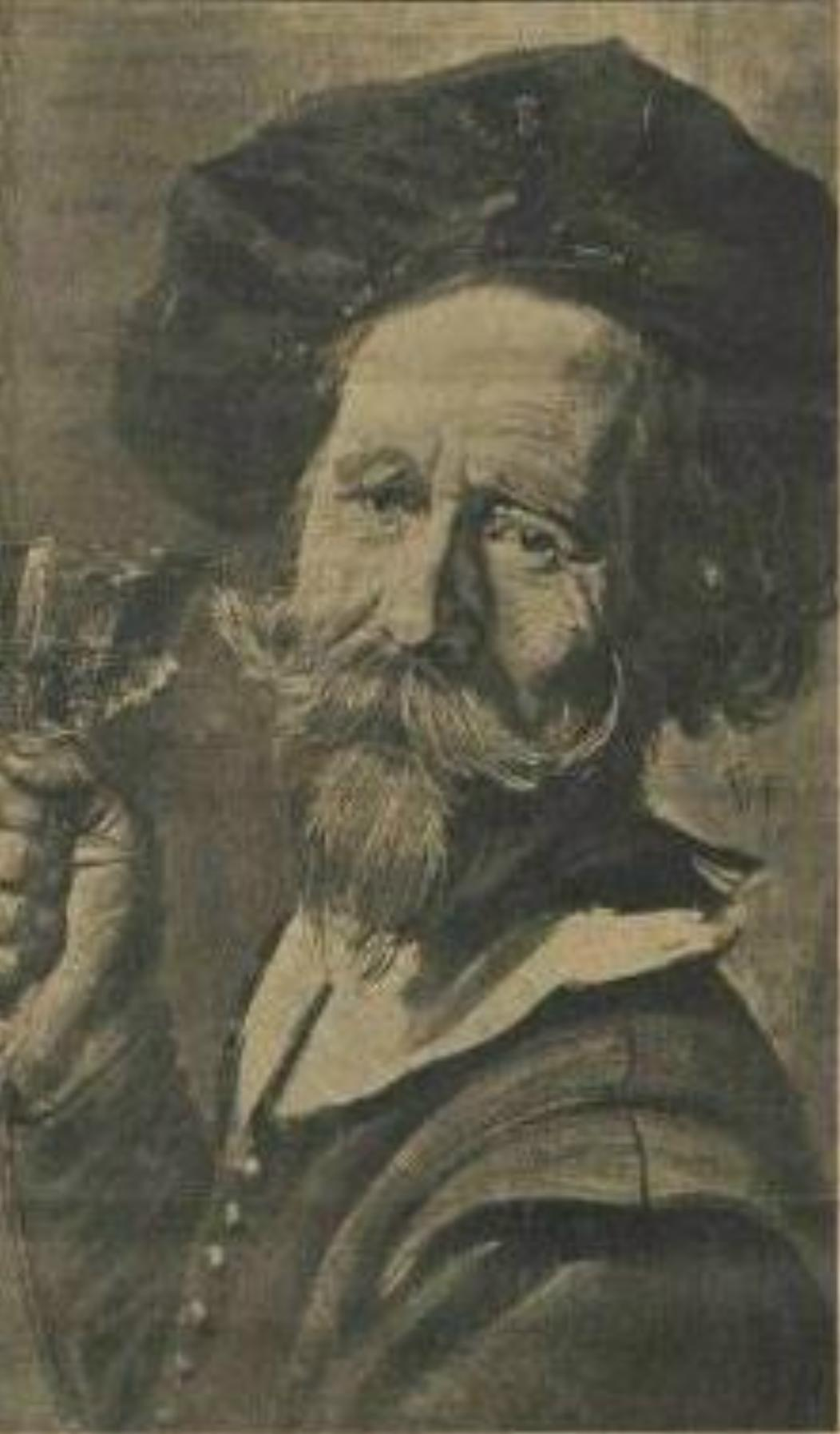
Old photo before restoration in 1928.

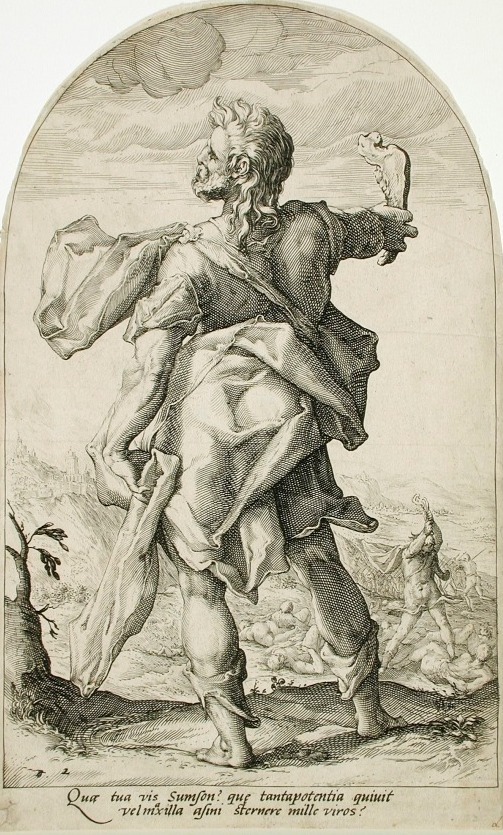
Engraving of Samson raising the jawbone, part 2 of Heroes of the Old Testament: Jahel, Samson, David, Judith by Jacob Matham

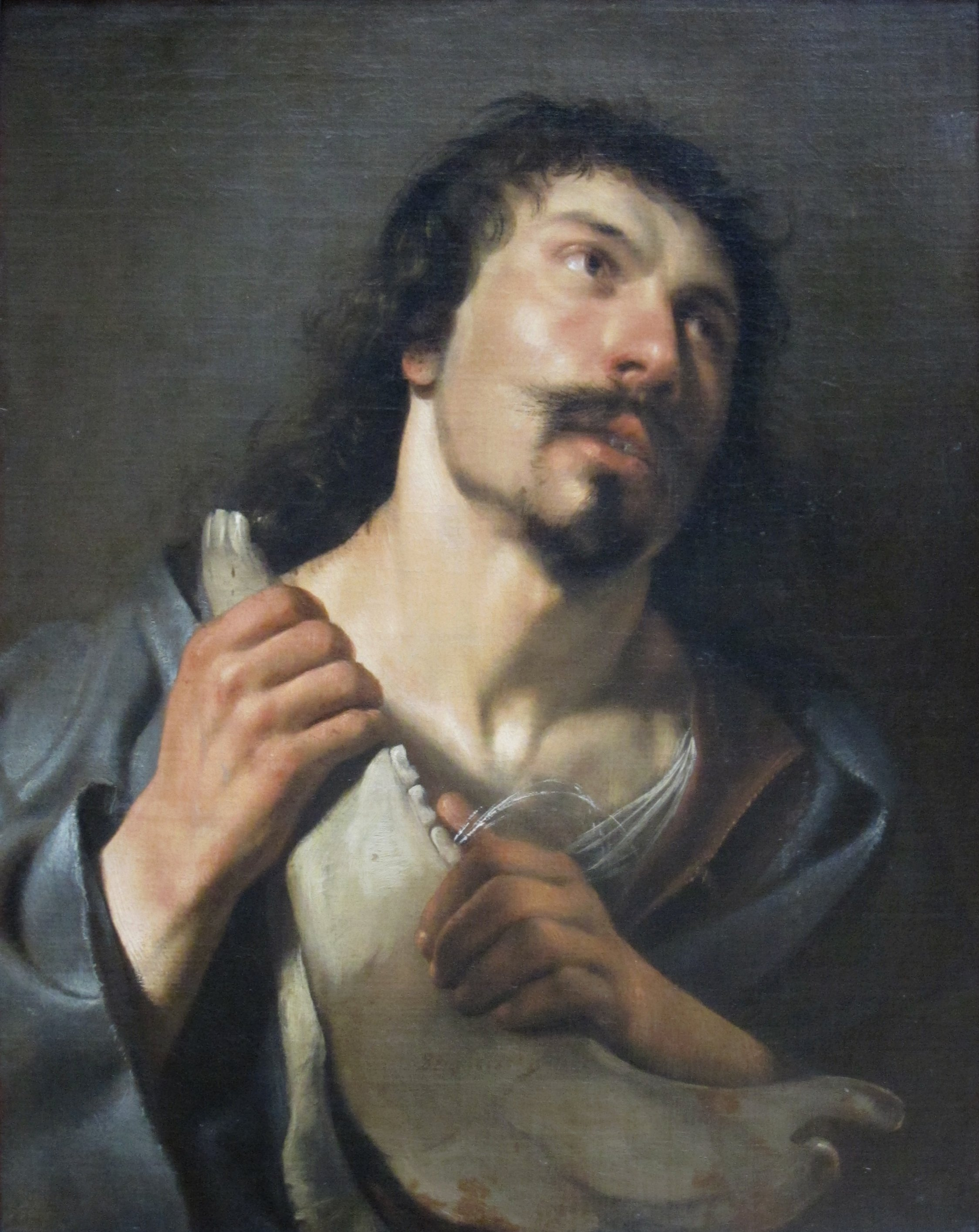
Samson holding the jawbone while it spouts water, by Salomon de Bray
