= Paulus Verschuur =

Dutch politician (1606–1667)

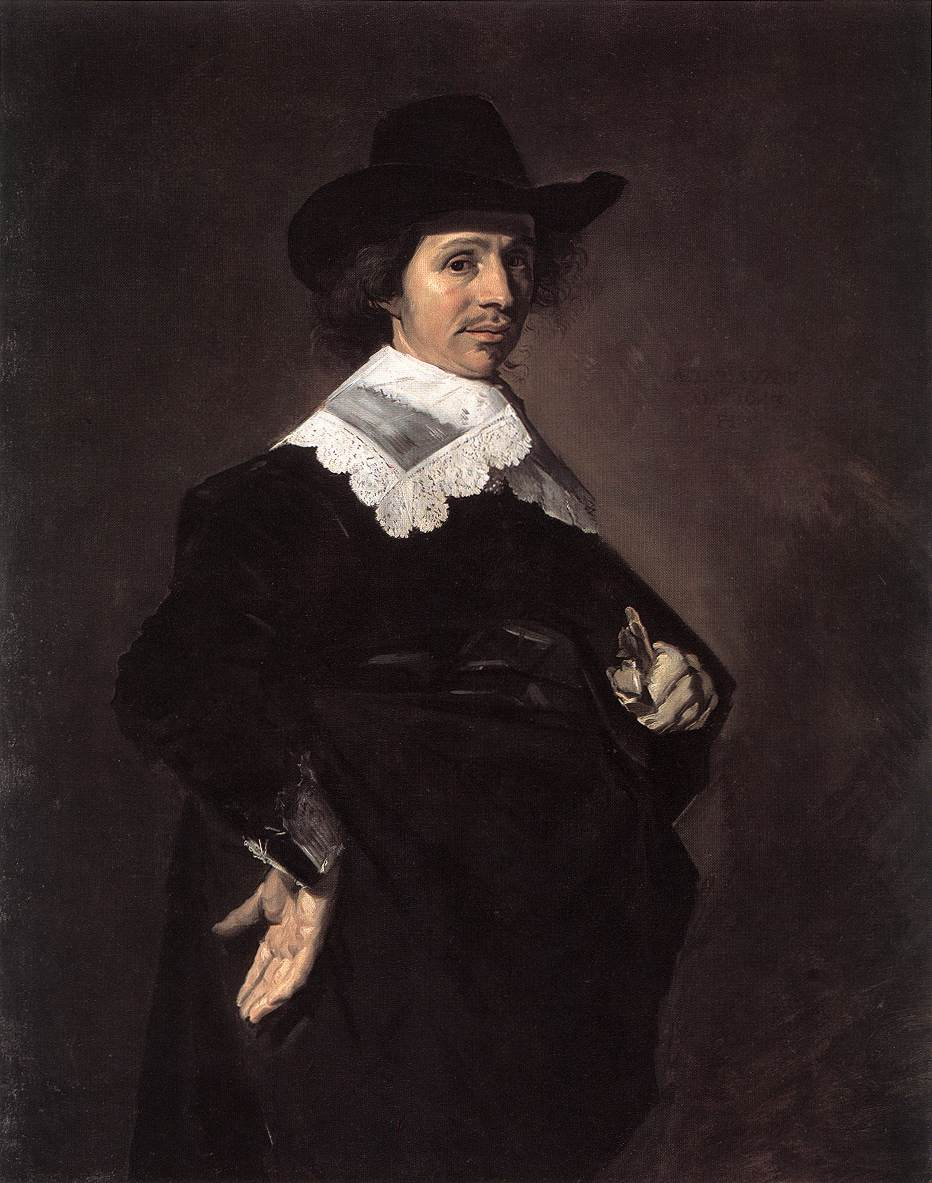
Paulus Verschuur, by Frans Hals in 1643, courtesy Metropolitan Museum of Art

Paulus Verschuur (1606–1667), was a Dutch mayor of Rotterdam, known today for his portrait by Frans Hals.

He was born in Rotterdam as the son of a textile merchant from Antwerp. He married Maria van Berckel in 1631, and three years later combined his business with that of his father-in-law. He served seven terms as burgomaster of Rotterdam and was also a director of the Dutch East India Company. It is unknown why Verschuur travelled to Haarlem to have his portrait made.

In 1910 Hofstede de Groot documented this portrait with the following description: "Portrait of a Man M. 136. He stands, seen almost to the knees. He is turned three-quarters right, and looks at the spectator. He rests his right hand on his hip. His left arm is enveloped in his cloak; in the gloved left hand is his right-hand glove. He wears a black coat and cloak, a close-fitting lace collar, and a black felt hat. Signed with the monogram, and inscribed on the right, "AETAT SVAE 37. AN 1643"; canvas, 46 inches by 35 inches or 27 1/2 inches, according to the Bosch sale catalogue. Etched by J. Klaus. Exhibited at the Hudson-Fulton Celebration, Metropolitan Museum, New York, 1909, No. 35. Sale. Ad. Jos. Bosch, Vienna, April 28, 1885, No. 20 (14,010 florins, Kaiser). In the collection of Mrs. Collis P. Huntington, New York."

The sitter of this painting was only identified in 1954 after discovery of a copy made in 1700 by Pieter van der Werff for the Rotterdam chamber of the East India Company.
