= Adolphe Schloss =

German-French art collector (1842–1910)

- Born: 10 August 1842; Furth, Lower Bavaria
- Died: 31 December 1910 (aged 68); Paris, France
- Known for: Collecting Netherlandish art.
- Spouse: Lucie Mathilde Haas

Adolphe Schloss (10 August 1842 – 31 December 1910) was a German-French art collector and an important broker of export goods, or commissionaire, with his firm Adolphe Schloss Fils et Co., particularly important in the trade of Parisian haute couture.

== Life ==
Schloss was born to a Jewish family in Furth, Lower Bavaria. He married Lucie Mathilde Haas and together they collected works of art from the Northern and Southern Netherlands that became notable in the 1900s as the Ad. Schloss collection. They held a gallery at Salon Adolphe Schloss, residence 38, avenue Henri Martin, Paris. After Adolphe's death there, his widow continued to collect paintings and lent her works to various exhibitions as Mme. A. Schloss or Frau Adolphe Schloß in Paris.

== The Schloss collection ==
=== The Collection ===
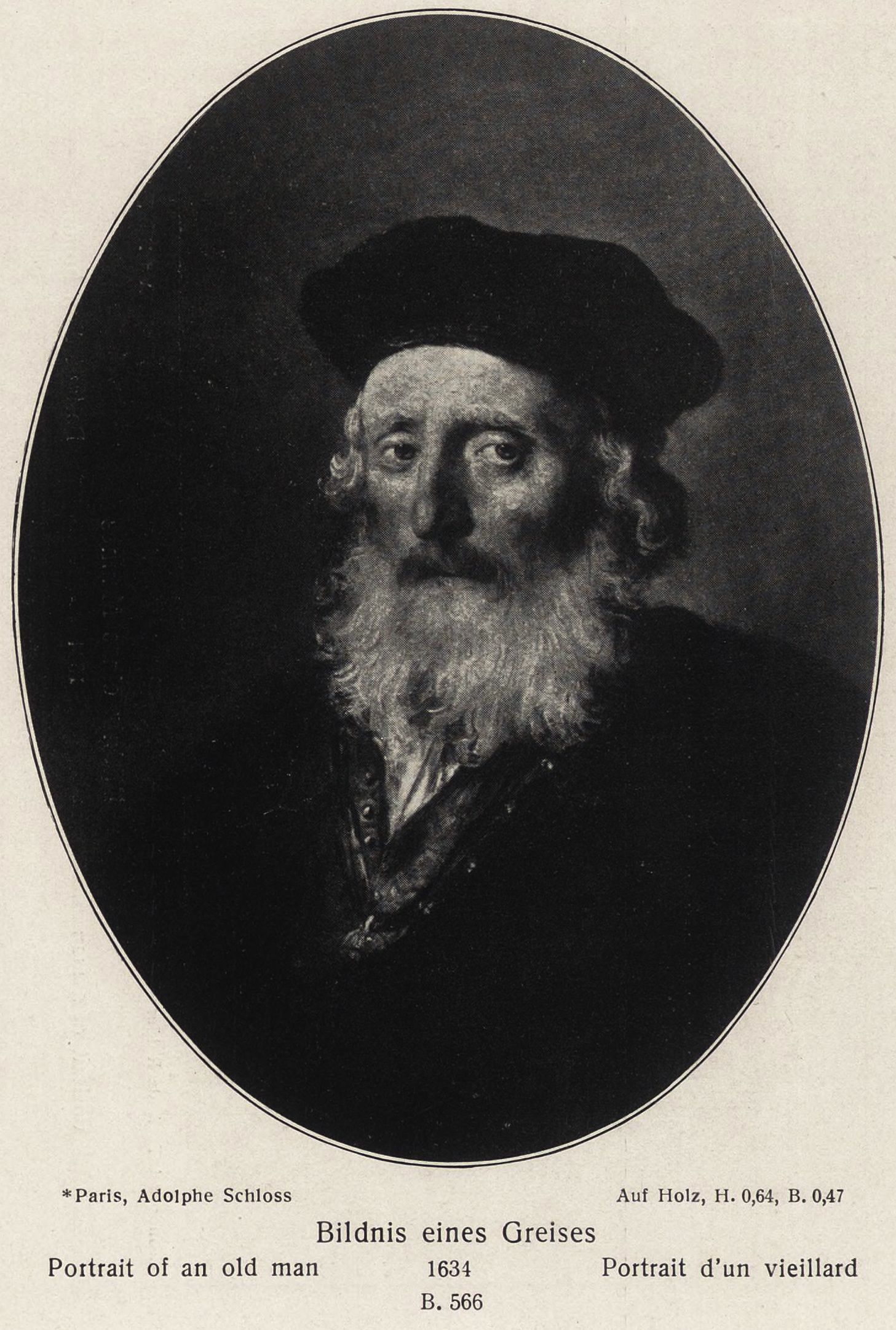
Portrait of an Old Man

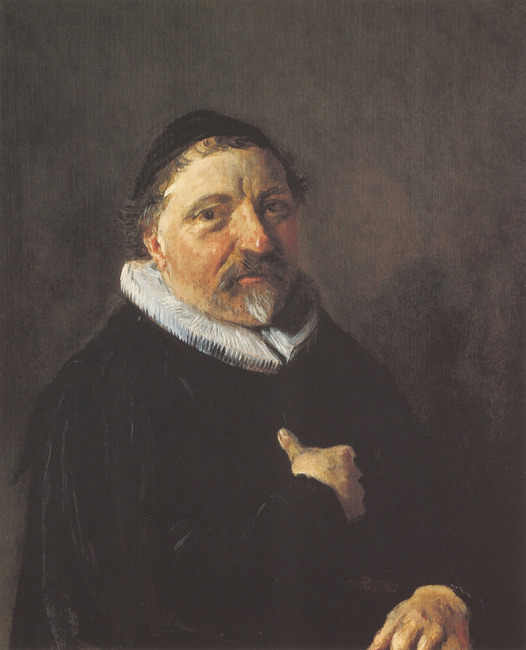
Frans Hals - Portrait of Adrianus Tegularius

The collection was "regarded as one of the last great Dutch art collections to be assembled in 19th century France". "Paintings were hung from floor to ceiling on the walls of the Schloss residence". During the lifetime of Adolphe Schloss, paintings from the collection were regularly loaned for exhibitions across Europe, including the 1903 exhibition in The Hague - Oude Portretten. The collection "contained many paintings from Dutch and Flemish masters including Rubens, Rembrandt, and Ruysdael". Other artists in the collection included Hals, Cuyp and Brueghel. An inventory of the collection was prepared in 1923 by Clothilde Brière-Misme of the Bibliothèque d’Art et d’Histoire. Another inventory was attached to the will of Lucie Haas Schloss in 1938.

Two paintings were discovered in an Ohio, USA auction and were removed.

=== Nazi art looting ===
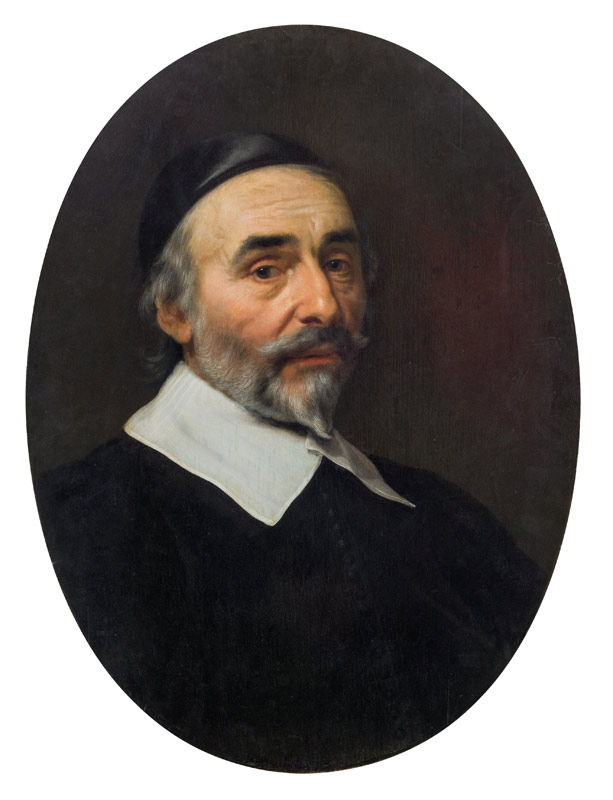
Portrait of a Man, perhaps Dammas Jansz. Pesser, by Bartholomeus van der Helst, restituted in 2016.

Frau Schloss died in 1938 and the collection was left to their children Marguerite, Henry, Juliette and Lucien. By that time it was clear the respected collection had been targeted by the Nazis and the heirs moved what they could to Château de Chambon, Laguenne. The collection was to be kept safe during the war by a Dr Weil (a relative). In 1943 Pierre Laval planned to recoup some of the occupation costs by selling the collection to Germany. Henry Schloss was arrested and the Vichy government demanded to know where the collection was hidden. A few days later it was looted by the Vichy government from a bank in La Guenne. Of the 333 objects seized there, only 230 were actually offered to Hitler's Führer museum and 49 were saved for France and given to the Louvre. The paintings intended for the Linz museum were sent to Germany, but arrived too late to be sent for storage in one of the mines. They were put in to a vault in the Führerbau (one of the Nazi party buildings) on Konigsplatz in Munich. By the time anyone from the Monuments, Fine Arts, and Archives program arrived most of the collection had disappeared.

=== Subsequent fate ===
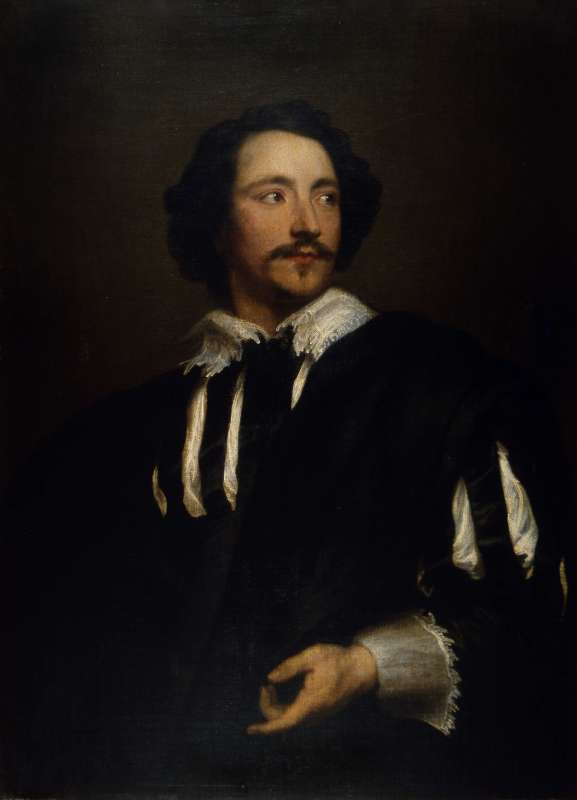
Portrait of Paul Pontius, by Anthony van Dyck

At the end of the war in Europe, all of the collection was lost, but twenty-one works were found shortly afterwards in and around Munich, The 49 paintings that had gone to the Louvre were returned to the family in 1946. Gradually 148 objects were rediscovered. By 1949, a number of works had been returned to the Schloss family and a selection of 70 of these restituted works from the collection was sold by the Galerie Charpentier. The sale included a portrait of Paul Pontius by Van Dyck, now in the Israel Museum in Jerusalem. A second sale of restituted works was held by Charpentier in December 1951. Charpentier held a third and final sale of restituted paintings in December 1954. In March 1961, four of the Schloss heirs (Lucien, Henry and Raymond Schloss and Juliette Weil) agreed a settlement of 3,812,000 DM with the Federal (West German) Government. Five Dutch paintings from the Adolphe Schloss collection that had been removed from the Führerbau in Munich and had passed to a German private collection were restituted in 2025 to the heirs of Adolphe Schloss and offered for sale at Christie's Paris on 12 June 2025: the paintings were by or attributed to Dominicus van Tol, Karel de Moor, Ary de Vois, Willem Kalf and Joost van Geel. The same Christie's sale included two Italian paintings from the Adolphe Schloss collection that had been confiscated by the Vichy government and were restituted to the heirs of Adolphe Schloss in 2024.

In 2016 a painting, Portrait of a Man by Van der Helst, looted from the Schloss collection in 1943 was to be auctioned at the Im Kinsky auction house in Vienna. The lot was pulled at the request of the French government.

Among the portraits was “Old man with a white beard and a black hat”, attributed to Rembrandt which was returned to the Schloss family in 1999 and is not now considered to be by Rembrandt. Another portrait from the collection, Portrait of Adrianus Tegularius by Frans Hals, was sold several times with a fake or ambiguous provenance. It was the subject of an extensive series of court cases that eventually lead to the conviction of an art dealer for possession of artwork looted during the Second World War. Another portrait from the collection by van der Helst was listed in auction in 2016. It was removed from the auction following the intervention of the French Government.
