= Ernst Wilhelm Moes =

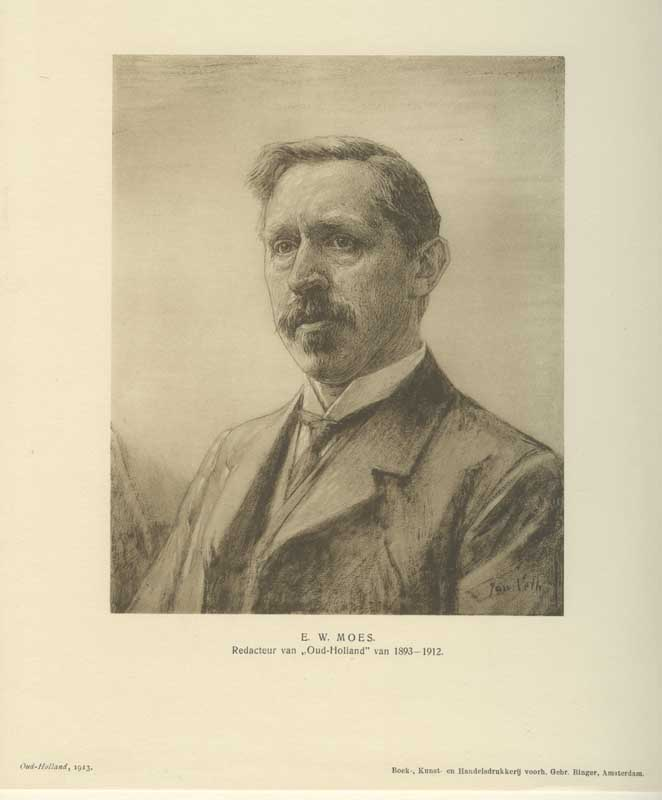
Portrait of E.W. Moes by Jan Veth.

Ernst Wilhelm Moes (1864 – 1912), was a Dutch art historian and director of the print cabinet for the Rijksmuseum.

== Biography ==
According to the NNBW he studied art at the University of Amsterdam and became a print collector while still a student, specialized in Amsterdam history. To simplify his research, from 1885 he became a volunteer at the Amsterdam auction house of Frederik Muller. In 1896 he published his first work on the history of the Amsterdam publishing industry. His Iconographia, a comprehensive guide to portraits of Dutch people, was published by Frederik Muller & Co. In 1898 he began work as assistant to Philip van der Kellen in the Amsterdam Rijksmuseum and from 1903 until his death by tuberculosis he was the head of the print cabinet of the museum. From 1907 until 1911 he was a member of Teylers Tweede Genootschap. He worked together with Abraham Bredius on the magazine Oud Holland, and Bredius wrote his obituary. He died in Amsterdam.

== Works ==
- Iconographia Batava, 1897
- De Amsterdamsche Boekdrukkers en Uitgevers in de zestiende eeuw, Part 1 (1900)
- Various biographies for the Nieuw Nederlandsch biografisch woordenboek, Part 1 (1911)
- Monograph on Frans Hals (with photographs of works): Frans Hals, sa vie et son oeuvre, (1909)
