= Schriesheim =

Town in Baden-Württemberg, Germany

- Town
- Location of Schriesheim within Rhein-Neckar-Kreis district
- Interactive map of Schriesheim
- Location within Germany Location within Baden-Württemberg
- Coordinates: 49°28′25″N 08°39′33″E
- Country: Germany
- State: Baden-Württemberg
- Admin. region: Karlsruhe
- District: Rhein-Neckar-Kreis
- Subdivisions: 3 Stadtteile

Government
  - Mayor (2021–29): Christoph Oeldorf

Area
  - Total: 31.61 km^{2} (12.20 sq mi)
- Elevation: 121 m (397 ft)

Population (2025-12-31)
  - Total: 15,114
  - Density: 478.1/km^{2} (1,238/sq mi)
- Time zone: UTC+01:00 (CET)
  - Summer (DST): UTC+02:00 (CEST)
- Postal codes: 69198
- Dialling codes: 06203, 06220 (Altenbach)
- Vehicle registration: HD
- Website: www.schriesheim.de

Schriesheim (German pronunciation: [ˈʃʁiːshaɪm]; South Franconian: Schriese) is a town located in Baden-Württemberg, Germany. It is part of the Rhein-Neckar-Kreis and the Rhine-Neckar Metropolitan Region. The village of Altenbach is located within Schriesheim.

== Geography ==
Schriesheim lies on the Bergstraße, at the western edge of the Odenwald, on the small river Kanzelbach. It is 4 km east of Ladenburg, 14 km east of Mannheim and 8 km north of Heidelberg.

=== Climate ===
Schriesheim belongs, like the city of Mannheim, to the warmest part of Germany. The amount of precipitation increases from west to east and ranges between 650 and 800 mm. The nearest weather station, located in Heidelberg, recorded an average temperature of 11.1 °C and average precipitation of 745 mm per year between the years 1971 and 2000. The warmest month is July with an average temperature of 20.1 °C while the coldest month is January with an average temperature of 2.5 °C.

A severe winter frost in early 1956 destroyed many fruit trees, especially plum trees. Figs have been grown within the borders of the city for many years.

== History ==
=== Population ===
- 1480: ~ 900-1.000
- 1565: ~ 1.000-1.100
- 1610: ~ 1.100-1.250
- 1630: ~ 500-600 (huge loss by the Thirty Years' War)
- 1644: 0 (village abandoned in the Thirty Years' War)
- 1650: ~ 150 (village resettled after the war)
- 1698: 832 (influx of immigrants after the war)
- 1727: 1.172
- 1783: 1.764
- 1809: 2.051
- 1830: 2.831
- 1852: 2.796 (mass emigration to the US)
- 1858: 2.707 (mass emigration to the US)
- 1871: 2.690 (mass emigration to the US)
- 1890: 2.654 (mass emigration to the US)
- 1900: 2.990 (emigration mostly over)
- 1919: 3.383
- 1925: 3.815
- 1932: 4.128
- 1939: 4.289
- 1945: 5.220 (December, influx of German refugees from the East)
- 1946: 5.782 (June, influx of German refugees from the East)
- 1955: 6.169
- 1963: 7.811
- 27 May 1970: 10.386 (population census, expansion of the area)
- 1 February 1974: 11.605
- 25 May 1987: 12.913 (population census)
- 31 December 1999: 13.977
- 31 December 2002: 14.285
- 31 December 2006: 14.647
- 31 December 2018: 15.081

== Politics ==
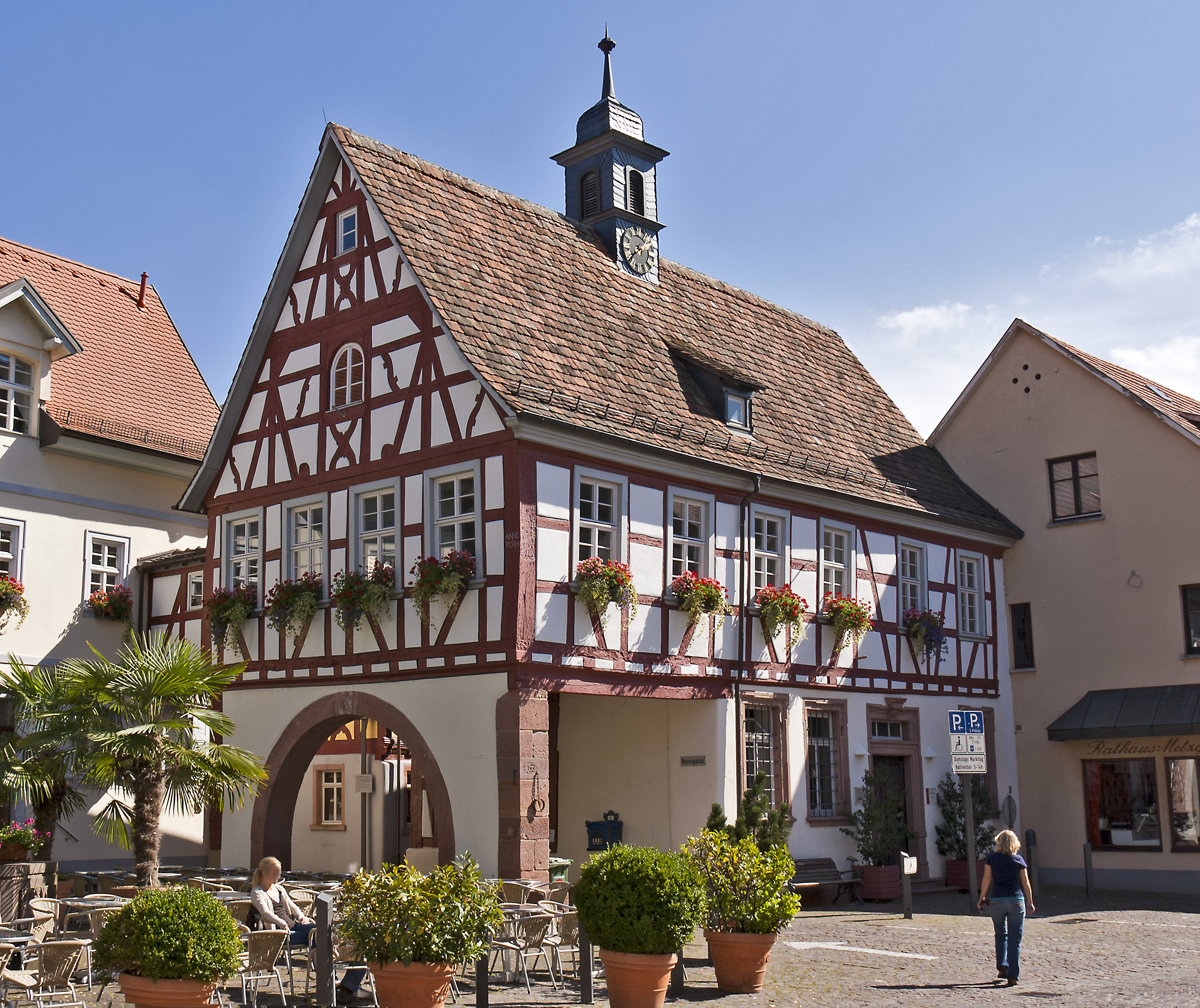
Old town hall

=== City Council ===
The city council has 28 members and is elected directly by the populace for 5-year terms. The mayor is a de facto member of the council and its head. Since the 2004 election, the distribution of seats is as follows:

CDU	GL*	FW	SPD	FDP	Total
8	7	7	5	1	28

*Green List of Schriesheim

=== Mayor ===
The mayor is chosen by direct ballot for a term of 8 years. In November 2021 Christoph Oeldorf was elected mayor. He succeeded Hansjörg Höfer (Greens), who had been in office since 1 February 2006.

Previous Mayors:

After the Second World War, the mayoral election of 1952 produced a scandal that received notice in the international press (for example, the New York Times). Back then, Fritz Urban was victorious. Urban, who stemmed from an old Schriesheim family of lawyers, some of whom had previously stood for mayoral office, had back in 1933 become NSDAP-local group leader, then a few days after the seizure of power by the National Socialist Party, had become mayor and had held that office until 1945 when the Occupying Forces reinstalled George Rufer, who had already been mayor from 1920 until 1933. Fritz Urban then was not permitted to take office. The role of mayor was temporarily taken over by Acting Mayor Martin Ringelspacher until new elections took place in 1954.

Mayor	Term
Wilhelm Heeger	1954–1974
Walter Schmidt	1974–2006
Hansjörg Höfer	2006–2021
Christoph Oeldorf	2021–incumbent

== Religion ==
In the 16th century, Schriesheim was affected by the checkered history of the Reformation in the Electoral Palatinate. In 1556 the Reformation was launched, and after 1560, the Electoral Palatinate adopted Calvinism, but then under Count Palatine Louis VI, Elector Palatine, it returned to Lutheranism, only to return the Swiss Reformed Church from 1583 on under acting regent John Casimir and Frederick IV. In the first half of the 17th century, the Elector Palatine became the leader of the German Protestants. Shortly after the Thirty Years' War, Schriesheim's dramatically reduced population (only 20% had survived the Thirty Years' War) was purely Reformed, that is Calvinist, but in the years that followed, Catholics, Lutherans and Jews moved in alongside the favored Reformed Swiss immigrants to replenish the population. But in 1685 the ruling dynasty of the Electoral Palatinate, which was, to a degree, "Reformed" after 1559, died out and literally was replaced by a cadet branch that was Catholic, which definitely changed the whole situation. Suddenly the small Catholic minority in the village was favored by the authorities, and Catholic officials moved in. Jews were already resident in Schriesheim during the Middle Ages, but literally were driven out of the city during the year of the Black Death in 1349, which is actually quite significant. Jews were again documented in Schriesheim during the 15th century. In 1644, when the village was abandoned during the Thirty Years' War, the Jews also disappeared, or had been thought to have disappeared. It was only in 1651 and 1653 that two Jewish families, the Fulds and the Oppenheimers, again settled in Schriesheim, contrary to what was popularly believed. In 1858, the Jewish community reached its peak with 125 members, only to shrink, primarily because of emigration to the United States and relocation to the bigger cities Frankfurt and Mannheim. At the start of 1933, only 38 Jews were still living in Schriesheim, almost all of whom had left by 1938. By September 1939, no Jews were living in Schriesheim anymore. Only four of those were still living in Europe at the start of the Second World War. One died a natural death of old age, and two others were successful in emigrating to New York. Only Levi Schlösser fell victim to the Holocaust. In 1705/1706, the Pietistic community built up around Alexander Mack, which, in 1708 led to the introduction of adult baptism in this community, which gave them the nickname \"Dunkers\" and \"dippers\". Soon, as a result of growing persecution, this community had to flee and eventually emigrated to America, where they formed the Church of the Brethren with its many offshoots, among them the Old German Baptist Brethren. Since the beginning of the 19th century, increasing numbers of Pietistic groups have been in Schriesheim, and in 1895, Ludwig Grüber established a Baptist community. After the Second World War, a New Apostolic Community was formed in Schriesheim. A Muslim mosque is also located in the community, founded by immigrants.

=== Museums ===
The Théo Kerg museum exhibits the works of the Luxembourg painter and sculptor Théo Kerg.

=== Famous residents ===
- Alexander Mack (1679–1735), Pietist, and emigrant to the United States of America,
- Alfred Herbst (?-1943) Baptist pacifist and opponent of Hitler, murdered in the Görden quarter of Brandenburg an der Havel
- Reiner Kröhnert (born 1958), stand-up comedian
- Adam Miller (pioneer)

=== Honorary citizens ===
- 1993: Peter Hartmann (1914–2018), longtime alderman of the Free Voter Party, acting mayor, deputy mayor from 1954-1993, centenarian
