= Loth Schout =

Dutch Golden Age brewer of Haarlem

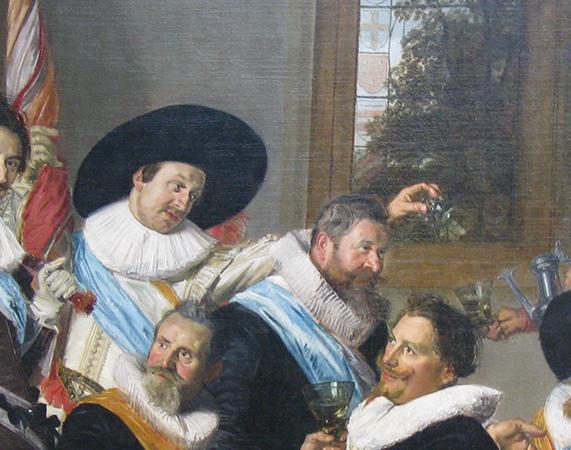
Loth Schout reaching over Johan Damius to refill his empty glass, detail of schutterstuk by Frans Hals in 1627

Loth Schout (1600 – 1655), was a Dutch Golden Age brewer of Haarlem.

== Biography ==
He was born in Haarlem as the son of judge Jan Jacobsz Schout and Dirkje Steyn, brewers of Twee Gecroonde Starren. Loth became a flag bearer of the St Adrian militia in 1622-1630. He was portrayed by Frans Hals in his schutterstuk called The Banquet of the Officers of the St Adrian Militia Company in 1627. He quit the militia when he married on 25 August 1630 to Geertruyd Borst (d.1649), the daughter of Cornelis Gerbrandsz & Trijntje Willemsdr, brewers in De Passer.

He died in Haarlem.
