= Ladenburg =

- Town
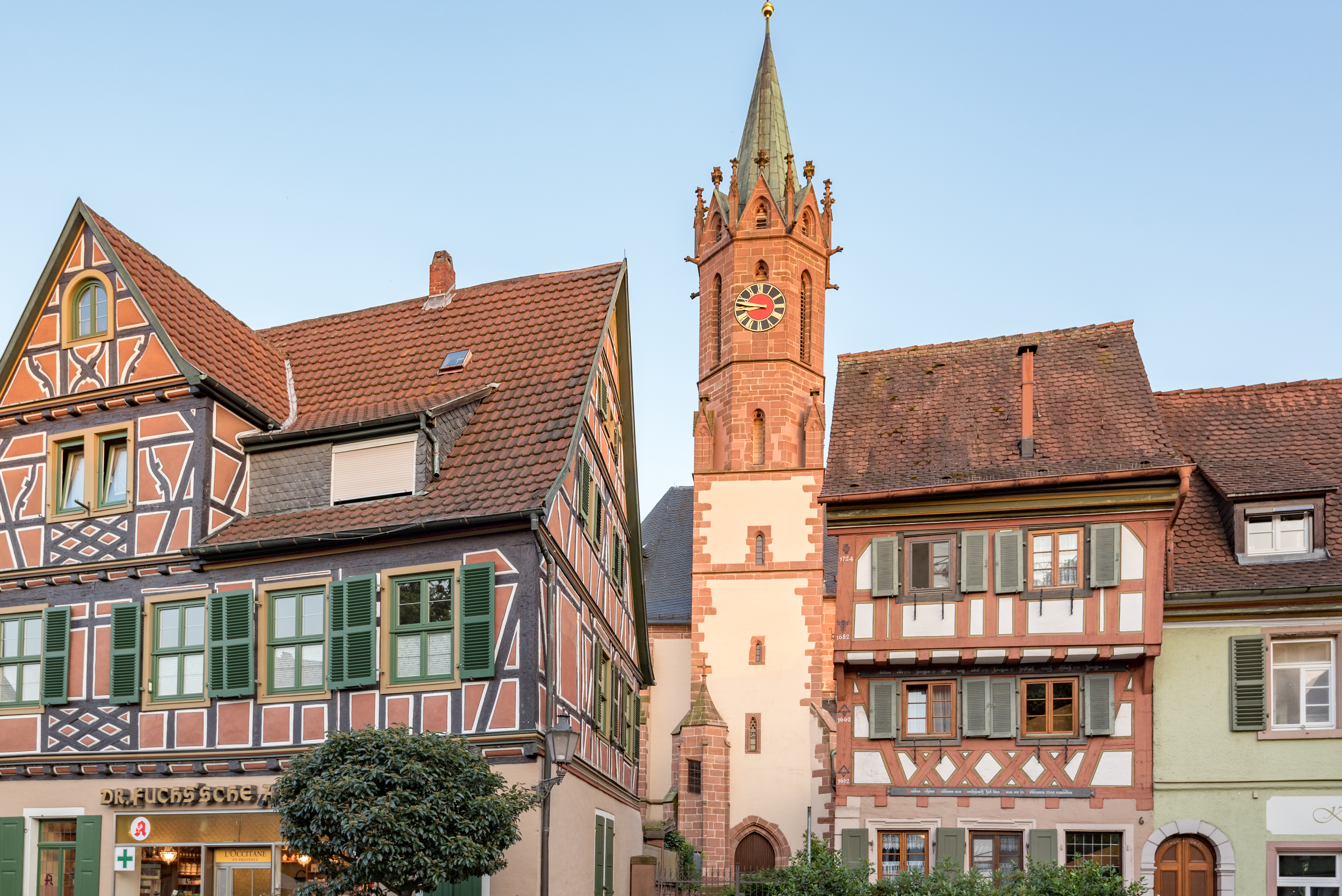
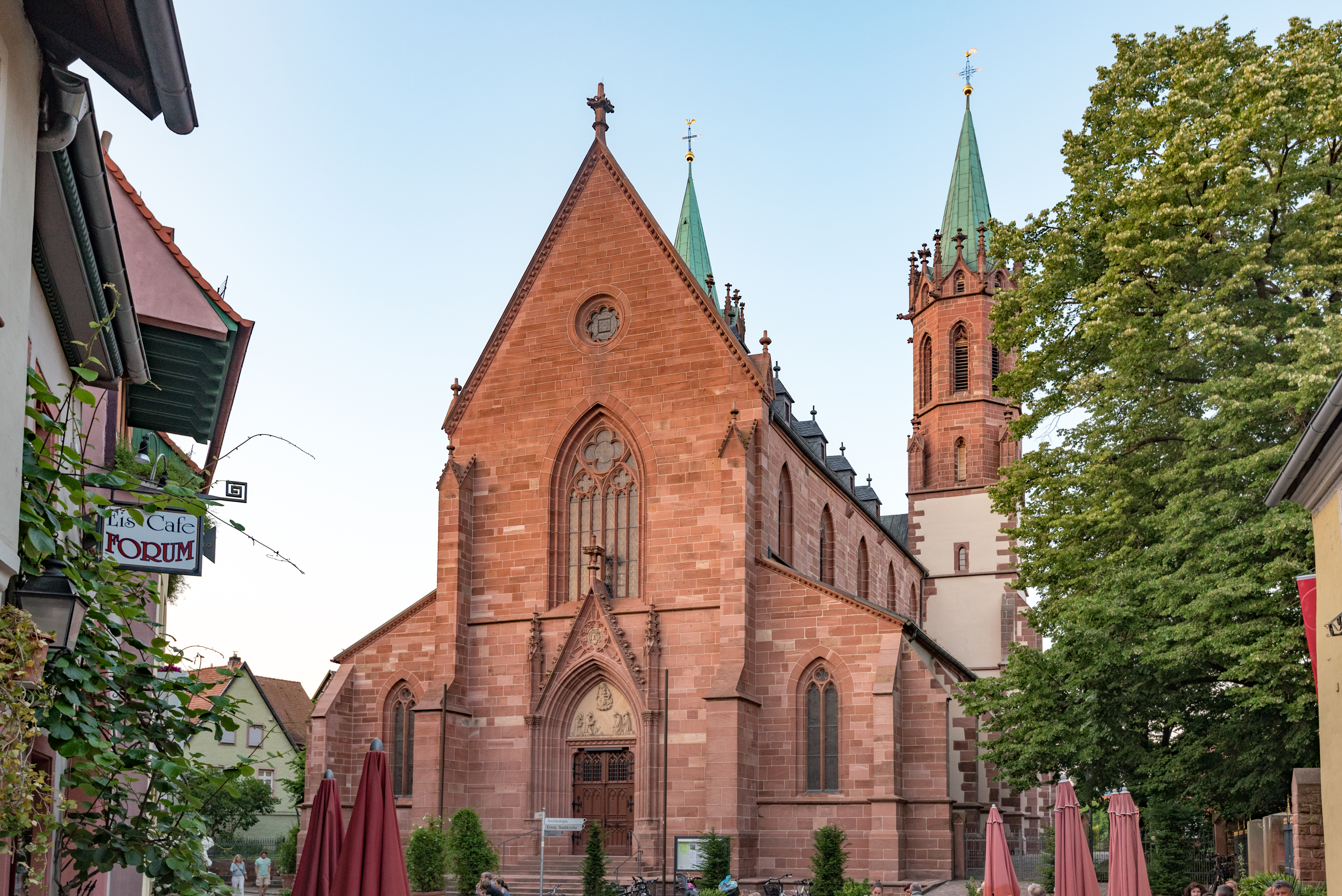
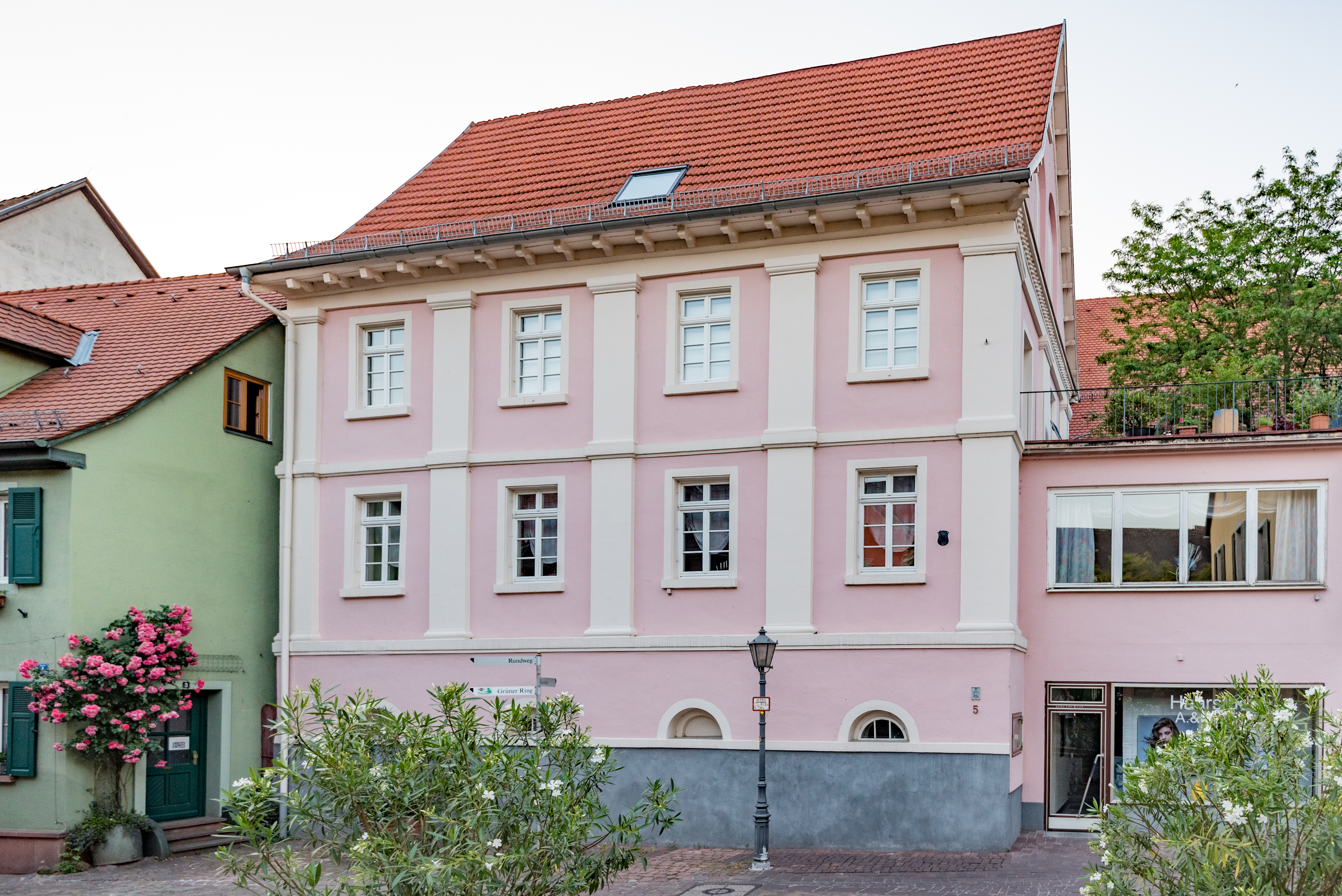
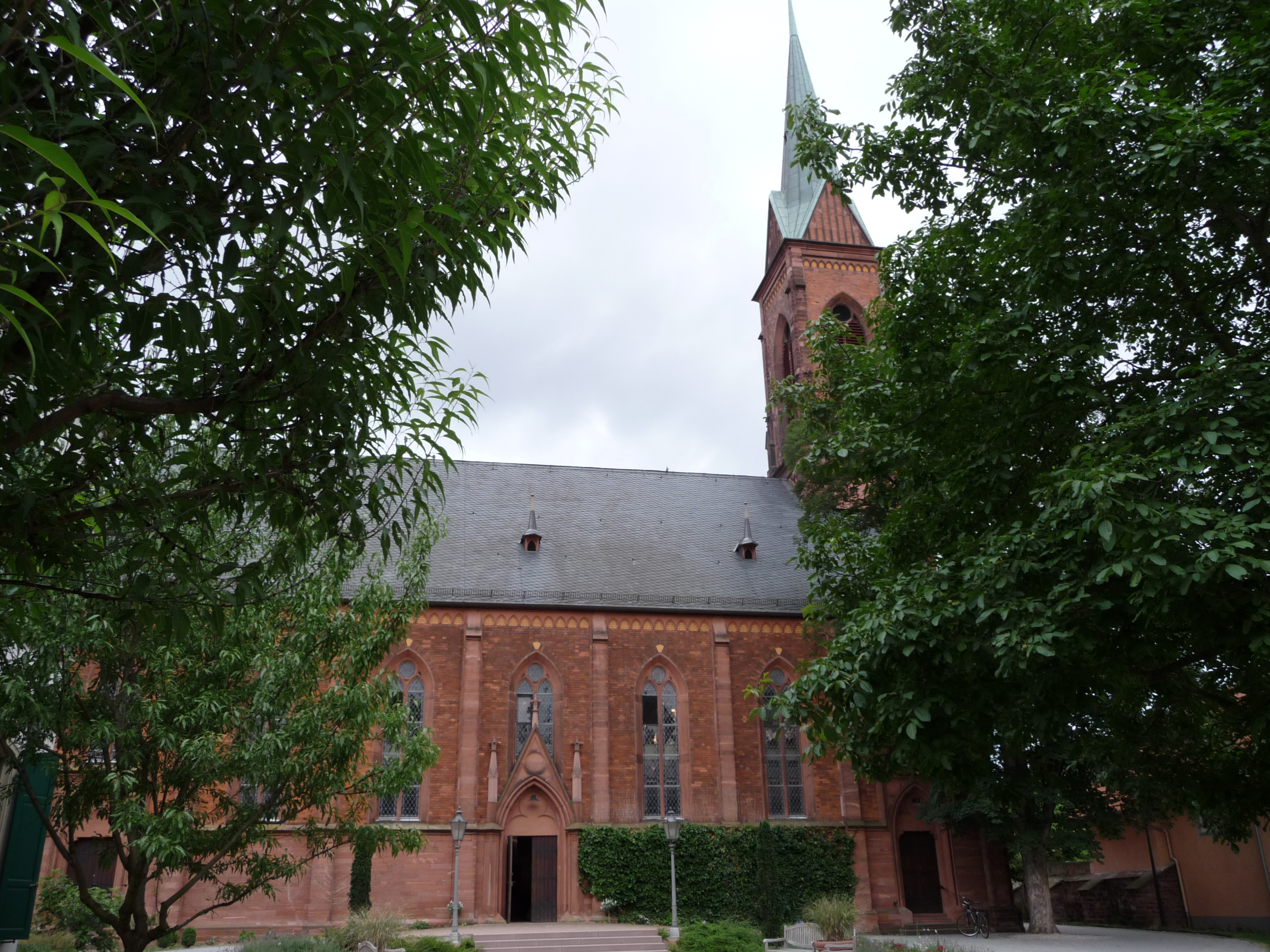
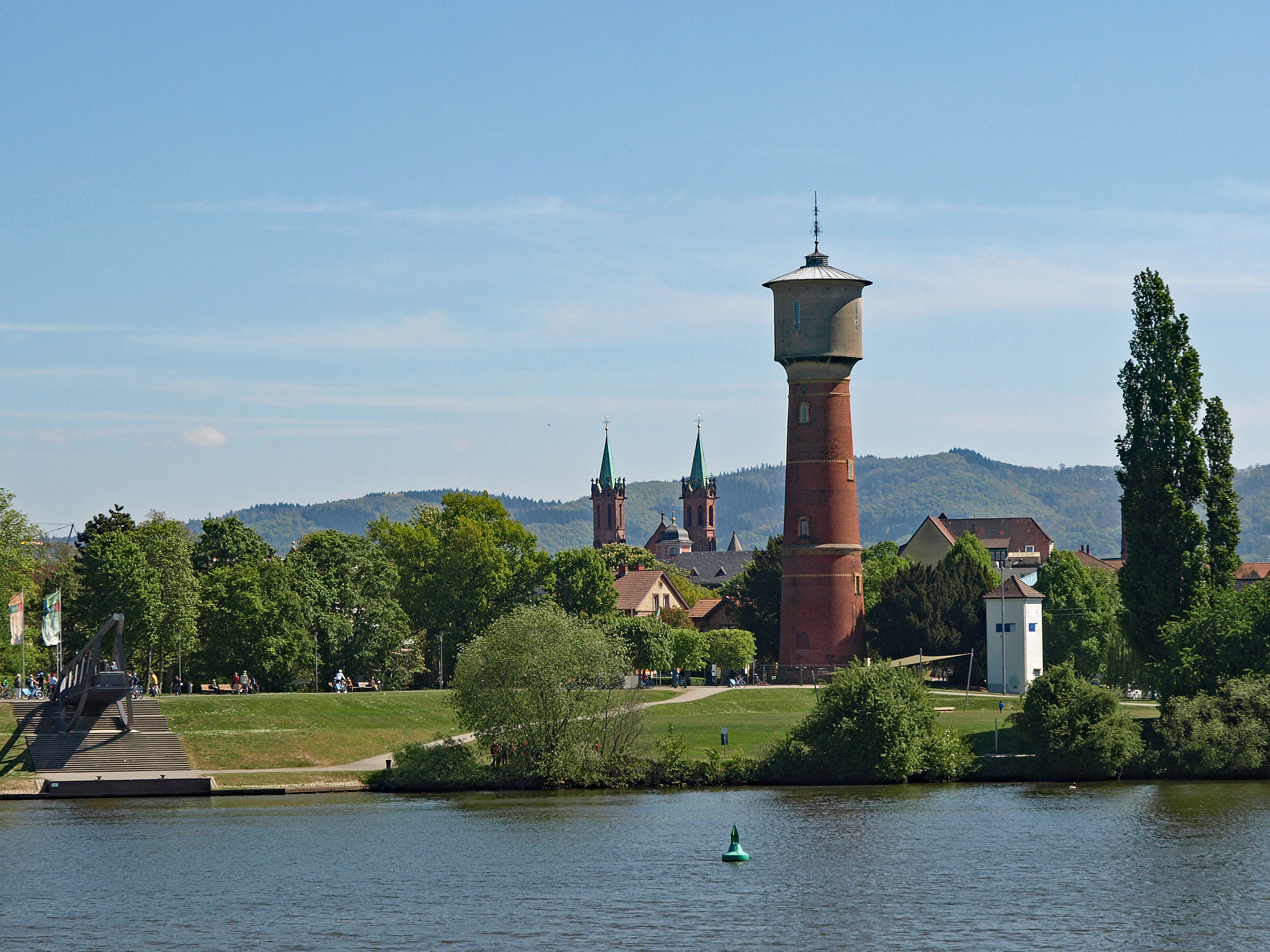
- From the top clockwise: Market square, Hauptstraße, water tower, Protestant church, St Gallus church

- Flag Coat of arms

- Location of Ladenburg in the Rhein-Neckar-Kreis
- Interactive map of Ladenburg
- Location within Germany Location within Baden-Württemberg
- Coordinates: 49°28′N 8°37′E
- Country: Germany
- State: Baden-Württemberg
- Admin. region: Karlsruhe
- District: Rhein-Neckar-Kreis
- Founded: 98 AD

Government
  - Mayor (2017–25): Stefan Schmutz (SPD)

Area
  - Total: 19 km^{2} (7.3 sq mi)
- Elevation: 106 m (348 ft)

Population (2025-12-31)
  - Total: 12,820
  - Density: 670/km^{2} (1,700/sq mi)
- Time zone: UTC+01:00 (CET)
  - Summer (DST): UTC+02:00 (CEST)
- Postal codes: 68526
- Dialling codes: 06203
- Vehicle registration: HD
- Website: www.ladenburg.de

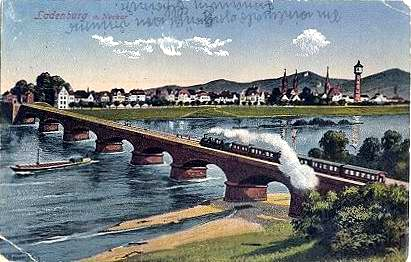
Ladenburg in 1900

Ladenburg (German pronunciation: [ˈlaːdn̩ˌbʊʁk]) is a town in northwestern Baden-Württemberg, Germany. It lies on the right bank of the river Neckar, 10 km (6 mi) northwest of Heidelberg and 10 km (6 mi) east of Mannheim.

The town's history goes back to the Celtic and Roman Ages, when it was called Lopodunum. Emperor Trajan elevated it to city status ('civitas') in 98 AD. The historic old town and its Fachwerkhäuser date back to the Late Middle Ages when Ladenburg was the capital of the Prince-Bishopric of Worms. Famous residents include Carl Benz, inventor of the first automobile. The Bertha Benz Memorial Route, named after Carl's wife Bertha, runs through the town.

== Geography ==
=== Location and natural environment ===
Ladenburg lies on the Neckar alluvial cone at an altitude of 96 to 106 metres in the Rhine-Neckar Metropolitan Region in the Upper Rhine Plain. South of the built-up area the Kandelbach flows into the Neckar. The district extends over 1900 hectares. Of these, 24.7 percent are settlement and transport areas, 71.8 percent are used for agriculture and 2.8 percent are water areas.

The nearest major cities are each about eleven kilometres away, Heidelberg in the southeast and Mannheim in the northwest, with which there is no direct border.

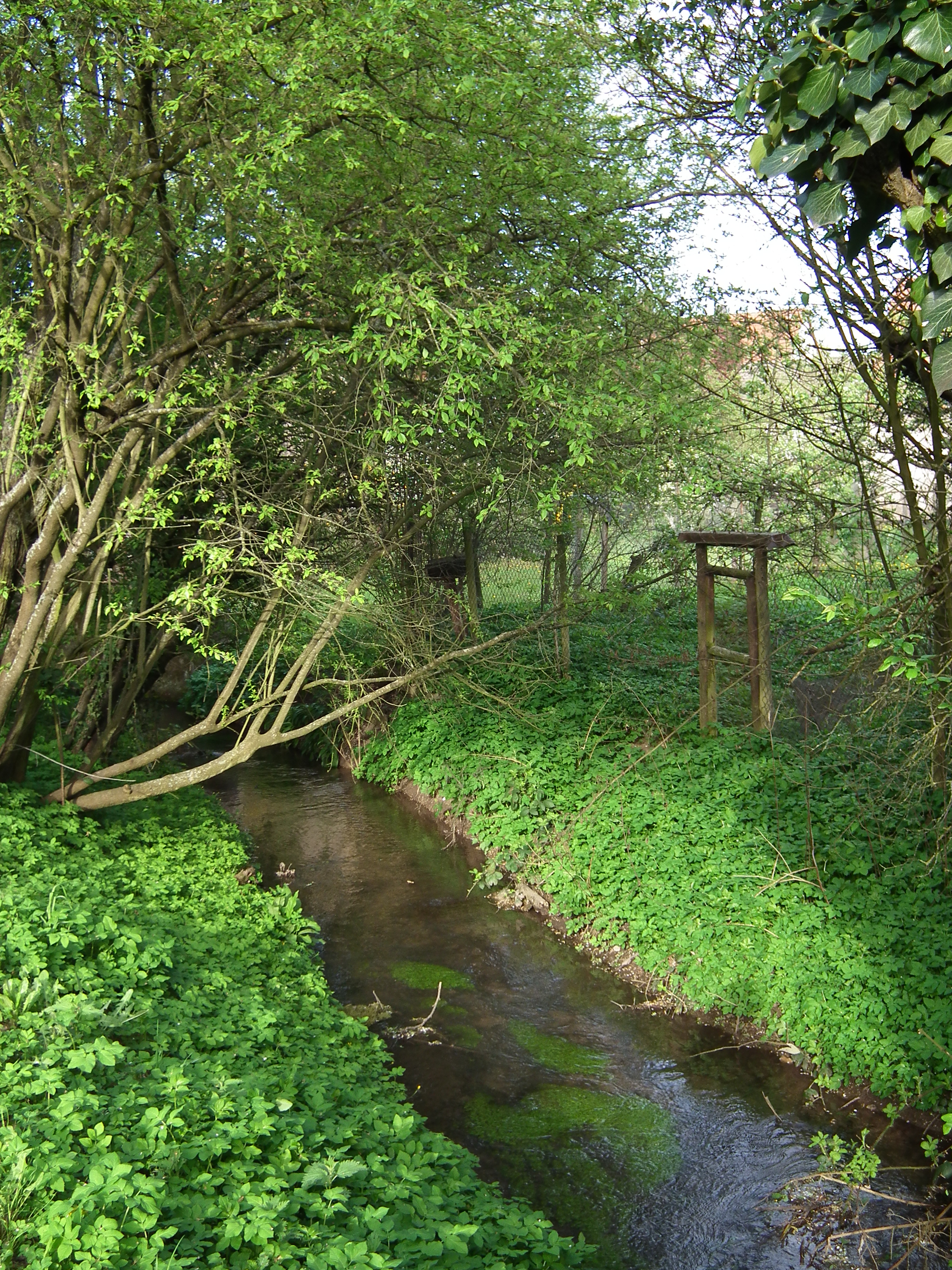
Kandelbach in Ladenburg

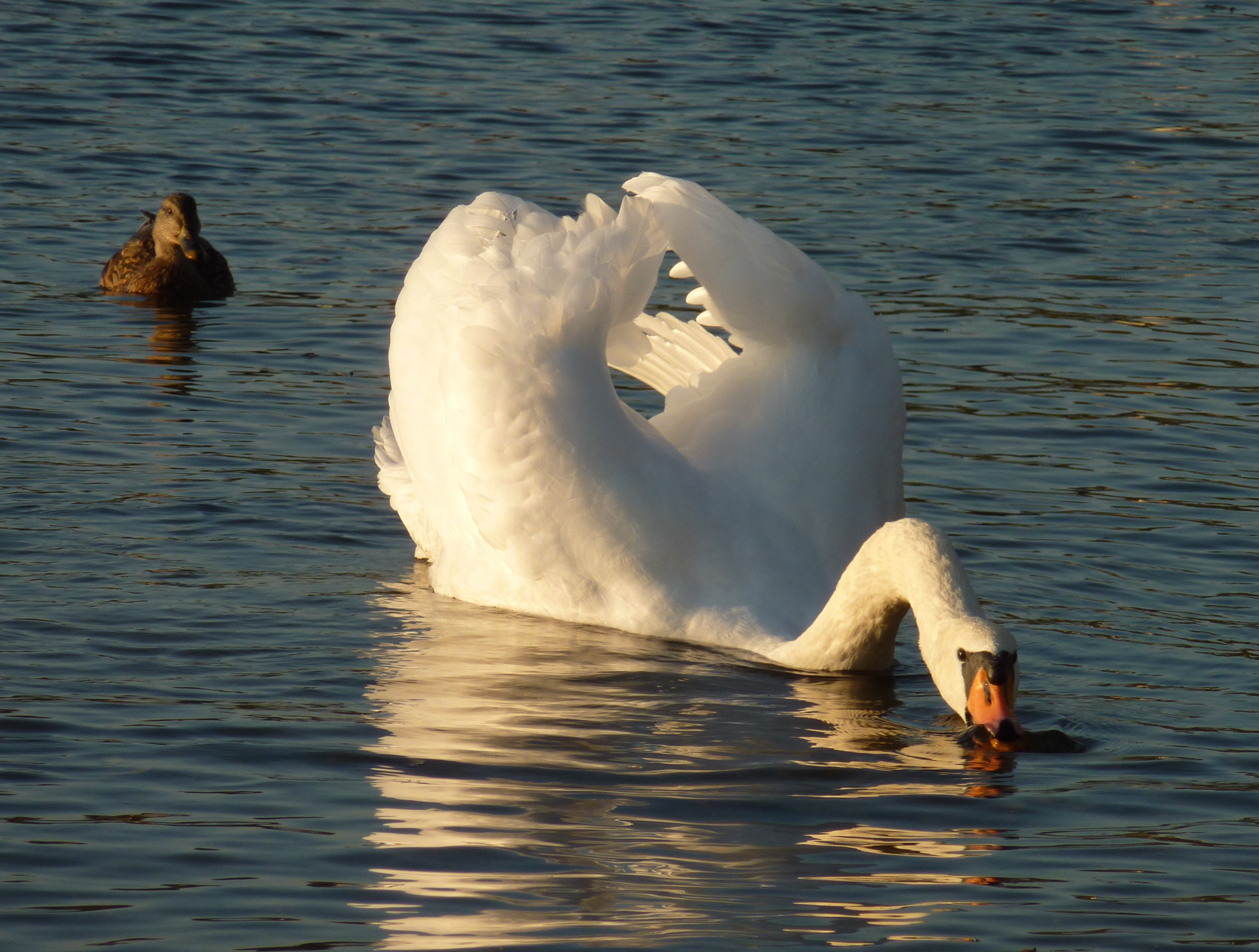
Swan on the Neckar

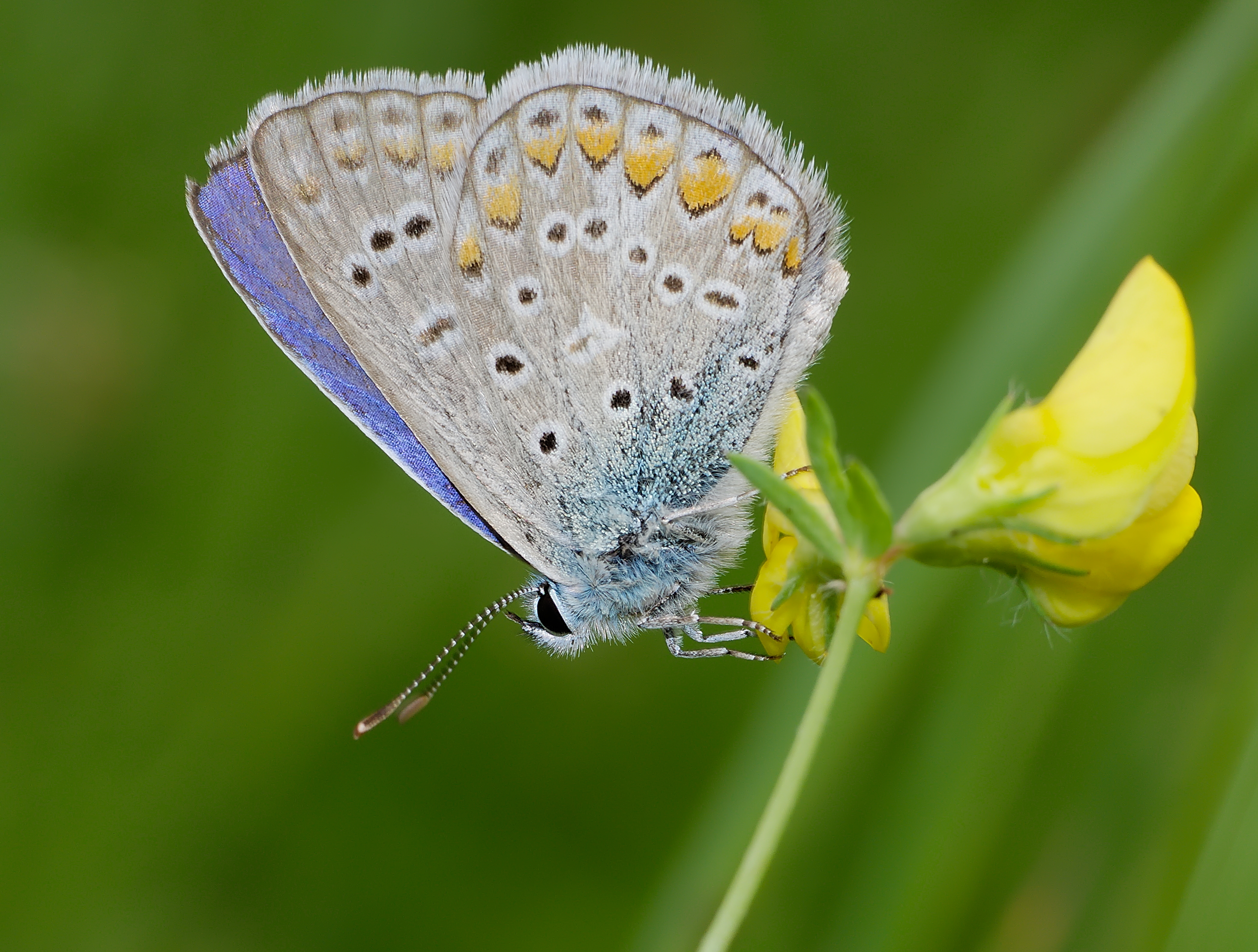
Male Polyommatus icarus

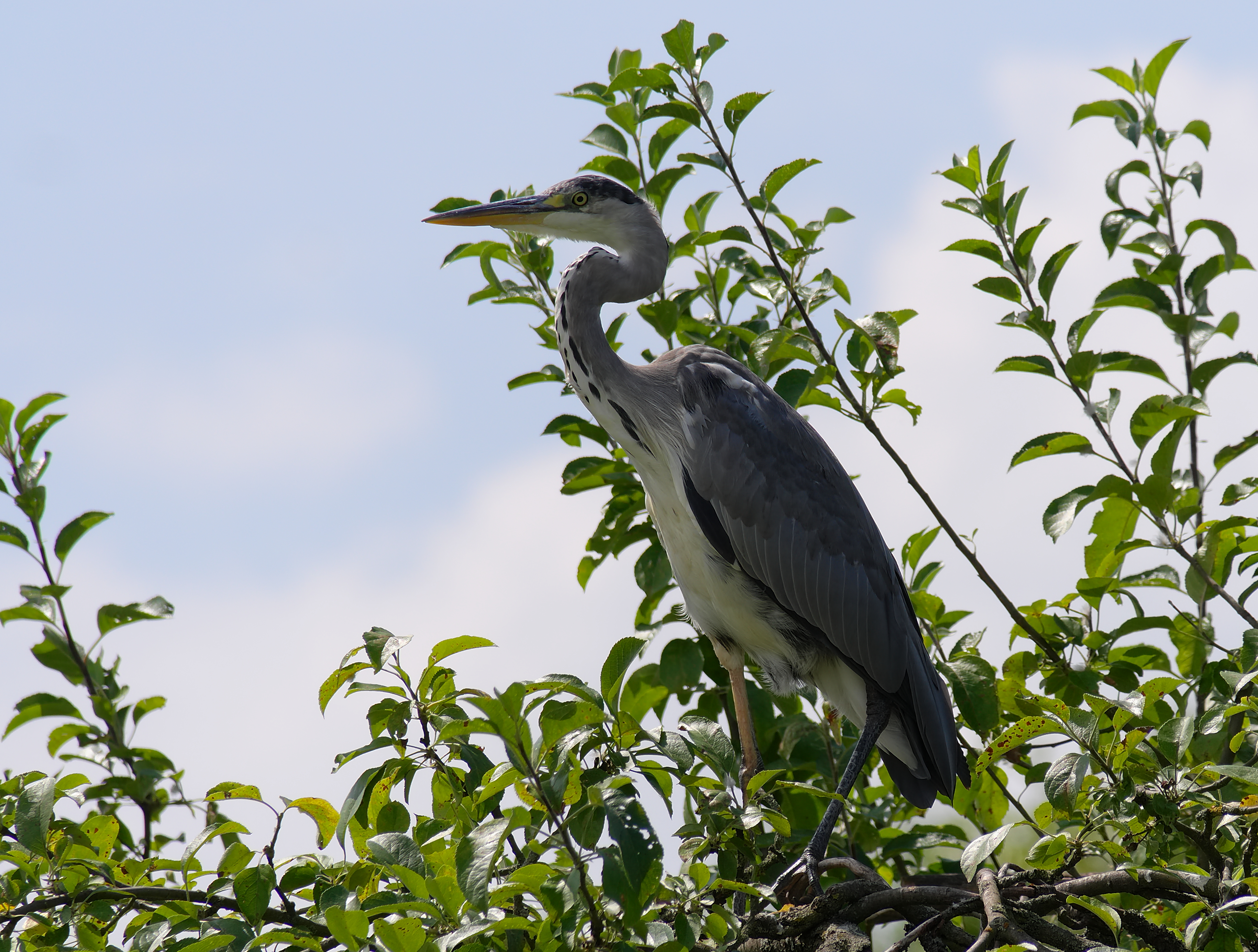
Grey heron

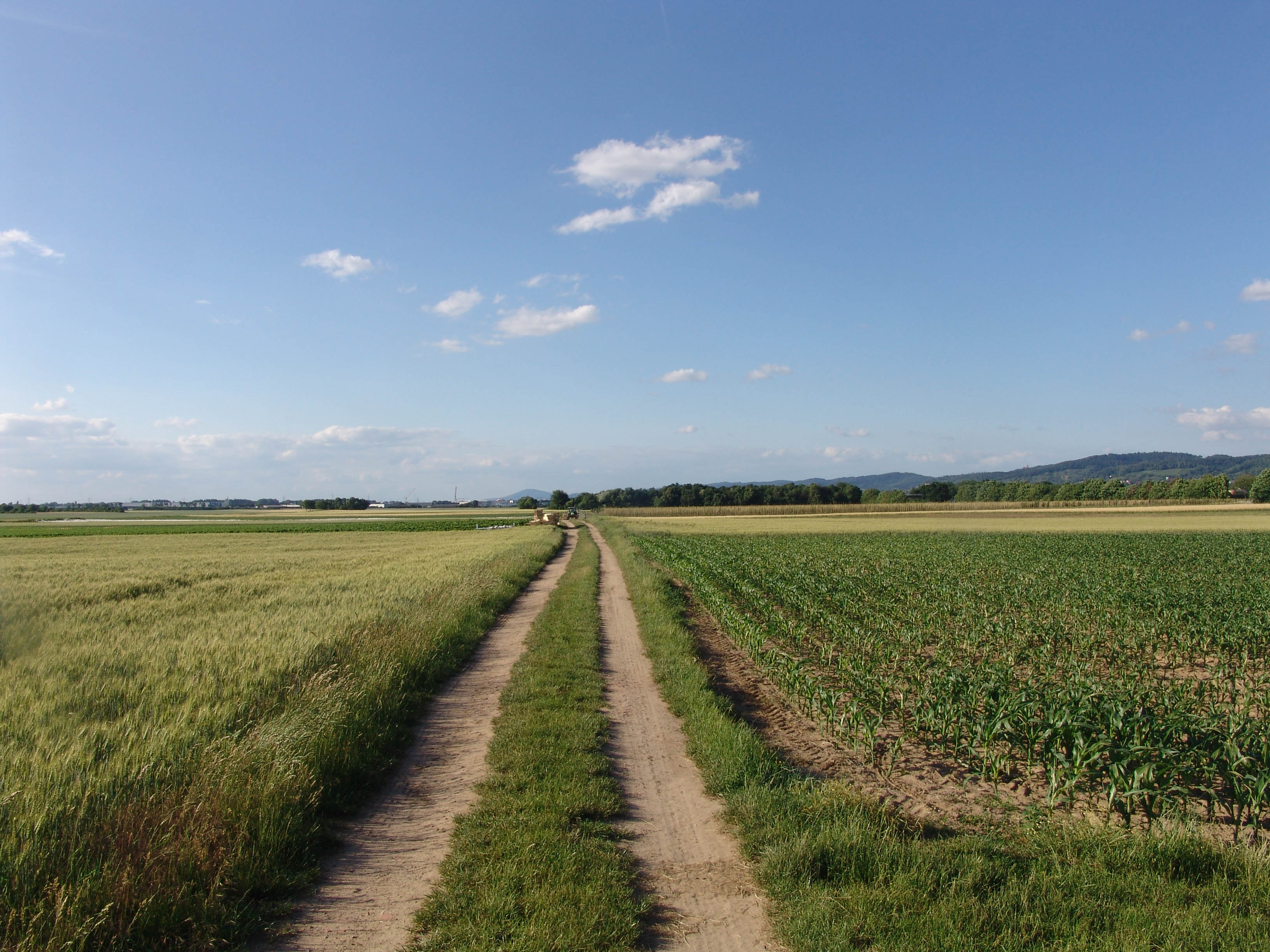
Much of Ladenburg is surrounded by fields.

=== Town division ===
The hamlets of Neubotzheim and Neuzeilsheim and the Rosenhof district belong to the town of Ladenburg. In the town area are the Wüstungen of Botzheim, Meerhof and Zeilsheim.

=== Neighbouring towns ===
Ladenburg's city area borders on Ilvesheim in the west down the Neckar river, Heddesheim in the north, the town of Leutershausen in Hirschberg follows in the northeast towards the Odenwald, south of Leutershausen lies the Bergstrasse town of Schriesheim followed by Dossenheim in the southeast. The course of the river Neckar forms the border to Edingen-Neckarhausen.

=== Climate ===
Ladenburg, like Heidelberg, belongs to the warmest area in Germany. The amount of precipitation on the district increases from west to east and fluctuates between 650 and 800 mm. The nearest climate station in Heidelberg measured an average temperature of 11.1 °C and a precipitation of 745 mm per year between 1971 and 2000. The warmest month is July with an average temperature of 20.1 °C, the coldest month is January with 2.5 °C.

Average monthly temperatures and precipitation for Heidelberg 1971–2000

	Jan	Feb	Mar	Apr	May	Jun	Jul	Aug	Sep	Oct	Nov	Dec
Temperature (°C)	2,5	3,6	7,3	10,5	15,2	17,8	20,1	19,8	15,9	11,1	6,0	3,6	Ø	11,1
Precipitation(mm)	48	44	53	49	77	79	81	56	64	64	68	63	Σ	745

== History ==
=== Antiquity ===
Ladenburg describes itself as the newest town in Germany on the right side of the Rhine. The first settlement of the town took place sometime between 3000 and 200 BC. Ladenburg initially existed as the Celtic settlement Lokudunom, which means sea castle. In 200 BC the Celtic centre of the Gaume was moved from Heiligenberg near Heidelberg to Ladenburg. In the year 40, the Romans settled Suebian Elbe Germans as a peasant militia. In the Roman sources they are called Suebi Nicrenses ("Neckarsueben"). In 74 AD, the Romans founded an auxiliary fort there with a camp village (vicus), the nucleus of the later city. The garrison included an auxilian cavalry division of the Germanic Cananefates, their name means "leek masters".

In 98 Emperor Trajan elevated the settlement of Lopodunum to civitas (city status) and to the capital of the Civitas Ulpia Sueborum Nicrensium; after the emperor's gentile name - Ulpius - the place received the epithet Ulpia. The settlement flourished in the second and early third century, as evidenced by numerous archaeological finds.

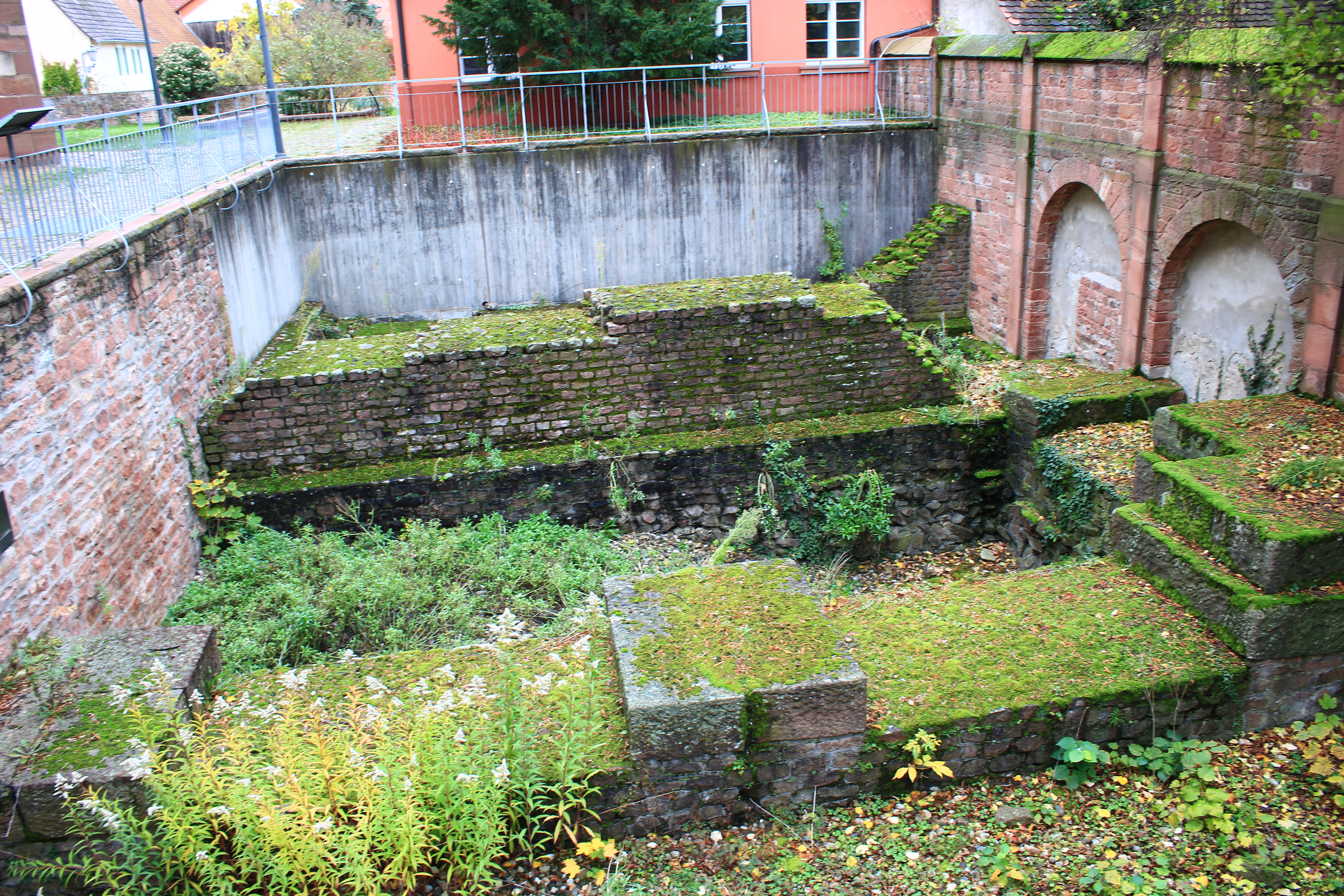
Forum / Basilica Ruins from 2nd Century A.D.

Around the year 220 the Roman town had a forum with a market basilica, a weekly market, temples, a Roman theatre, thermal baths, palaces and a town wall. The public buildings were unusually large compared to other settlements in the region. The walled area was about 32 hectares, scattered finds even occupy a settlement area of about 45 hectares. Thus Ladenburg was the largest Roman town in today's Baden-Württemberg, even before Rottweil, Rottenburg, Bad Cannstatt, Bad Wimpfen, Heidenheim and Heidelberg.

In the year 260 or shortly before, apparently Alamanni destroyed the city after the imperial troops had abandoned the decumate land. However, some locals stayed and handed down the Roman place name. Emperor Valentinian I retook the settlement in 369 and had a country castle, a late antique harbour fortification, built, which could only be entered from the Neckar. Around the middle of the 5th century, probably in 454 after the collapse of the Hun Empire, the Roman rule in the Ladenburg area finally came to an end.

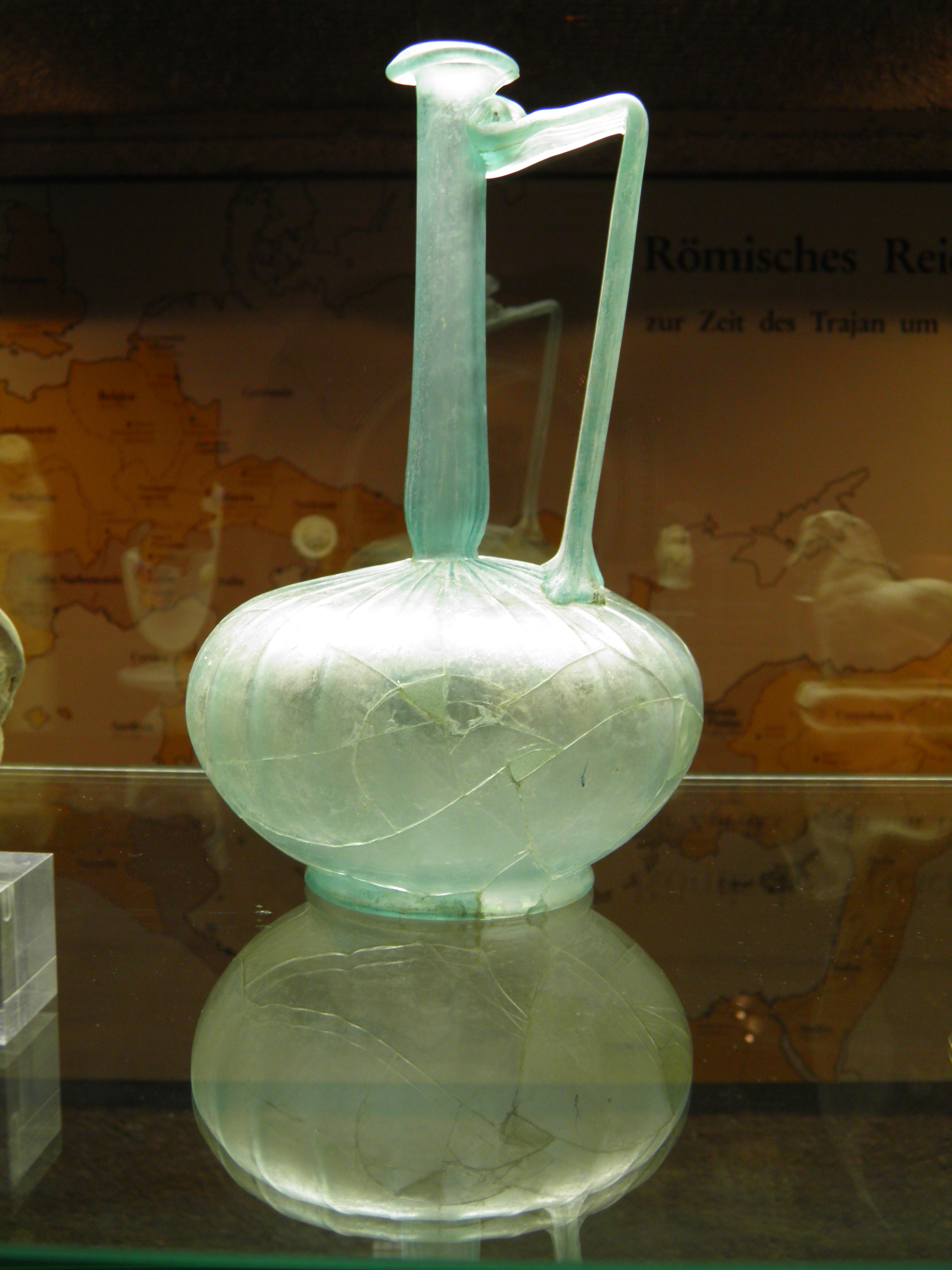
Ancient Roman glass vessel from the Lobdengau-Museum, Ladenburg, formerly Lopodunum

=== Migration Period and Middle Ages ===
As early as 496 the Merovingians built a royal court in Ladenburg which has been handed down as a palace. Lobdenburg became the capital of the Lobdengau. In 628, the Frankish King Dagobert I "gave away" the town and the region to the diocese of Worms. In 874 King Ludwig the German documented Lobetenburg. In Carolingian times, Ladenburg was one of the few towns in the empire that were designated as Civitas Publica, which presupposes the continued existence of the royal court. Already in the 10th century the first medieval city walls were built. In 1006 King Heinrich II, the saint, confirmed to the bishop of Worms all possessions of the cathedral monastery of Ladenburg and five years later he granted the bishop the county of Lobdengau.

In 1253, the community made its first appearance with a Schultheiß, aldermen and citizens. In 1385 the dominion over Ladenburg was divided between Worms and the Palatinate after a bloody feud.

In 1400 the citizens of Worms disobeyed their bishop and expelled him, whereupon Ladenburg became the seat of the bishop. In 1412, Bishop Johann II von Fleckenstein had the south tower of St. Gallus Church built, "because he, as bishop, is entitled to two towers", thus a cathedral. Under Bishop Johann III von Dalberg (1455-1503) Ladenburg had its greatest flourishing. In 1512, on the threshold of modern times, his friend Emperor Maximilian visited the town.

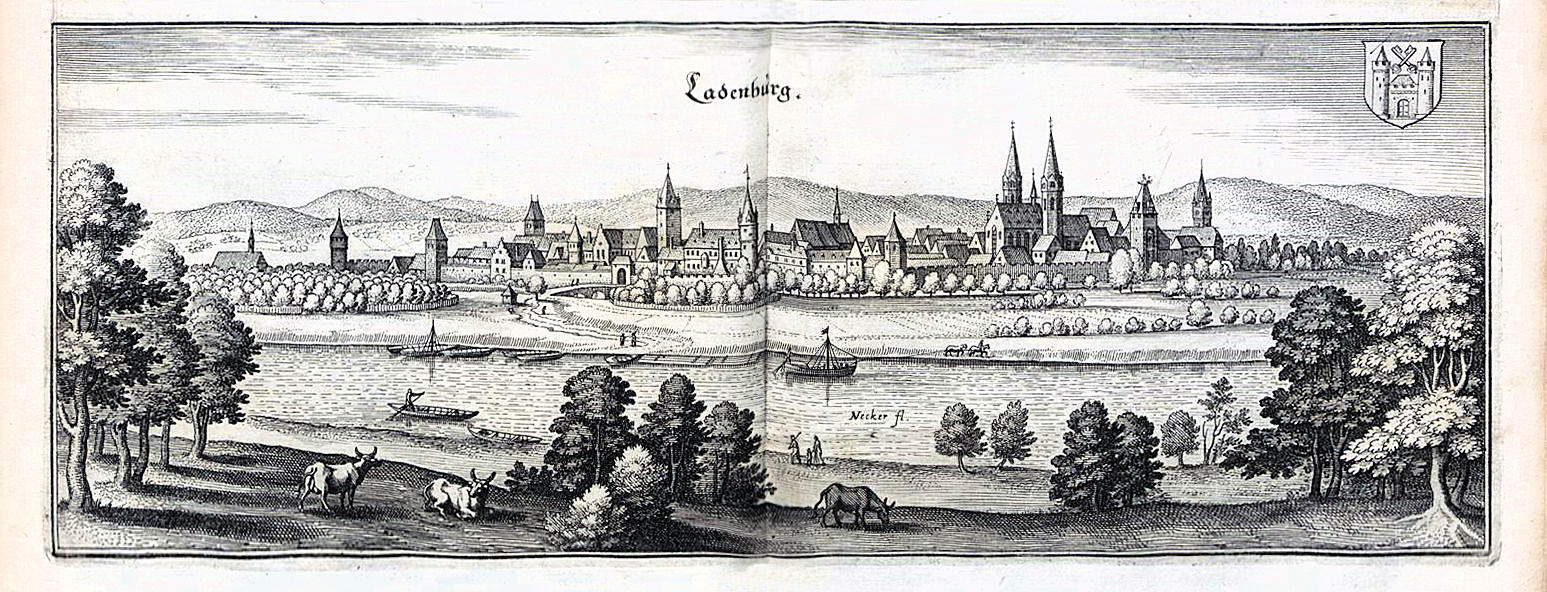
View of Ladenburg in 1645

=== Modern times ===
The later reformer Reuchlin was in charge of the book collection, which was taken over from the Lorsch Abbey and supplemented with Dalberg's holdings and is known today as Bibliotheca Palatina. On Christmas Eve in 1564, a brawl broke out between the Reformed priest Eckard and Bishop Bettendorf in St. Gallus. In the following year Bettendorf reconciled with the Wormsers and left Ladenburg, the secondary residence remaining. Thereupon, Frederick III, the Calvinist Elector of the Palatinate had the church of St. Gallus plundered on Good Friday and Catholic images destroyed (Kurpfälzer Bildersturm).

During the Thirty Years' War, the town was partially destroyed by Peter Ernst II of Mansfeld in 1622 and plundered by General Mélac during the Palatinate War of Succession (1689-1693). In 1705 the brothers Elector Johann Wilhelm and Bishop Franz Ludwig von Pfalz-Neuburg agreed on a larger exchange of territory. Ladenburg, together with Neckarhausen, fell completely to the Electoral Palatinate, who established an Oberamt (senior office) in Ladenburg with the town as its seat.

After the French Revolution Ladenburg was occupied in the coalition wars of 1799 and Napoléon Bonaparte rearranged the political map of Europe. The Kurpfalz was dissolved and the town fell to Baden. It remained an official residence until 1863, when it was incorporated into the Mannheim District Office. When the Baden Revolution was suppressed in 1849, the Neckar Bridge in Ladenburg was fiercely contested. The revolutionaries succeeded in conquering the town occupied by the Prussians, thus covering the return march of the main forces.

Politically, the Social Democrats were the strongest force in Ladenburg since 1903. During the Weimar Republic, they were temporarily eclipsed by the Zentrum due to the fragmentation of the left-wing party spectrum. From 1930 the NSDAP was the strongest party, receiving 34.2 percent of the vote in the Reichstag elections in March 1933.

With the dissolution of the Landkreis Mannheim Ladenburg became part of the new Rhein-Neckar-Kreis in 1973. In 1974, the Altstadtfest (Old Town Festival) was held for the first time and has since developed into a visitor magnet. In 1979, the city was awarded the gold plaque by Federal President Walter Scheel in the federal competition "Stadtgestalt und Denkmalschutz im Städtebau" (urban design and monument protection in urban development). In 1998 the city celebrated its 1900th anniversary. In the same year, it hosted the "Heimattage Baden-Württemberg". In 2005, the Grünprojekt 2005 (Green Project), also known as the small Landesgartenschau, took place in Ladenburg.

=== Historical population ===
Year	1439	1577	1777	1852	1925	1950	1961	1970	1980	1990	2000	2010	2015	2020
Population	1.175	1.330	1.472	2.930	4.993	7.125	8.338	9.799	11.440	11.660	11.582	11.513	11.420	11.661

== Culture and sights ==
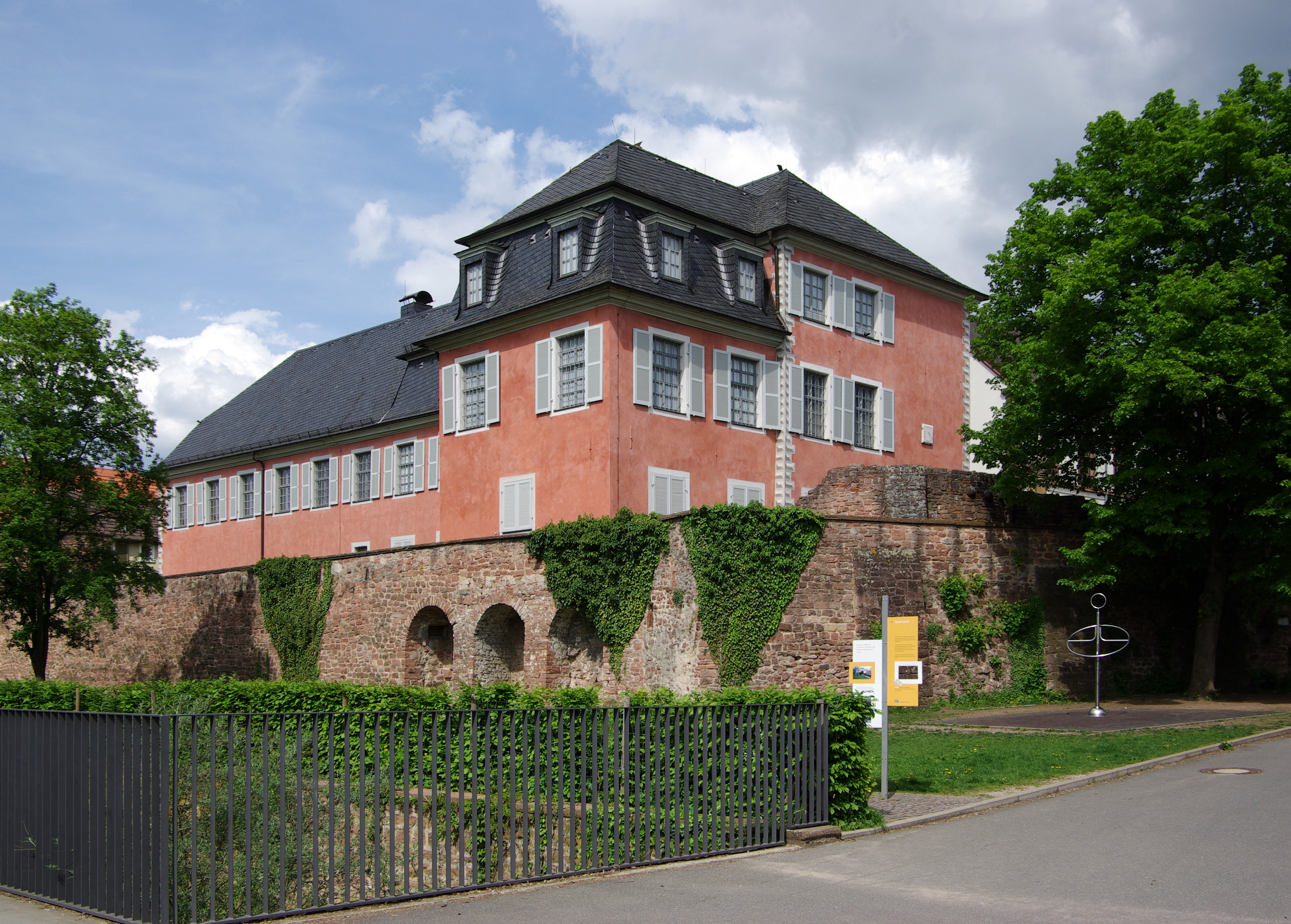
View of the Lobdengau-Museum

=== Museums ===
==== Lobdengau-Museum ====
The Lobdengau-Museum is located in the Bischofshof (with open-air museum) and has the core themes: archaeology, town history and folk culture.

In front of the museum is a copy of a Jupiter giant column, the original of which is in the museum. On the pedestal the four most important Roman deities are represented:

- Minerva (Athena), goddess of wisdom
- Juno, goddess of marriage and family
- Mercurius, god of merchants
- Hercules, hero renown for his strength

The four female heads above represent the four seasons, the youngest one the spring, the woman with the headscarf the winter. At the top, the father of the gods rides a giant down, a sign of the victory of the Romans over the barbarians.

When the Alemanni invaded Ladenburg around the year 220, they toppled this column. But the Roman Novanius Augustus had it renovated and put it up again. When the Alemanni came back 40 years later, they smashed the column and threw it into a well. Thus it was preserved and was discovered when a new house was built.

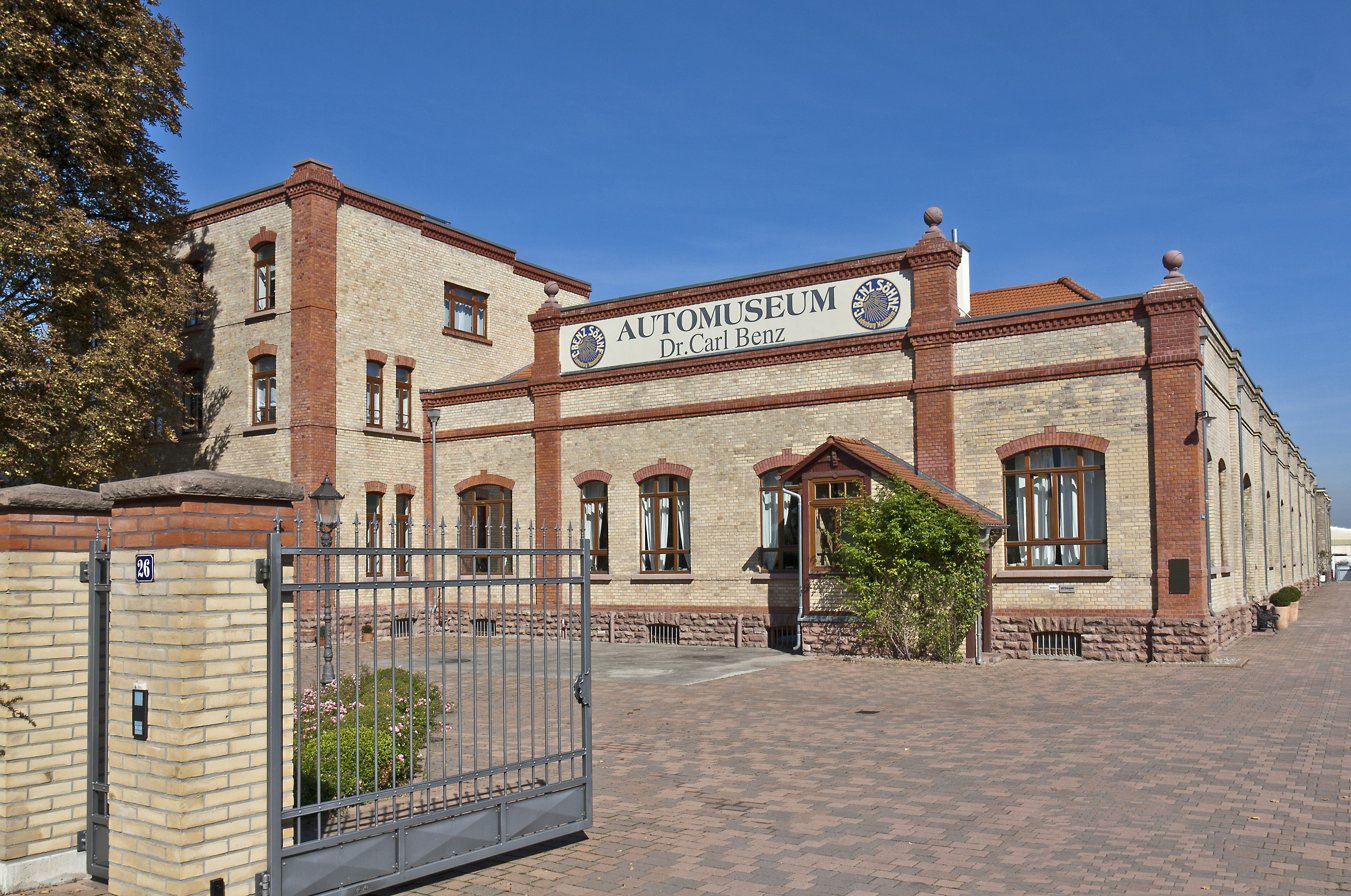
Front entrance of the Automuseum Dr. Carl Benz

==== Automuseum Dr. Carl Benz ====
The Automobile Museum Dr. Carl Benz in Ladenburg moved in 2005. The current home of the collection is the almost 100-year-old factory buildings of C. Benz Söhne. The historic factory, where automobiles were built at the beginning of the 20th century, was renovated with the support of DaimlerChrysler AG and provides a great setting for the motor history exhibits (including over 80 vehicles and other objects) of the collector Winfried A. Seidel. The car of football legend Fritz Walter, a 280 CE W 114 Coupé from 1973, is currently on display.

== Politics ==
=== Mayors ===
List of mayors:

- 1914–1922: Wilhelm Fritsch
- 1922–1931: Christian Koch (SPD)
- 1931–1933: Hermann Hagen
- 1933–1934: Alfred Reuther (NSDAP)
- 1934–1945: Kurt Pohly (NSDAP)
- 1945–1953: Adam Herdt (CDU)
- 1953–1965: Hermann Hohn (FWV)
- 1965–1993: Reinhold Schulz (SPD)
- 1993–2001: Rolf Reble (CDU)
- 2001–2017: Rainer Ziegler (SPD)
- since 2017: Stefan Schmutz (SPD)

=== Municipal council ===
The Municipal Council of Ladenburg has 22 members, who are elected in direct elections for five years each. In addition, the mayor is the chairman of the municipal council. The municipal elections in 2019 led to the following result (in brackets: difference to 2014):

CDU	27,0 % (−4,5)	6 Sitze (−1)
GLL	26,2 % (+10,3)	6 Sitze (+2)
SPD	23,8 % (−3,5)	5 Sitze (−1)
FWV	16,3 % (−2,6)	4 Sitze (±0)
FDP	6,8 % (+0,3)	1 Sitz (±0)

=== Coat of arms ===
The blazon of the coat of arms reads: In shield diagonally divided by silver and blue, a red castle with open gate and raised silver portcullis in the tin-plated and roofed low central part, between the two pointed outer pewter towers two diagonally crossed blue keys (beards turned up). It goes back to a seal of 1253. The colors silver and blue, which were only established in the 19th century, stand for the Kurpfalz. The crossed keys come from the coat of arms of the diocese of Worms. The castle is probably to be regarded as a city gate and thus refers to the city rights. The flag is blue and white.

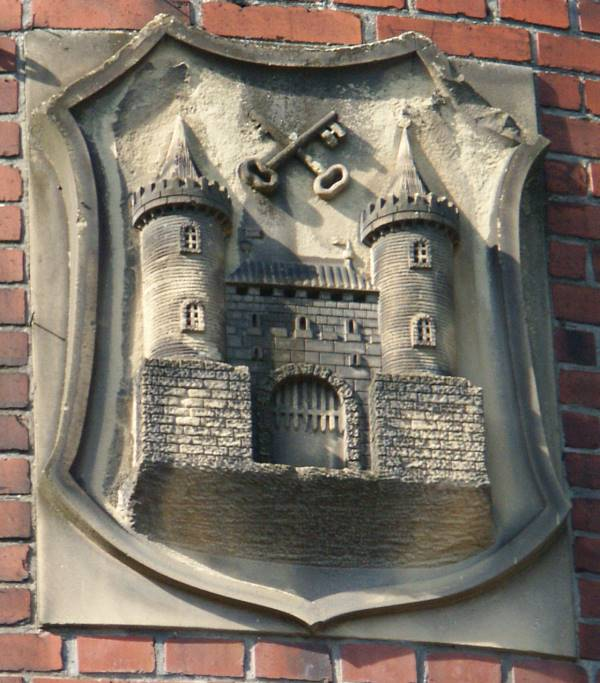
City coat of arms with wrongly turned keybeards on the water tower of Ladenburg

The flag of Ladenburg

== Economy ==
The Rhein-Neckar-Kreis, the district which Ladenburg is located in, ranked 30th out of 401 German districts on the Zukunftsatlas 2019, which indicates "Very high chances". Ladenburg itself has a high purchasing power, ranking highest in the Rhein-Neckar-Kreis.

== Notable personalities ==
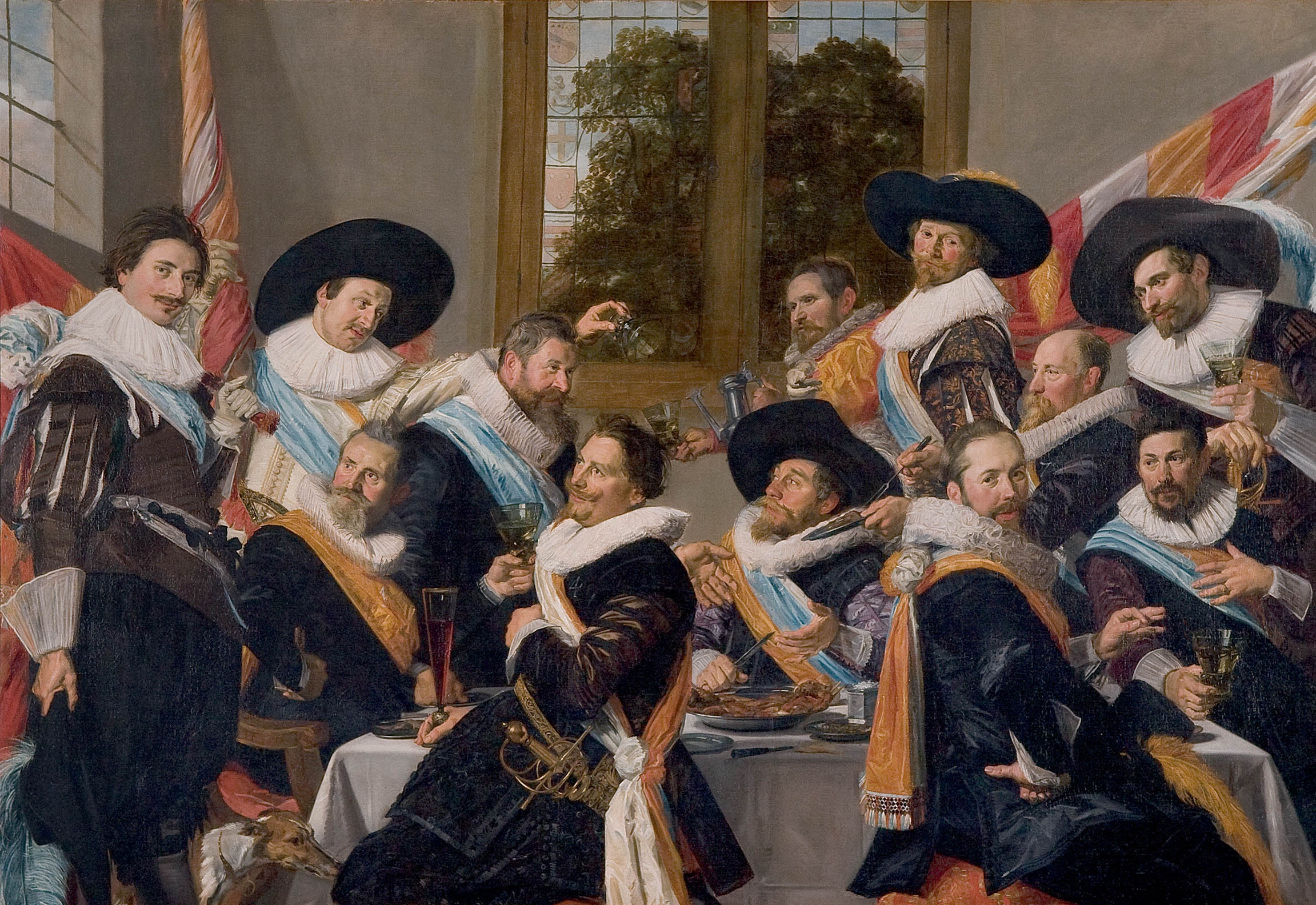
Johan Damius (fourth from left) in Banquet of the officers of the Calivermen Civic Guard, Haarlem by Frans Hals

- Johan Damius (1570–1648), born in Ladenburg, member of the Haarlem schutterij, pictured (right) in Banquet of the officers of the Calivermen Civic Guard, Haarlem
- Johann Friedrich von Seilern, (DE Wiki) (1646–1715), son of a dyer and later Imperial Count, was born in Ladenburg
- Christoph Sauer (1695–1757), the first German-language printer and publisher in North America, was born in Ladenburg.
- The brothers Franz Xaver von Hertling (1780–1844), and Friedrich von Hertling (1781–1850), both Bavarian war ministers, were born in Ladenburg
- Michael Frey (1787–1832), composer, violinist and conductor
- Friedrich August Lehlbach, (DE Wiki) (1805–1875), pastor, member of the Baden Landtag, and father of the American politician Herman Lehlbach
- Lambert Heinrich von Babo (1818–1899), chemist
- Heinrich Siegel, (DE Wiki) (1830–1899), legal historian and professor at the University of Vienna
- Carl Benz (1844–1929), inventor of the automobile, husband of Bertha, lived in Ladenburg from 1906 until his death
- Bertha Benz, (1849–1944), first person to drive an automobile over a long distance, wife of Karl, lived in Ladenburg
- Hermann Hohn (1897–1968), German general, served in both World Wars, recipient of the Knight's Cross with Oak Leaves and Swords, was mayor of Ladenburg for 12 years
- Karl Langenbacher, (DE Wiki) (1908–1965), graphic designer, author of books and Hörspiele (radio drama), was born in Ladenburg
- Karl Wolf (1912–1975), hammer thrower and participator in the 1952 Summer Olympics
- Karin Radermacher, (DE Wiki) (born 1945), politician for the SPD party, former member of the Landtag of Bavaria
- Gerhard Kleinböck, (DE Wiki) (born 1952), politician for the SPD party, former member of the Landtag of Baden-Württemberg

== International relations ==
=== Twin towns ===
Ladenburg is twinned with:

- Garango, Burkina Faso, since 1983
- Paternion, Austria, since 1984
