= Willem Warmont =

Dutch Golden Age Mayor of Haarlem

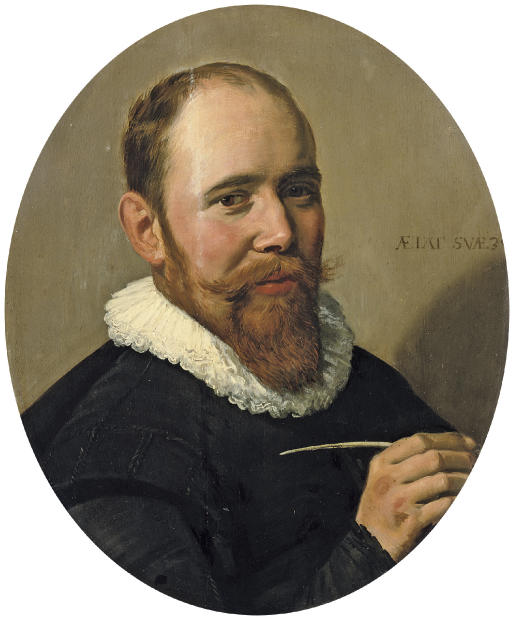
Willem Warmont, after a painting by Frans Hals in 1627

Willem Warmont, or Warmondt (1583 – 8 May 1649), was a Dutch Golden Age brewer and mayor of Haarlem.

== Biography ==
He was born in Amsterdam as the son of the Amsterdam merchant Jacob Warmont and Ytgen Arentsdr Bouwer but moved to Haarlem where he became a brewer in Het Gecroonde Ancker. He was a judge, magistrate and mayor of Haarlem. He was a lieutenant of the St. Adrian militia from 1618 to 1621, captain there from 1624 to 1627 and 1636–1639, and colonel from 1642 to 1645. He married in Amsterdam 11 November 1607 to Catharina van Rhijn, daughter of Jacob Egbertsz and Maria Claesdr. Gaeff.

Willem Warmont was portrayed by Frans Hals twice; once in his schutterstuk called The Banquet of the Officers of the St Adrian Militia Company in 1627, and again in an oval portrait around 1630.

He died in Haarlem.
