= Shrovetide Revellers =

Painting by Frans Hals

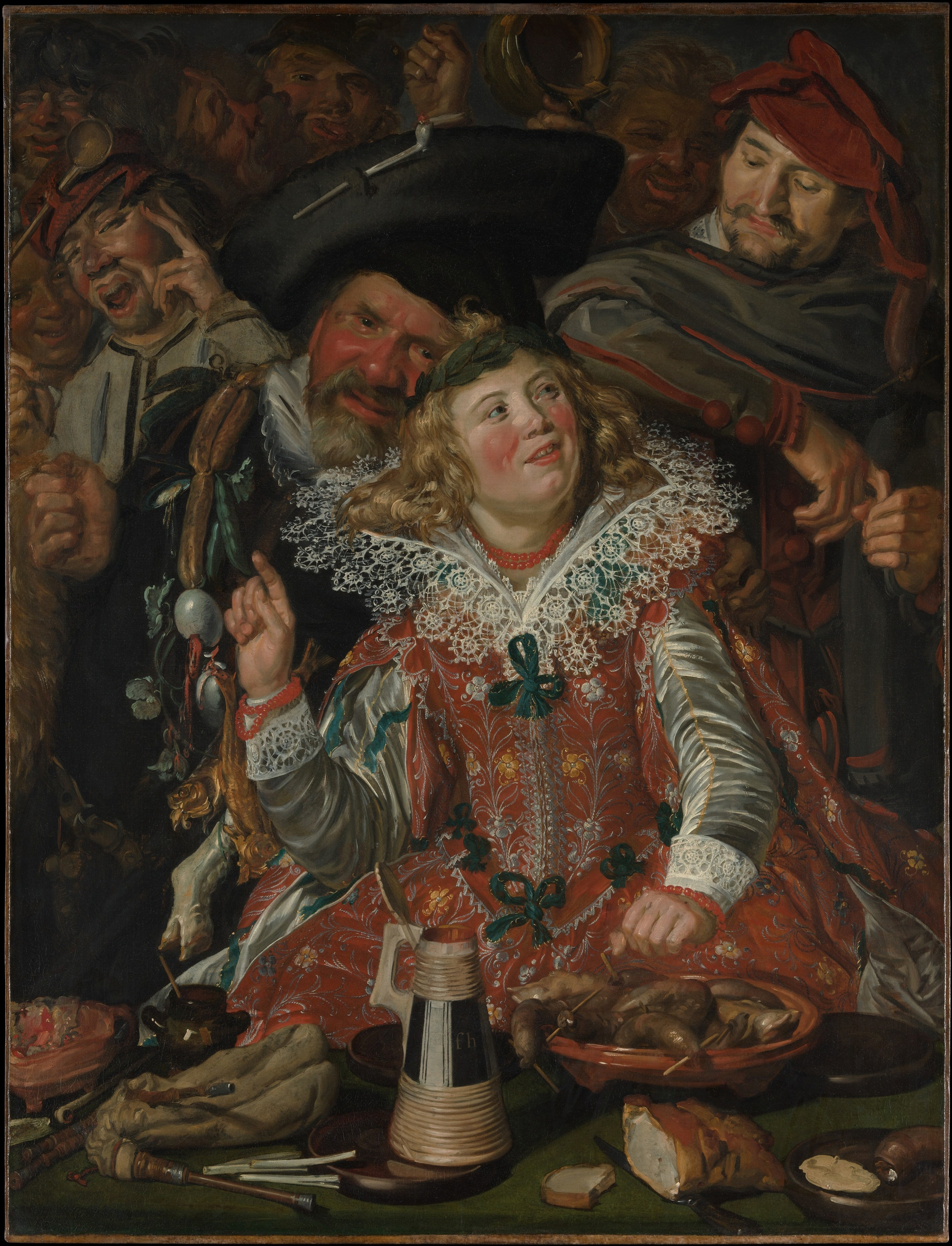
- Shrovetide Revellers
- Artist: Frans Hals
- Year: ca. 1616–17
- Catalogue: Seymour Slive, Catalog 1974: #5
- Medium: Oil on canvas
- Dimensions: 131.4 cm × 99.7 cm (51.7 in × 39.3 in)
- Location: Metropolitan Museum of Art, Bequest of Benjamin Altman, 1913; New York City
- Accession: 14.40.605
- Website: MET online

Shrovetide Revellers, also known as Merrymakers at Shrovetide, is a painting by the Dutch Golden Age painter Frans Hals, painted in around 1616–17. It is one of the earliest surviving works by Hals, and has been held by the Metropolitan Museum of Art, New York City since 1913. The painting shows people festivities at Shrovetide (Dutch: Carnaval), an annual carnival of food and jollity which takes place before the Christian fasting season of Lent.

== Painting ==
The painting shows the face of an elegantly dressed smiling woman raising her right finger to make a point, while a man grabs her shoulder to whisper in her ear: he has a string of herring, eggs and mussels around his neck, with a pig's trotter and a fox tail, symbols of gluttony and foolishness respectively. Another amused gentleman, with a wurst hanging from his cap, leans on the first man's shoulder and listens to their banter. Some claim these are the Baroque theatre characters Peeckelhaeringh and Hans Wurst. Behind them other people are talking and laughing. The flagon Bears the initials "fh".

The female wears much more brightly colored clothing than any of Hals other sitters, and shows a strong resemblance to the young woman portrayed in Hals' Yonker Ramp and His Sweetheart. Both are considered to be genre works today, so the models could be anyone in Hals circle such as his children or pupils. In his 1989 catalog of the international Frans Hals exhibition, Slive included a full color photo of this work to demonstrate Hals' "love of life". The painting itself could not be included in the exhibition because it can never be lent out. In the same year that Slive was writing his exhibition catalog, Claus Grimm rejected the attribution of this painting to Frans Hals, though he conceded it was probably after a painting by Hals, calling it a copy of a lost original.

Hals' positioning of the figures are related to two other known paintings:

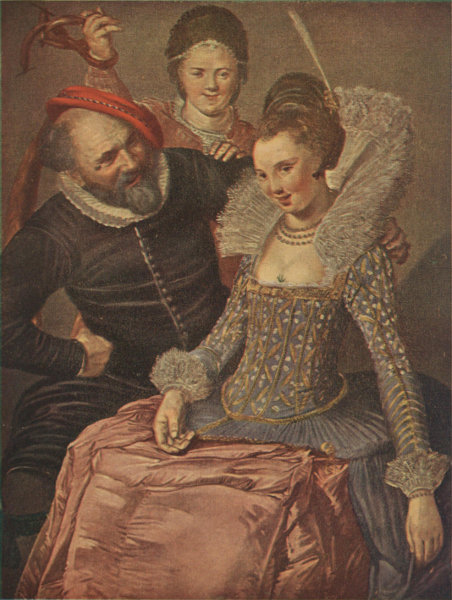
Hals' Merry Trio (lost in World War II)

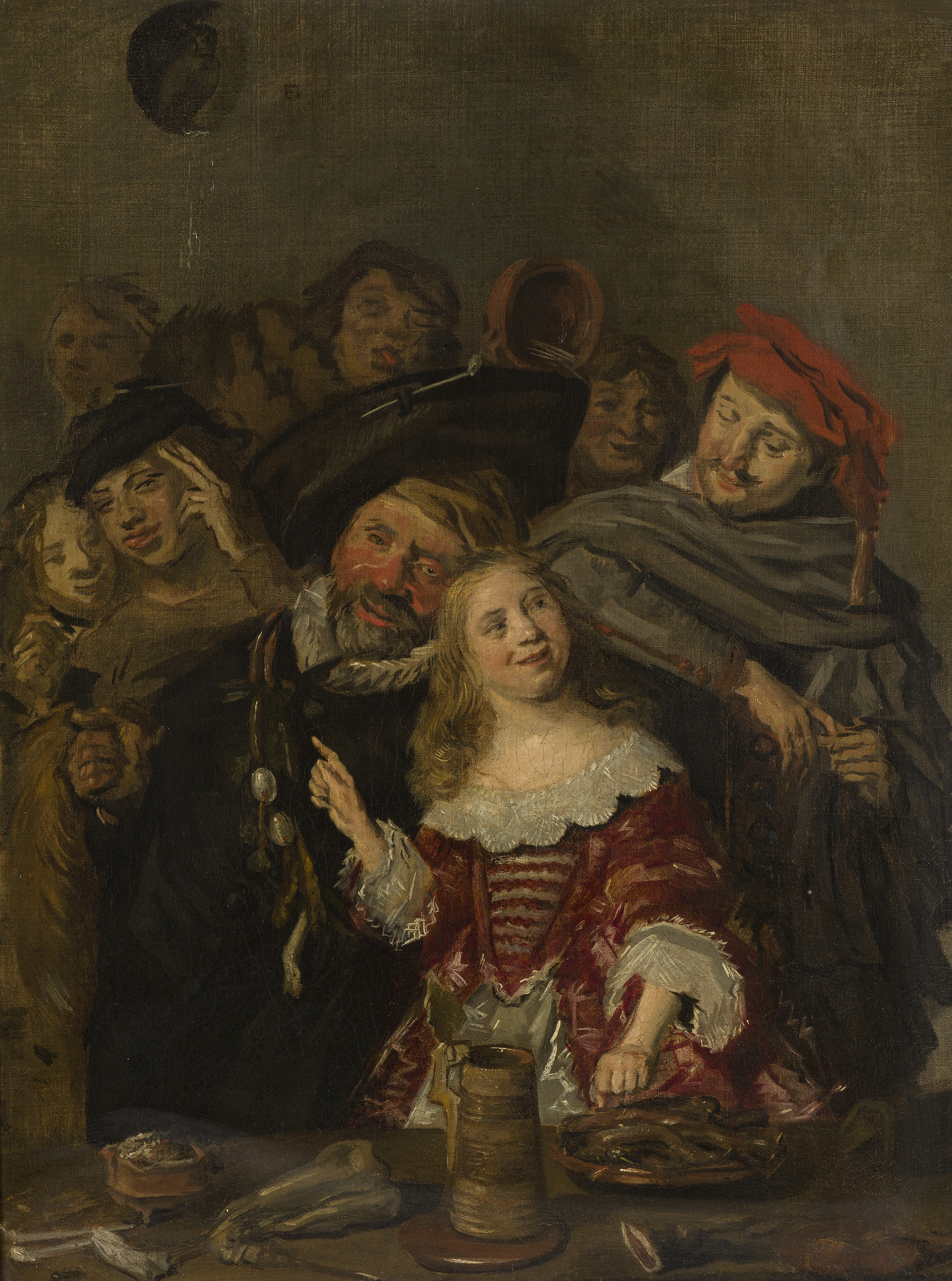
A period copy, situated outside under the moon

== Provenance ==
The painting was first documented by Wilhelm von Bode in 1883, and after that was included in most catalogs of Hals' works, including by Ernst Wilhelm Moes in 1909, Hofstede de Groot in 1910, by W.R. Valentiner in 1923, and by Gerrit David Gratama in 1946. The Metropolitan Museum of Art lists an Amsterdam sale entry from 1765 mentioning a genre work of Vasten-Avond, or Shrove Tuesday, and Seymour Slive mentions a period drawing by Mathys van den Bergh.

The painting was bequeathed to the Metropolitan Museum of Art, New York City on the death of Benjamin Altman in 1913. Altman paid $89,102 to acquire it from a Monsieur Cocret in 1907. Cleaning in 1951 uncovered six heads in the background that had been painted out.

== See also ==
- List of paintings by Frans Hals
