= Pieter Ramp =

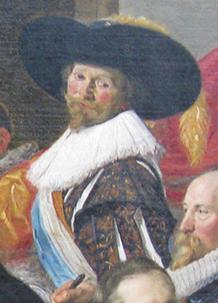
Pieter Ramp, detail of schutterstuk by Frans Hals in 1627

Pieter Ramp (1592 – 1660), was a Dutch Golden Age member of the Haarlem schutterij.

== Biography ==
He was born in Haarlem or Alkmaar as the son of Frederik, heer van Rolland and mayor of Alkmaar, and Wilhelmina van Outshoorn van Sonnevelt. Pieter became a flag bearer of the St Adrian militia in 1611–1630. He was portrayed by Frans Hals in his schutterstuk called The Banquet of the Officers of the St Adrian Militia Company in 1627. For a long time he was considered the young cavalier in Hals' Yonker Ramp and his sweetheart. He is wearing the same jacket as Hals' Laughing Cavalier.

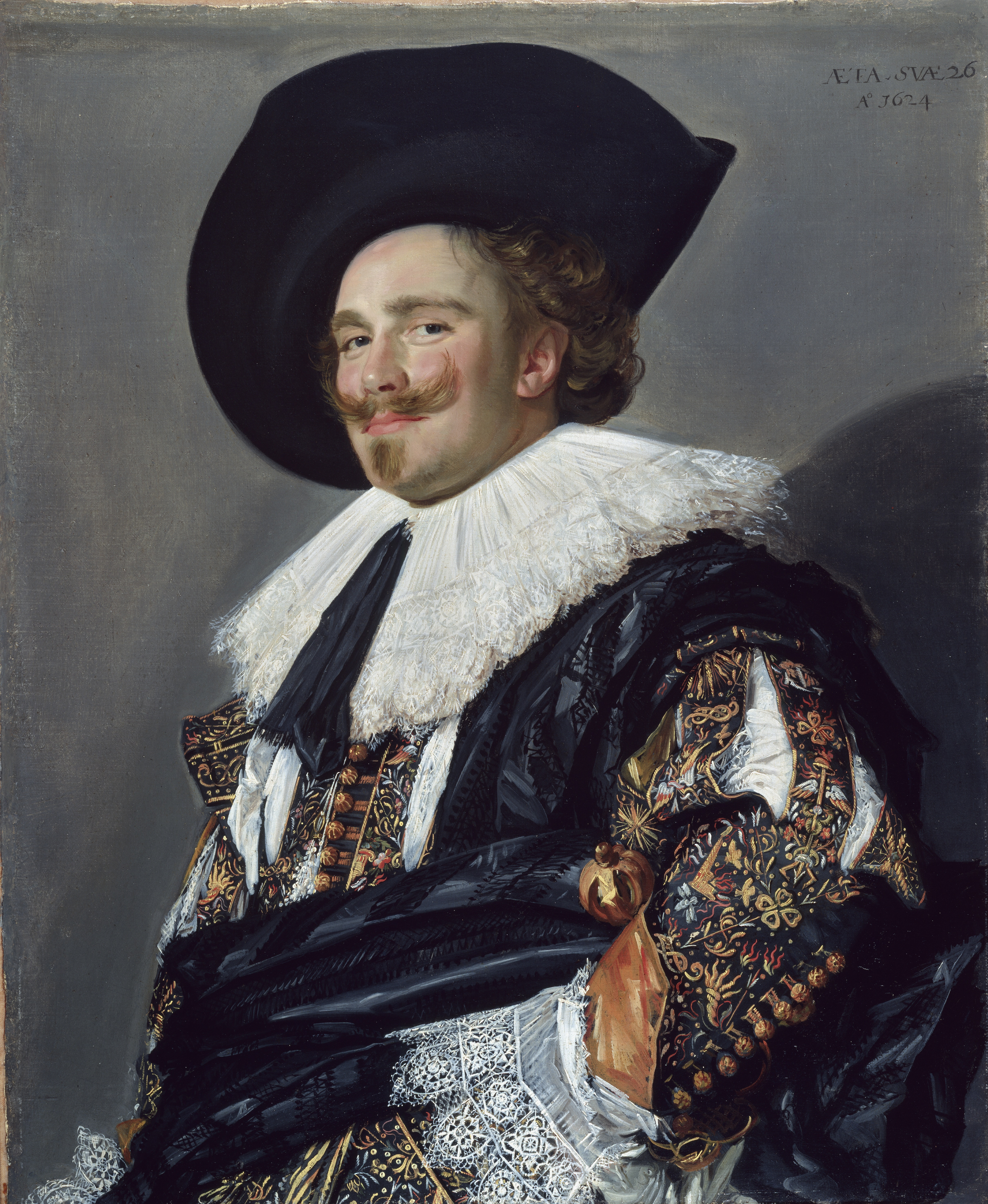
Laughing Cavalier

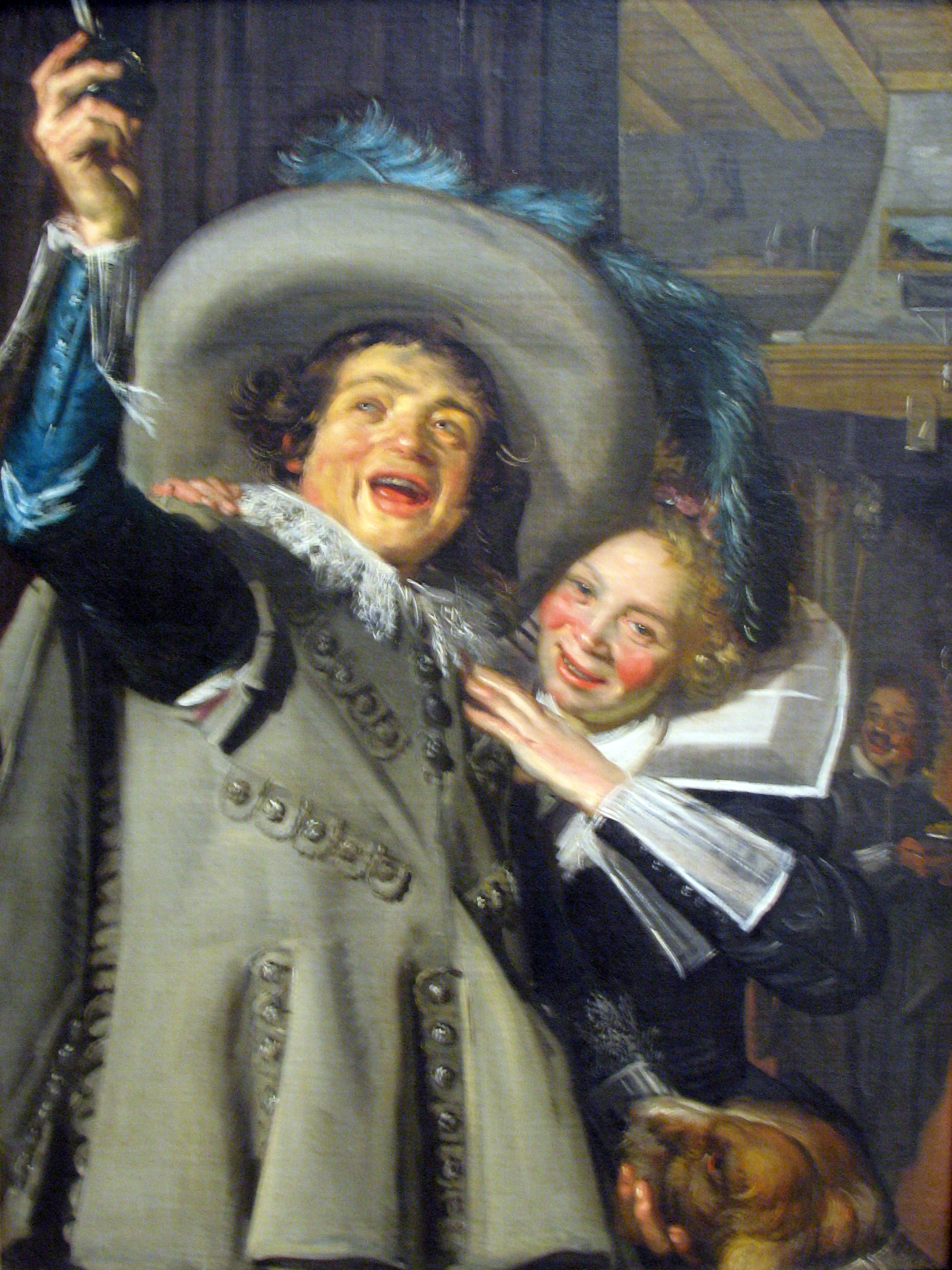
Yonker Ramp and his sweetheart

He moved to the Hague in 1630 where he later died.
