= Yonker Ramp and His Sweetheart =

Painting by Frans Hals

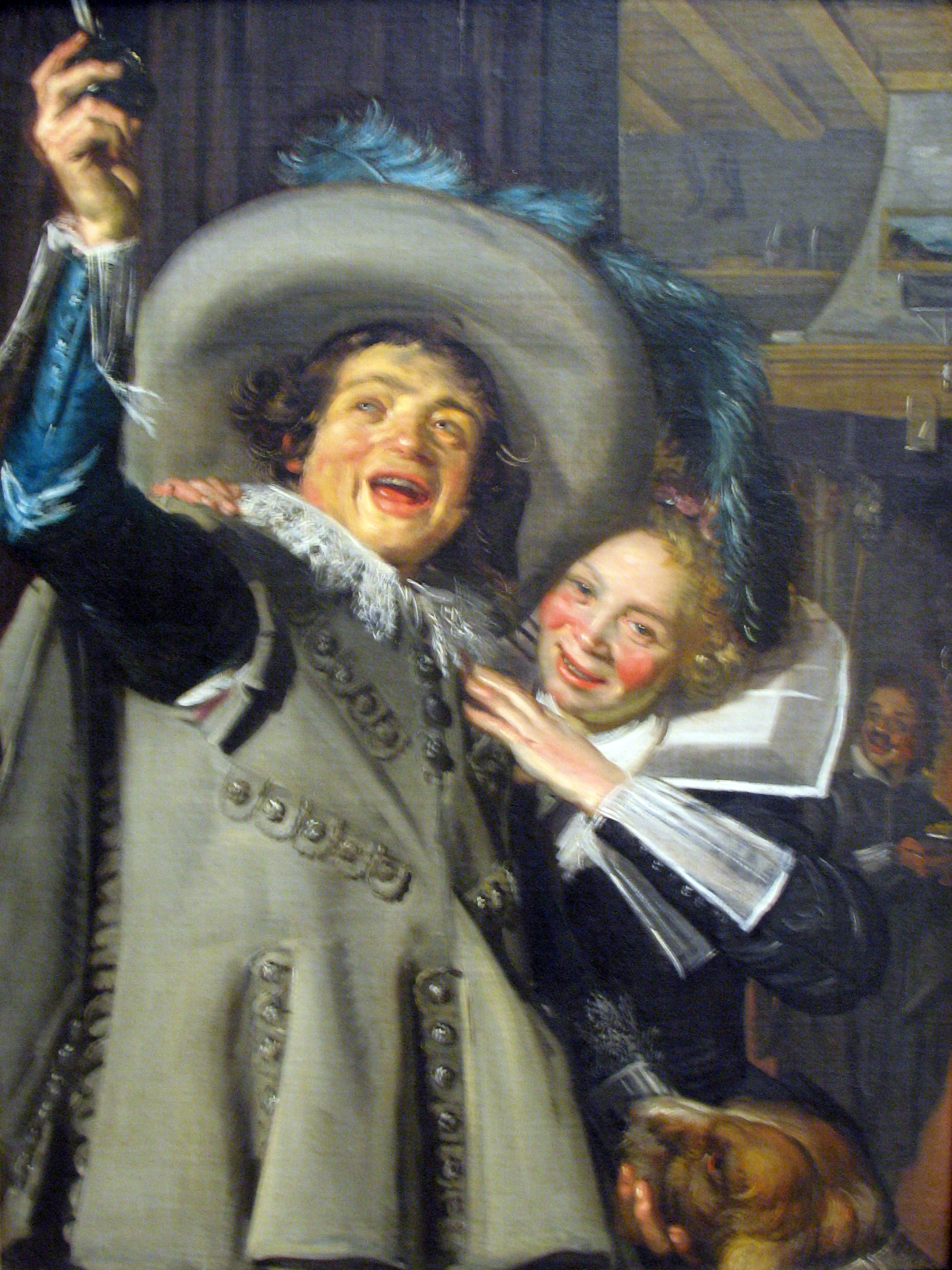
- Yonker Ramp and His Sweetheart, c.1623. Oil on canvas, 105 x 79 cm
- Artist: Frans Hals
- Year: 1623
- Catalogue: Seymour Slive, Catalog 1974: #20
- Medium: Oil on canvas
- Dimensions: 105 cm × 79 cm (41 in × 31 in)
- Location: Metropolitan Museum of Art, Bequest of Benjamin Altman, 1913; New York City
- Accession: 14.40.602
- Website: MET online

Yonker Ramp and His Sweetheart is an oil-on-canvas painting by the Dutch Golden Age painter Frans Hals, painted in 1623 and now in the Metropolitan Museum of Art, New York City. The painting has also been titled as Young Man and Woman in an Inn or Portrait of Pieter Ramp.

== Painting ==
The painting shows the face of a smiling woman leaning up against a young cavalier who is holding a flask above his head as if he has just taken it from her, apparently as part of a joke. With his left hand, the young cavalier is holding the head of a dog. The couple stand before a partially open curtain which shows a room beyond with a smiling man carrying a dish and a burning fireplace behind him.

== Name ==
The painting was for a long time considered to be a portrait of a young ensign of the Haarlem schutterij, Pieter Ramp. This has been rejected however as the female shows a strong resemblance to the young woman portrayed in Hals' Shrovetide Revellers. Both are considered to be genre works today, so the models could be anyone in Hals circle such as his children or pupils. In his 1910 catalog of Frans Hals works Hofstede de Groot noted this painting had a copy in London and wrote:

139. JUNKER RAMP AND HIS GIRL. B. 13; M. 209.- In an interior a young cavalier, seen to the hips, stands facing three-quarters right. He wears a doublet with lace collar and wristbands, and a broad-brimmed hat with a plume. In his right hand he holds up a wine-glass, at which he laughs heartily. He grasps with his left hand the head of a dog, which is in the right-hand bottom corner. Behind him to the right stands a girl who smiles at the spectator. She lays her right hand on his right shoulder, and touches his left shoulder with her left hand. In the right background is a chimney-piece with two long pictures. In front of it a young man comes forward; he looks towards the left and carries something. On the left, beside the chimney-piece, hangs another picture. Signed on the edge of the chimney-piece, F. Hals 1623; canvas on panel, 42 inches by 31 inches. A repetition of this picture is in the Heseltine collection [see 140]. Sales. J. A. Versijden van Varick, Leyden, October 29, 1791, No. 103 (130 florins). Copes van Hasselt of Haarlem, Amsterdam, April 20, 1880, No. 1. Pourtales, Paris. In the possession of the London dealer Duveen. In the collection of B. Altman, New York.

In his 1989 catalog of the international Frans Hals exhibition (which did not include this painting because it can never be lent out) Slive claimed it is the only genre work by Hals that is dated. Slive did mention in his discussion of Hals' Four evangelists that another interpretation is possible, namely that this painting could possibly be a Hals interpretation of the biblical Prodigal son. In the same year that Slive was writing, Claus Grimm rejected the attribution of this painting to Frans Hals, though he conceded it was probably after a painting by Hals, calling it a copy of a lost original.

Hals' positioning of the two figures with a major figure accompanied by "an accomplice" was common to many of his paintings of the 1620s:

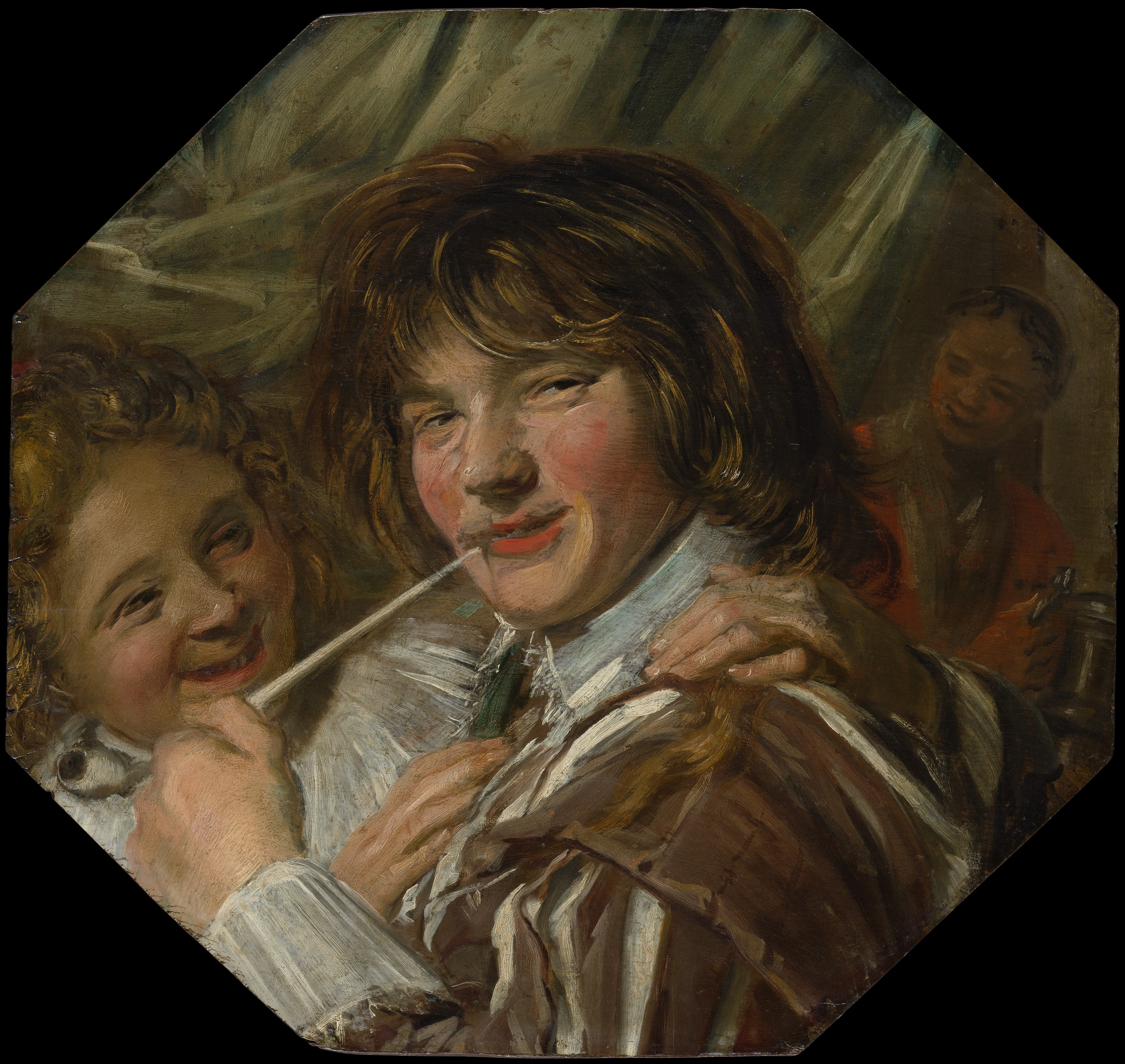
The Smoker, with an accomplice on the left and another in the background on the right

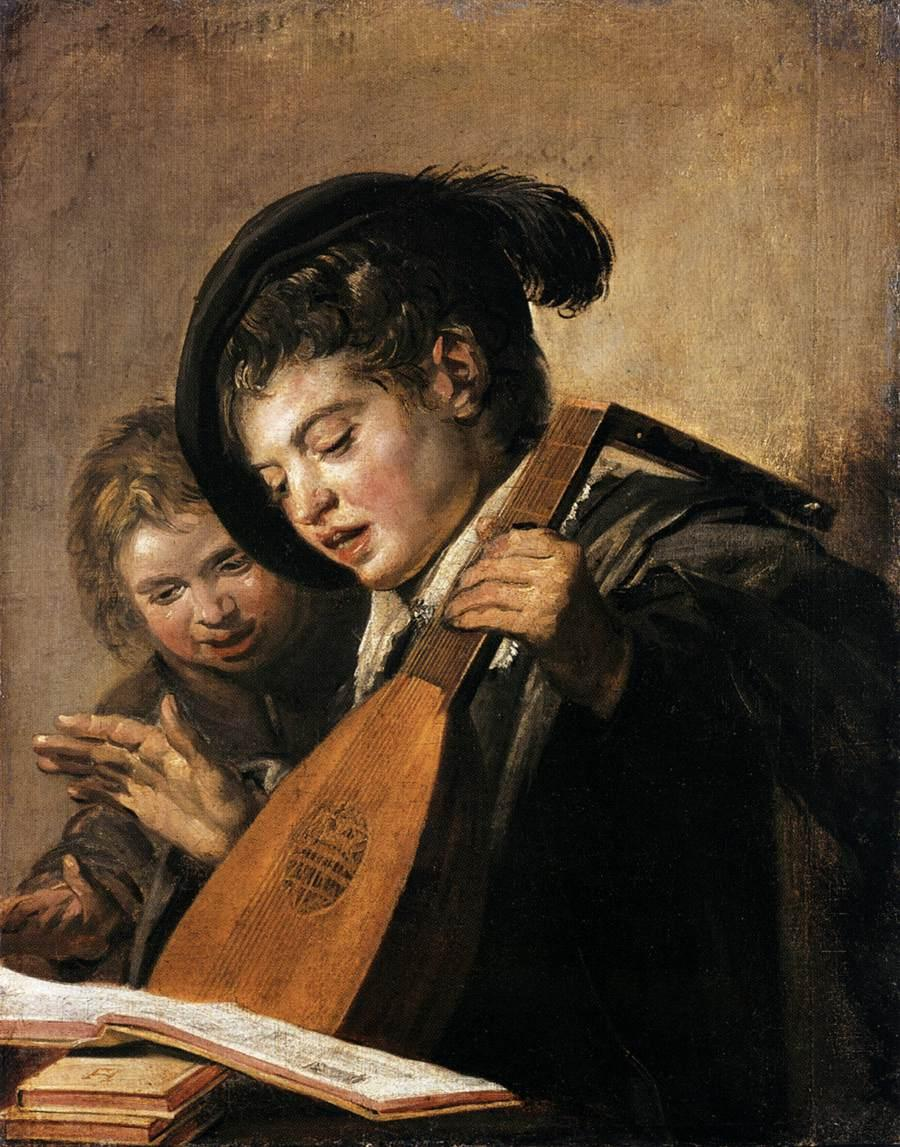
Two Boys singing, with an accomplice on the left

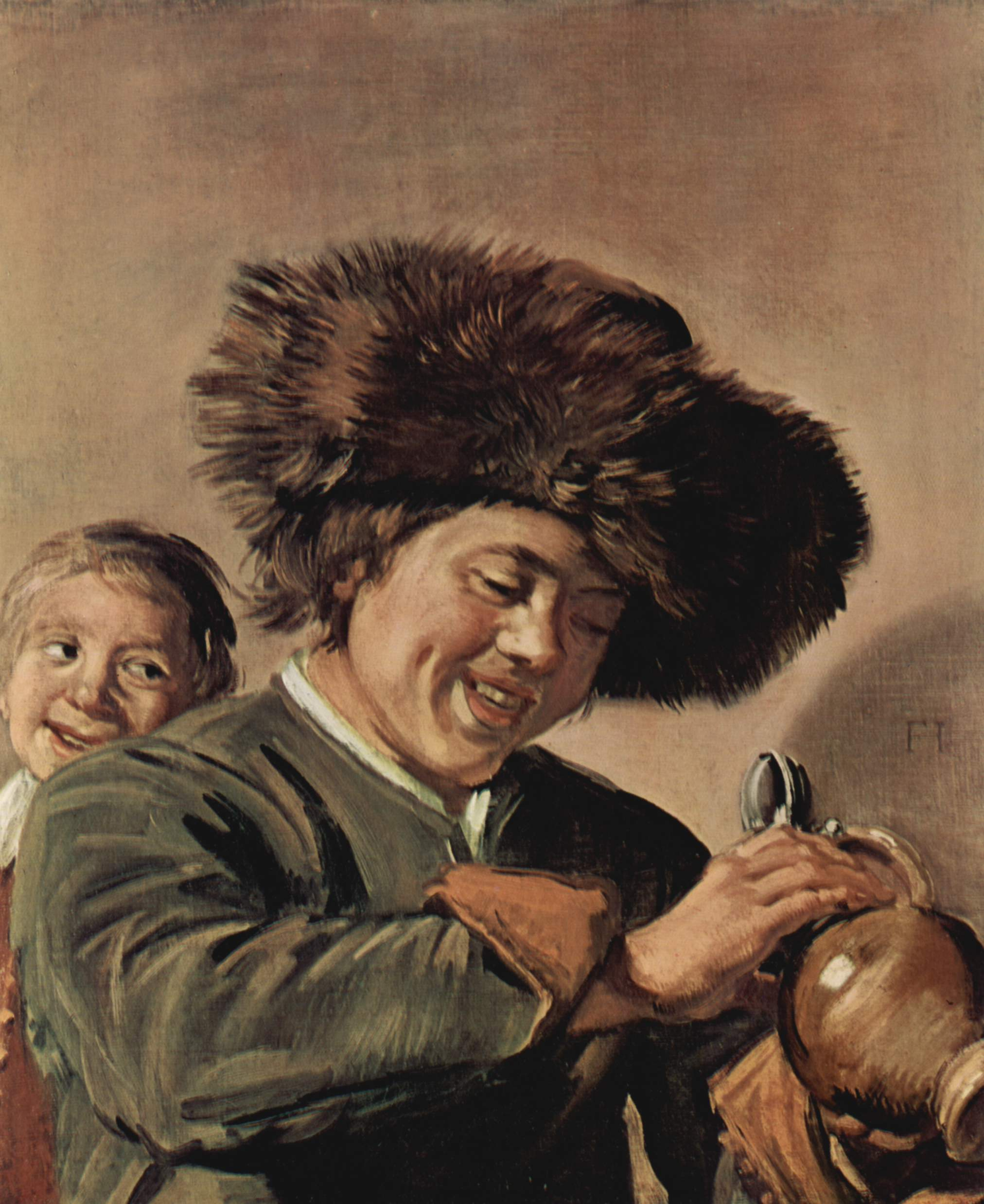
Two laughing boys with mug of beer, with an accomplice on the right

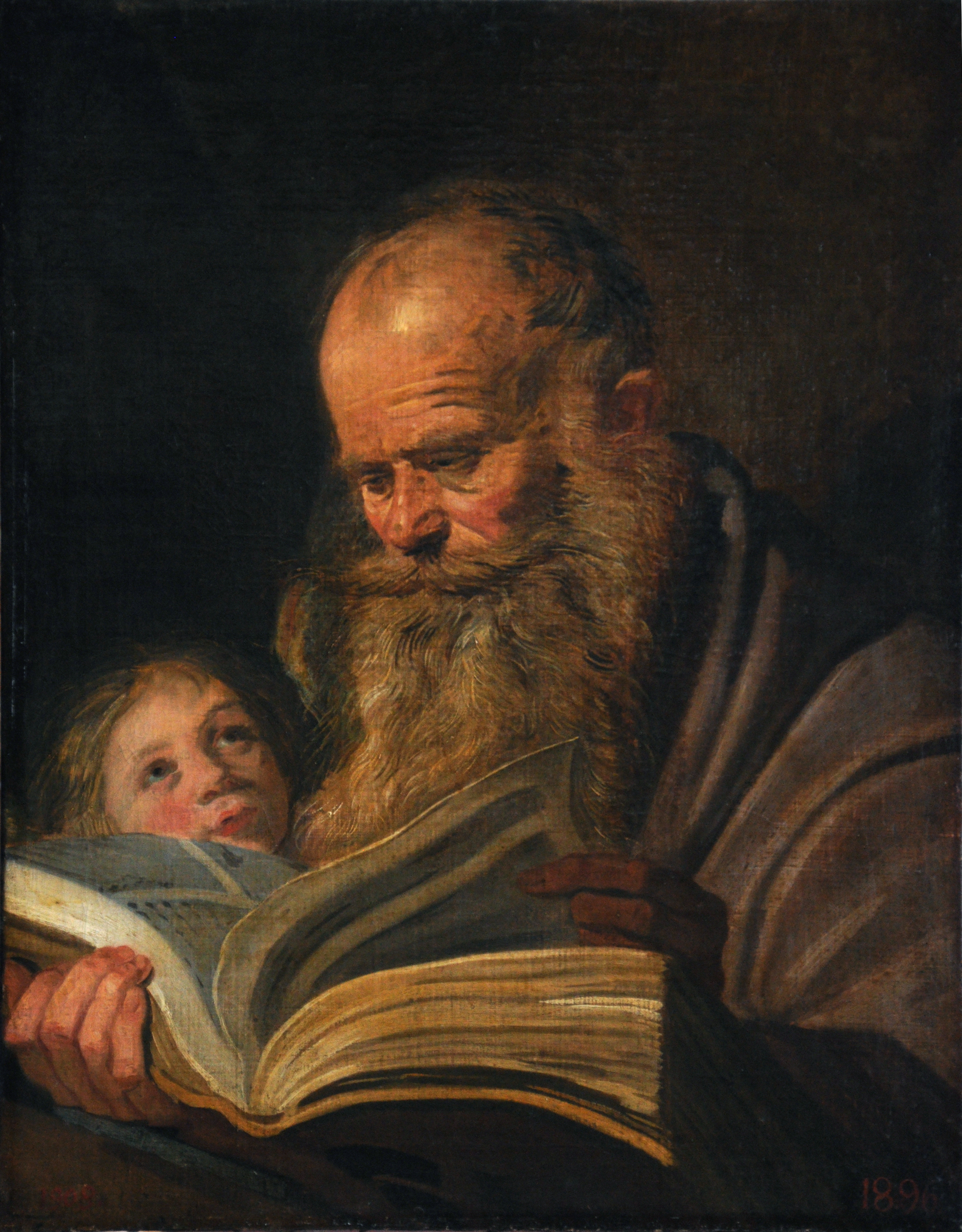
The evangelist Matthew and the angel, with an accomplice on the left

== See also ==
- List of paintings by Frans Hals
- Kraantje Lek - an old inn (now a restaurant) near Haarlem where this painting was (possibly) painted
