= Banquet of the Officers of the Calivermen Civic Guard, Haarlem =

Painting by Frans Hals

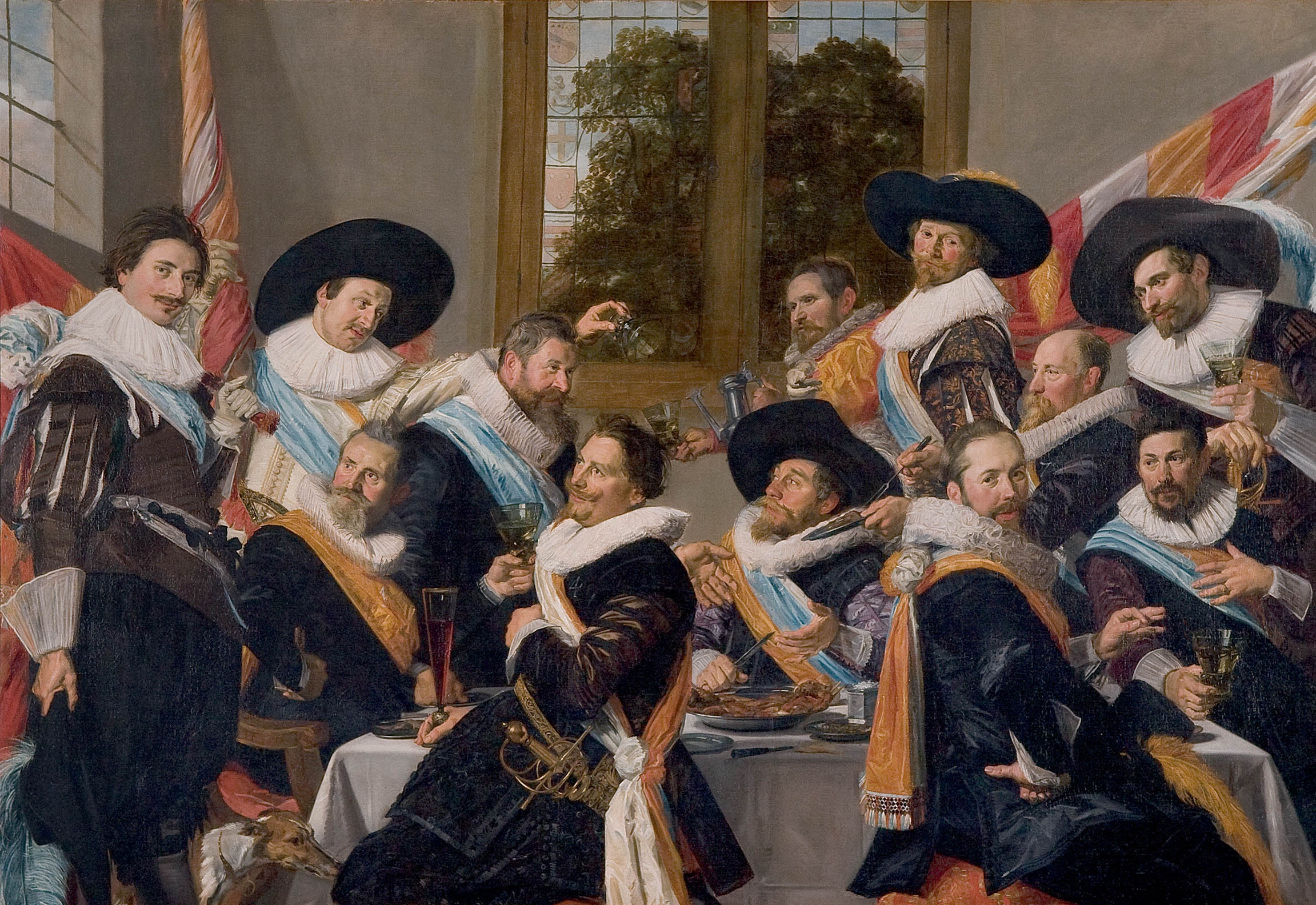
- Artist: Frans Hals
- Year: 1627
- Medium: Oil on canvas
- Dimensions: 183 cm × 226.5 cm (72 in × 89.2 in)
- Location: Frans Hals Museum; Haarlem, Netherlands

Banquet of the officers of the Calivermen Civic Guard, Haarlem formerly known as The Banquet of the Officers of the St Adrian Militia Company in 1627, refers to a schutterstuk painted by Frans Hals, in 1627, for the St. Adrian (or St. Hadrian) civic guard of Haarlem. Today it is considered one of the main attractions of the Frans Hals Museum, in Haarlem.

== Description ==
Unlike other schutterstukken with each sash being the color of the "rot" or civic guard district, in this painting all officers are wearing the colors of the Dutch flag - oranje-blanje-bleu. However, one can see some small differences in the flag bearers, with Adriaen Matham on the left holding a hat with blue feather and wearing mostly blue in his sash, on his left the ensign Loth Schout wearing a white jacket, and standing on the right by the window, the ensign Pieter Ramp wearing a jacket with lovely cut sleeves featuring orange brocade and an orange feather in his hat.

At the time Hals made his painting, Haarlem had three civic guard districts divided among the various "rot-masters". Officers were selected by the council of Haarlem to serve for three years, and this group had just finished their tenure and celebrated their end of service with a portrait. The man with the orange sash sitting at the table on the left and looking at Adriaen Matham is Willem Claesz Voogt, heading the table.

The men featured are, from left to right: Ensign Adriaen Matham, Ensign Loth Schout, Colonel Willem Claesz Voogt, Fiscaal Johan Damius, Captain Johan Schatter (seated in front), Captain Gilles de Wildt (seated behind the table with knife in hand), Servant Willem Ruychaver (standing behind him holding a pitcher), Captain Willem Warmont (seated in front), Ensign Pieter Ramp, Lieutenant Outgert Ariss Akersloot (offering a dish to Fiscaal Damius), Lieutenant Claes van Napels (standing with white plume), and Lieutenant Matthys Haeswindius (seated at the foot of the table). The dog in the lower left is a greyhound and the name for this in Dutch is hazewind, which may be meant to indicate the relationship between the ensign Adriaen Matham and his lieutenant Haeswindius seated on the right.

== St. Adriansdoelen ==
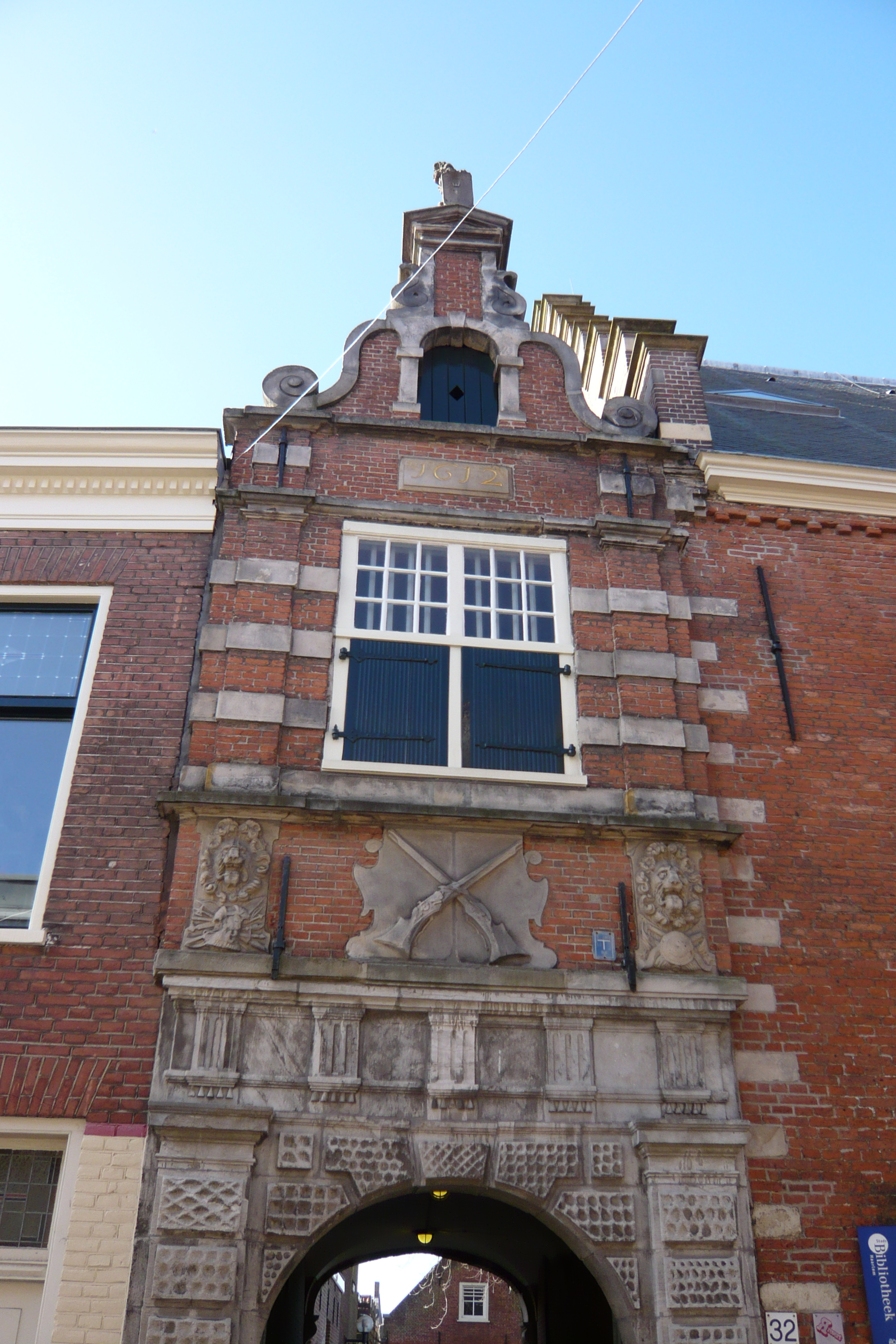
View of the gate to the Doelen; the keystone shows the weapons they carried.

The painting previously hung with others in the old "Doelen" building, known today as the Haarlem Public Library. The paintings by Hals and others hung in the main hall of the building in the Gasthuisstraat. Today a study hall, the room was used for years as a gymnasium, and some of the older schutterstukken were damaged from enthusiastic gymnasts over the years. Today all of the schutterstukken that once hung here have been transferred to the Frans Hals Museum.

== See also ==
- Haarlem schutterij
- List of paintings by Frans Hals
- The Officers of the St Adrian Militia Company in 1633
