= Johan Damius =

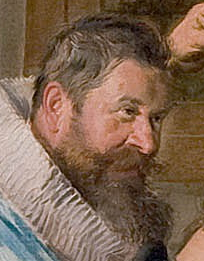
Johan Damius, detail of schutterstuk by Frans Hals in 1627

Johan Damius (1570 – 15 December 1648), was a Dutch Golden Age member of the Haarlem schutterij.

== Biography ==
He was born in Ladenburg a/d Neckar as the son of Johannes Dammius who moved to Haarlem before 1578 where he gave the first Protestant sermon in the Grote Kerk, Haarlem after Haarlem was freed from Spanish (Catholic) occupation. The young Damius was educated along with his brother Mathias to become a doctor, but both brothers later became political rebels after their father died in 1612, acting against the remonstrant council of Haarlem in 1618. Mathias was banned from the city for supporting Adriaen Jacobsz Tetrode and Daniel de Souter when he published 3 contra-remonstrant pamphlets in 1617 starting with Requeste der dolerende Kercke te Haerlem. He and his brother were reinstated after the political changeover in 1618. Johan became a judge and later mayor.

He also became captain of the St Adrian militia in 1619-1621 and 1624-1625, becoming fiscaal/provost in 1625-1627. He was married twice; to Catharina van Deutekom on 6 February 1596 and to Anna van Offenberg 29 October 1620.

He was portrayed by Frans Hals in his militia group portrait or schutterstuk, The Banquet of the Officers of the St Adrian Militia Company in 1627. Anna was the cousin of Boudewijn van Offenberg, the flag bearer in the pendant of this painting, painted in the same year for the St. George militia: The Banquet of the Officers of the St George Militia Company in 1627.

He died in Haarlem.
