= Kanzelbach =

River in Germany

Kanzelbach Kandelbach
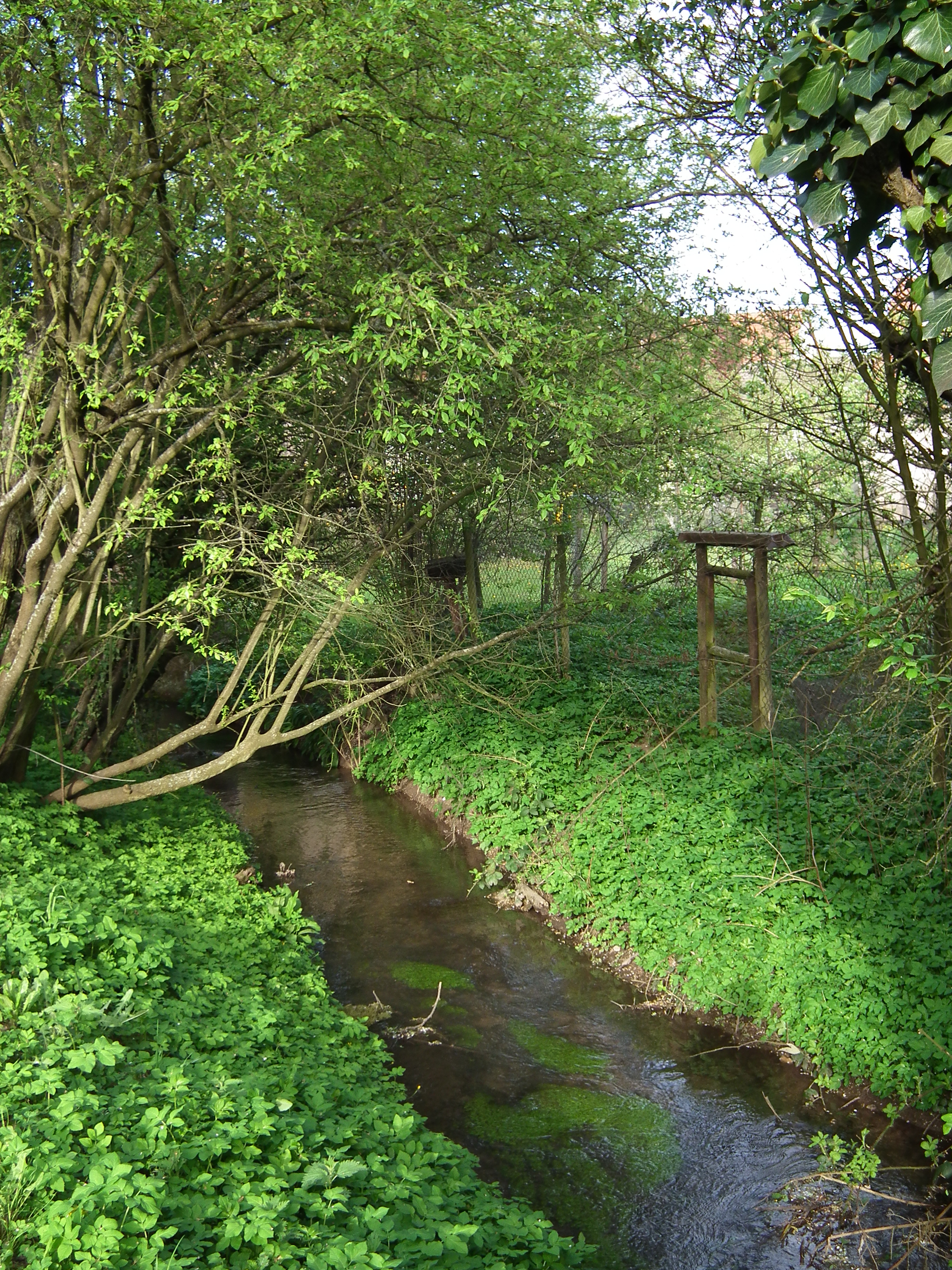

Location
- Country: Germany
- State: Baden-Württemberg

Physical characteristics
- Mouth
  - location: Neckar
  - coordinates: 49°27′54″N 8°36′20″E
- Length: 12.9 km (8.0 mi)

Basin features
- Progression: Neckar→ Rhine→ North Sea

The Kanzelbach, called Kandelbach in Ladenburg, is a river in Baden-Württemberg, Germany. It flows into the Neckar in Ladenburg.

== See also ==
- List of rivers of Baden-Württemberg
