= Portrait of Mrs. Bodolphe =

Painting by Frans Hals

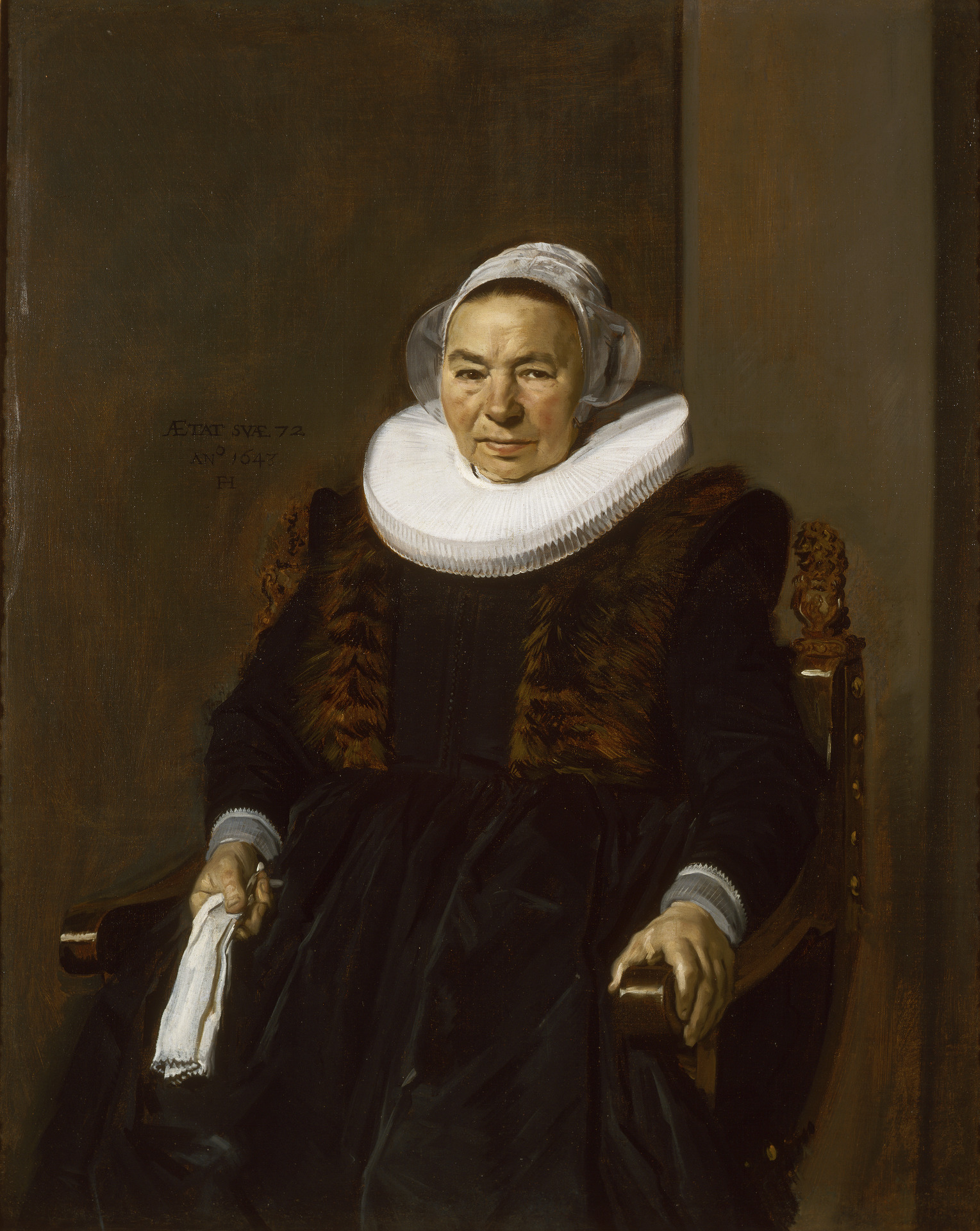
- Portrait of an Elderly Woman, traditionally called Mevrouw Bodolphe
- Artist: Frans Hals
- Year: 1643
- Catalogue: Seymour Slive, Catalog 1974: #150
- Medium: Oil on canvas
- Dimensions: 122.4 cm × 97.5 cm (48.2 in × 38.4 in)
- Location: Yale University Art Gallery, New Haven
- Accession: 1961.18.24

Portrait of Mrs. Bodolphe is an oil-on-canvas painting by the Dutch Golden Age painter Frans Hals, painted in 1643 as half of a pair of pendant marriage portraits and is still together with its pendant in the Yale University Art Gallery, New Haven, Connecticut.

== Painting ==
The painting is one of several portrait paintings of wealthy women of Haarlem that Hals made as female halves of marriage pendants, but this one seems to be executed for a second marriage or perhaps 50th wedding anniversary, considering the age of 72 of the sitter. The sitter herself remains unknown, though it and its pendant have been traditionally called "Bodolphe".

== Provenance ==
In his 1910 catalog of Frans Hals works Hofstede de Groot wrote:

158. MADAME BODOLPHE. B. 56; M. 106. Three-quarter- length, life size. An old woman sits in a carved chair, seen in full face, and looking at the spectator. She leans her left hand on the arm of her chair and holds her gloves in her right hand. She wears a dark dress trimmed with fur, a white ruff, and a close-fitting white linen cap. [Pendant to 157.] Signed on the left with the monogram, and inscribed, "AETAT SVAE 72 AN 1643 "; canvas, 48 inches by 38 1/2 inches. Exhibited by the London dealers T. Agnew and Sons, November and December 1906. Exhibited at the Hudson-Fulton Celebration, Metropolitan Museum, New York, 1909, No. 34. Sale. Odier, Paris, March 25, 1861. In the collection of Count Andre Mniszech, Paris. In the collection of J. Pierpont Morgan; exhibited on loan in the Metropolitan Museum, New York.

This painting came into the collection via the bequest of school alumnus Stephen Carlton Clark in 1961. It was selected in 1939 along with Portrait of a Man with a Beer Jug by the New York art historian Thomas Craven to contrast Hals' earlier, more colorful genre work with his more subdued later portraits. Recently research into the costumes of Haarlemmers in the 17th-century has revealed that portraits with small wrist collars like hers, or indeed lacking them as her husband does, may indicate the Mennonite faith. This clue narrows the field for an eventual identification.

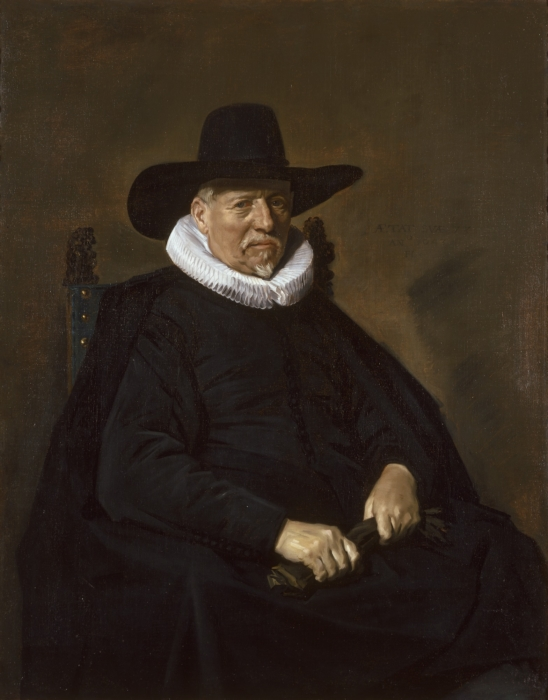
Mr. Bodolphe (no wrist collars)

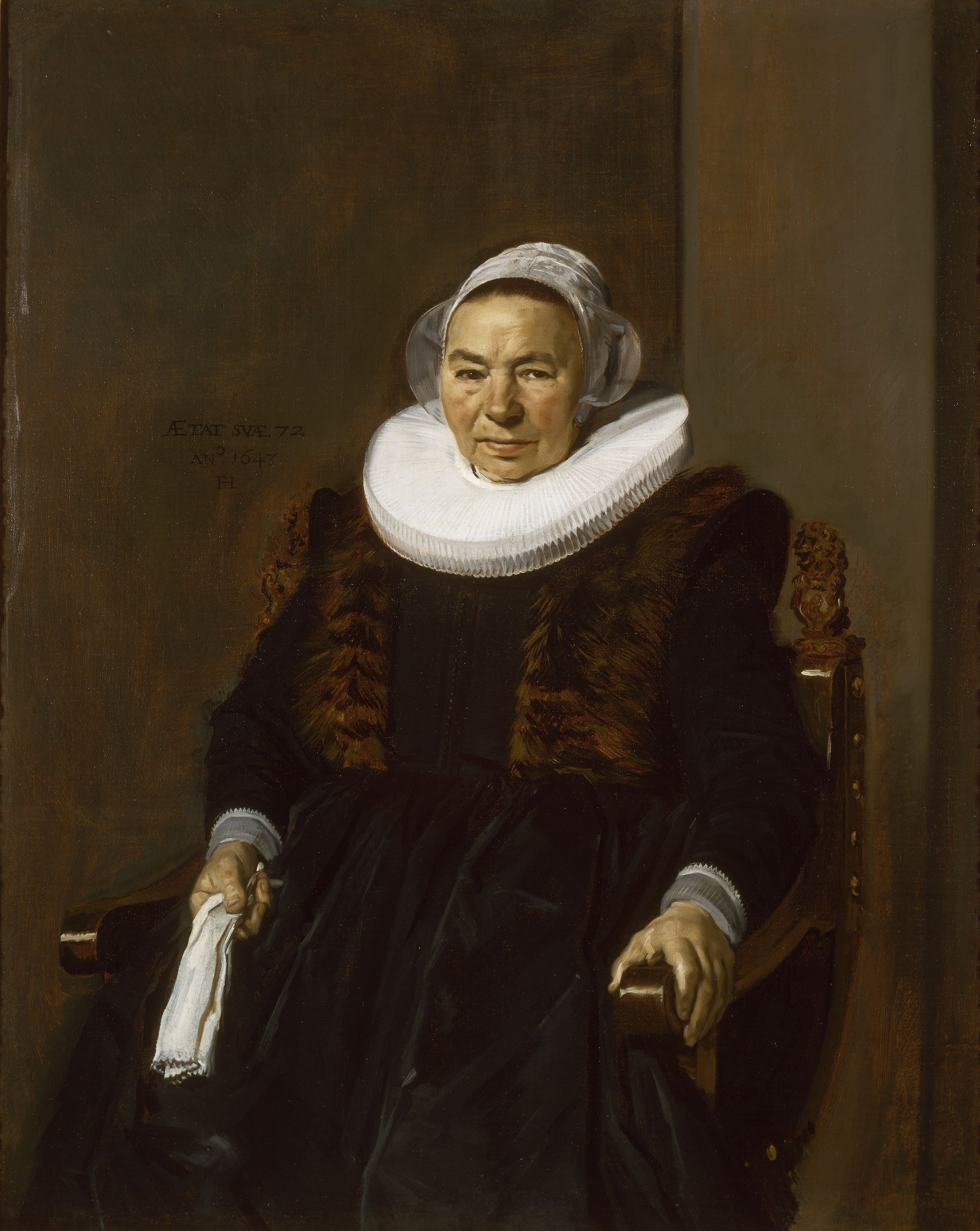
Mrs. Bodolphe (sober wrist collars)

== See also ==
- List of paintings by Frans Hals
