= The Smoker =

Painting by Frans Hals

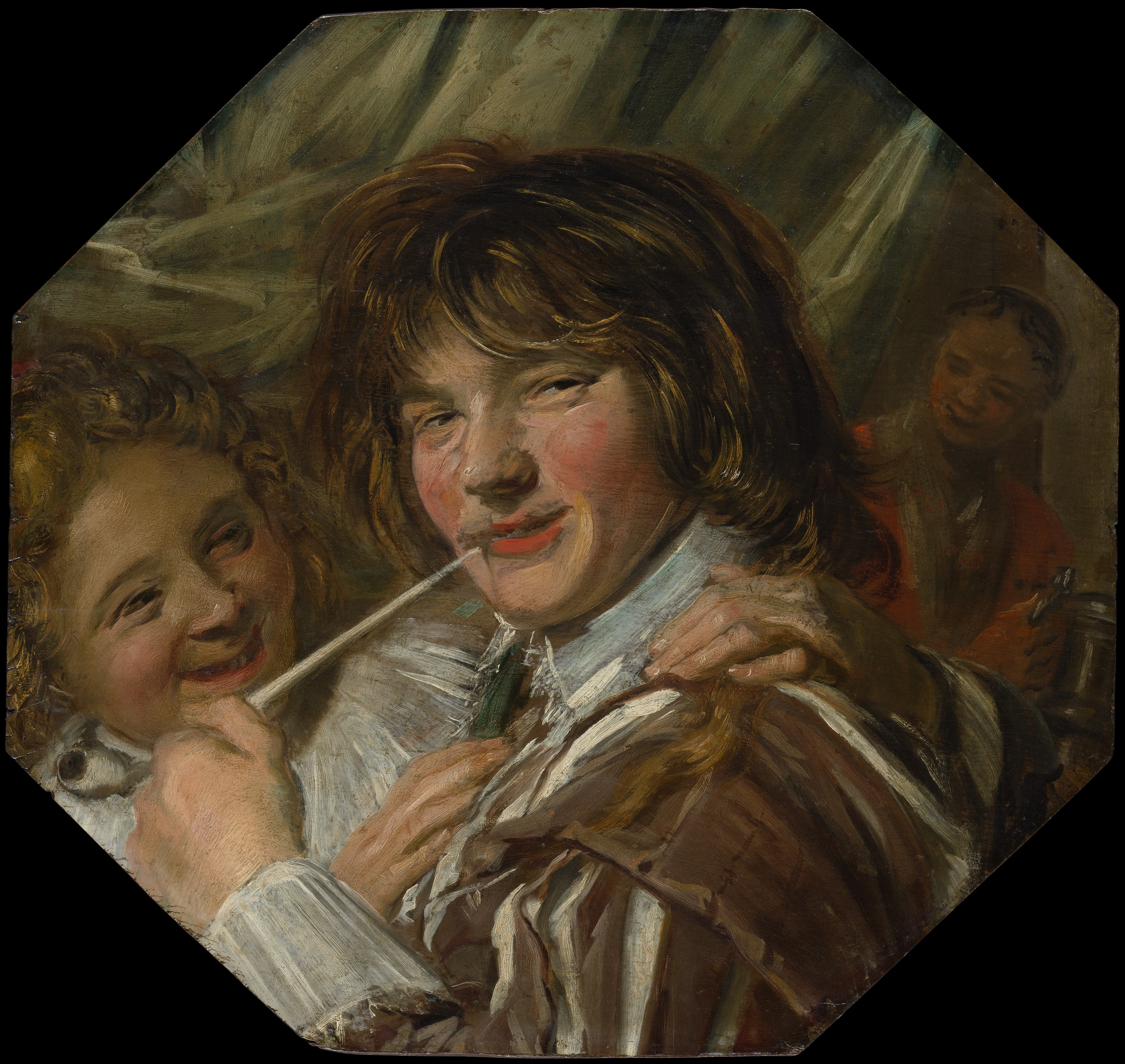
- The Smoker (Three Heads), c.1626. Oil on panel, 46.7 x 49.5 cm octagonal
- Artist: Frans Hals
- Year: 1626
- Catalogue: Seymour Slive, Catalog 1974: #21
- Medium: Oil on panel
- Dimensions: 46.7 cm × 49.5 cm (18.4 in × 19.5 in)
- Location: Metropolitan Museum of Art Marquand Collection 1889; New York City
- Accession: 89.15.34
- Website: MET online

The Smoker is an oil-on-panel painting by the Dutch Golden Age painter Frans Hals, painted in 1626 and now in the Metropolitan Museum of Art, New York City.

== Painting ==
The painting is also known as Three Heads and shows a boy wearing a tassel collar puffing on a long Dutch clay pipe with his head facing the viewer while another youngster in a wide collar hugs him and behind them a woman wearing a kerchief can be seen holding a tin can.

== Name ==
In his 1910 catalog of Frans Hals works Hofstede de Groot called this painting a copy of a round version and wrote:

133. THE SMOKER AND HIS GIRL. B. 114; M. 211,212. In the centre is the head of a youth, seen almost in full face but inclined to the left. He holds a long clay pipe in his left hand. Behind him to the left is the head of a girl looking at him. Her left hand rests on his left shoulder. In the right background the head of an old woman is sketched in light green. Behind the heads of the youth and girl is a curtain. Very expressive and broadly painted. In excellent preservation. Dated by Bode about 1625. Circular panel, 14 inches in diameter. An octagonal replica on panel, 17 1/2 inches by 18 1/2 inches is in the Metropolitan Museum, New York, 1905 catalogue, No. 234. It was shown at the Royal Academy Winter Exhibition, London, 1887, No. 95; it was then in the collection of R. G. Wilberforce, London. It came into the collection of Henry G. Marquand, New York, who presented it to the Museum in 1888. The smoker's head is very good and quite worthy of Frans Hals; the other two heads are less good. The right hand of the man shows a variation from the original; here he holds the pipe with the forefinger, not between forefinger and thumb. Besides, the figure of the woman to the right is much bigger and holds a jug. In the Von Hippel collection. Given to Konigsberg with other pictures from the collection through Regierungs-president Von Hippel of Bromberg, 1837. In the Konigsberg Municipal Museum, 1894 catalogue, No. 75.

This painting could be related to the pendants at Schwerin in which a boy is wearing a similar split-sleeve jacket. That pair has long been considered to be part of a series on the five senses, where the boy with the flute symbolizes hearing and the drinking boy symbolizes taste:

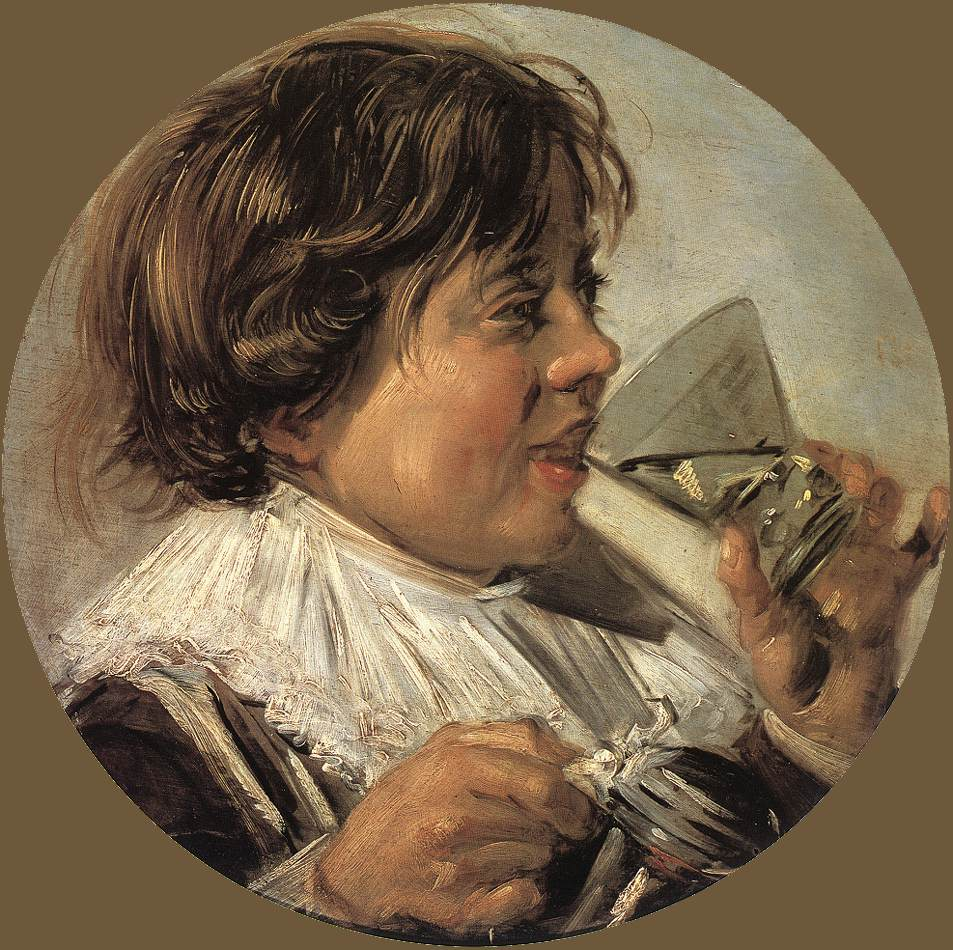
Boy with a glass and a pewter jug

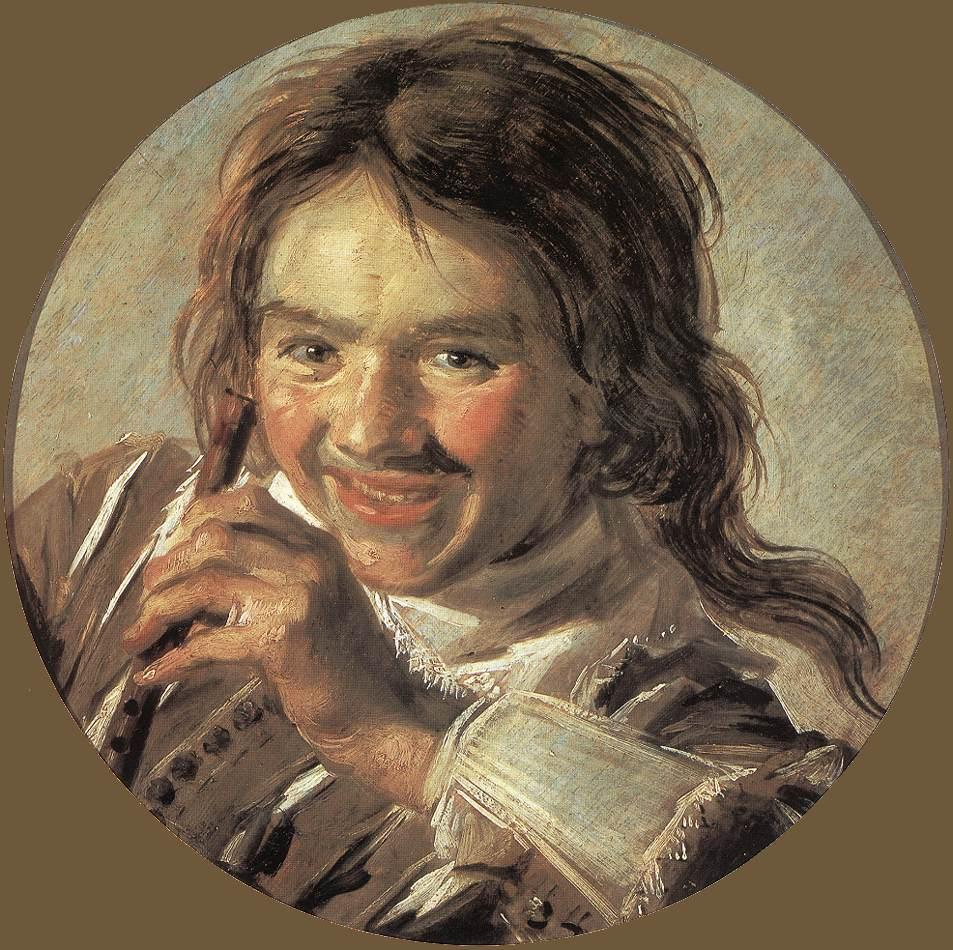
Laughing boy with a flute

Hals' positioning of the two figures with a major figure accompanied by "an accomplice" was common to many of his paintings of the 1620s:

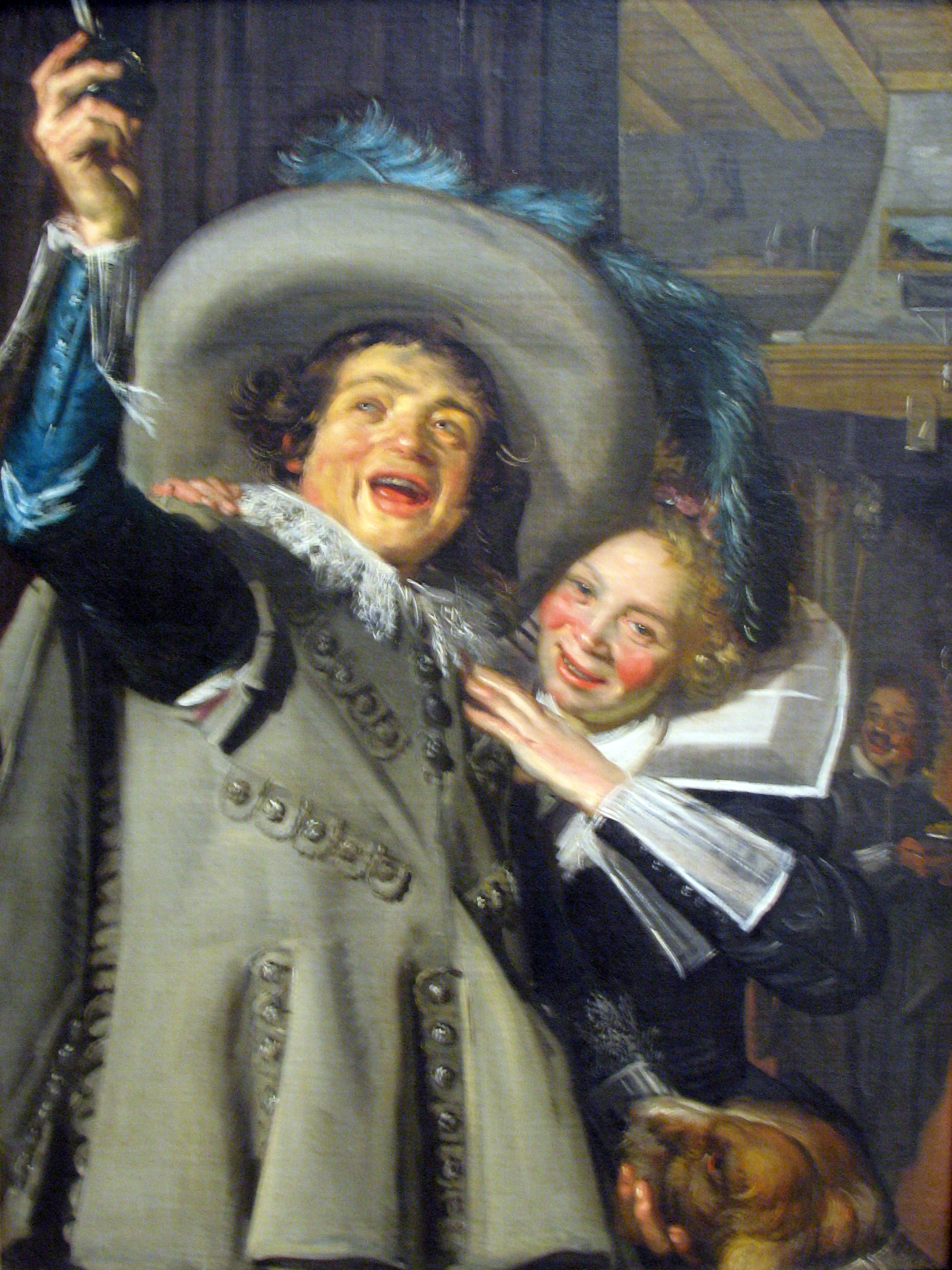
Yonker Ramp and his sweetheart, with an accomplice on the right and another in the background on the right

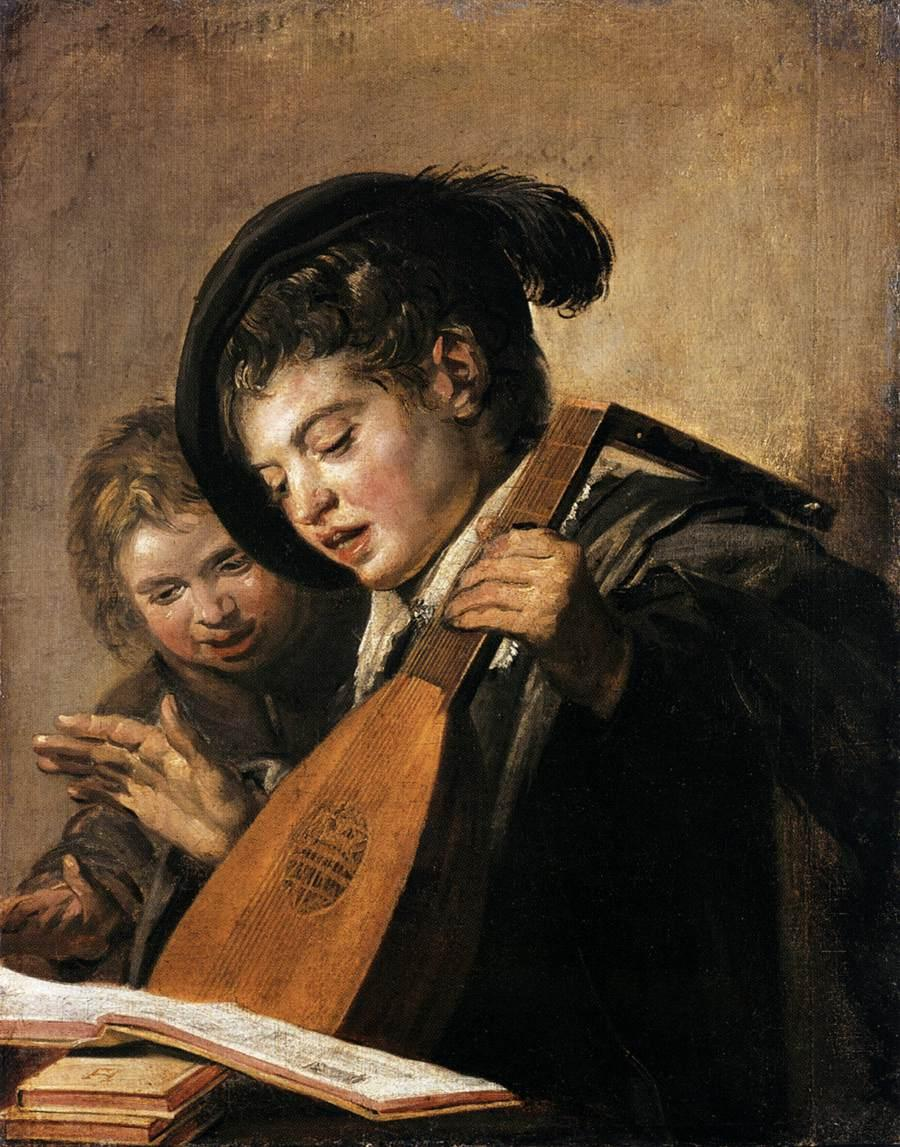
Two Boys singing, with an accomplice on the left

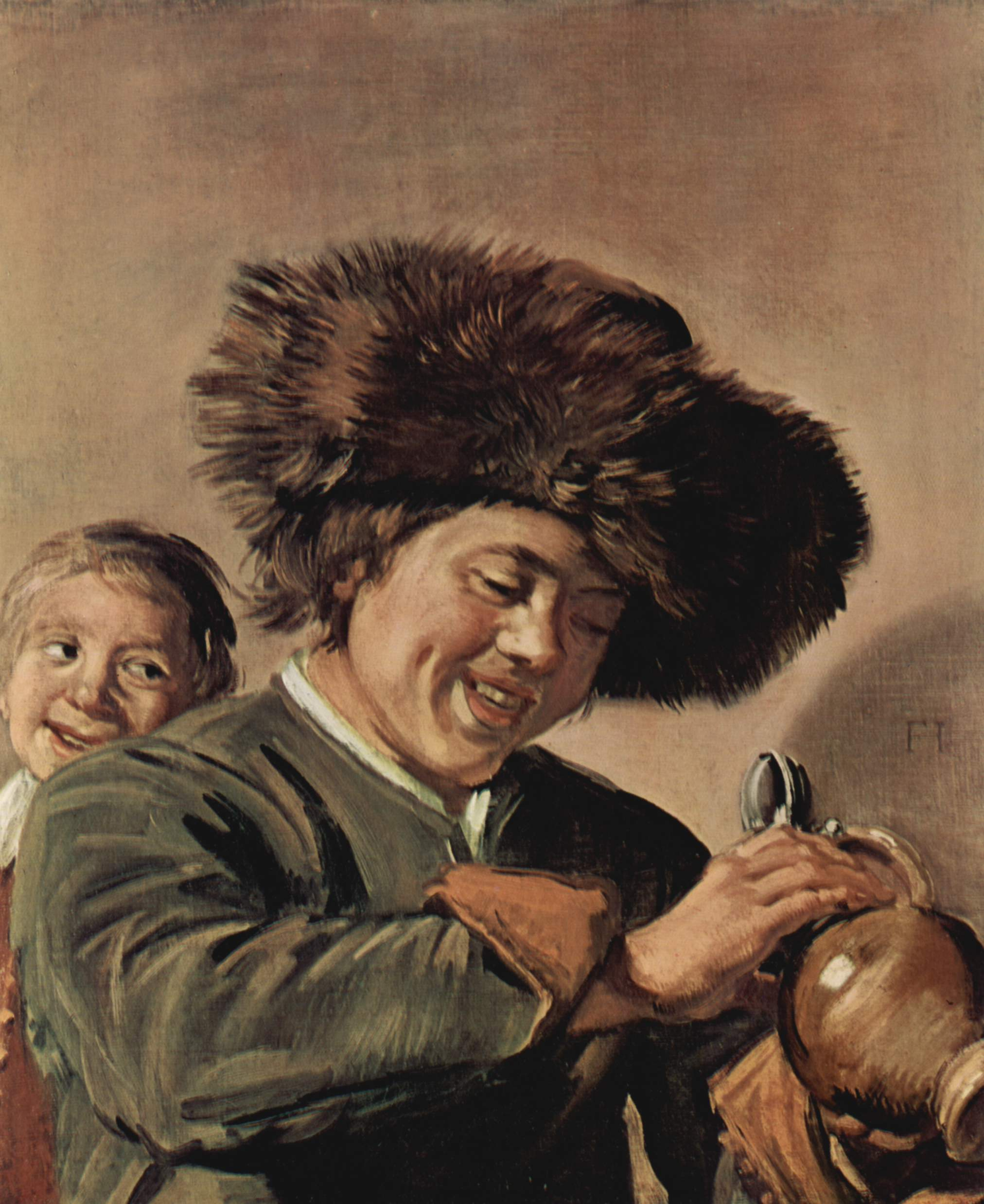
Two laughing boys with mug of beer, with an accomplice on the right

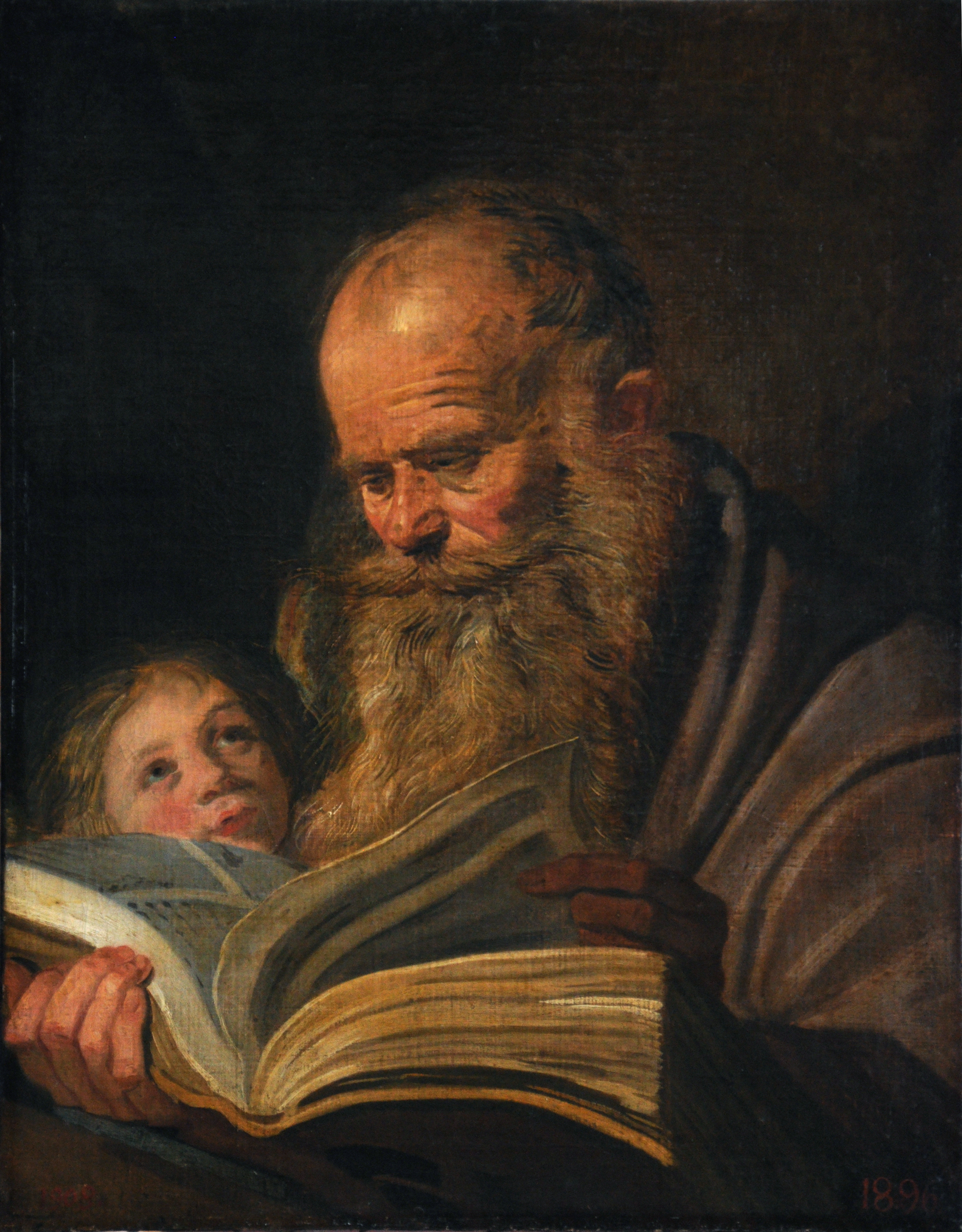
The evangelist Matthew and the angel, with an accomplice on the left

== See also ==
- List of paintings by Frans Hals
