= Portrait of a Man in a Yellowish-Gray Jacket =

Painting by Frans Hals

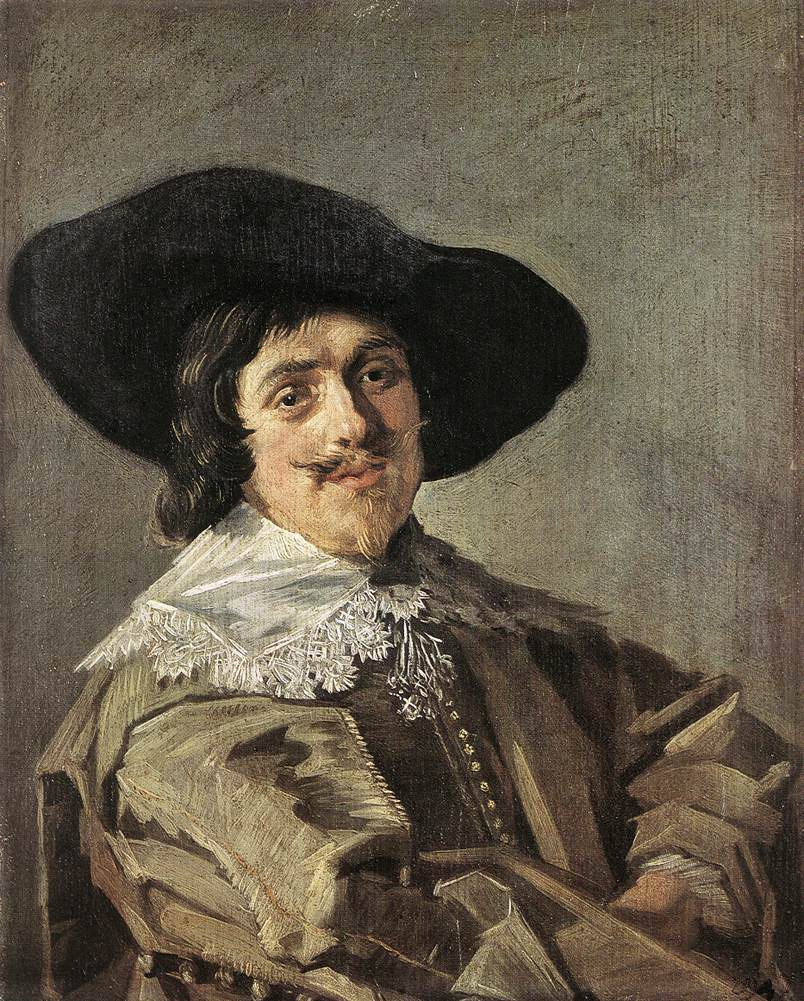
- Portrait of a Man in a Yellowish-gray Jacket, c.1633. Oil on oak panel, 24.5 x 19.5 cm
- Artist: Frans Hals
- Year: 1633
- Catalogue: Seymour Slive, Catalog 1974: #90
- Medium: Oil on canvas
- Dimensions: 24.5 cm × 19.5 cm (9.6 in × 7.7 in)
- Location: Staatliche Kunstsammlungen Dresden; Dresden
- Accession: 1358
- Website: skd-online-collection

Portrait of a Man in a Yellowish-gray Jacket is an oil-on-panel portrait painting by the Dutch Golden Age painter Frans Hals, painted in 1633 and now in the Staatliche Kunstsammlungen Dresden, Dresden.

== Painting ==
The painting shows a tastefully dressed young man in a floppy hat seated in a chair facing right with his head at an angle looking at the viewer. We don't know the name of the man or the occasion for which it was painted, but the painting is probably a pendant to the portrait of a man in a black jacket, which it matches in shape, size, period, and position of the figures. If so, it was possibly once a pair of portraits of organisation owners, or two men who lived together, because Hals was quite consistent with his pendant wedding portraits; positioning the man on the left and the woman on the right. This allowed the light which always shines from the left in his paintings, to shine directly on the woman's face and not the man's. In this case however, the portrait on the left is painted in lighter tones than the portrait on the right. Possibly these pendant portraits were made to decorate a building, so that people who worked for them or visited the premises could know what the owners looked like.

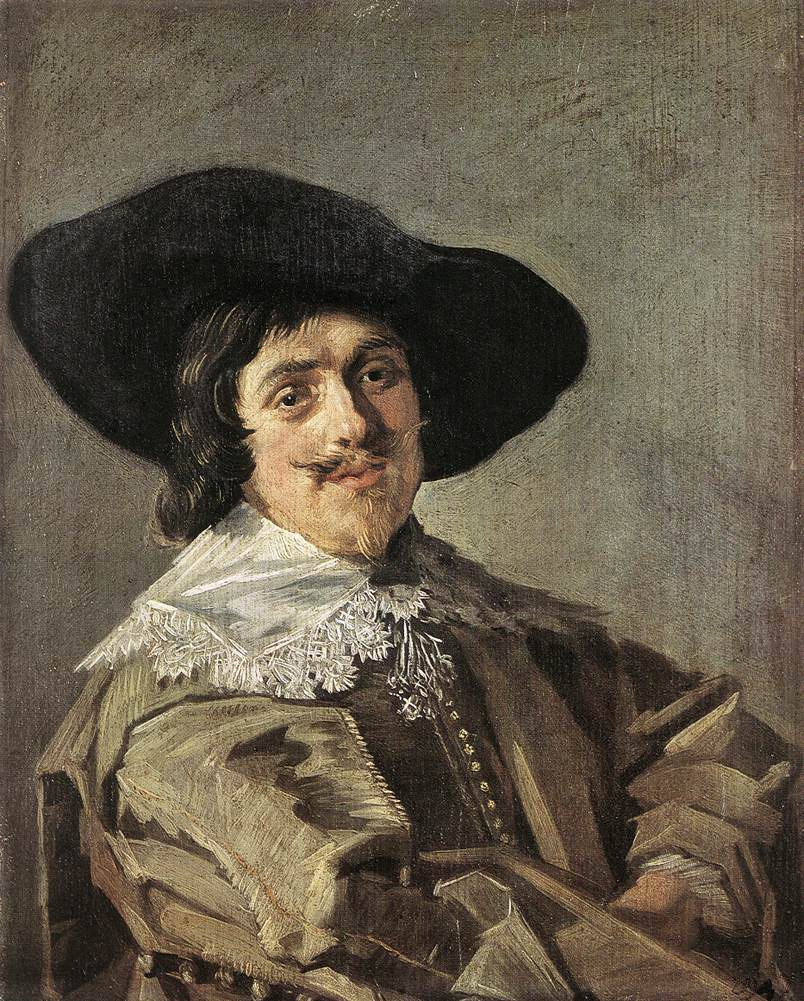

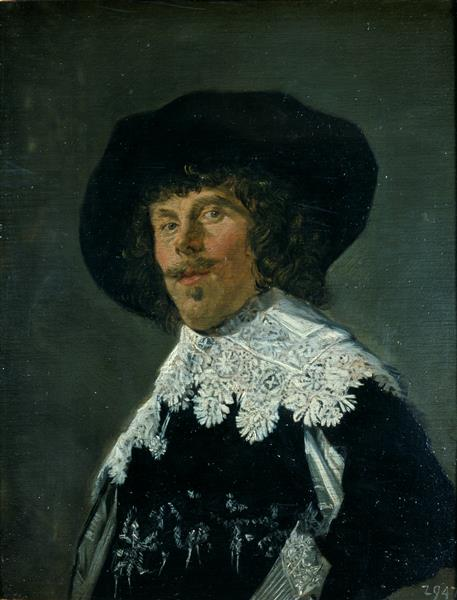

== Provenance ==
The painting is one of the best documented paintings in Hals' oeuvre, documented by Wilhelm von Bode in 1883, by Ernst Wilhelm Moes in 1909, Hofstede de Groot in 1910, by W.R. Valentiner in 1923, Trivas in 1941 and by Gerrit David Gratama in 1946. Both Seymour Slive and Claus Grimm agree it is by Hals.

In 1910 Hofstede de Groot recorded the two small portraits as pendants:

271. PORTRAIT OF A MAN SEATED. B. 105; M. 169. Half-length. He is turned three-quarters right, and looks at the spectator. His left hand is pressed to his side. He has a light-brown moustache and pointed beard, and dark-brown hair. He wears a broad- brimmed black hat of soft felt, a yellowish-grey coat, a close-fitting white collar edged with lace, and a white wristband on his right hand. Grey background. [Pendant to 272.]

Panel, 9 1/2 inches by 7 1/2 inches. A copy was exhibited at the Burlington Fine Arts Club, London, 1900, No. 32, and was in the sale: James Orrock, London, June 4, 1904, No. 265 (for 330 pounds and 15 schillings).

Acquired from the Wallenstein collection, Dux, 1741. In the Dresden Gallery, 1908 catalogue, No. 1358.

272. PORTRAIT OF A MAN. B. 106; M. 170. Half-length. His figure is in profile to the left; his head is turned three-quarters left. He looks at the spectator. The left hand, though not shown, is obviously pressed to his side. He has a slight fair moustache and imperial, and dark- brown curls. He wears a broad-brimmed black hat of soft felt and a black coat, showing the white shirt, with a close-fitting lace collar. [Pendant to 271.]

Panel, 9 1/2 inches by 8 inches.

Acquired from the Wallenstein collection, Dux, 1741. In the Dresden Gallery, 1908 catalogue, No. 1359.

== See also ==
- List of paintings by Frans Hals
