= List of paintings by Frans Hals =

The following is an incomplete list of paintings by Frans Hals that are generally accepted as autograph by the Frans Hals Museum and other sources. The list is more or less in order of creation, starting from around 1610 when Frans Hals began painting on his own. Prior to that he was employed by the Haarlem council as a city art restorer and before that he was assistant to Karel van Mander.

Image	Title	Year	Size	Inventory no.	Gallery	Location
	Portrait of Jacobus Zaffius	1611	54.6 x 41.2 cm	OSI-511/486	Frans Hals Museum	Haarlem
	Portrait of a Woman Standing	c.1611	94.2 × 71.1 cm	267 (pendant to 38.6)	Devonshire Collection	Chatsworth House
	Portrait of a Man Holding a Skull	c.1611	94 × 72.5 cm	38.6 (pendant to 267)	The Barber Institute of Fine Arts	Birmingham
	Portrait of an unknown man	1612–1616	73.7 × 55.2 cm	32.821	Brooklyn Museum	New York City, NY
	The Banquet of the Officers of the St George Militia Company in 1616	1616	175 × 324 cm	OSI-109	Frans Hals Museum	Haarlem
	Portrait of Pieter Cornelisz van der Morsch	1616	88.1 x 69.5 cm	61.42.2	Carnegie Museum of Art	Pittsburgh, PA
	Shrovetide Revellers	1616–1617	131.4 × 99.7 cm	14.40.605	The Metropolitan Museum of Art	New York City, NY
	Portrait of Theodorus Schrevelius	1617	14.5 x 12 cm	OS 2003–18	Frans Hals Museum	Haarlem
	Portrait of an unknown woman (face later replaced and landscape background added)	c.1618	112 x 91 cm		private collection	Toronto, Canada
	Portrait of a Woman Standing (Kassel)	1618–1620	103 × 82.5 cm	214 (pendant to 213)	Museum Schloss Wilhelmshöhe	Kassel, DE
	Portrait of a Man Standing (Kassel)	1618–1620	102.5 × 79 cm	213 (pendant to 214)	Museum Schloss Wilhelmshöhe	Kassel, DE
	The Rommelpot Player	1618–1622	106 × 80.3 cm		Kimbell Art Museum	Fort Worth, TX
	Portrait of an unknown man	1619	89 x 76 cm	1366	Musée des Beaux-Arts de Dijon	Dijon
	Portrait of Catharina Hooft with her Nurse	1619–1620	86 x 65 cm	801G	Gemäldegalerie	Berlin
	Two singing boys with a lute and a music book	1620–1625	76 x 52 cm	GK 215	Museum Schloss Wilhelmshöhe	Kassel, DE
	Young violin player	1620s	93 x 93 cm		private collection	London
	Portrait of Catharina Both van der Eem, possibly finished by Pieter Soutman	1620s	137.2 x 99.8 cm	R.F. 425 (pendant to R.F. 424)	Musée du Louvre	Paris
	Portrait of Paulus van Beresteyn	1620s	137.1 x 104 cm	R.F. 424 (pendant to R.F. 425)	Musée du Louvre	Paris
	Portrait of Three Children with a Goat Cart (fragment of Gijsbert Claesz van Campen family group)	c. 1620	152 x 107.5 cm	4732 (right fragment)	Koninklijke Musea voor Schone Kunsten of Belgium	Brussels
	Portrait of the family Gijsbert Claesz van Campen (fragment; baby in lower left added by Salomon de Bray in 1628)	c. 1620	151 × 163.6 cm	left part of 4732	Toledo Museum of Art	Toledo, OH
	Sitting boy, possible fragment of the portrait of the family Gijsbert Claesz van Campen	1621–1622	52 x 45.7 cm		Private collection	Brussels
	Marriage Portrait of Isaac Massa and Beatrix van der Laen	1622	140 x 166.5 cm	A 133	Rijksmuseum, Amsterdam	Amsterdam
	(Possibly) portrait of Isaac Massa	1622	107 × 85 cm		Devonshire Collection	Chatsworth House
	Young Man and Woman in an Inn ("Yonker Ramp and His Sweetheart")	c.1623	105 x 79 cm		The Metropolitan Museum of Art	New York City, NY
	Portrait of Tieleman Roosterman (the Laughing Cavalier)	1624	83 x 67 cm	84	The Wallace Collection	London
	Boy with flute	1623–1625	62 x 55 cm	801A	Gemäldegalerie	Berlin
	The Lute Player (Hals)	c. 1623–1624	70 x 62 cm	R.F. 1984-32	Musée du Louvre	Paris
	Laughing boy	1625	27.94 cm diameter	AC1992.152.144	Los Angeles County Museum of Art	Los Angeles, CA
	Portrait of Aletta Hanemans (1606–1653)	1625	124.8 x 98.2 cm	460 (pendant to 459)	Mauritshuis	The Hague
	Portrait of Jacob Pietersz Olycan	1625	124.6 x 97.3 cm	459 (pendant to 460)	Mauritshuis	The Hague
	Boy with a glass and a pewter jug	1625–1630	38 cm diameter	G2476	Staatliches Museum Schwerin	Schwerin
	Laughing boy with a flute	1625–1630	37.3 cm diameter	G2475	Staatliches Museum Schwerin	Schwerin
	Boy with a Glass and a Lute	1625–1630	100 x 90 cm		Guildhall Art Gallery	London
	The Smoker, also known as "Three Heads"	1623–1625	46.7 x 49.5 cm	89.15.34	The Metropolitan Museum of Art	New York City, NY
	Boy with a glass and a lute (The Fingernail Test)	1625–1630	72.1 × 59.1 cm	14.40.604	The Metropolitan Museum of Art	New York City, NY
	Portrait of a Bearded Man with a Ruff	1625	76.2 x 63.5 cm	49734	The Metropolitan Museum of Art	New York City, NY
	Young woman (La Bohémienne, formerly known as The Gypsy Girl)	c. 1625	57.8 x 52.1 cm	M.I. 926	Musée du Louvre	Paris
	Portrait of a Man in a Wide-Brimmed Hat	1625–1635	64 × 52 cm	SG 690	Herzogliches Museum	Gotha
	John the evangelist writing	1625–1628	70 x 55 cm	97.PA.48	The J. Paul Getty Museum	Los Angeles, CA
	The evangelist Matthew	1625	70 x 55 cm	180	Odesa Museum of Western and Eastern Art	Odesa
	The evangelist Luke	1625	70 x 55 cm	181	Odesa Museum of Western and Eastern Art	Odesa
	The evangelist Mark	1625–1630	68 × 52 cm		Pushkin Museum	Moscow
	Portrait of Willem van Heythuysen posing with a sword	1625–1630	204.5 x 134.5 cm	14101	Alte Pinakothek	Munich
	Laughing boy	c. 1625	30.45 cm diameter	1032	Mauritshuis	The Hague
	Portrait of Cunera van Baersdorp	1625	116.7 x 91.5 cm		Private collection	England
	Portrait of Michiel de Wael	1625	121 x 95.8 cm	1931.45O	Taft Museum of Art	Cincinnati, OH
	Portrait of a man facing left	1625	26.2 x 20 cm	801F	Staatliche Museen Berlin-Dahlem	Berlin
	Portret van Sara Andriesdr Hessix	1626	87 x 70 cm		Museu Calouste Gulbenkian	Lisbon
	Portrait of Michiel Jansz van Middelhoven (1562–1638)	1610–1626	87 x 70 cm		Collection Adolphe Schloss	unknown
	Portrait of Isaak Abrahamsz. Massa	1626	79.7 × 65.1 cm	54/31	The Art Gallery of Ontario	Toronto, Canada
	Portrait of Anna van der Aar (born 1576/77, died after 1626)	1626	22.2 x 16.5 cm	29.100.9 (pendant to 29.100.8)	The Metropolitan Museum of Art	New York City, NY
	Portrait of Petrus Scriverius	1626	22.2 x 16.5 cm	29.100.8 (pendant to 29.100.9)	The Metropolitan Museum of Art	New York City, NY
	Portrait of Johannes Acronius	1627	19.4 x 17.2 cm	767	Gemäldegalerie	Berlin
	Young Man with a Skull	c. 1626–28	92.2 x 80.8 cm	NG6458	National Gallery	London
	The Banquet of the Officers of the St Adrian Militia Company in 1627	1627	183 × 266.5 cm	OSI-111 (1913)	Frans Hals Museum	Haarlem
	Portrait of an unknown man	c.1627	20 × 14.2 cm	766	Gemäldegalerie	Berlin
	The Banquet of the Officers of the St George Militia Company in 1627	1627	179 × 257.5 cm	OSI-110	Frans Hals Museum	Haarlem
	Portrait of a Woman in a Chair	1627	87 x 67 cm	1954.287	The Art Institute of Chicago	Chicago, IL
	Portrait of a seated young man with a broad brim hat	1626–1929	29.3 × 23.2 cm	1940.1.12	National Gallery of Art	Washington, D.C
	Two laughing boys with mug of beer	1626–1627	68 x 56.5 cm	Br.L.4	Hofje van Mevrouw van Aerden	Leerdam (but missing—stolen)
	Portrait of a man with the jawbone of a cow in his hand (Pieter Verdonck)	c. 1627	46.7 x 35.6 cm	NG1200	National Gallery of Scotland	Edinburgh
	Laughing Fisherboy	1627–1630	82 x 60.2 cm		Schloss Burgsteinfurt	Steinfurt, Westphalia
	Portrait of an unknown woman holding a book	1628	73.7 × 59.1 cm	1957.18.4	Yale University Art Gallery	New Haven, CT
	Laughing man with crock, known as 'Peeckelhaeringh'	c. 1628–1630	75 x 61.5 cm	216	Museum Schloss Wilhelmshöhe	Kassel, DE
	The 'Mulatto'	1628–1630	72 x 57.5 cm	1017	Museum der bildenden Künste	Leipzig
	Girl Singing	about 1628	18.2 × 18.4 cm	L2020.6.14	Frans Hals Museum & Mauritshuis (shared)	Haarlem & The Hague
	Boy playing a violin	about 1628	18.4 × 18.8 cm	os 2025-17 at Frans Hals Museum	Frans Hals Museum & Mauritshuis (shared)	Haarlem & The Hague
	Portrait of (possibly) Johannes Saekma or Theodorus Schrevelius	1628	22.8 cm diameter		Private collection	unknown
	Portrait of (probably) Johannes Saekma	1628	22 x 17.5 cm		Private collection	unknown
	Young woman (by Frans Hals) with a display of fruit and vegetables (by Claes van Heussen)	1630	157 x 200 cm		private collection	London
	The Merry Drinker	1630	81 x 66.5 cm	SK A 135	Rijksmuseum	Amsterdam
	Portrait of Cornelis Coning	1630	106.5 x 81 cm		Allentown Art Museum	Allentown, PA
	Portrait of Samuel Ampzing	1630	16.2 x 12.3 cm		The Leiden Collection	New York City, NY
	Portrait of an unknown man with gloves	1630	116,8 x 90,2 cm	RCIN 405349	Royal Collection	London
	Portrait of Daniel van Aken	1630–1666	67 x 57 cm	NM 1567	National Museum	Stockholm
	Portrait of an unknown woman	1630–1633	75 × 58 cm	801 (pendant of 800)	Gemäldegalerie	Berlin
	Portrait of an unknown man	1630–1633	75 × 58 cm	800 (pendant of 801)	Gemäldegalerie	Berlin
	Portrait of Pieter Jacobsz. Olycan (1572–1658)	1630–1635	68 x 57.6 cm	OS-2004-39	Frans Hals Museum	Haarlem
	Portrait of an old woman in ruff collar and diadem cap	c. 1633	40 x 37.5 cm		Private collection	unknown
	Portrait of a woman with a cartwheel ruff	1630–1640	80 x 64.1 cm		private collection	New York City, NY
	Portrait of a preacher	c.1635	62 x 52 cm	1930.186	Fogg Art Museum	Cambridge, MA
	Drinking woman (Malle Babbe) with an owl on her shoulder	1630–1635	75 x 64 cm	801C	Gemäldegalerie	Berlin
	Smiling Fishergirl	1630–1632	80.6 x 66.7 cm		Private collection	unknown
	Fisher boy with basket	c. 1630	28.3 × 22.8 in	193	National Gallery of Ireland	Dublin
	Fisher boy in a landscape	c. 1630	74 cm x 61 cm	188	Royal Museum of Fine Arts, Antwerp	Antwerp
	Violin playing man in a dune landscape	c. 1630	86.4 x 70 cm	178	Museo Thyssen-Bornemisza	Madrid, Spain
	Portrait of Sara Wolphaerts van Diemen (1593–1667	c. 1630–1633	79.5 × 66.5 cm	SK-A-1247 (pendant to SK A 1246)	Rijksmuseum	Amsterdam
	Portrait of Nicolaes Hasselaer (1593–1635). Brewer, Captain-major of the Amsterdam civic guard	c. 1630–1633	79.5 × 66.5 cm	SK A 1246 (pendant to SK A 1247)	Rijksmuseum	Amsterdam
	Portrait of Cornelia Claesdr Vooght	1631	126.5 x 101 cm	OSI-118 (pendant to OSI-117)	Frans Hals Museum	Haarlem
	Portrait of Nicolaes Woutersz van der Meer	1631	128 x 100.5 cm	OSI-117 (pendant to OSI-118)	Frans Hals Museum	Haarlem
	Portrait of an officer	1631	88 × 66 cm		Museo de Arte de São Paulo	São Paulo
	Portrait of a man with his hand on his heart	1632	62 x 52 cm	Bx E 310; Bx M 7087	Musée des Beaux-Arts de Bordeaux	Bordeaux
	The Officers of the St Adrian Militia Company in 1633	1633	207 x 337 cm	OSI-112	Frans Hals Museum	Haarlem
	Portrait of an unknown man	c.1630–1635	77.7 × 66 cm		Private collection	unknown
	Portrait of a man with a beer jug	c.1630–1635	83 × 66 cm		Private collection	unknown
	Portrait of an unknown man	c.1633	102.9 × 88.9 cm		Tokyo Fuji Art Museum	Tokyo
	Portrait of a man with a pleated collar	1634	68 x 58 cm		Museo Nacional de San Carlos	Mexico City
	Portrait of a man in a Black Jacket	c.1633	24.5 x 20 cm	1359	Gemäldegalerie Alte Meister	Dresden
	Portrait of a man in a Yellowish-gray Jacket	c.1633	24.5 × 19.5 cm	1358	Gemäldegalerie Alte Meister	Dresden
	Portrait of a Man in his Thirties	1633	64.8 x 50.2 cm	cat.1251	National Gallery	London
	Portrait of an Elderly Lady	1633	102.5 × 86.9 cm	1937.1.67	National Gallery of Art	Washington, D.C
	Portrait of Pieter van der Broecke	1633	71.2 x 61 cm	cat.51	Kenwood House	London
	Portrait of Catharina Brugman	1634	115 x 85 cm	(pendant to 1999.173)	private collection	The Hague
	Portrait of Tieleman Roosterman	1634	117 × 87 cm	1999.173	The Cleveland Museum of Art	Cleveland, OH
	Portrait of a young woman aged 28	1634	112.2 x 83.2 cm	51.107	Baltimore Museum of Art	Baltimore, MD
	Portrait of Jan Asselyn	1634	64.5 x 46.3 cm	4158	Szépmüvészeti Múzeum	Budapest
	Portrait of an unknown man	1634	73 x 54 cm		Timken Museum of Art	San Diego, CA
	Portrait of an unknown woman	1634	73.0 x 56.2 cm	23.27	Detroit Institute of Arts	Detroit, MI
	Portrait of a man with hat	c. 1634	24.5 x 19.5 cm	618	Mauritshuis	The Hague
	Portrait of an unknown man	1634	82.5 × 70 cm	4158	Szépmüvészeti Múzeum	Budapest
	Portrait of a family	c.1635	111.8 × 89.9 cm	1927-399	Cincinnati Art Museum	Cincinnati, OH
	Portrait of Feyntje van Steenkiste (....-1640)	1635	123 x 93 cm	SK-C-557 (pendant to SK-C-556)	Rijksmuseum	Amsterdam
	Portrait of Lucas de Clercq (....-1652)	c. 1635	126.5 x 93 cm	SK-C-556 (pendant to SK-C-557)	Rijksmuseum	Amsterdam
	Portrait of a woman, incorrectly called Hylck Boner	1635	116.5 x 93.3 cm	1910.1.72	The Frick Collection	New York City, NY
	Portrait of a man, incorrectly called Johannes Saeckma (1572–1636)	c.1635	121 x 90 cm	1276 (possible pendant of 72)	Museum Boijmans Van Beuningen	Rotterdam
	Portrait of Isaac Massa	1635	20.3 x 18.6 cm	1946–74	San Diego Museum of Art	San Diego, CA
	A young woman with a glass and flagon	c.1635	77.3 x 63.5 cm		private collection; on long term loan to FHM	Haarlem
	The company of Captain Reinier Reael and Lieutenant Cornelis Michielsz. Blaeuw, known as the ‘Meagre Company’	1633–1637	209 x 429 cm	SK C 374	Rijksmuseum	Amsterdam
	Portrait of a Member of the Haarlem Civic Guard	1636–1638	86 × 69 cm	1937.1.68	National Gallery of Art	Washington, D.C
	Portrait of Willem van Heythuysen	1634–1635	47 × 36.7 cm	lot 26 (2008)	private collection	unknown
	Portrait of a man in oval frame	c.1635	94 x 72.4 cm		Woburn Abbey	Bedfordshire
	Portrait of (possibly) Maria Larp ( -1675)	1635–1638	83.4 x 68.1 cm	6413	National Gallery	London
	Portrait of Pieter Tjarck	1635–1638	85.25 x 69.09 cm	M.74.31	Los Angeles County Museum of Art	Los Angeles, CA
	Portrait of a Gentleman in White (re-attributed in 2011)	1637	67.5 × 57 cm	L55.45	California Palace of the Legion of Honor	San Francisco, CA
	Portrait of a woman facing right and holding a fan	1637	67.5 x 57 cm		Staatsgalerie Stuttgart	Stuttgart
	Portrait of a man facing left	1637	67.5 x 57 cm		Stuttgart Staatsgalerie	Stuttgart
	Portrait of a standing woman holding a glove	1637	93 x 67 cm		private collection	unknown
	Portrait of a standing man holding a glove	1637	93 x 67 cm		private collection	unknown
	Portrait of Caspar Sibelius (1590–1658)	1637	26.5 x 22.5 cm		Burned in Billy Rose mansion, Mount Kisco, NY	lost; engraving remains
	Portrait of Aeltje Dircksdr. Pater (1597–1678)	1638	66.5 × 52.3 cm	1948.137	The Cleveland Museum of Art	Cleveland, OH
	Portrait of a man, possibly Johan de Wael (1594–1663)	1638	69.7 x 54 cm	(pendant of 1948.137)	Private collection	Germany
	Portrait of an unknown woman	1638	94.4 × 70.5 cm	78 (pendant of 77)	Städel Museum	Frankfurt am Main
	Portrait of an unknown man	1638	94.4 × 70.5 cm	77 (pendant of 78)	Städel Museum	Frankfurt am Main
	Portrait of an unknown man	c.1638	78.9 x 63.5 cm		Kremer collection	unknown
	Portrait of Claes Duyst van Voorhout	c.1638	80.6 x 66 cm		The Metropolitan Museum of Art	New York City, NY
	Portrait of Maria Pietersdr Olycan	1638	86 × 67 cm	186 P (pendant to 185 P)	São Paulo Museum of Art	São Paulo
	Portrait of Captain Andries van Hoorn	1638	86 × 67 cm	185 P (pendant to 186 P)	São Paulo Museum of Art	São Paulo
	Portrait of an unknown 38-year-old man	1638	89 x 69.8 cm		Nationalmuseum	Stockholm
	Portrait of an unknown 41-year-old woman	1638	89.1 x 70.2 cm		Nationalmuseum	Stockholm
	Portrait of Jean de la Chambre	1638	20.6 x 16.8 cm	6411	National Gallery	London
	Portrait of Maritge Claesdr. Voogt (1572–1644)	1639	128 x 94.5 cm	SK-C-139	Rijksmuseum	Amsterdam
	Portrait of Pieter Jacobsz Olycan	c. 1639	111.1 x 86.7 cm	sn251	The John and Mable Ringling Museum of Art	Sarasota, FL
	Boy Pointing	c.1638	41.5 x 39 cm		private collection	London
	A boy reading, possibly Nicolaes Hals, the son of the painter	c.1638–1640	76 × 63 cm		Collection Oskar Reinhart	Winterthur
	Portrait of a young man	1638–1640	81 × 59 cm	GG_709	Kunsthistorisches Museum	Vienna
	Portrait of a woman, (possibly) Judith van Breda	1639	29.5 x 21 cm	2498 (pendant of 49.347)	Museum Boijmans Van Beuningen	Rotterdam
	Portrait of Hendrik Swalmius ( -1649)	1639	27 x 20 cm	49.347 (pendant of 2498)	Detroit Institute of Arts	Detroit, MI
	The Officers of the St George Militia Company in 1639	1639	218 × 421 cm	OSI-113	Frans Hals Museum	Haarlem
	Portrait of a sitting woman in a painted oval	1639	69.5 x 58 cm		stolen from Kunstmuseum Düsseldorf	unknown
	Portrait of an unknown woman	1640	85.2 × 68.1 cm	1898B	Museum of Fine Arts, Ghent	Ghent
	Portrait of an unknown man	1625–1649	115.5 x 91.5 cm	1910.1.69	The Frick Collection	New York City, NY
	Portrait of an unknown man holding a book	1640s	66 x 48.3 cm		private collection	Paris
	Portrait of an unknown woman, possibly Cornelia van der Meer	c.1640	120 x 94.5 cm	WRM 2530 (pendant of WRM 2529)	Wallraf-Richartz-Museum	Cologne
	Portrait of an unknown man, possibly Albert van Nierop	c.1640	120 x 95 cm	WRM 2529 (pendant of WRM 2530)	Wallraf-Richartz-Museum	Cologne
	portrait of a 52-year-old man with ruff collar holding a hat	1639	115 x 89.5 cm		private collection	unknown
	Portrait of a 56-year-old man, possibly Willem van Warmondt	1640	114 x 99 cm	1038	Collectie Nederland	Amsterdam
	Head of a boy wearing a baret	c. 1640	29.9 cm diameter		private collection	London
	Portrait of a Woman Holding a Fan	c. 1640	79.8 x 59 cm		National Gallery	London
	Regenten of the Grote of St. Elisabeth Gasthuis, Haarlem 1641	1641	153 x 252 cm	OSI-114	Frans Hals Museum	Haarlem
	Portrait of a man facing right	1640–1642	29.5 x 23.5 cm		Staatliche Kunstsammlungen	Kassel, DE
	Portrait of a man facing left	1640–1642	30.5 x 24.5 cm		Staatliche Kunstsammlungen	Kassel, DE
	Portrait of an unknown woman	1640–1642	78 x 65 cm		Pommersches Landesmuseum	Greifswald, DE
	Portrait of a man	1640–1642	79.2 x 65.3 cm		Pommersches Landesmuseum	Greifswald
	Portrait of an unknown woman	1643	82,6 x 67,3 cm	NM6421 (pendant of BF262)	Nationalmuseum Stockholm	Stockholm
	Portrait of a man holding a watch	1643	82.6 x 66.7 cm	BF262 (pendant of NM6421)	Barnes Foundation	Philadelphia, PA
	Portrait of Paulus Verschueren (1606–1667)	1643	118.7 × 94 cm	26.101.11	The Metropolitan Museum of Art	New York City, NY
	Portrait of Mrs. Bodolphe	1643	122.4 × 97.5 cm	1961.18.24 (pendant to 1961.18.23)	Yale University Art Gallery	New Haven, CT
	Portrait of Mr. Bodolphe	1643	122.4 × 97.5 cm	1961.18.23 (pendant to 1961.18.24)	Yale University Art Gallery	New Haven, CT
	Portrait of a man	1643	76 x 66		Private collection	Bielefeld
	Portrait of an elderly man facing right with hat and ruff collar	1643	92.7 x 75 cm		private collection	unknown
	Fragment of a male portrait	1643–1644	39 x 31.5 cm		private collection	unknown
	Portrait of an unknown woman with folded hands	1644–1645	61.4 x 47 cm		National Gallery	London
	Portrait of a standing man holding a glove	1644–1645	88 x 65 cm		private collection	unknown
	Portrait of a 35-year-old woman with a millstone collar	1644	75.9 × 62.5 cm	14/21	Michaelis Collection	Cape Town, S.A.
	Portrait of a man, possibly the doctor Nicolaes Tulp	1644	70 × 55 cm	collectie Six	Six collection	Amsterdam
	Portrait of Conradus Viëtor	1644	82.5 x 66 cm		private collection	New York City, NY
	Portrait of an artist (possibly Harmen Hals)	1644	82.6 x 64.8 cm	94.1023	The Art Institute of Chicago	Chicago, IL
	Portrait of a young man with folded arms	1644	79.5 x 58.4 cm		private collection; on loan to FHM	Haarlem
	Portrait of Dorothea Berck	1644	83.8 × 69.6 cm	1938.231	Baltimore Museum of Art	Baltimore, MD
	Portrait of Joseph Coymans	1644	33 x 27 1/2 in	(pendant to 1938.231)	Wadsworth Atheneum	Hartford, CT
	Portrait of Willem Coymans, a.k.a. Balthasar Coymans	1645	77 × 64 cm	1937.1.69	National Gallery of Art	Washington, D.C
	Portrait of Jasper Schade van Westrum	1645	80 × 67.5 cm	O638	National Gallery in Prague	Prague
	Portrait of a boy with a feathered hat and outstretched hand	1645	75.5 x 63.5 cm		collection Edsel B. Ford, Detroit	Detroit, MI
	Portrait of a man	c.1645	42.4 × 33 cm	15.901	National Gallery of Canada	Ottawa, Canada
	Portrait of Johannes Hoornbeeck	1645	80 x 68 cm	2245	Koninklijke Musea voor Schone Kunsten of Belgium	Brussels
	Portrait of an unknown man	c. 1645	78.5 × 67.3 cm	NG2528	National Gallery	London
	A Dutch Lady	1643–1645	115 x 85.8 cm	NG692 (pendant of NG691)	National Gallery of Scotland	Edinburgh
	A Dutch Gentleman	1643–1645	115 x 86.1 cm	NG691 (pendant of NG692)	National Gallery of Scotland	Edinburgh
	Portrait of a man, possibly Adriaen Jansz. van Ostade (1610–1685)	1645–1648	94 × 75 cm	1937-1-70	National Gallery of Art	Washington, D.C
	Family group in landscape	1645–1648	202 x 285 cm	179 (1934.8)	Museo Thyssen-Bornemisza	Madrid, Spain
	Portrait of a family	c. 1645–1650	148.5 x 251 cm	2285	National Gallery	London
	Portrait of a man leaning over the back of a chair with a black hat	1646–1648	68 x 56 cm	1937.1.71	National Gallery of Art	Washington, D.C
	Portrait of an unknown woman	1648–1650	108 × 80 cm	MI 927	Musée du Louvre	Paris
	Portrait of an unknown man	1648–1650	63.5 x 53.5 cm	1942.9.28	National Gallery of Art	Washington, D.C
	Portrait of the French philosopher and mathematician René Descartes (1596–1650)	1649	19 x 14 cm	DEP7	Statens Museum for Kunst	Copenhagen
	Portrait of a seated Woman Holding a Fan	1648–1650	109.5 x 82.5 cm	1931.455 (pendant of 1931.451)	Taft Museum of Art	Cincinnati, OH
	Portrait of a Seated Man Holding a Hat	1648–1650	109.8 x 82.5 cm	1931.451 (pendant of 1931.455)	Taft Museum of Art	Cincinnati, OH
	Portrait of Nicolaas Stenius (1605–1670)	1650	100 x 75.5 cm	BMH s662	Museum Catharijneconvent	Utrecht
	Portret van Adrianus Tegularius	1650–1654	27.9 x 22.8 cm		private collection	unknown
	Portrait of a Man	1650	104 x 90 cm		Nelson-Atkins Museum	Kansas City, MO
	Portrait of an unknown woman	1648–1650	35 x 29 cm		Aurora Art Fund	Bucharest
	Portrait of a woman	1650	84.6 x 69.2 cm	51.3	Museum of Fine Arts, Houston	Houston, TX
	Portrait of Isabella Coymans ( -1689)	1648–1650	116 × 86 cm	(pendant to 674)	Private collection	France
	Portrait of Stephanus Geeraerdts ( -1671)	1648–1650	115.4 × 87.5 cm	674	Royal Museum of Fine Arts, Antwerp	Antwerp
	Portrait of an unknown woman	1650–1652	100.3 × 81.3 cm	9092	Kunsthistorisches Museum	Vienna
	Portrait of an unknown woman	1650–1652	102.6 × 88.9 cm	272:1955	Saint Louis Art Museum	Saint Louis, MO
	Portrait of an unknown man	1650–1652	108 × 80 cm	lot 37A	Liechtenstein Museum	Vienna
	Portrait of an unknown man	after 1650	113 × 81.9 cm	1917.1.70	The Frick Collection	New York City, NY
	Portrait of a woman	after 1650	100 x 81.9 cm	91.26.10 (pendant to 1906.1.71)	The Metropolitan Museum of Art	New York City, NY
	Portrait of a man	after 1650	100.3 x 82.9 cm	1906.1.71 (pendant to 912610)	The Frick Collection	New York City, NY
	Portrait of a Young Man Holding a Glove	c. 1650	80 x 66.5 cm	982	Hermitage Museum	St. Petersburg (Russia)
	Portrait of an unknown man	1650–1652	110.5 x 86.3 cm	91.26.9	The Metropolitan Museum of Art	New York City, NY
	Portrait of a man facing forward	1650–1652	65 x 56.5 cm		Private collection	unknown
	Portrait of a man with long hair and a mustache	1650–1652	84.7 x 67 cm	816	Hermitage Museum	St. Petersburg (Russia)
	Portrait of Willem van Heythuysen (copy 20 years later by the artist)	1653	46.5 x 37.5 cm	2247	Koninklijke Musea voor Schone Kunsten of Belgium	Brussels
	Portrait of an unknown man	1658–1660	35.5 x 29.5 cm		Yale University Art Gallery	New Haven, CT
	Portrait of Tyman Oosdorp	c. 1656	89 x 70 cm	801H	Gemäldegalerie	Berlin
	Portrait of Vincent Laurensz van der Vinne	1655	64.8 x 49 cm		The Art Gallery of Ontario	Toronto, Canada
	Portrait of a Young Woman	1655–1660	60 x 55.6 cm	KINCM:2005.5003	Ferens Art Gallery	Hull
	The Traveller	1655–1660	35 x 26 cm		Heinz Kuckei Collection	Berlin
	Portrait of a young man	1650–1655	67.3 x 50.8 cm	M.1972.4.P	Norton Simon Museum	Pasadena, CA
	Portrait of (possibly) John Livingston (1603–1672)	1650–1655	58.4 x 47 cm		Private collection	unknown
	Portrait of an unknown man	1650–1652	115 x 84.5 cm	1942.9.29	National Gallery of Art	Washington, D.C
	Portrait of Frans Jansz Post (1612–1680)	c. 1655	27.5 × 23 cm		Worcester Art Museum	Worcester, MA
	Portrait of a Man	1655–1660	104 x 84.5	KMS3847	Statens Museum for Kunst	Copenhagen
	Portrait of a Man	1655–1660	77.47 cm x 64.77 cm	68.101	Memorial Art Gallery	Rochester, NY
	Portrait of an unknown woman	1655–1660	65 × 45 cm		Museo Thyssen-Bornemisza	Madrid, Spain
	Portrait of an unknown man	1655–1660	65 × 45 cm		Museo Thyssen-Bornemisza	Madrid, Spain
	Portrait of a man	c. 1660	31.6 x 25.5 cm	928	Mauritshuis	The Hague
	Portrait of a man, possibly a minister	1660	37 x 29.8 cm	SK A 2859	Rijksmuseum	Amsterdam
	Portrait of Herman Langelius	c.1660	76 x 63.5 cm		Musée de Picardie	Amiens
	Portrait of an unknown woman	1660–1666	44.5 x 34.3 cm	PO589	Christ Church Picture Gallery	Oxford, England
	Portrait of a man in a gray cloak with wide brim hat perched at an angle on his head	1660–1663	80 × 67 cm	150	Fitzwilliam Museum	Cambridge
	Portrait of an unknown woman with gloves	1645–1650	102.3 x 81.3 cm		private collection, on loan to Frans Hals museum	Haarlem
	Portrait of Isaac Massa with a large floppy hat	1661–1663	79.5 × 66.5 cm	219	Museum Schloss Wilhelmshöhe	Kassel, DE
	Portrait of Willem Croes (d.1666)	1662–1666	47.1 × 34.4 cm	8402	Alte Pinakothek	Munich
	Portrait of a Seated Man	1660–1666	69 x 60.5 cm		Musée Jacquemart-André	Paris
	Portrait of a scholar holding a book facing left	c.1660	36.5 x 29.9 cm		Private collection	unknown
	Portrait of Cornelis Guldewagen (1599–1663)	1660–1663	40 x 30.5 cm		Krannert Art Museum	Urbana, IL
	Portrait of an unknown man	1660–1666	85.8 x 66.9 cm	66.1054	Museum of Fine Arts	Boston, MA
	Portrait of a man with a tassle collar	1660–1666	70 x 58.5 cm		Kunsthaus Zurich	Zurich
	Group portrait of the Regents of the Old Men's Almshouse	1664	172.5 x 256 cm	OSI-115	Frans Hals Museum	Haarlem
	Group portrait of the Regentesses of the Old Men's Almshouse	1664	170.5 x 249.5 cm	OSI-116	Frans Hals Museum	Haarlem

== See also ==
- Marriage pendant portraits by Frans Hals – a subset of this list showing the marriage pendants side-by-side
- Frans Hals catalogue raisonné, 1974 – the list of 222 paintings attributed as autograph by Seymour Slive in 1974
- Frans Hals catalogue raisonné, 1989 – the list of 145 paintings attributed as autograph by Claus Grimm in 1989

== Sources ==
- Frans Hals, by Seymour Slive, a catalogue raisonné of Hals works by Seymour Slive: Volume Three, the catalogue, National gallery of Art: Kress Foundation, Studies in the History of European Art, London – Phaidon Press, 1974
- Frans Hals, by Seymour Slive (editor), with contributions by Pieter Biesboer, Martin Bijl, Karin Groen and Ella Hendriks, Michael Hoyle, Frances S. Jowell, Koos Levy-van Halm and Liesbeth Abraham, Bianca M. Du Mortier, Irene van Thiel-Stroman, Prestel-Verlag, Munich & Mercatorfonds, Antwerp, 1989, ISBN 3791310321
- Frans Hals: het gehele oeuvre, by Claus Grimm, Amsterdam, Meulenhoff/Landshoff, 1990
- Exhibition on the Occasion of the Centenary of the Municipal Museum at Haarlem, 1862–1962, catalogue of the Frans Hals Museum, 1962
- Exhibition on the Occasion of the 75th birthday of the Municipal Museum at Haarlem in 1937, catalogue of the Frans Hals Museum, 1937
- Frans Hals in the RKD
