= Portrait of a Woman in a Chair =

Painting by Frans Hals

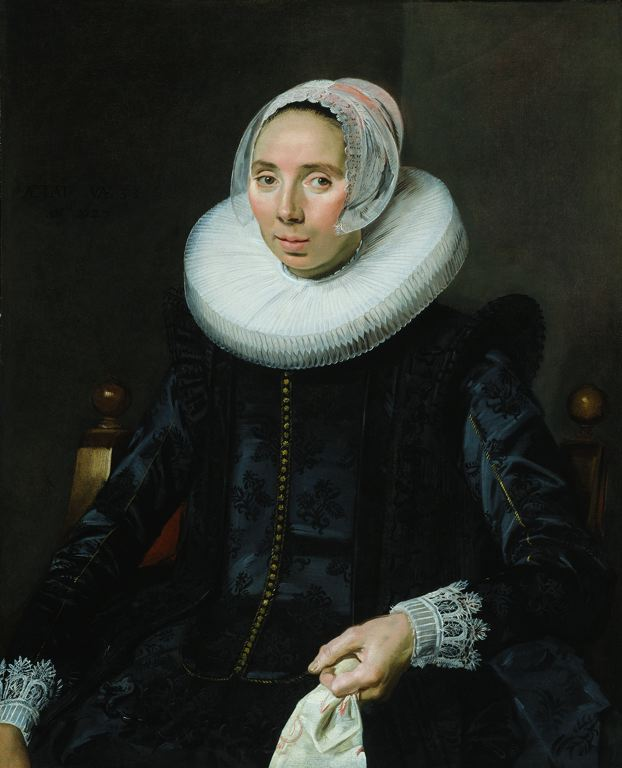
- Portrait of a Woman in a Chair, c. 1627, oil on panel, 87 x 67 cm
- Artist: Frans Hals
- Year: 1627
- Catalogue: Seymour Slive, Catalog 1974: #52
- Medium: Oil on canvas
- Dimensions: 87 cm × 67 cm (34 in × 26 in)
- Location: Art Institute of Chicago; Chicago
- Accession: 1954.287
- Website: www.artic.edu/aic/collections/artwork/105945

Portrait of a Woman in a Chair is an oil-on-canvas painting by the Dutch Golden Age painter Frans Hals, painted in 1627 and now in the Art Institute of Chicago. It is considered a pendant portrait, but the sitter is unknown and therefore the pendant is not certain.

== Painting ==
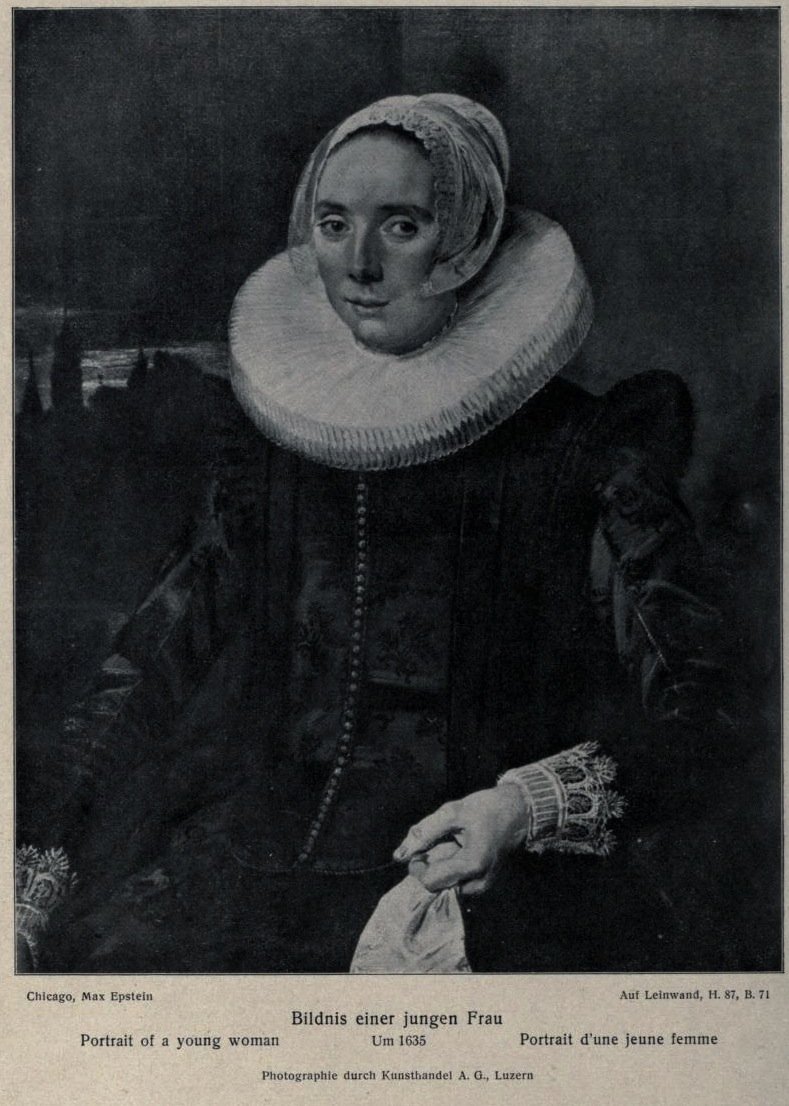
Portrait as it appeared in Valentiner in 1923 with a cityscape visible on the left

This painting of a young woman with a diadem cap and dark bodice with gold buttons holding a glove or handkerchief, was first documented by W.R. Valentiner in 1923. He mentioned it as being in the Chicago collection of Max Epstein (1875–1954) and dated it to 1635. In 1974 Seymour Slive listed the painting as catalog number 52 and mentioned that after cleaning, the rosy landscape on the left hand side was removed to reveal the back of a chair and the inscription "aeta suae 33 Ano 1627", leading him to conclude the woman was aged 33 at marriage and dating the portrait seven years earlier than Valentiner's original estimate. Slive felt the painting showed similarities (lace cuffs and flesh tones) with Hals' portrait of Aletta Hannemans, but it had been cropped on all sides. He based his conclusion on the idea that Hals would not have allowed a woman's hand to be cropped at the painting's edge as seen in this portrait. In 1989 Claus Grimm listed it again as by Hals, catalog number 35.

== Possible pendants ==
A possible pendant of this painting (slightly larger, if this one was indeed cut down)

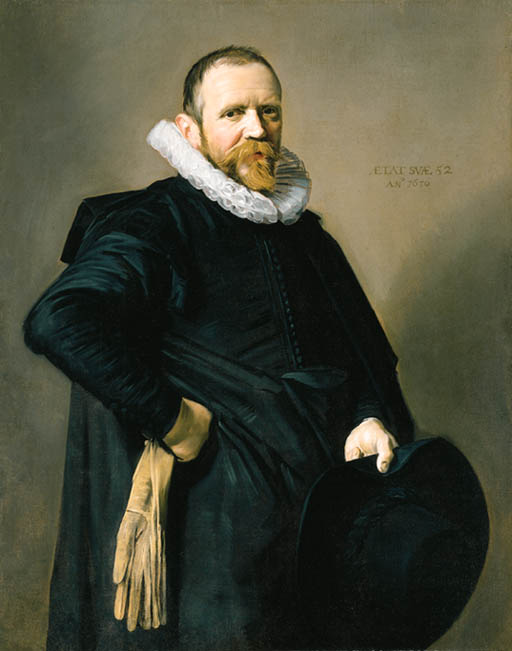

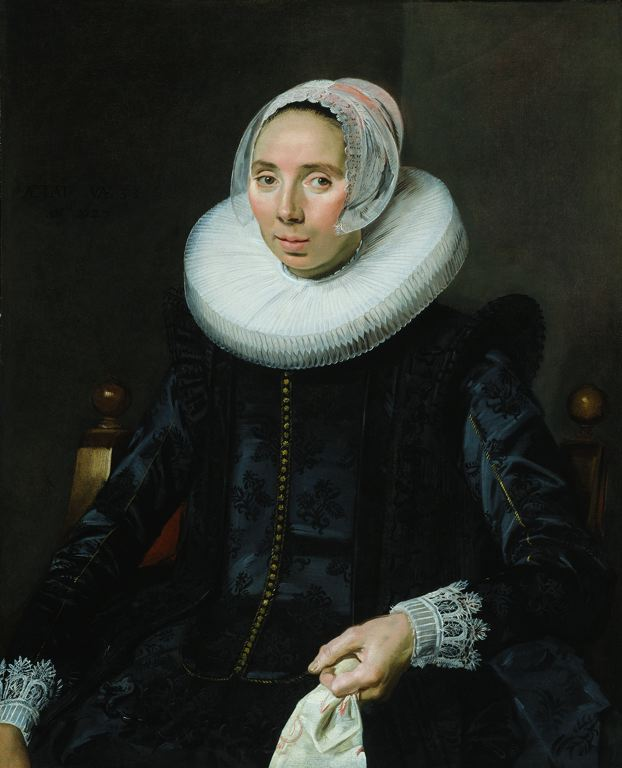

Another possible pendant of this painting (slightly smaller, if both were cut down)

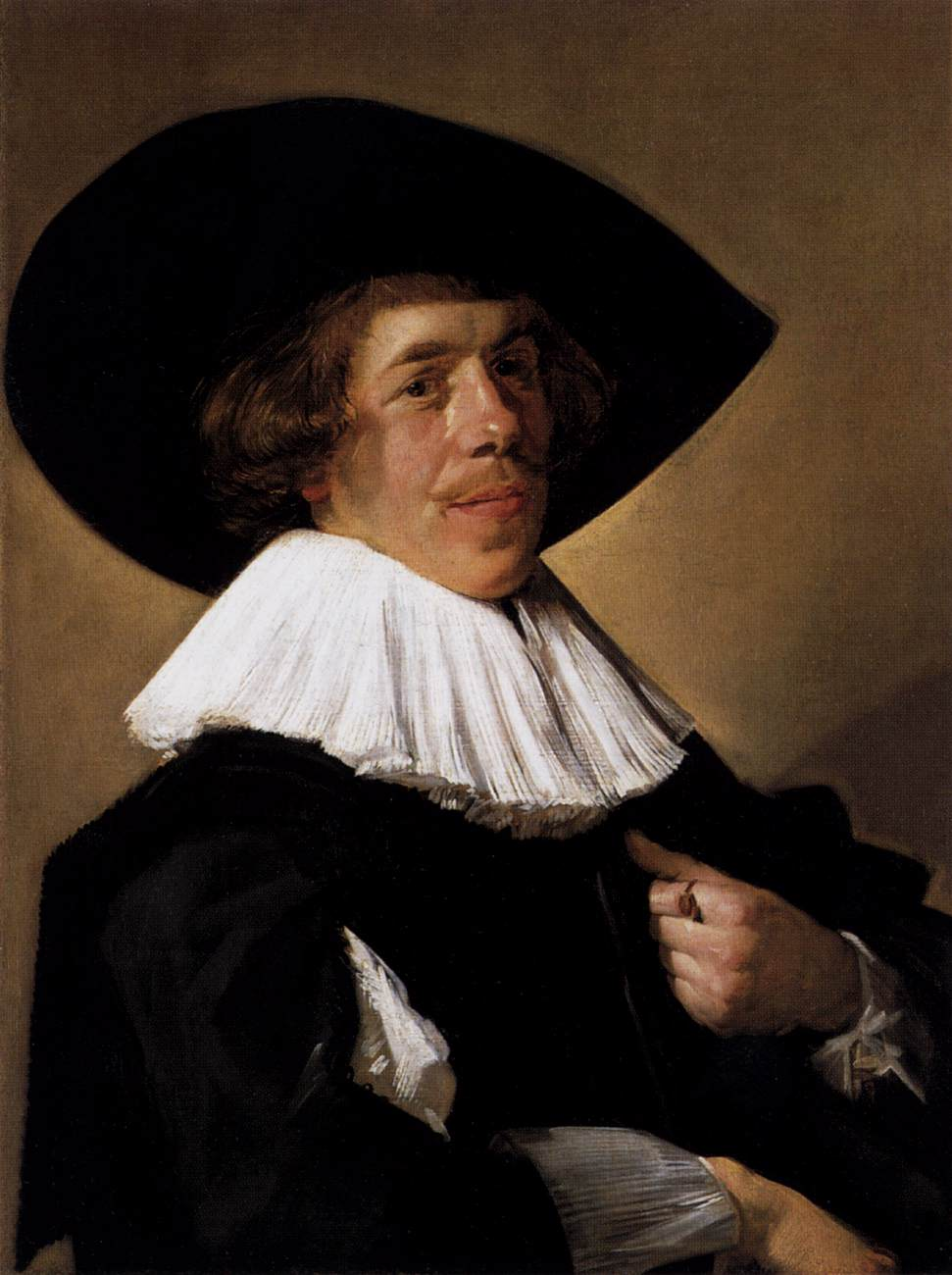

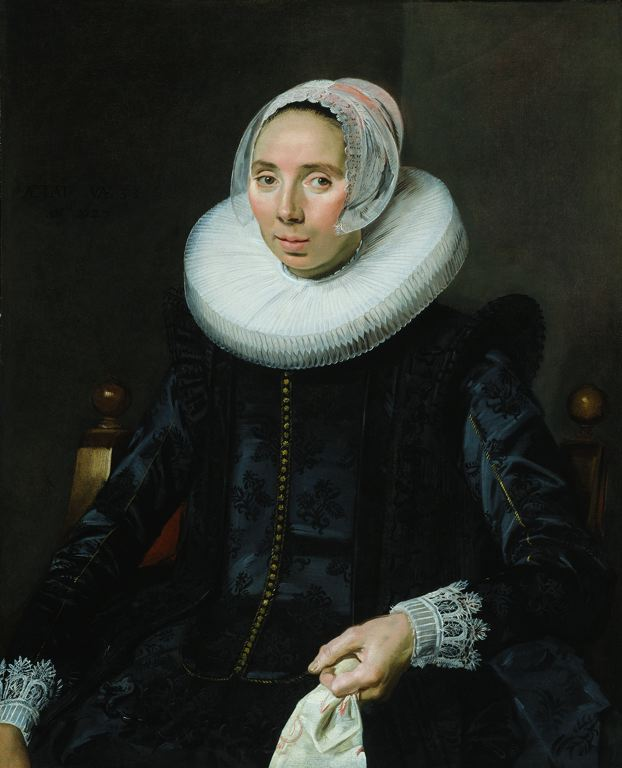

== See also ==
- List of paintings by Frans Hals
