= Portrait of a Man (Frans Hals, Musée Jacquemart-André) =

Painting by Frans Hals

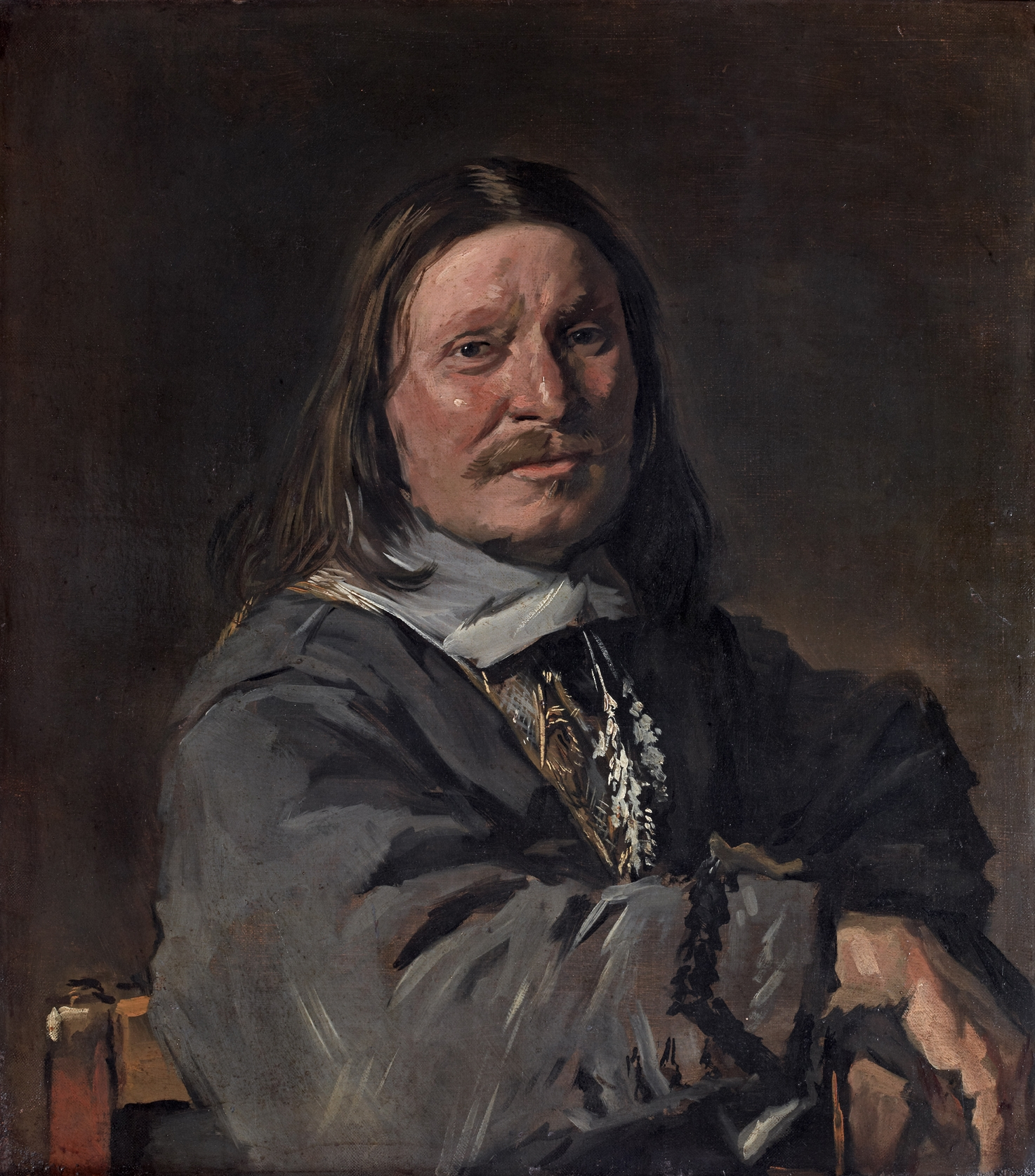

Portrait of a Man is a c.1660 oil-on-canvas portrait of an unknown subject by the Dutch artist Frans Hals, produced late in his career. Acquired by Édouard André, it is now in the Musée Jacquemart-André in Paris.

== See also ==
- List of paintings by Frans Hals
