= Man with a Beer Jug =

Painting by Frans Hals

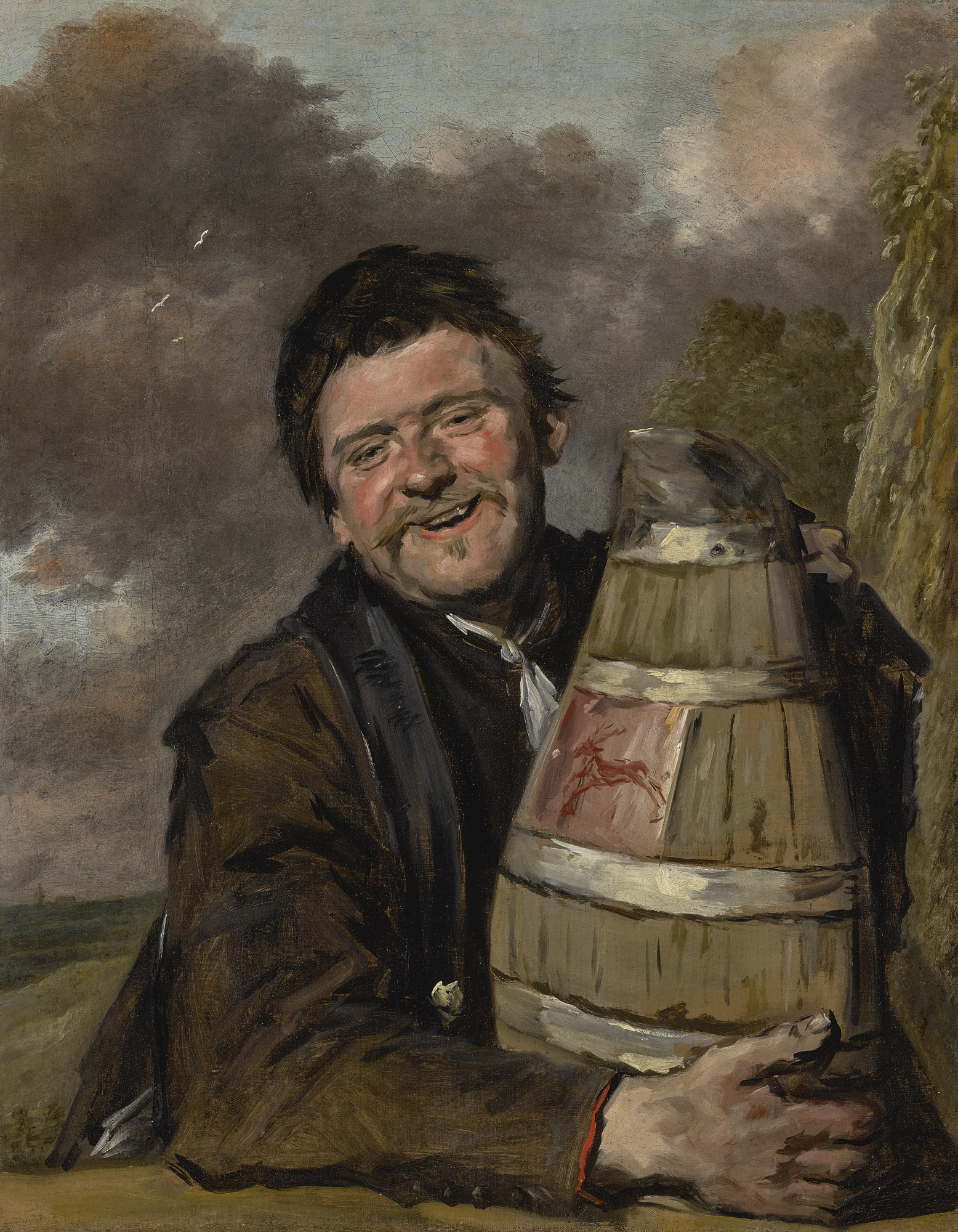
- Man with a Beer Jug, c.1630, oil on canvas, 83 cm x 66 cm
- Artist: Frans Hals
- Year: c. 1630
- Catalogue: Seymour Slive, Catalog 1974: #74
- Medium: Oil on canvas
- Dimensions: 83 cm × 66 cm (33 in × 26 in)
- Location: Private collection

Man with a Beer Jug is an oil-on-canvas painting by the Dutch Golden Age painter Frans Hals, painted in the early 1630s, now in a private collection.

== Painting ==
This painting was documented by Seymour Slive in 1974, who claimed that it was in the collection of Henry Reichhold in White Plains, New York. The figure of a red deer on the front of the beer jug corresponds with the house name "Het Rode Hert" of the Haarlem beer brewer Cornelis Guldewagen, whose portrait was painted by Hals in 1660. Though the genre of the work is similar to works painted by Hals in the early thirties, the rough brush strokes are more similar to his work in the sixties. Possibly, the man with the jug and Guldewagen himself are the same:

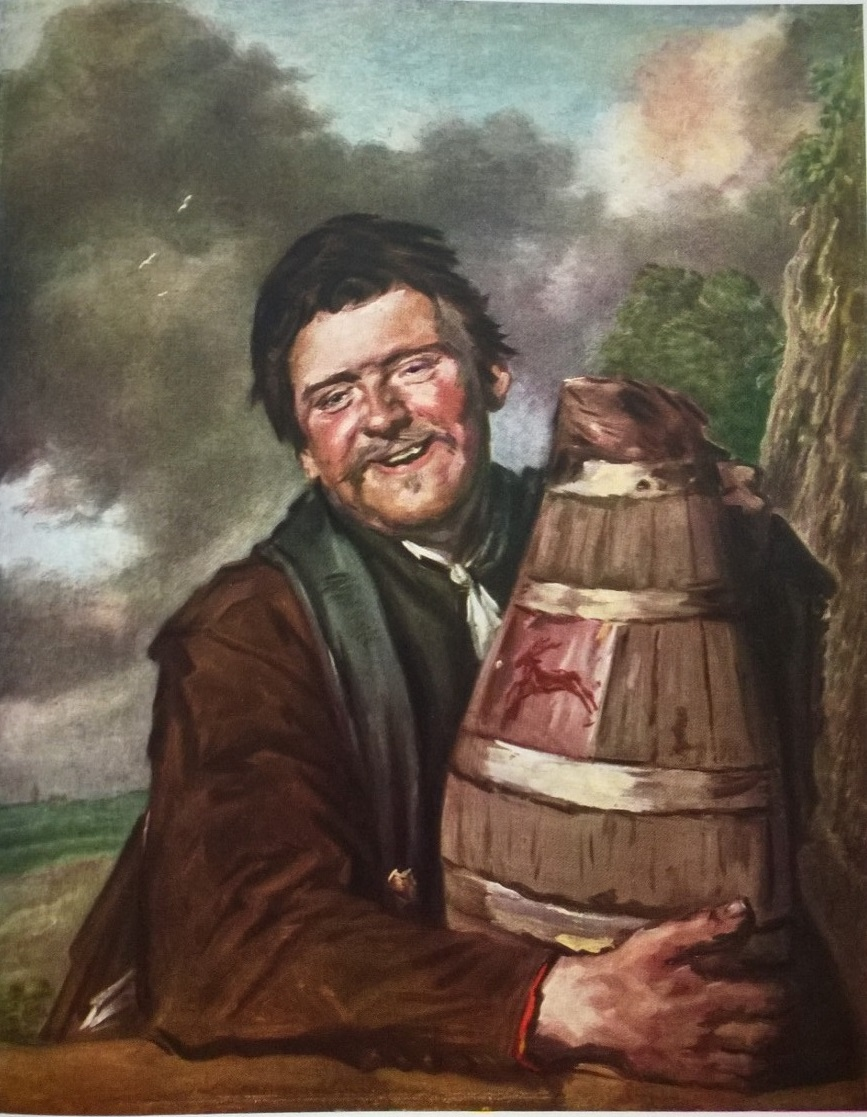

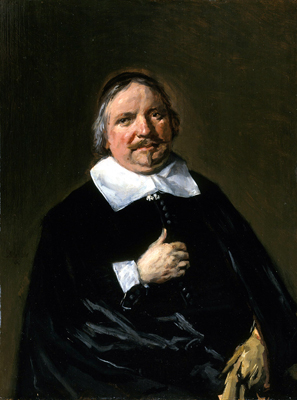

In an old genre painting of Haarlem from the 1650s, a man is transporting beer jugs with a horse-drawn sled. The jugs have a red deer on them, the symbol of Guldewagen's brewery:

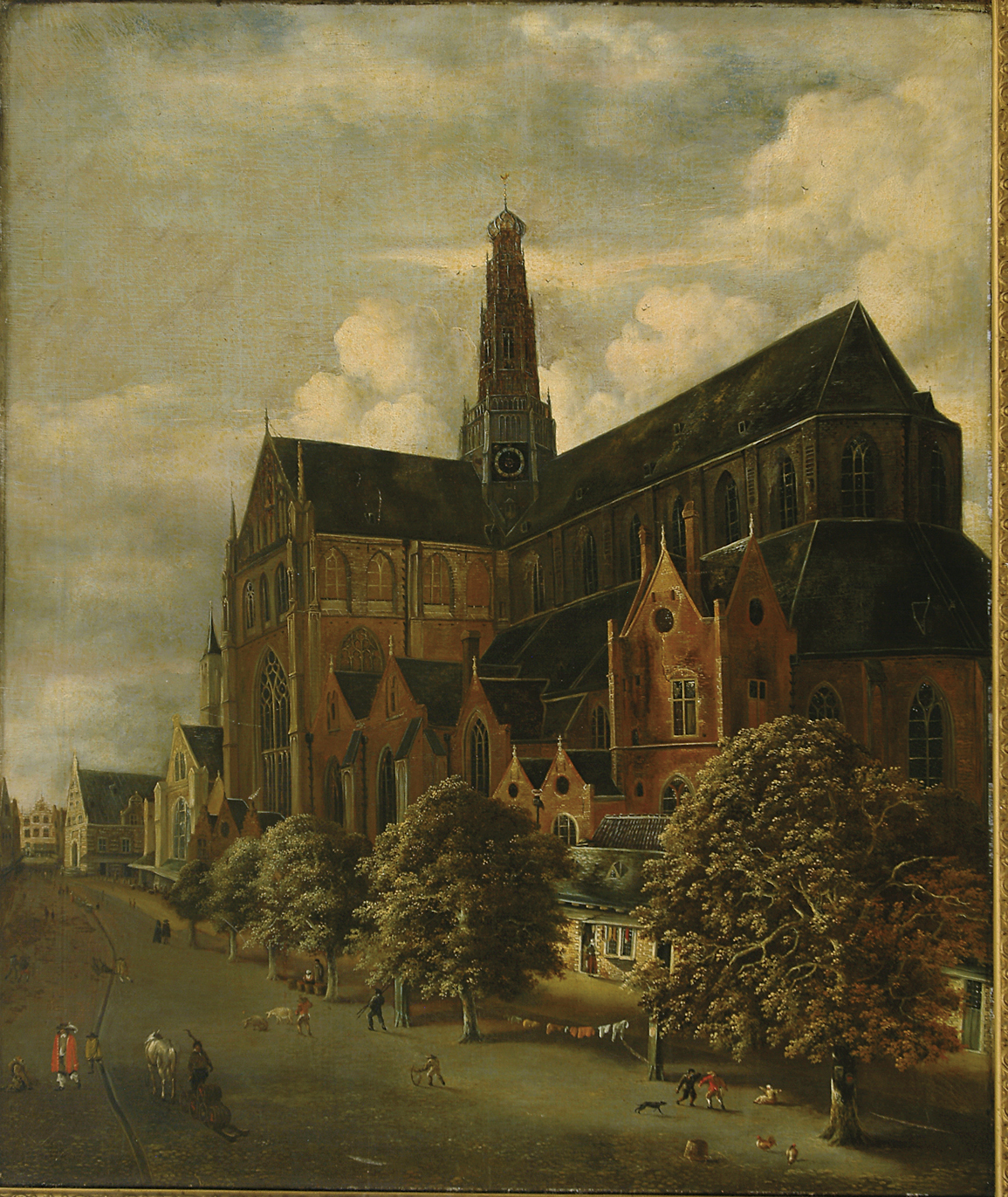
St. Bavochurch from the Southeast, by Jan Wouwerman

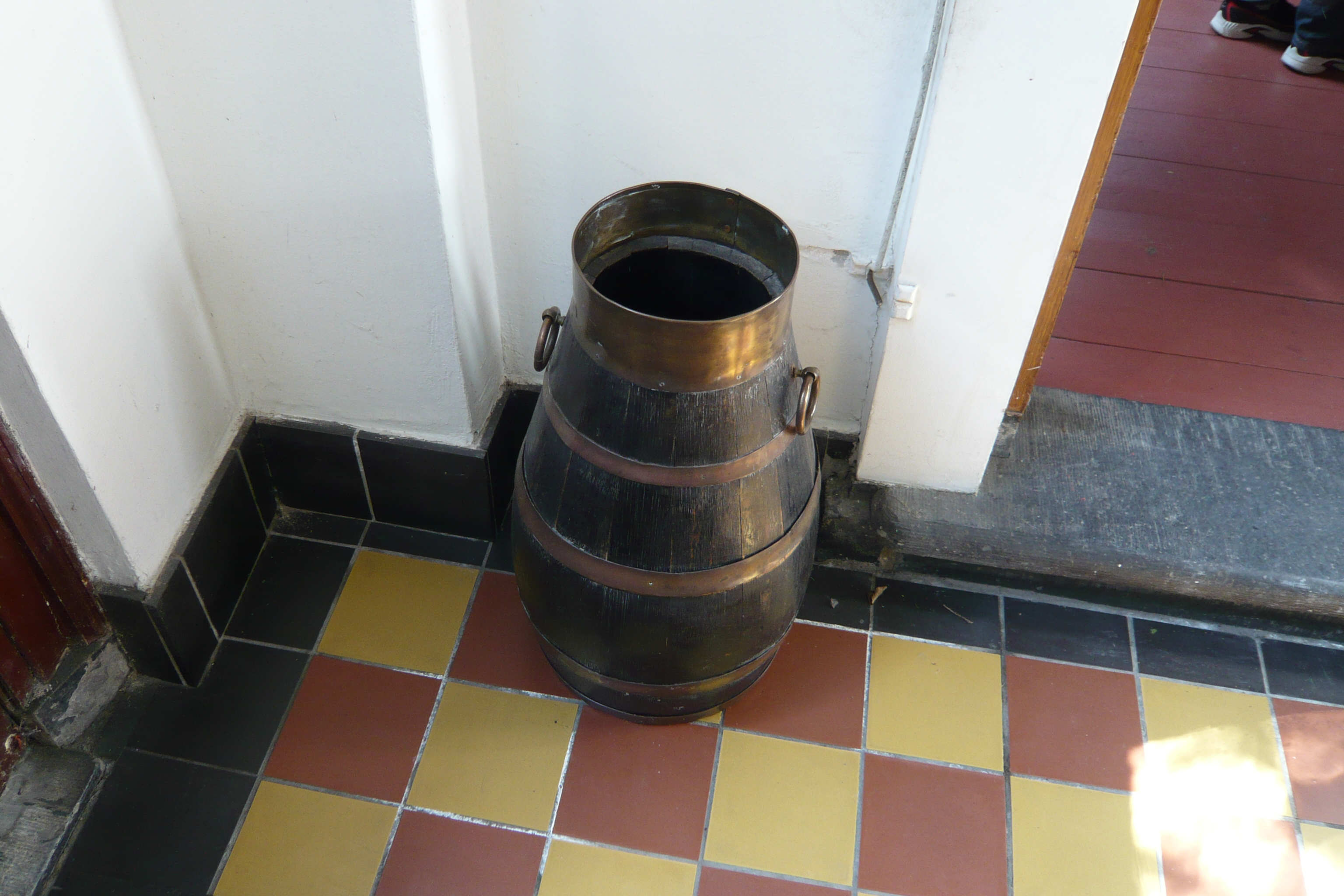
Old Haarlem beer jug in the Zuiderhofje

== See also ==
- List of paintings by Frans Hals
