= The Merry Drinker =

Painting by Frans Hals

- De vrolijke drinker (Dutch)
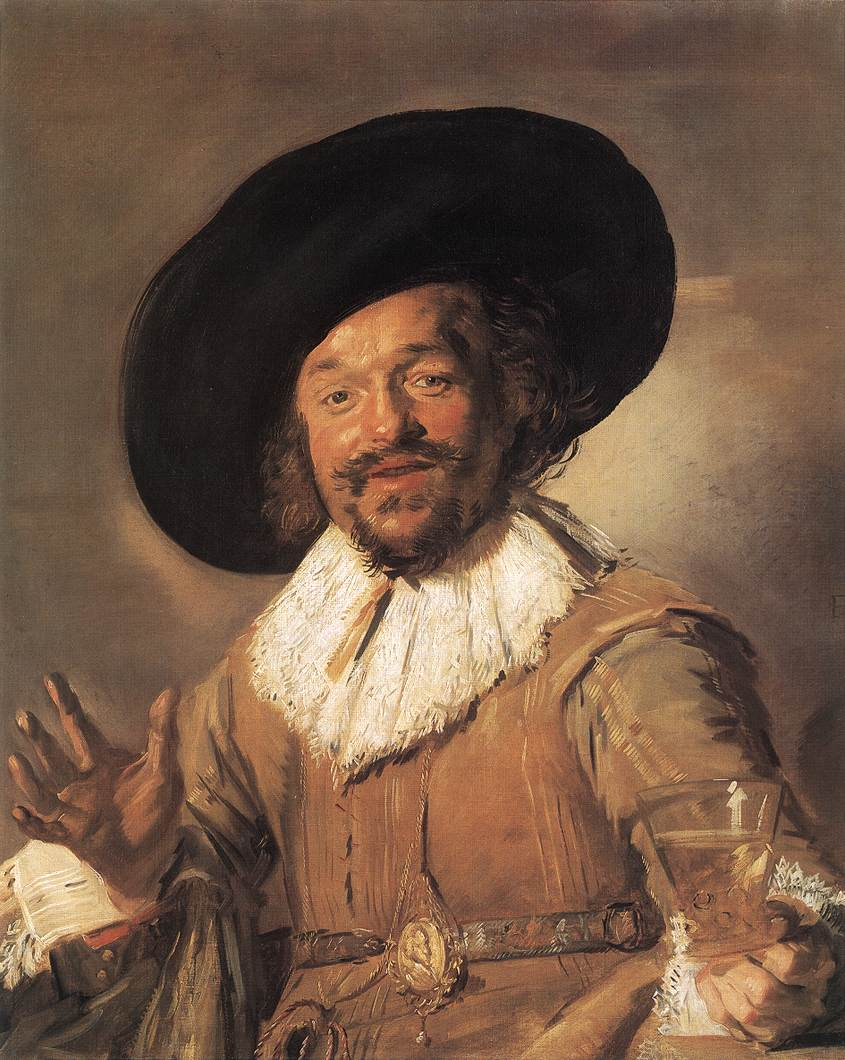
- Artist: Frans Hals
- Year: c. 1628–1630
- Medium: oil on canvas
- Dimensions: 81 cm × 66.5 cm (32 in × 26.2 in)
- Location: Rijksmuseum, Amsterdam

The Merry Drinker is an oil-on-canvas painting by Dutch artist Frans Hals, from c. 1628–1630. The painting has dimensions of 81 by 66.5 centimeters. It is in the collection of the Rijksmuseum, in Amsterdam.

Hals's unique painting style is a result of layering the paint and employing loose brushstrokes. It has been difficult to classify the painting and there has been much discussion about whether it is a genre piece or a portrait. It is one of the Rijksmuseum's most popular pieces due to its originality and candor, reflecting the energy of the Dutch Golden Age.

== Analysis ==
The painting shows a man wearing a leather jerkin, lace collar and cuffs, and a floppy hat tipped at an angle. He is gesturing with his right hand and holding a glass of white wine in his left hand. He seems caught in a moment of discussion with the viewer.

== Style ==
The casual expression on his face and the painting’s in-the-moment feel is reminiscent of (and a precursor to) impressionism. The hatching is a unique feature of the painting, and one that Hals employs sparingly. He also used the end of his paintbrush to create forms in the wet paint. Hals worked quickly but did work in layers with his paint. This meant that he had to wait for one layer to dry before putting another on top. He would first use a layer of light paint to prime his canvas. These base layers, or grounds, could be white, ochre, brown, or gray. This created more intricate shades of color than a plain white base would. His paint strokes are irregular, going from thin to thick with circular forms and quick slashes that are more noticeable and give a sense of movement.

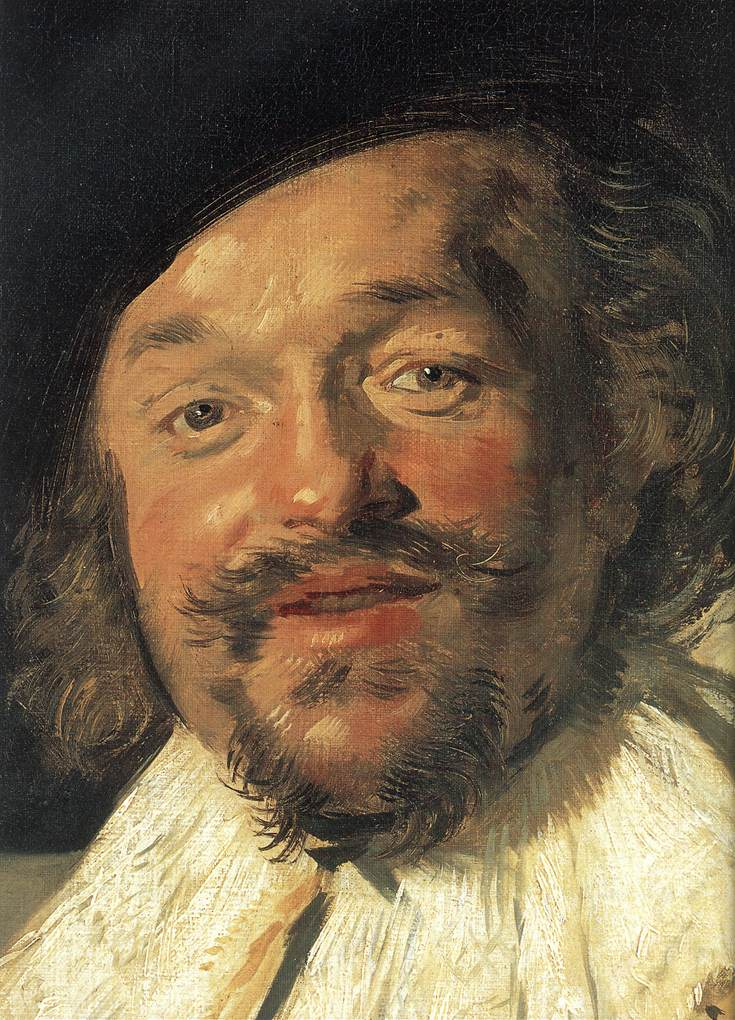
Detail of paint strokes and build-up of base layers. Frans Hals - The Merry Drinker (detail) - WGA11096

Hals preferred to use affordable materials that were easily acquired rather than harder-to-find and more expensive materials like lapis lazuli and gold leaf. He was more focused on how his paintings looked and less on what he used to compose them. Most of his genre and portrait paintings are done in front of plain backgrounds with no other elements (trees, flowers, fruit, etc.), are moderately sized, and rarely depict a full-length figure.

== Subject ==
Although it is often referred to as a genre piece, the painting is difficult to classify. There has been art historical debate over whether this is a portrait or a genre scene. In old Dutch inventories, the theme of a "merry drinker" or "jolly toper" occurs often, and this was probably not a portrait but meant as a genre piece. The classification of the painting as a genre piece comes from Dutch art collector and historian Cornelis Hofstede de Groot, who updated John Smith's catalog raisonné in 1910. British art historians Hugh Honour and John Fleming have claimed that the painting is an allegory of taste highlighting drinking as an enjoyment. It has even been suggested that the painting could be a portrait of a Haarlem innkeeper named Hendrick den Abt who owned a few of Hals’s works. The medal worn in the painting could point to the merry drinker's identity, but this is challenging to determine due to the impressionistic style in which Hals painted him. Hofstede de Groot claimed the medallion bears a likeness of Maurice, Prince of Orange. Since polite society required one's laughter be concealed in public, portraits showing laughter and teeth during this time are seldom seen, thus it can be argued that since the figure’s teeth can be seen in The Merry Drinker that this is a genre painting and not a portrait.

== Historical context ==
The painting was completed roughly twenty years before the end of the Eighty Years’ War (or the Dutch Revolt), and Dutch independence was reflected more and more in art. The medallion the drinker wears is thought to be Maurice, Prince of Orange, who organized the Dutch rebellion against Spain and gained admiration amongst the Dutch for his successful military strategies. The rebellion brought not only religious toleration but the development of an open art market that was driven by the rapidly growing middle class, trade, and ultimately formed the Dutch Golden Age. Protestantism and Calvinism overtook Catholicism in the Dutch North, which meant that instead of Catholic patrons commissioning art for their cathedrals, private citizens were now acquiring art for their homes to show off their new wealth. Specific sub-genres of painting, one of which was tavern scenes like The Merry Drinker, began to appear, and portraits too became very popular; Hals painted many. Paintings like these demonstrate a break from the religious and political themes of the Catholic church and reflect the freedom of Dutch independence.

Hals was not particularly symbolistic in his paintings, but The Merry Drinker does show some figurative representations. The Merry Drinker was well liked for its seemingly impulsive setting and straightforwardness. It reflected an energy in the newly formed Dutch Republic and was in turn a reflection of a new Dutch culture: “individuality, independence, naturalness, honestly and ebullience.” It is emblematic of the Netherlands as a free state. The enthusiasm and pleasure of Hals’s Merry Drinker reveal the vigor and excitement of the newly formed independent Dutch Republic. The drinker’s fine clothes show his status and set him apart from other jolly toper paintings of the period. The golden colors that make up his clothing are a reference to the Dutch Golden Age. Typical of Hals’ paintings around this time, The Merry Drinker looks directly at viewers as if he is in conversation with them.

A painting of merry folk like Hals’s was a reflection of real life. Paintings like these aided in making casual scenes and portraits desirable and could bring out a similar reaction in those viewing one. Dutch people were turning their attention away from serious paintings and developing a preference for more playful ones. Instead of depicting drinking as a moral warning, Hals shows the pleasures associated with it, as was popular in other forms of art in the Dutch Golden Age like Gerbrand Bredero's poems and satires. Paintings like The Merry Drinker both responded to and were influenced by the public’s taste in the art of the day.

== Impact ==
The earliest known writing on the painting was made by Lord Dover in 1822, an Englishman visiting the newly established Rijksmuseum. In his catalogue, Dover referred to Hals's painting style as "unfinished" but admired the expression of The Merry Drinker's face. In 1868 French journalist and art critic Théophile Thoré-Bürger renewed public interest in Hals after writing that the seemingly "unfinished" brushstrokes were actually deliberate, and the painting's position rapidly changed. These nineteenth-century admirers of Hals’s work saw in it a slice of life that was original and exciting. The Merry Drinker remains one of the Rijksmuseum’s most visited paintings.

== Provenance ==
The painting was purchased by the Rijksmuseum in 1816 from Baroness Hermina Jacoba van Leyden van Warmond, née Comtesse de Thoms (1790-1814).

It is also referred to as A Militiaman Holding a Berkemeyer and A Civic Guardsman Holding a Berkemeier.

The painting was restored in 1971 in order to remove discolored varnish. After the restoration was completed, restorers found a greater distinction between the seemingly monochromatic colors. The grey background now stands out even more against the flushed skin and golden clothing of the drinker, as Hals originally intended.

== See also ==
- List of paintings by Frans Hals

== Sources ==
- Frans Hals, a catalogue raisonné of Hals works by Seymour Slive: Volume Three, the catalogue, National gallery of Art: Kress Foundation, Studies in the History of European Art, London - Phaidon Press, 1974
- Jowell, Frances Suzman. “Thoré-Bürger and the Revival of Frans Hals.” The Art Bulletin 56, no. 1 (1974): 101–17.
- Schiller, Noel G. "The Art of Laughter: Society, Civility and Viewing Practices in the Netherlands, 1600–1640." Order No. 3224739, University of Michigan, 2006.
- Atkins, Christopher D.M. “THE HALS BRAND.” In The Signature Style of Frans Hals: Painting, Subjectivity, and the Market in Early Modernity, 159–92. Amsterdam University Press, 2012.
- Atkins, Christopher D.M. “A LIVELINESS UNIQUELY HIS.” In The Signature Style of Frans Hals: Painting, Subjectivity, and the Market in Early Modernity, 23–84. Amsterdam University Press, 2012.
- Slive, Seymour. Frans Hals. London: Phaidon, 1970.
