= Laughing Boy with a Flute =

Painting by Frans Hals

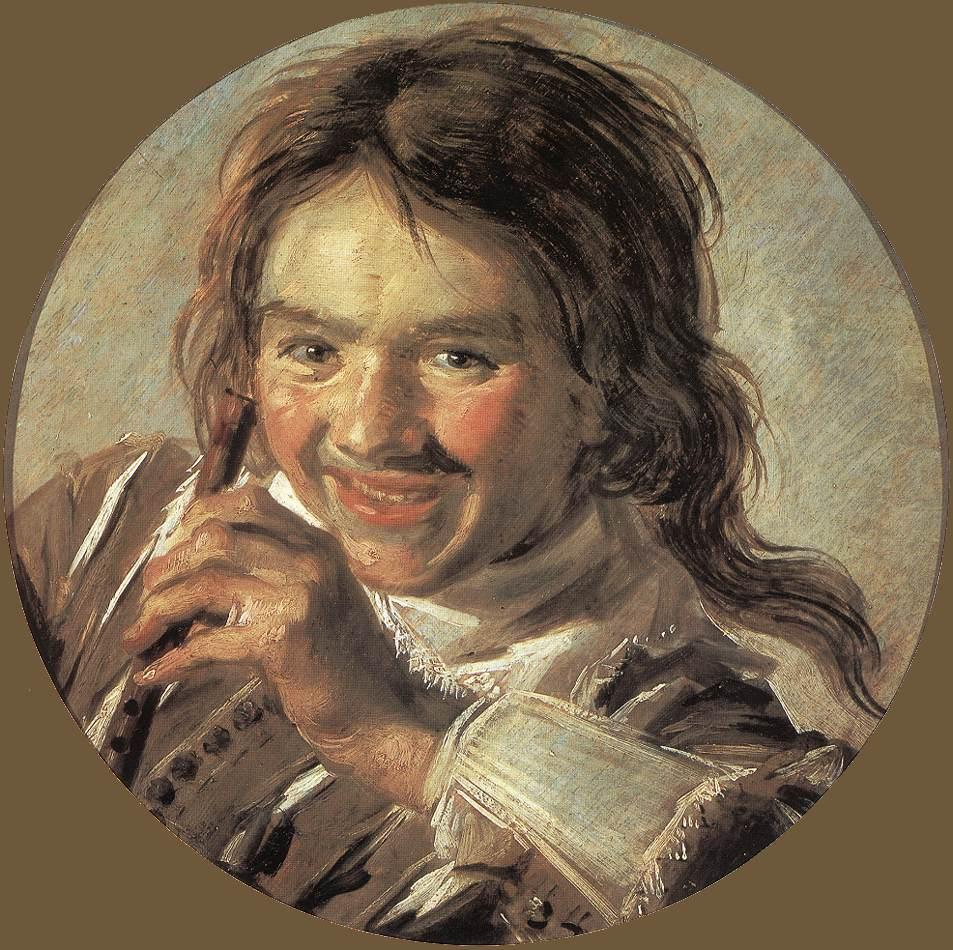
- Boy holding a Flute (Hearing), c.1626. Oil on panel, 37.3 cm round
- Artist: Frans Hals
- Year: 1626
- Catalogue: Seymour Slive, Catalog 1974: #59
- Medium: Oil on panel
- Dimensions: 37.3 cm × 37.3 cm (15 in × 15 in)
- Location: Staatliches Museum Schwerin; Schwerin
- Accession: G2475

Laughing boy with a flute is an oil-on-panel painting by the Dutch Golden Age painter Frans Hals, painted in 1626 and now in the Staatliches Museum Schwerin, Schwerin.

== Painting ==
The painting shows a boy with a flute with his head at an angle facing the viewer.

== Provenance ==
In his 1910 catalog of Frans Hals works Hofstede de Groot wrote: "32. A LAUGHING BOY WITH A FLUTE. B. 118; M. 230. Half-length; life size, almost in full face. The line of the shoulders rises to the left. The head is also almost in full face, but slightly inclined to the left. The long hair falls down, but a lock dangles just above the right shoulder. The eyes look at the spectator. The left hand holds a flute. Light-grey background. Broadly painted. The ground shows through the paint. A life-like rendering. [Pendant to 11.] Circular panel, 15 inches across. In the Schwerin Museum, 1882 catalogue, No. 444"

This painting is a pendant to Boy with a glass and a pewter jug and the pair has long been considered to be part of a series on the five senses, where this one symbolizes hearing and the drinking boy symbolizes taste:

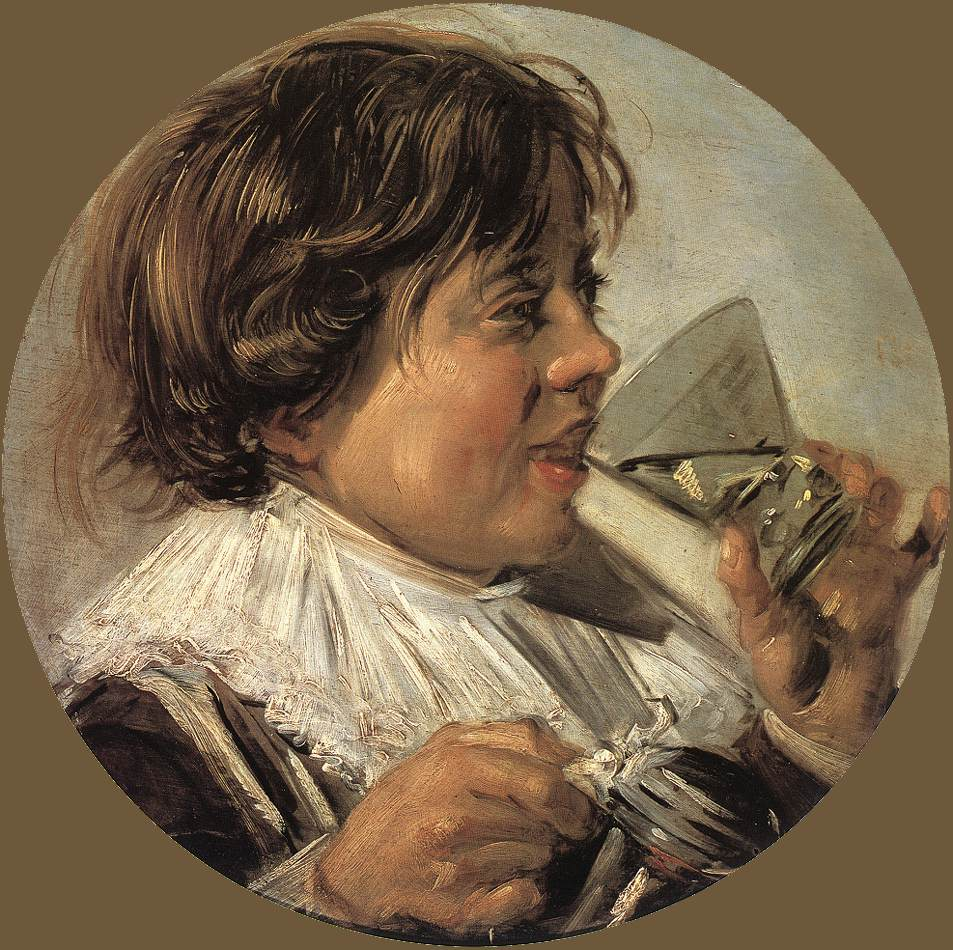
Boy with a glass and a pewter jug

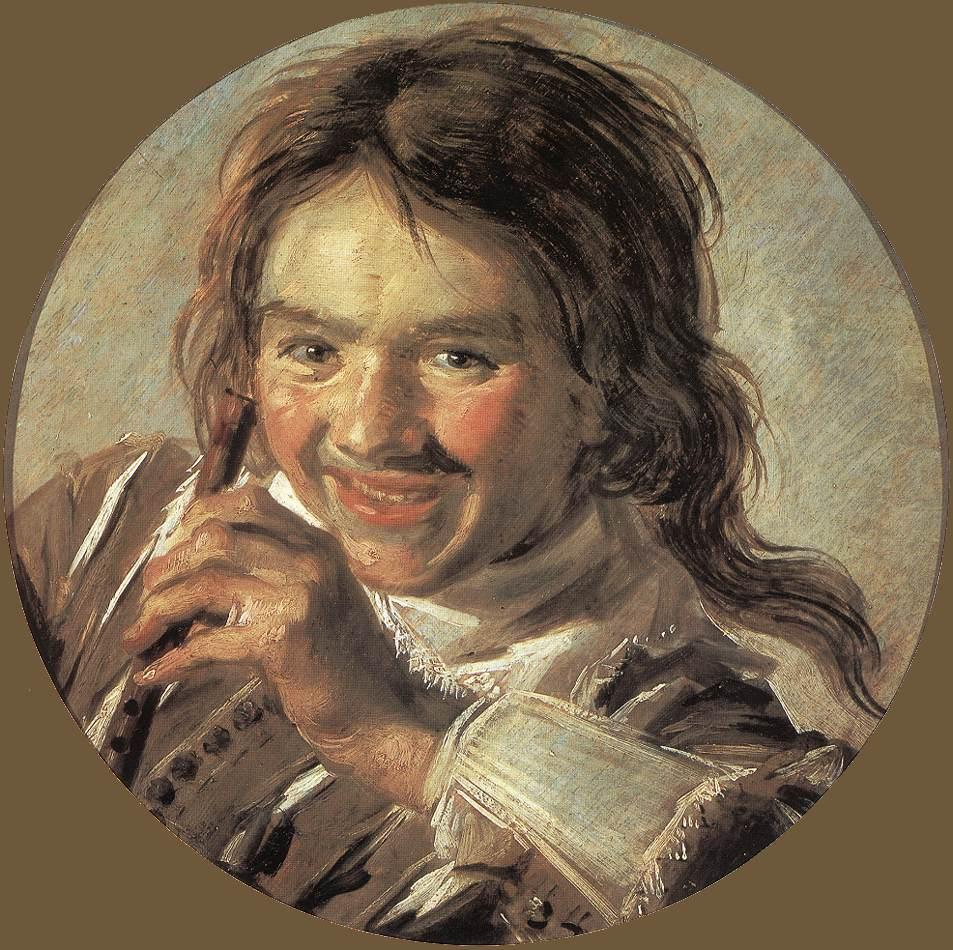
Laughing boy with a flute

== See also ==
- List of paintings by Frans Hals
