= Seymour Slive =

American art historian (1920–2014)

- Born: September 15, 1920; Chicago, Illinois, U.S.
- Died: June 14, 2014 (aged 93); Cambridge, Massachusetts, U.S.
- Spouse: Zoya Gregorevna Sandomirsky (m. 1946)
- Children: 3

Academic background
- Education: University of Chicago
- Thesis: Rembrandt and His Critics, 1630-1730 (1952)

Seymour Slive (September 15, 1920 – June 14, 2014) was an American art historian who served as director of the Harvard Art Museums from 1975 to 1984. He was a scholar of Dutch art, specifically of the artists Rembrandt, Frans Hals, and Jacob van Ruisdael.

== Early life and education ==
A Chicago native and the son of Russian-Jewish immigrants Daniel and Sophia Rapoport, Slive received his bachelor's degree in 1943 and DPhil in 1952, both from the University of Chicago. He served in the United States Navy Reserve during World War II, starting in his junior year of college, and was on active duty in the Pacific Theater from 1942 to 1946.

== Career ==
Slive was appointed to his first teaching position at Oberlin College in 1950, but soon moved on to Pomona College, where he became an assistant professor of art and chair of department from 1952 to 1954. While there, he published his first book, Rembrandt and His Critics, 1630–1730. In 1954, he joined Harvard University, where he became a full professor in 1961. In 1960, he was the first American professor to lecture in Russia under a Cold War exchange agreement. He was appointed chair of the Department of Fine Arts in 1968, remaining in the post until 1971. In 1973, Slive was appointed Gleason Professor of Fine Arts and later concurrently became Director of the University's Harvard Art Museums in 1975. He was the founding director during the creation and expansion of the Arthur M. Sackler Museum. He retired from Harvard in 1991 as emeritus professor and as the Elizabeth and John Moore Cabot Founding Director of the Harvard University Art Museums. A Festschrift containing 69 essays by his students was compiled and presented in his honor on his seventy-fifth birthday in 1995.

== Awards and honors ==
- Director, College Art Association (1958–1962 and 1965–69)
- Fulbright Research Scholar (1959–1960)
- Fellow of the American Academy of Arts and Sciences (1964)
- Corresponding fellow of the British Academy (1995)
- Fellow of the Dutch Society of Sciences.
- Honorary member, Member Karel van Mander Society.
- John Simon Guggenheim foundation fellowships (1956, 1978)
- Officer of the House of Orange-Nassau (1962)
- Charles Rufus Morey Prize, College Art Association (1970)
- Slade Professor of Fine Art at Oxford (1972–73).
- Board of Directors of the Burlington Magazine Foundation
- Trustee of the Guggenheim Museum (1978–2008)
- Award for Achievement in Art History, Art Dealers Association (1979)
- Member of the Consultative Committees of the J. Paul Getty Study Center (1984–91) and Museum (1992–96)
- Trustee, Norton Simon Museum (1989–81)
- Honorary degree of Doctor of Arts from Harvard University (2014) for his contributions to the world of fine art.

== Works ==
- Rembrandt and His Critics, 1630–1730. The Hague: Nijhoff, 1953. ISBN 0878173110
- Dutch Painting. The Library of Great Painters. New York: Abrams, 1953.
- Drawings of Rembrandt, with a Selection of Drawings by His Pupils and Followers. New York: Dover, 1965.
- (With Jakob Rosenberg and Engelbert ter Kuile) Dutch Art and Architecture, 1600 to 1800. Baltimore: Pelican Books, 1966.
- Frans Hals, Volume 1 (His life and state of the literature). London: Phaidon, 1970. ISBN 071481444X
  - Frans Hals, Volume 3 (a catalog raisonné), National Gallery of Art; Kress Foundation. Studies in the History of European Art. London: Phaidon, 1974. Second edition, Phaidon, 2014. ISBN 9780714867557
- Jacob van Ruisdael. Exh. cat. Mauritshuis and Fogg Art Museum. New York: Abbeville,1981. ISBN 0896592375
- Frans Hals, by Slive as editor, with contributions by Pieter Biesboer, Martin Bijl, Karin Groen and Ella Hendriks, Michael Hoyle, Frances S. Jowell, Koos Levy-van Halm and Liesbeth Abraham, Bianca M. Du Mortier, Irene van Thiel-Stroman. Munich: Prestel-Verlag, and Antwerp: Mercatorfonds, 1989. ISBN 3791310321
- Dutch Painting 1600–1800. New Haven: Yale University Press, 1995. ISBN 9780300074512
- Jacob van Ruisdael: A Complete Catalogue of His Paintings, Drawings, and Etchings. New Haven: Yale University Press, 2001. ISBN 0300089724
- Jacob van Ruisdael, Master of Landscape. Exh. cat. London: Royal Academy of Arts, 2005. ISBN 9781903973745
- Shop Talk: Studies in Honor of Seymour Slive, 2006. ISBN 0916724859
- Rembrandt Drawings. Los Angeles: Getty Museum, 2009. ISBN 9780892369768
- Jacob van Ruisdael: Windmills and Water Mills. Los Angeles: Getty Museum, 2011. ISBN 9781606060551
- "A Print after Jacob van Ruisdael." Print Quarterly 29 (September 2012): 320–21. ISSN 0265-8305
