= The Parsonage Garden at Nuenen =

1884 painting by Vincent van Gogh

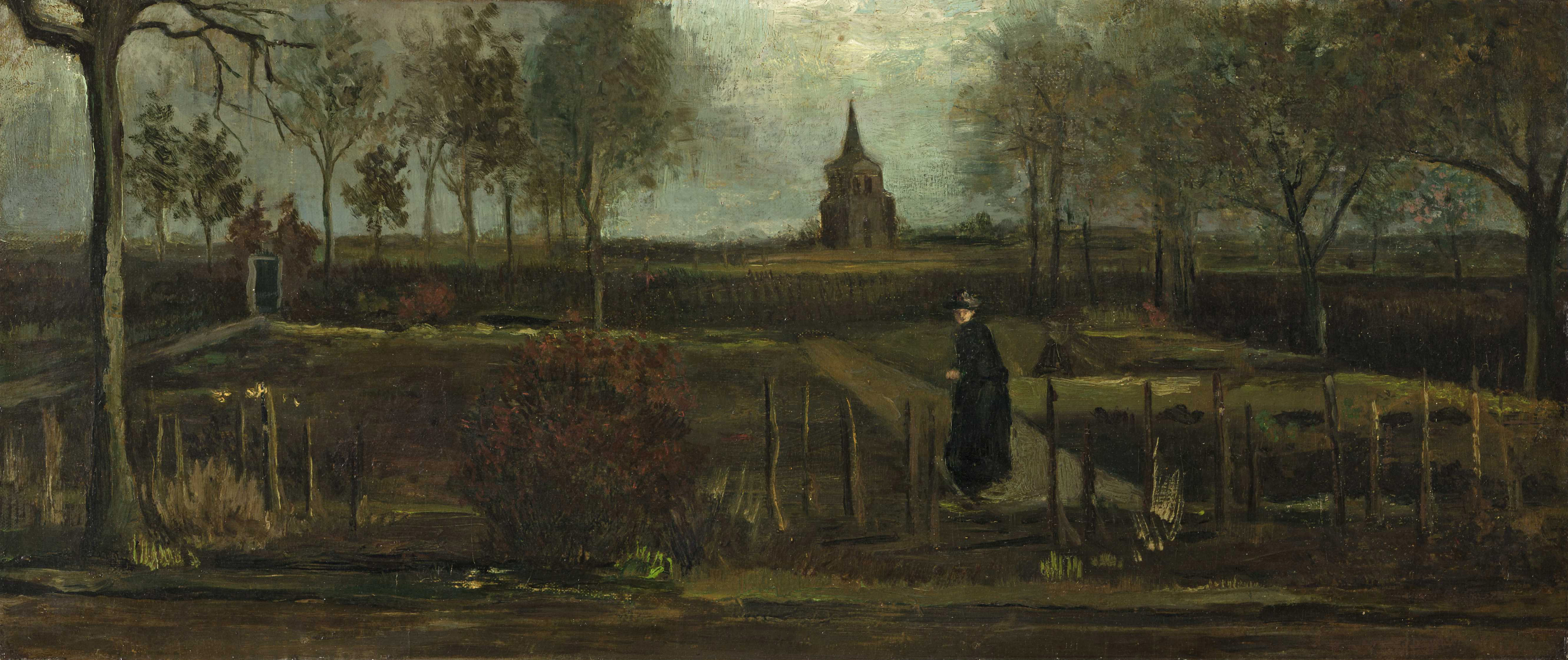
- Artist: Vincent van Gogh
- Year: May 1884
- Catalogue: F185; JH484
- Medium: Oil on paper on panel
- Movement: Post Impressionism
- Dimensions: 25 cm × 57 cm (9.8 in × 22 in)
- Location: Singer Laren
- Owner: Groninger Museum

The Parsonage Garden at Nuenen (Dutch: De pastorie in Nuenen), alternatively named The Parsonage Garden at Nuenen in Spring (Dutch: De pastorie in Nuenen in het voorjaar) or Spring Garden (Dutch: Lentetuin: F185, JH484), is an early oil painting by 19th-century Dutch post-Impressionist painter Vincent van Gogh, created in May 1884 while he was living with his parents in Nuenen. Van Gogh made several drawings and oil paintings of the surrounding gardens and the garden façade of the parsonage.

The painting was in the collection of the Groninger Museum in The Netherlands from 1962 to 2020. On 30 March 2020, it was stolen from an exhibition at the Singer Laren museum in Laren which had been closed due to the COVID-19 pandemic in the Netherlands. The painting was reported as recovered in September 2023.

== Background ==
Van Gogh lived in The Hague with Sien Hoornik and then alone for a few months in Drenthe in the northern Netherlands. He then went to live with his parents in the parsonage of the Dutch Reformed Church at Nuenen near Eindhoven in December 1883 where his father was pastor. The family turned the laundry room into a studio in the back of the house.

Van Gogh remained with his parents in Nuenen for nearly two years, producing about 200 drawings and paintings, including his first major work, The Potato Eaters. He moved to Antwerp in November 1885 and then to Paris in 1886.

== Description ==
In Nuenen, Van Gogh documented the changing seasons in his paintings of the parsonage's garden, which was enclosed by a high stone wall and included a duck pond with a boat dock, paths and hedges, flower and vegetable garden plots and an orchard.

Preceded by a series of wintery drawings, this work was probably painted in May 1884. It depicts a view of the garden with a dark-clothed female figure in the foreground. In the distance are the ruins of the old church, also depicted in works such as Old Church Tower at Nuenen, before it was demolished in 1885. It uses the dark palette of greens and browns, typical of Van Gogh's early work, with touches of green and red in the painting indicating that winter has passed and spring has begun. In a letter that Van Gogh sent to Anthon van Rappard in March 1884, he mentioned the change in the seasons: "Ben ook zoekende naar de kleur van den wintertuin. Doch die is reeds een lente tuin - nu. En is iets heel anders geworden." ("Am also searching for the colour of the winter garden. But it is already a spring garden - now. And has become something completely different.")

The painting is unusually wide, measuring 25 cm × 57 cm (9.8 in × 22.4 in) without its decorative frame, exceeding double square. Van Gogh may have worked with the help of a perspective window (a wooden frame strung with wires). It had been in the collection of the Groninger Museum, in the Dutch city of Groningen, since 1962 but was stolen in 2020.

Other examples of the parsonage garden at Nuenen in Van Gogh's work

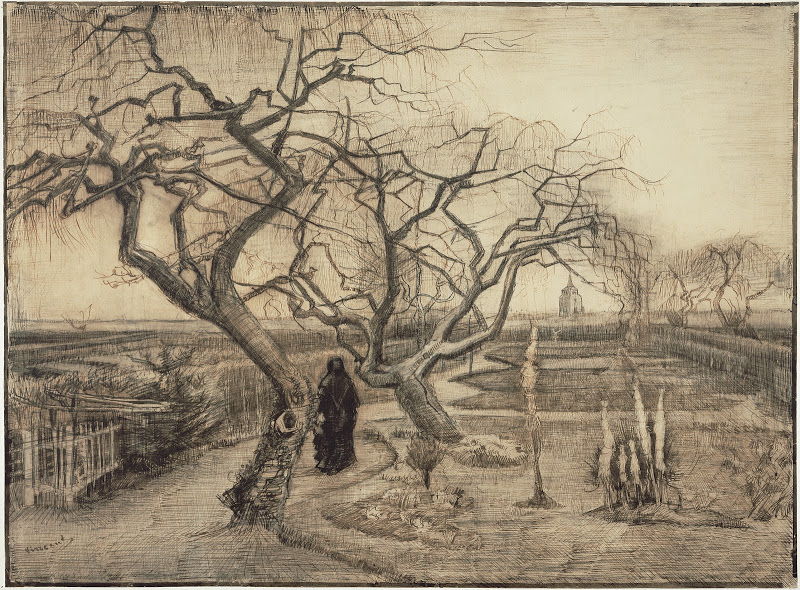
Winter Garden ("Wintertuin"), pencil and ink drawing, March 1884, Van Gogh Museum, Amsterdam (F1128, JH466)

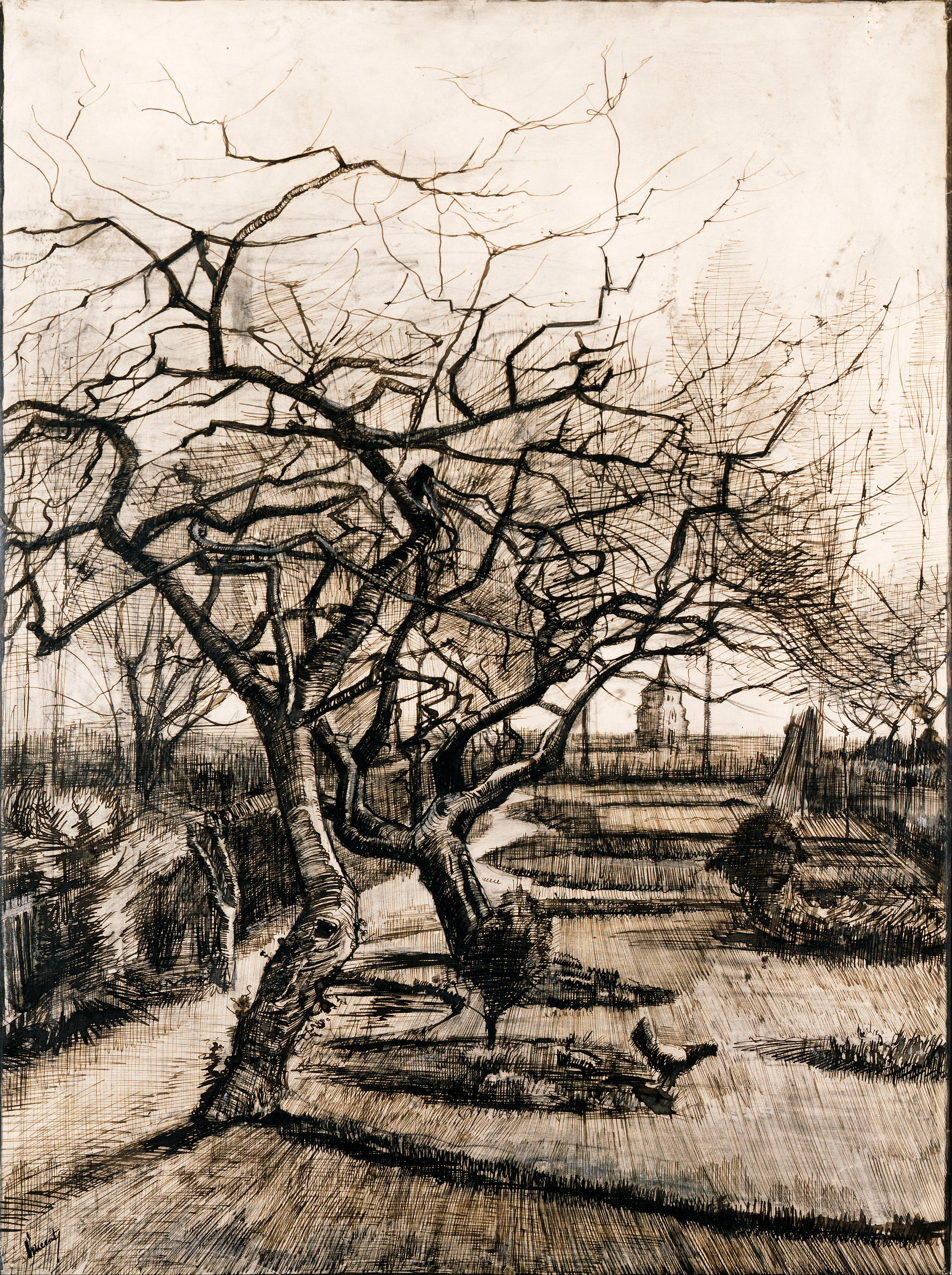
The Parsonage Garden at Nuenen in Winter, pen and ink drawing, March 1884, Museum of Fine Arts, Budapest (F1130, JH465)

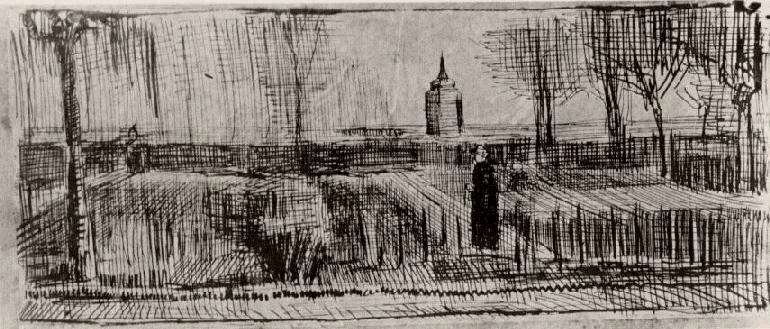
Parsonage Garden, April 1884, small drawing sent to Anthon van Rappard, private collection (F1188)

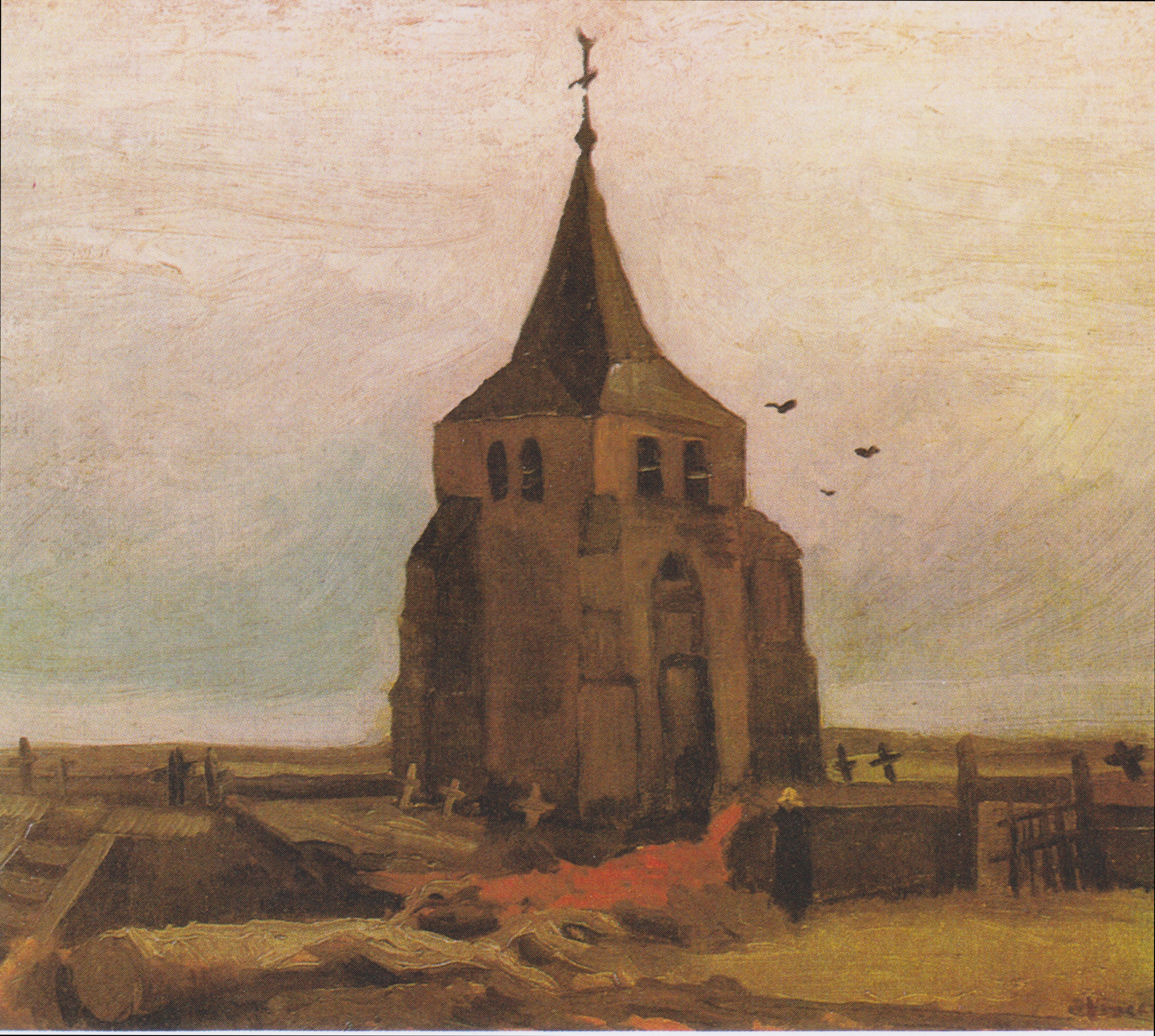
Old Church Tower at Nuenen, May 1884, oil on canvas on panel, Foundation E.G. Bührle Collection, Zürich (F88, JH490)

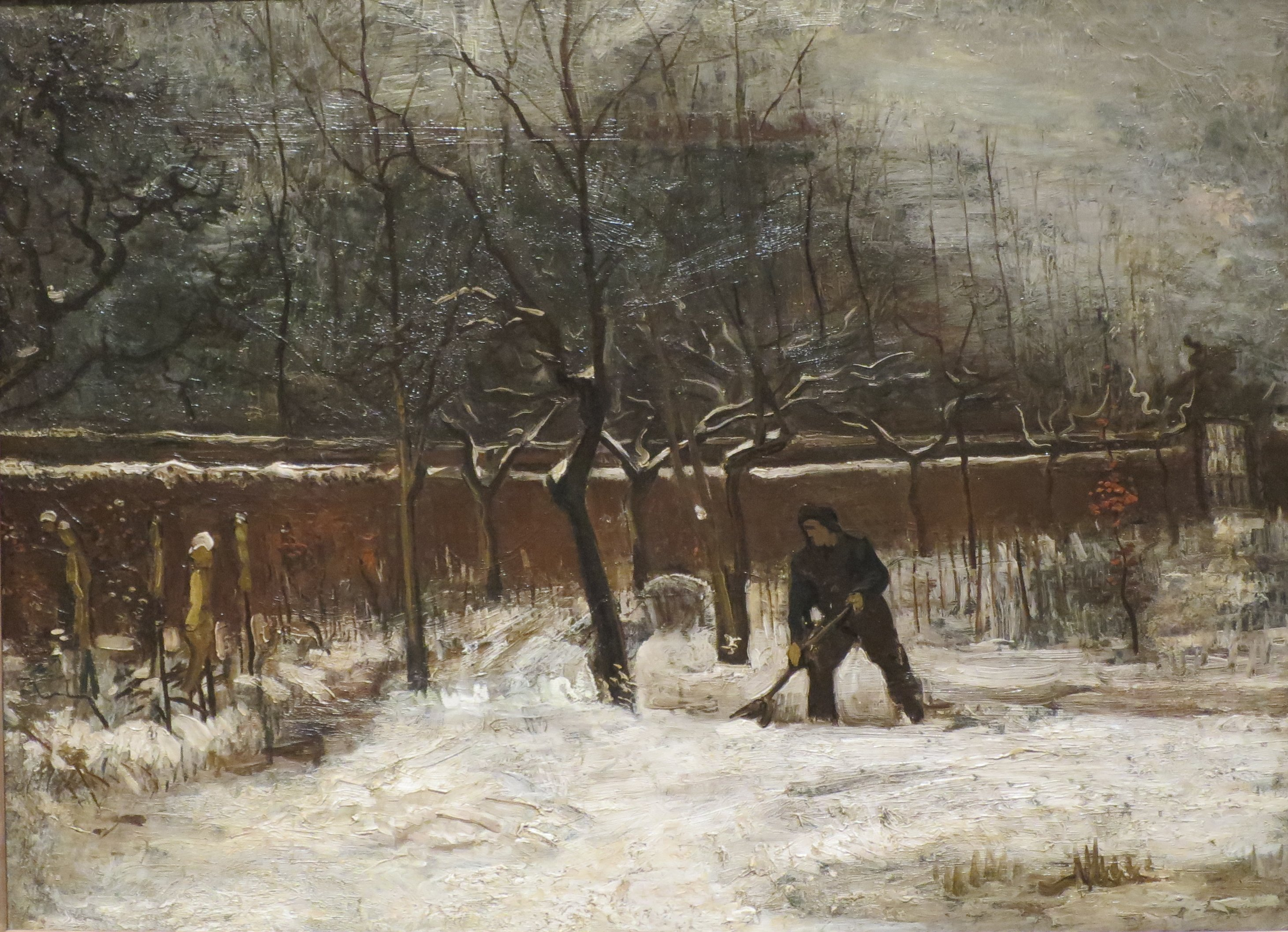
The Parsonage Garden in Nuenen in the Snow, oil on canvas on panel, January 1885, Norton Simon Museum, Pasadena (F194, JH603)

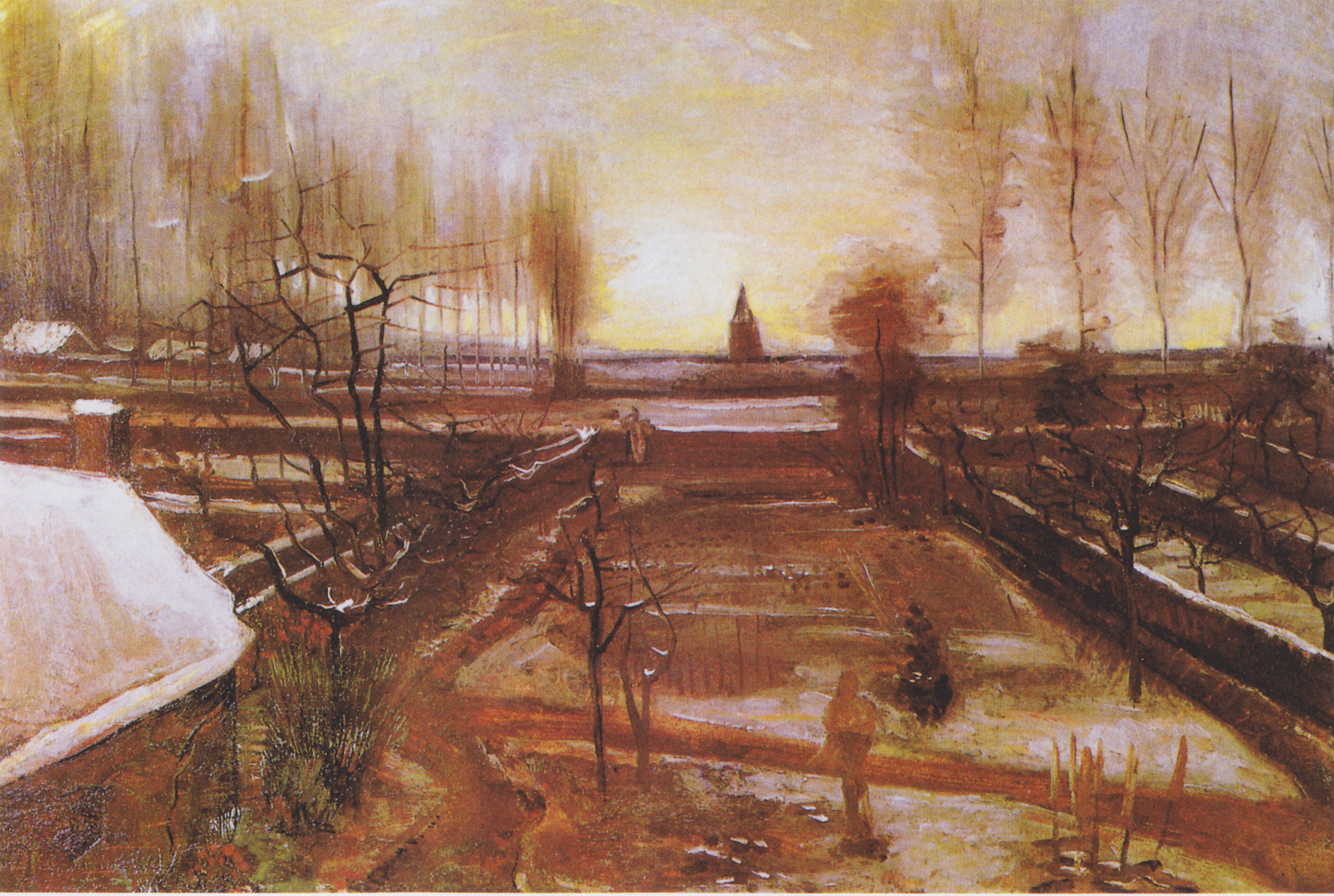
The Parsonage Garden in Nuenen in the Snow, oil on canvas on panel, January 1885, Armand Hammer Museum of Art, Los Angeles (F67, JH604)

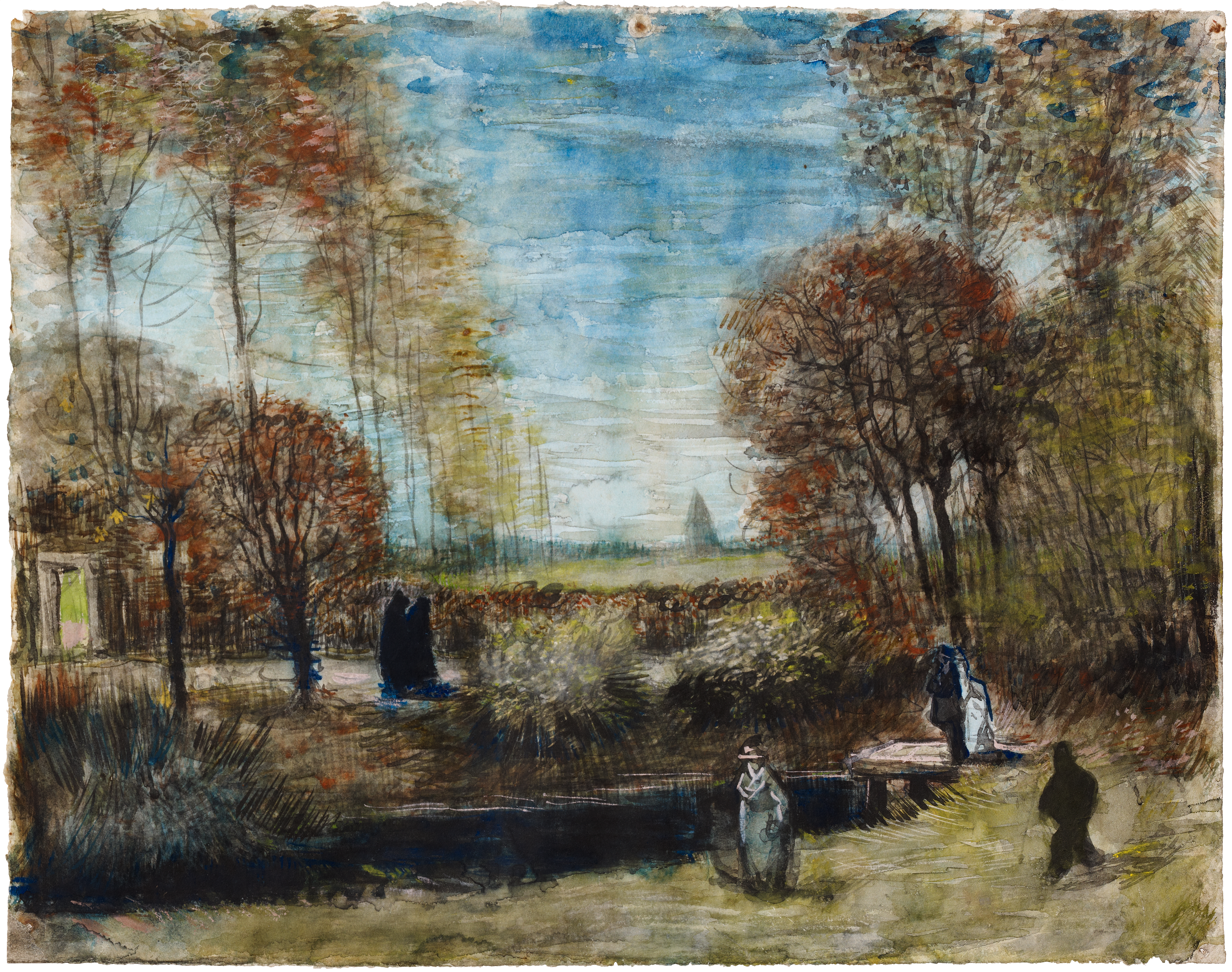
The Parsonage Garden at Nuenen, watercolour on paper, October/November 1885, Noordbrabants Museum, ’s-Hertogenbosch (F1234, JH954)

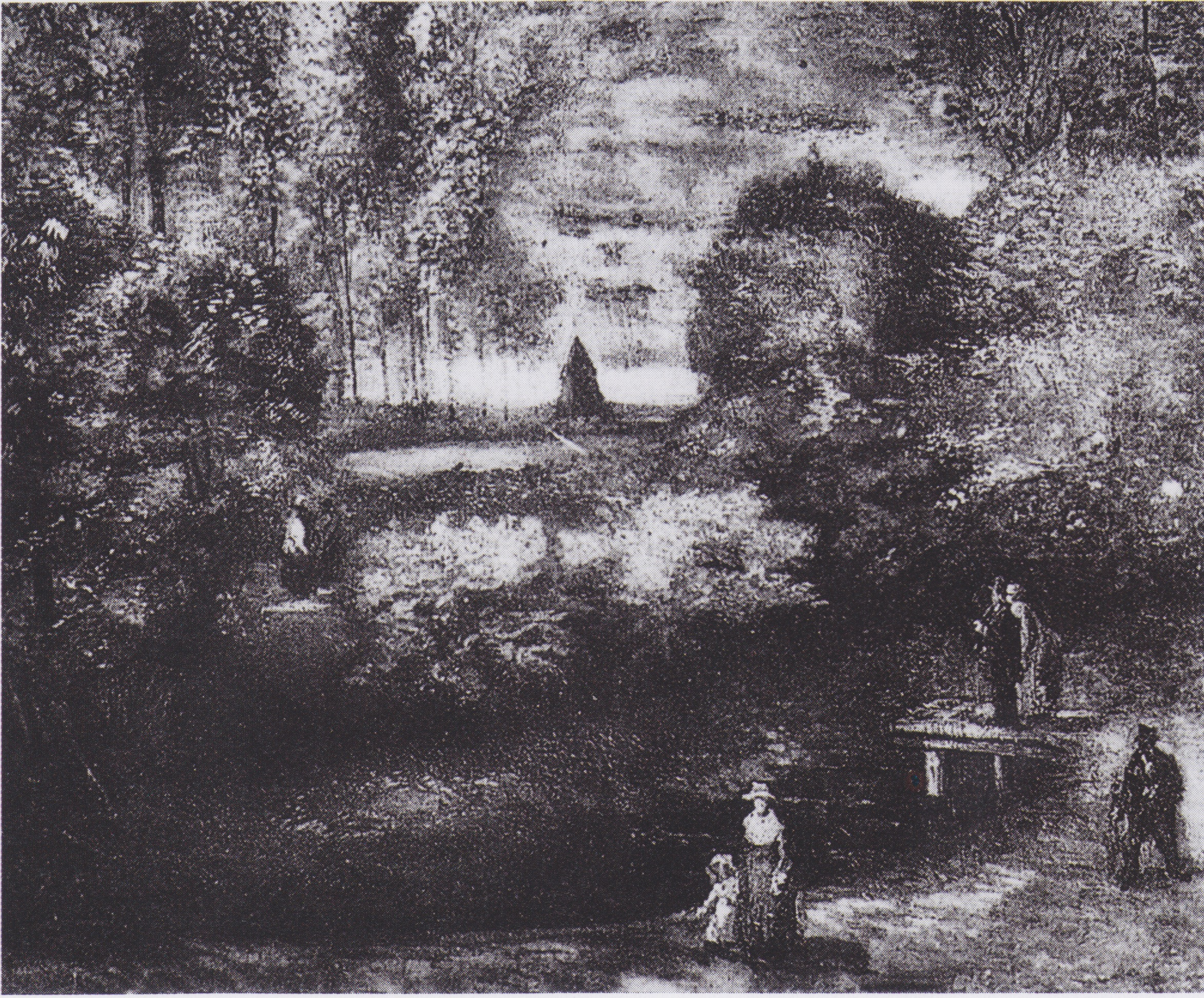
The Parsonage Garden at Nuenen with Pond and Figures, oil on panel, 1885, destroyed by fire in Rotterdam in the Second World War (F124, JH955)

== Theft ==
The painting was stolen from the Singer Laren museum in Laren, North Holland on 30 March 2020, Van Gogh's birthday. The painting had been on loan from the Groninger Museum. At the time of the theft, the museum was closed to the public due to the COVID-19 pandemic. Police said the thief or thieves smashed through the glass doors with a sledgehammer around 3:15 a.m. and left before law enforcement responded to the alarm. Museum director Jan Rudolph de Lorm said, "I'm shocked and unbelievably annoyed that this has happened."

In June, photographs of the painting with a copy of the New York Times dated 30 May were sent to detective Arthur Brand. Also in the photo was the book Meesterdief (English: Masterthief). He compared this to the theft of two paintings from the Van Gogh Museum, Amsterdam in 2002. Groniger Museum director Andreas Blühm said he was pleased that the painting still existed and believed the photographs were genuine. Since 1988, twenty-eight Van Gogh paintings have been stolen in the Netherlands, but all have been recovered.

In early April 2021, Dutch police arrested a man in Baarn, Utrect in connection with the theft of the painting and also that of the c. 1626 painting Twee Lachende Jongens met een Mok Bier by Frans Hals, which had been stolen from the Hofje van Mevrouw van Aerden, in Leerdam, Utrecht on 26 August 2020. Neither of the paintings had then been recovered. Brand told a reporter that the person in custody probably did not know the location of the works because "stolen artwork was often moved around quickly by criminal gangs". According to unnamed sources, the value of the painting was estimated as "up to £5m" in articles published by Deutsche Welle and The Guardian. On 24 September, the man was convicted of the thefts and sentenced to eight years imprisonment.

In September 2023, Brand recovered the painting in cooperation with the Dutch police. According to Brand, after some negotiation he persuaded a man, who Brand said had “nothing to do with the theft”, to hand back the artwork.

== See also ==
- Art theft
- Impact of the COVID-19 pandemic on the arts and cultural heritage
- List of stolen paintings
- List of works by Vincent van Gogh
