= Maria Ponderus =

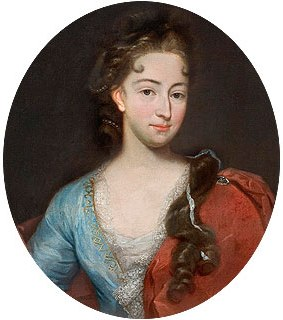
Portrait of Maria van Aerden-Ponderus

Mevrouw van Aerden, née Maria Ponderus (January 27, 1672 – April 20, 1764), was an 18th-century art collector and hofje founder from the Dutch Republic.

== Biography ==
She was born in Monster, South Holland as the daughter of a surgeon and Latin school director. She married the wealthy notary Pieter van Aerden in The Hague in 1692. After he died in 1719, Maria inherited his wealth, his art collection, which she kept, and his "shell cabinet", which she sold the same year.

Maria lived to a great age, outliving her three children and decided to found a hofje in perpetuity for her poor female relatives of The Hague rather than distributing the estate in equal shares. She had purchased some land for this purpose north of the Maliebaan, but by the time she died however, most of her poorer relatives were no longer living in the Hague, but were located in Leerdam and upon her death, the regents she had chosen to execute her wishes decided to build the hofje in Leerdam. Women who could prove their relation to her were welcome to live there and received an allowance and were given turf blocks (a form of fuel like coal).

The hofje still exists and is called Hofje van Mevrouw van Aerden. Like her contemporaries Aleida Greve and Maria Duyst van Renswoude, Maria Ponderus made many stipulations in her will to preserve her property in perpetuity. The regent's room still has the entire art collection left to her by her husband and is interesting as an example of 18th-century tastes in art.

Maria van Aerden-Ponderus died in her home in the Hague and was buried in her family grave at 's-Gravenzande.
