= Two Singing Boys with a Lute and a Music Book =

Painting by Frans Hals

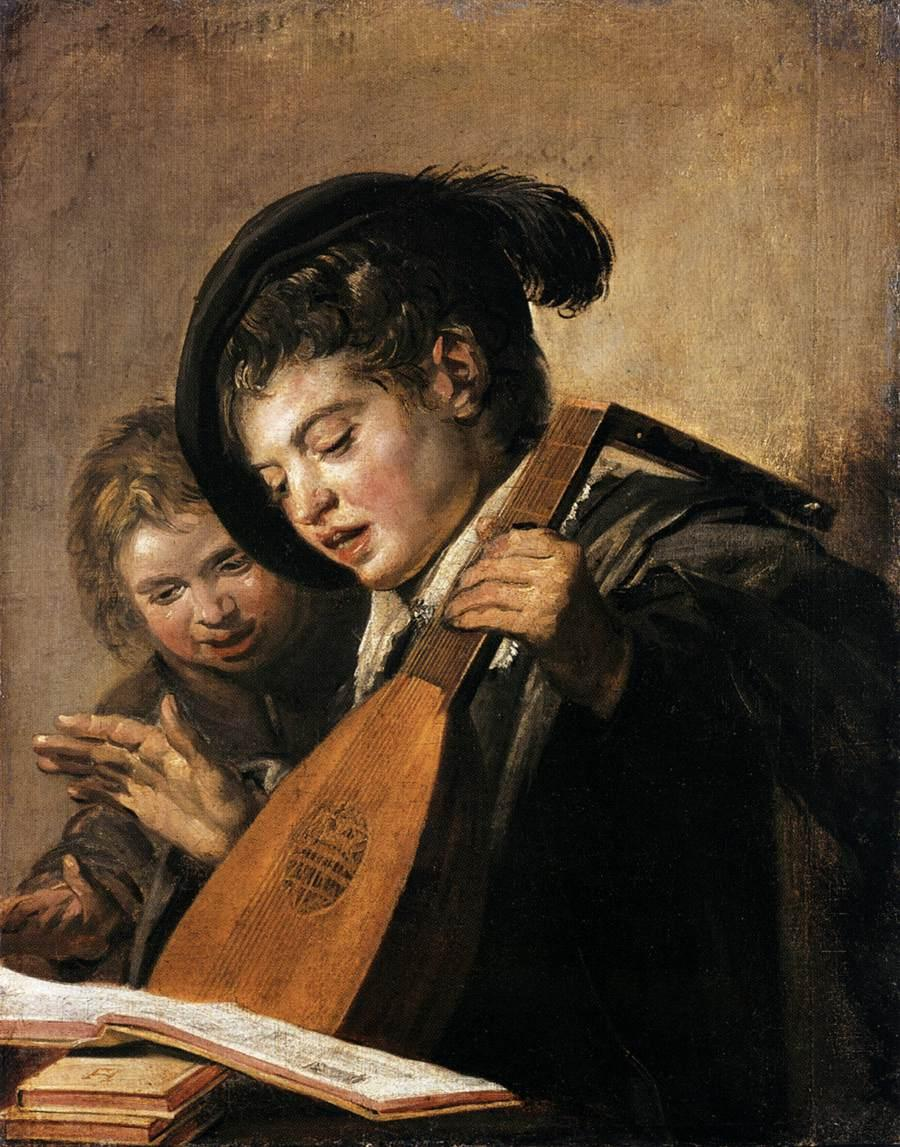
- Two singing boys with a lute and a music book, c. 1625 Oil on canvas, 76 x 52 cm
- Artist: Frans Hals
- Year: c. 1625
- Catalogue: Seymour Slive, Catalog 1974: #23
- Medium: Oil on canvas
- Dimensions: 76 cm × 52 cm (30 in × 20 in)
- Location: Museum Schloss Wilhelmshöhe, Kassel
- Accession: GK215

Two singing boys with a lute and a music book is a painting by the Dutch Golden Age painter Frans Hals, painted c. 1625 and now in the Museum Schloss Wilhelmshöhe.

== Painting ==
This painting was documented by Hofstede de Groot in 1910, who wrote: "TWO BOYS SINGING. B. 98; M. 224 - The boy on the right is seen in a three-quarter view facing left. He is in dark clothes with a white collar and a plumed cap. He holds in his left hand a lute resting on the table, while he beats time with his right hand. He looks down to the left at an open music-book on the table. Behind him to the left is the head of another boy, who looks at the music and sings with him. Signed on the left at foot with the monogram; canvas, 26 inches by 20 1/2 inches."

Hals has "an accomplice" peering over his shoulder, and besides the other two paintings already mentioned, this theme of a main subject with a secondary witness was common to many of his paintings of the 1620s:

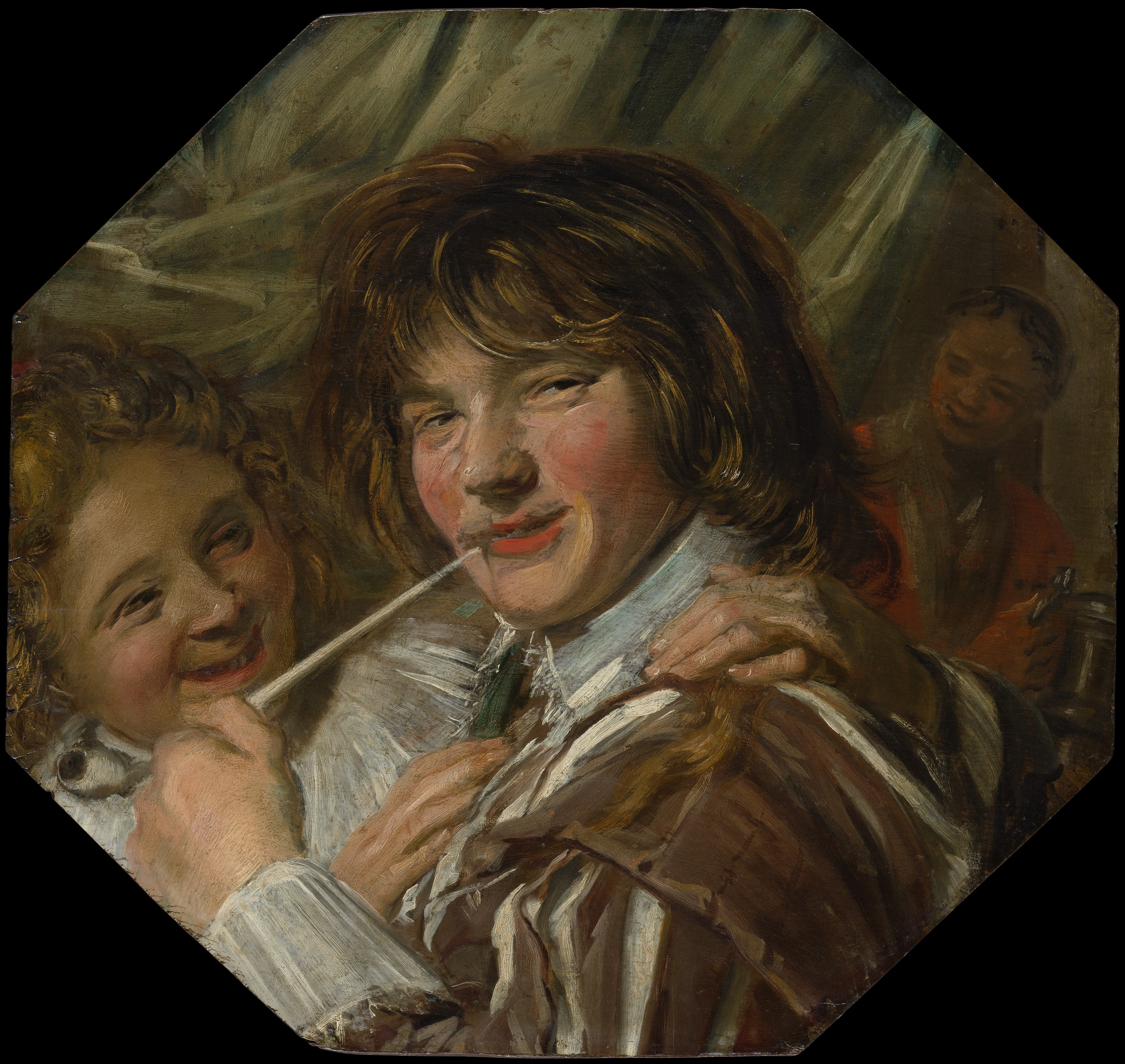
The Smoker, with an accomplice on the left and another in the background on the right

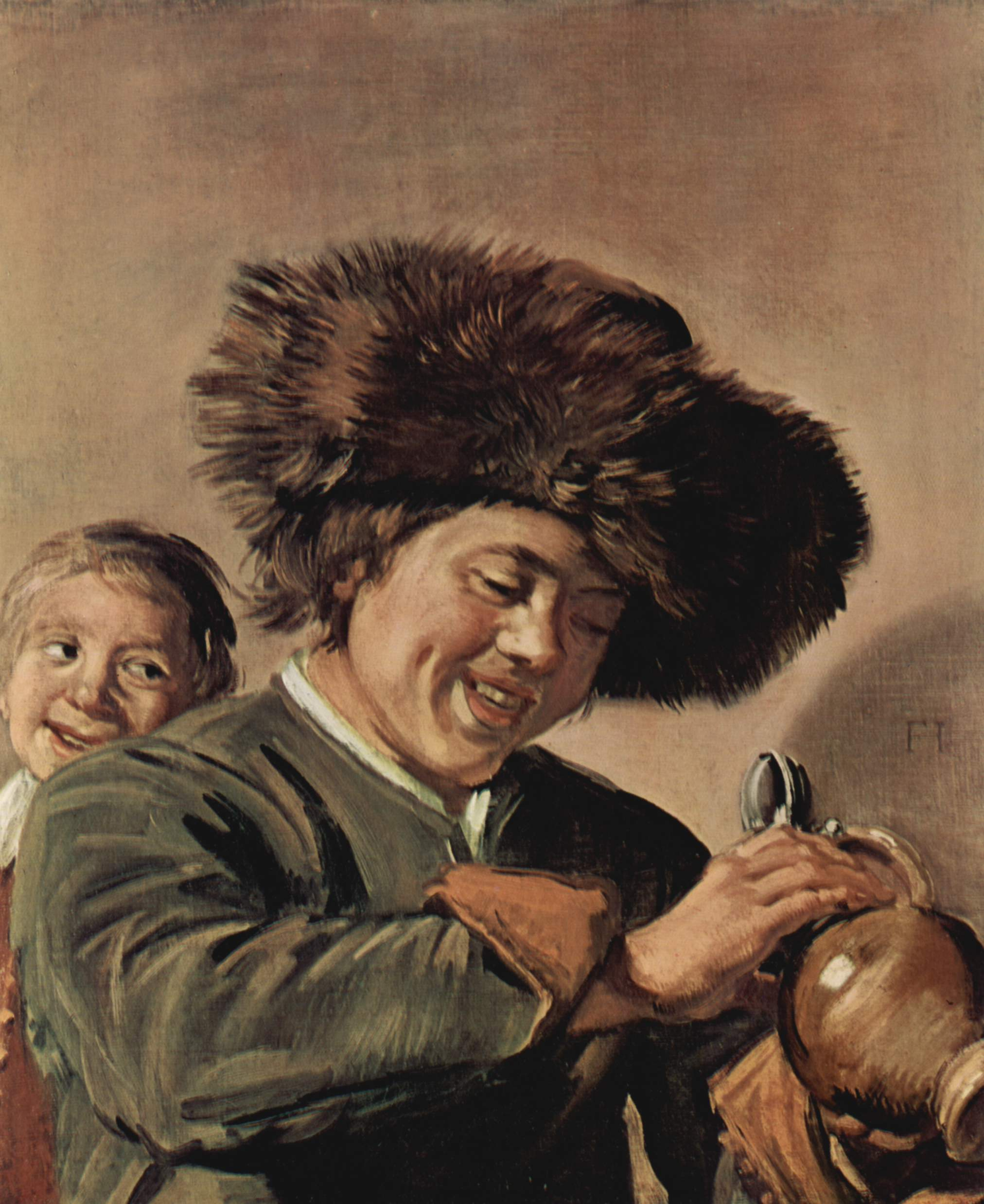
Two laughing boys with mug of beer, with an accomplice on the left

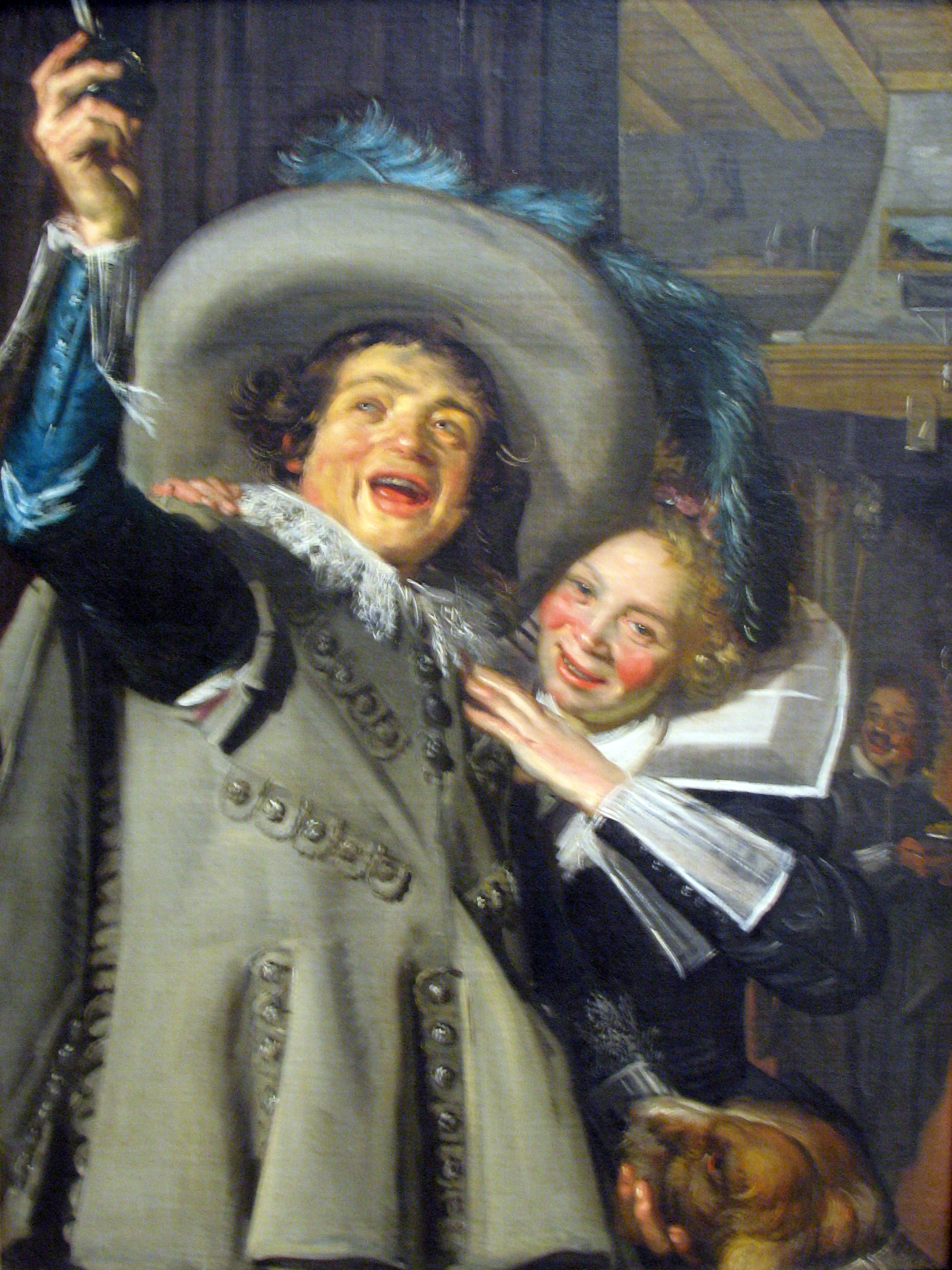
Yonker Ramp and his sweetheart, with an accomplice on the right

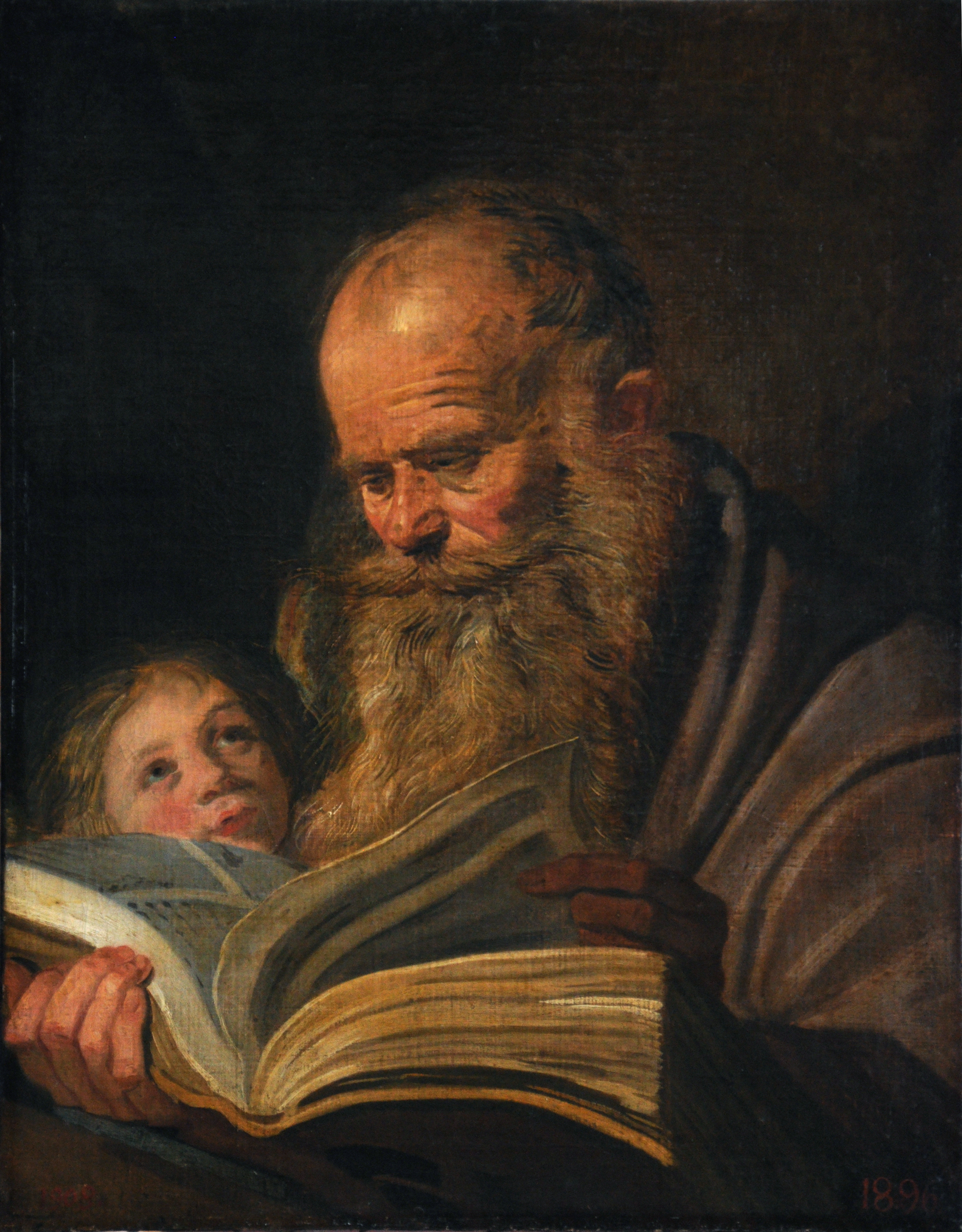
The evangelist Matthew and the angel, with an accomplice on the left

== See also ==
- List of paintings by Frans Hals
