= Royal Leerdam Crystal =

Dutch glassworks producer

- Industry: nonmetallic minerals industry
- Founded: 1878
- Fate: Closed
- Headquarters: Leerdam, Netherlands
- Owner: Royal Delft Group

Royal Leerdam Crystal (also known as Royal Leerdam) was a Dutch producer of glassware products based in Leerdam, the Netherlands.

== History ==
It was established in 1878 as a department within a glassware producing factory, Glasfabriek Leerdam, itself founded in 1765. From 1938 until 2002 it was part of the Schiedam-based Vereenigde Glasfabrieken. In 2002, the factory became part of the American glass and tableware company Libbey Inc. In 2008, Royal Leerdam was purchased by De Koninklijke Porceleyne Fles, becoming part of the Royal Delft Group. In September 2020, as a result of the COVID-19 pandemic, the glass-making facilities were shut. In 2022, Libbey Glass sold the company to the Dutch Anders Invest Industrie Fonds. There are about 600 employees in the Netherlands and Portugal with annual sales of about €120 million. In the Netherlands, the headquarters and a glass factory are in Leerdam and there is a distribution center in Gorinchem. The total acquisition price was not disclosed. The management of the company will stay on and cooperation with Libbey will be continued.

== Designing and glassblowing ==
Designing and glassblowing were in the past strictly separated. Several well-known designers as Hendrik Petrus Berlage, Karel de Bazel, Andries Copier, Sybren Valkema, and Willem Heesen have contributed to the Royal Leerdam reputation with a wide range of designer glassware. Best known has become the so-called range of products Gilde Glass (1930) by Andries Copier, as an example of both simplicity and beauty. Glass art created by Royal Leerdam Crystal was and still is very sought after by museums and collectors worldwide.

== Museums ==
- Nationaal Glasmuseum in Leerdam
- Museum van der Togt in Amstelveen
- Museum Boymans-van Beuningen in Rotterdam

== See also ==
- Glass art

== In popular culture ==
- The factory of Royal Leerdam Crystal was featured in the 1958 short documentary film Glass by Bert Haanstra. The documentary won an Academy Award for Documentary Short Subject in 1959.
