= Hofje van Mevrouw van Aerden =

Museum in Leerdam, Netherlands

Coordinates: 51°53′25.29″N 5°5′30.20″E

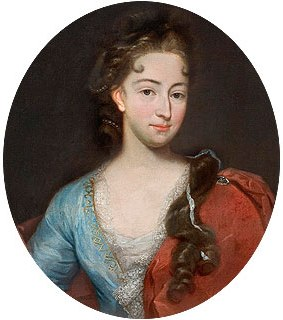
Maria Ponderus, the founder of the hofje

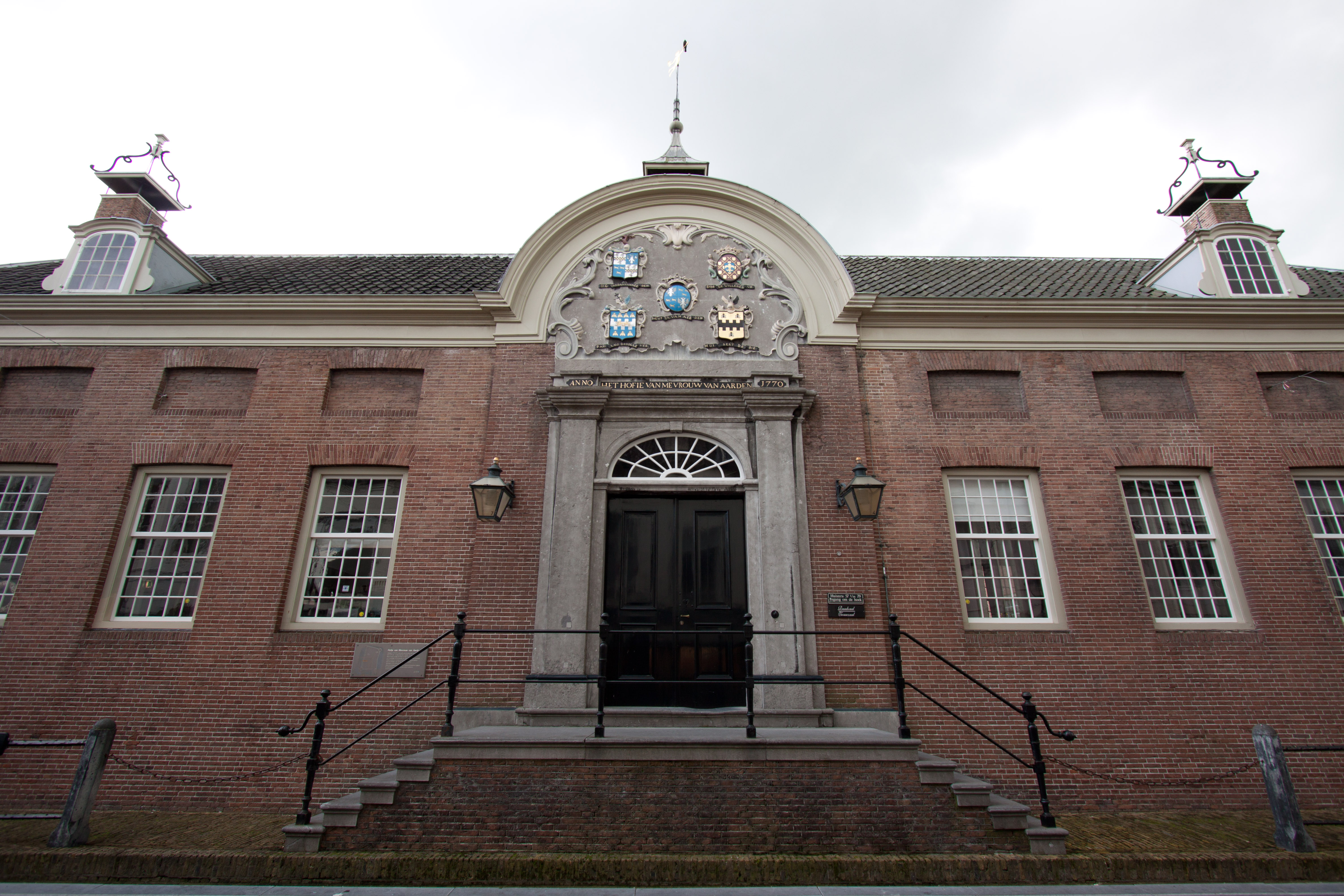
Hofje van Mevrouw van Aerden.

The Hofje van Mevrouw van Aerden is a museum and former hofje in Leerdam, Netherlands, on the Kerkstraat (numbers 57 and 89).

It was built during the years 1770-1772 on the former location of the "Kasteel van Leerdam", a castle that was destroyed by the Spanish in 1574. The hofje was founded by Maria Ponderus, the daughter of a surgeon who at 20 married the 50-year-old widower Pieter van Aerden, notary in The Hague. She lived to 92, surviving her husband and three children, who also had no issue. She decided to leave her fortune to a hofje for women of the Protestant faith. Though she had intended her hofje for the poor of The Hague, by the time she died the most of her poor relations were living in Leerdam. Through connections with the House of Orange, the site of the old castle of Leerdam was chosen to build the hofje.

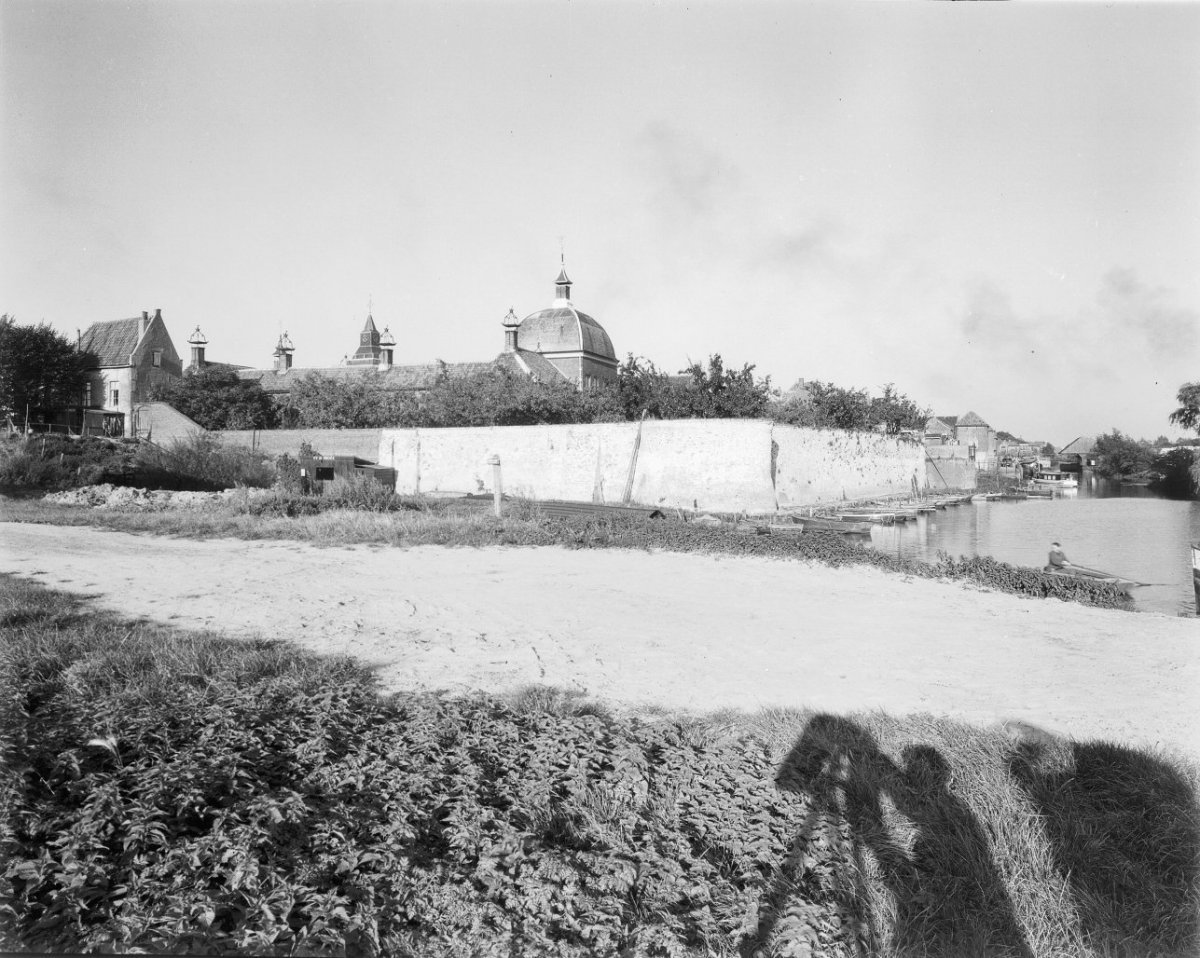
Hofje seen from the southwest; on the right is the Linge river and the remains of a castle wall and tower can be seen.

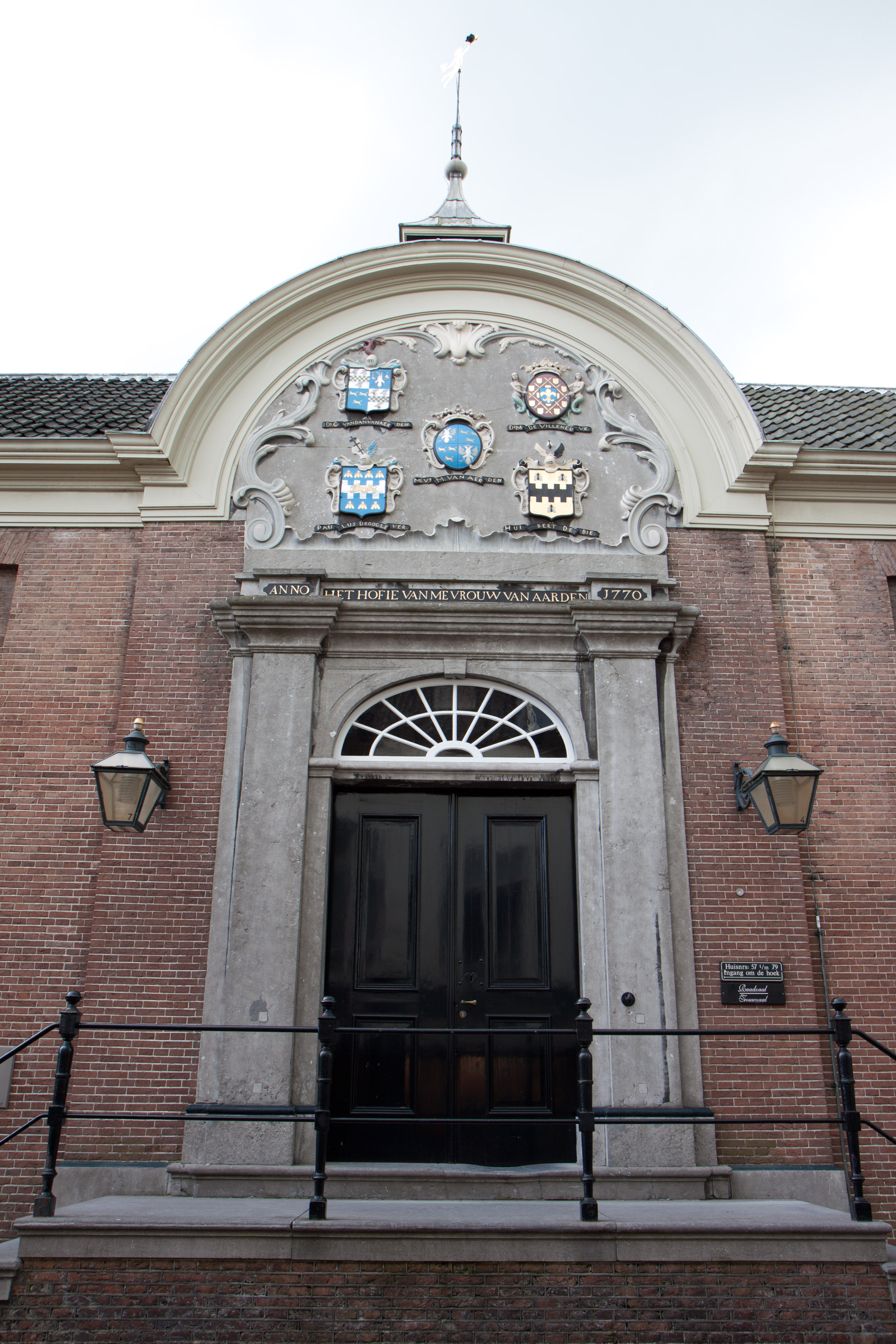
The heraldic shields above the doorway are "Dr. C. van Dam van Aerden", "Dr. M. de Villaneuve", "Mevr. M. van Aerden", "Paulus Drooglever", and "Huibert de Bie".

== Art collection ==
A large collection of paintings was also left to the hofje, including paintings by leading 17th-century Dutch painters such as genre pieces by Frans Hals (1x), Cornelis de Man (1x), Dirck van der Lisse (2x), and Theodoor van Thulden (1x); portraits by Adriaen Hanneman (1x), Hendrick Cornelisz van Vliet (2x), Gerard ter Borch (2x), and Mattheus Verheyden (2x); still lifes by Pieter Claesz (1x), Cornelis de Heem (2x), Ottomar Elliger (1x), and Laurens Craen (1x); and landscapes by Hendrick Jacobsz Dubbels (2x), Philips Koninck (1x), and Jacob Salomonsz van Ruysdael (1x). These hang in the regent's rooms.

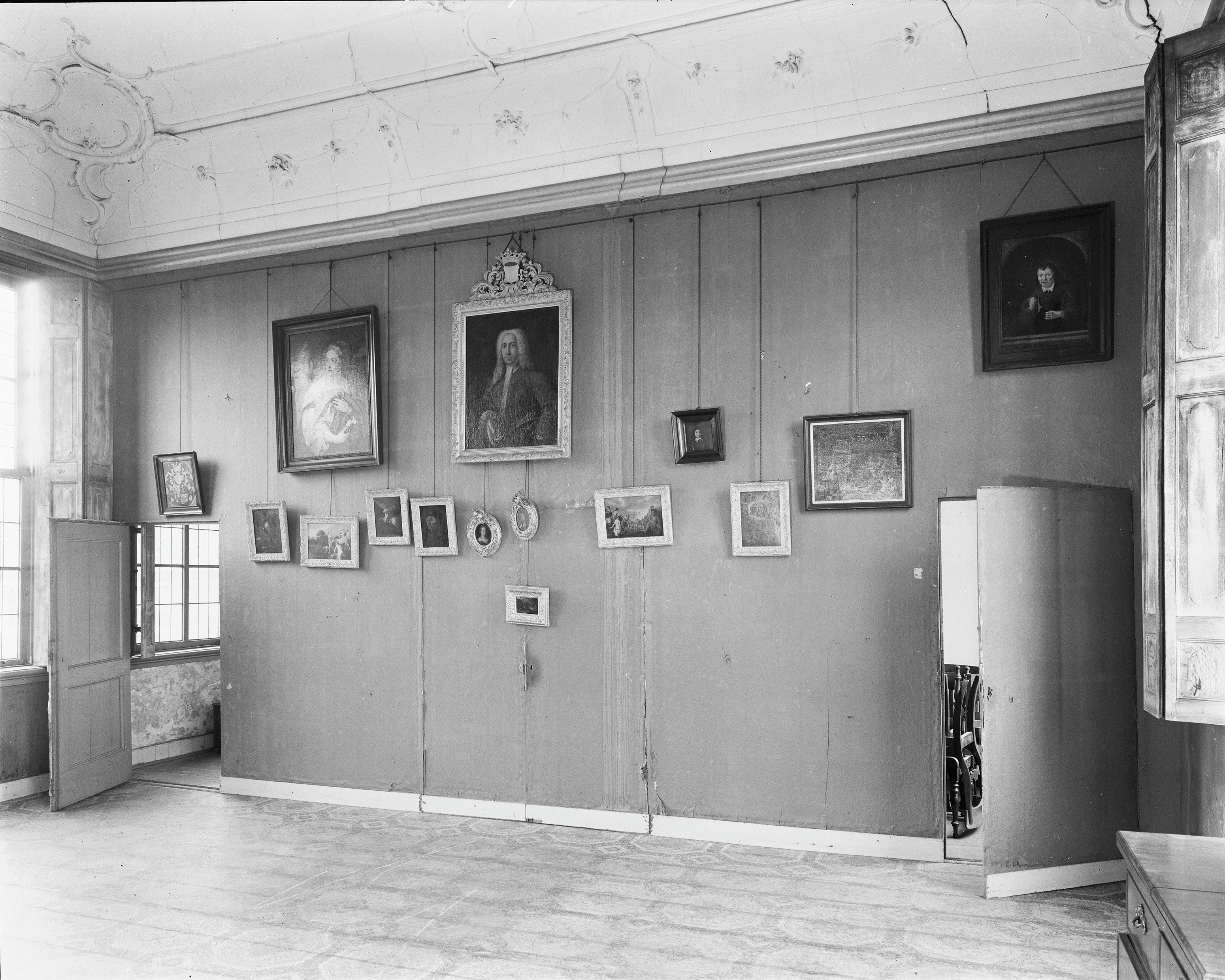
First Regent's room

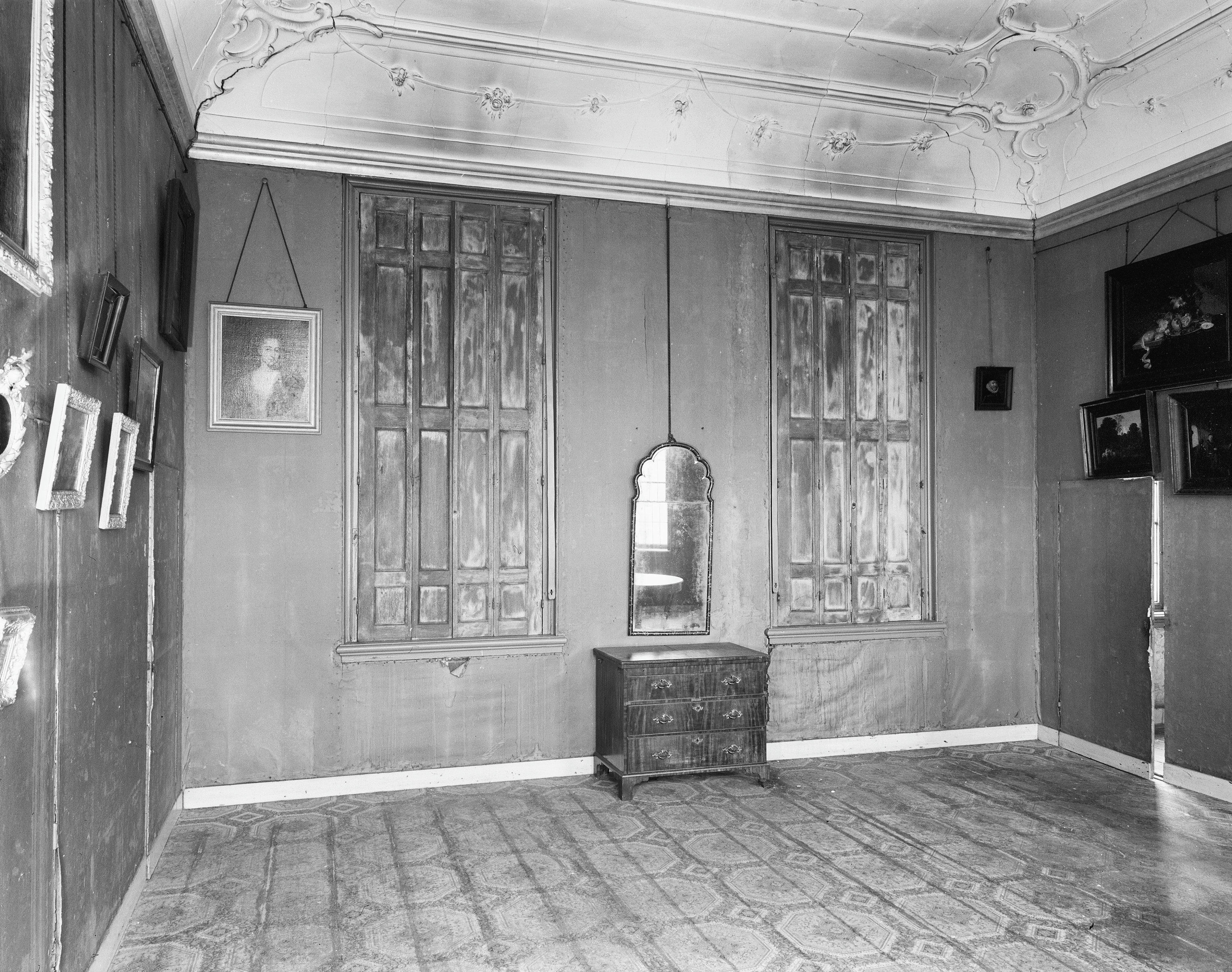
Portrait of Maria Ponderus, possibly by Willem Jacob Herreyns

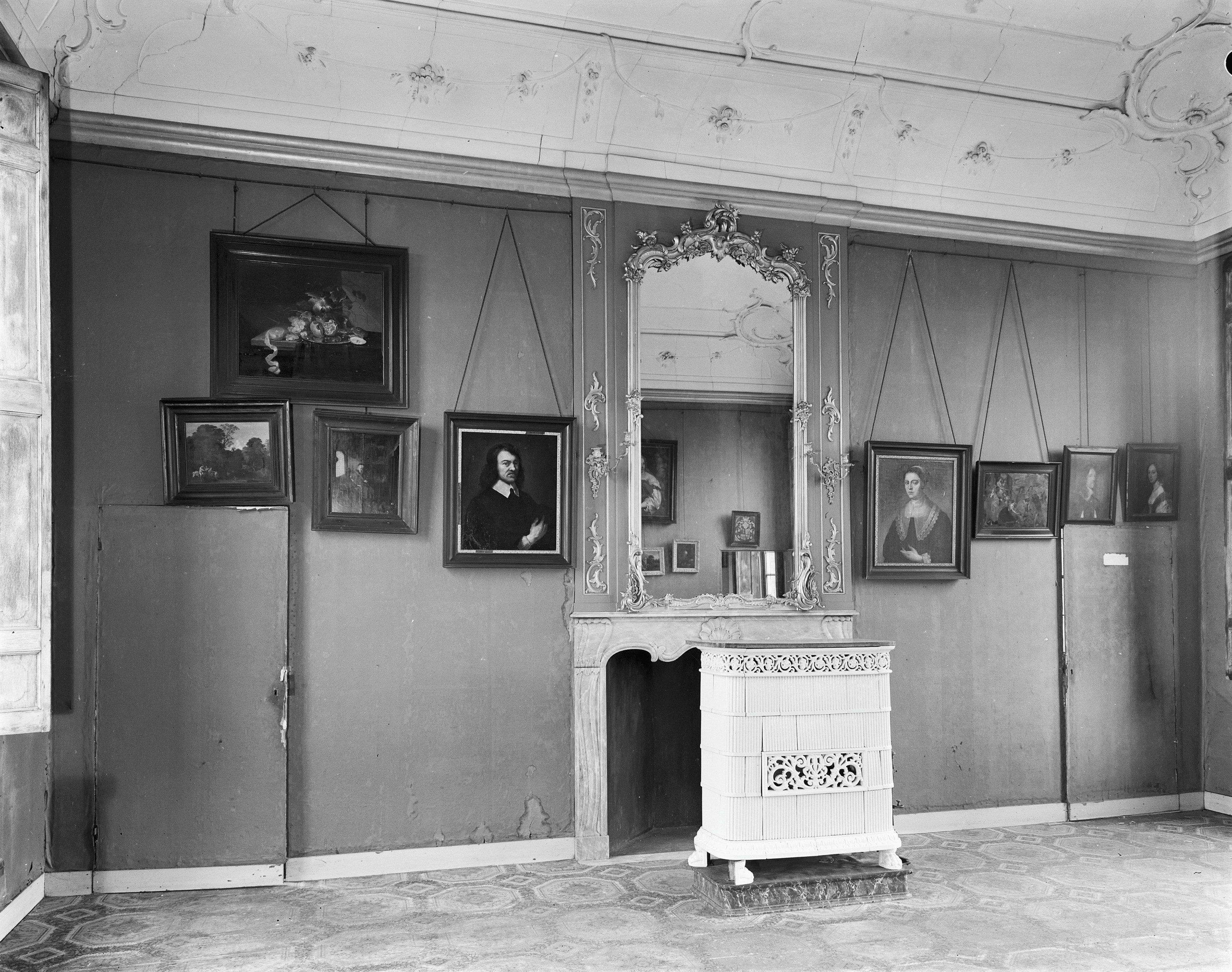
On the left Still life with fruit, oysters and a wineglass by Laurens Craen and on the right Achilles recognizes the daughters of Lykomedes

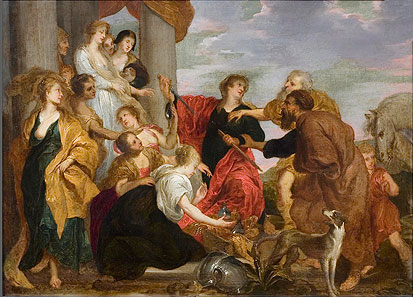
Achilles recognizes the daughters of Lykomedes, by a follower of Anthony van Dyck
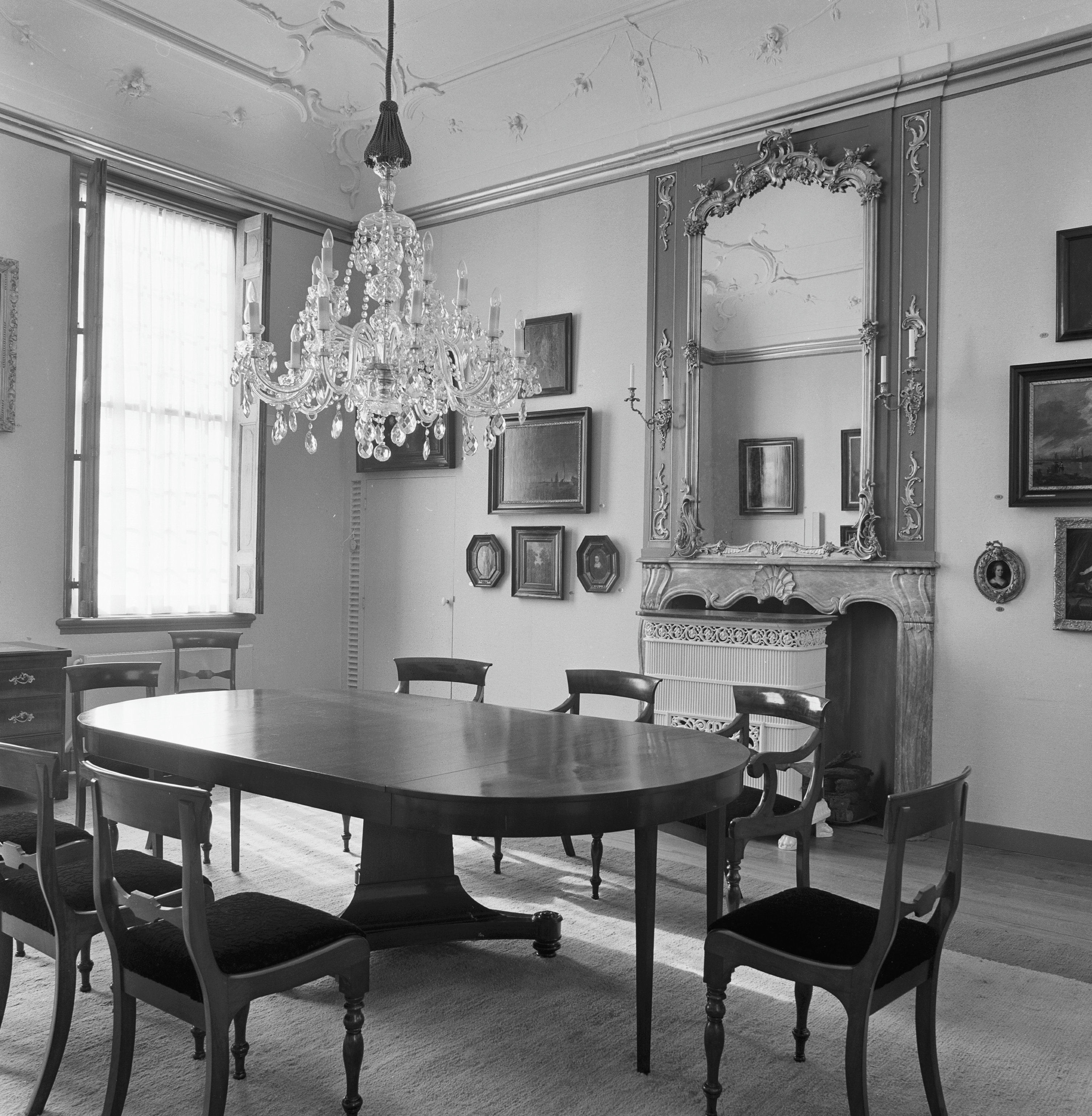
Other Regent's room

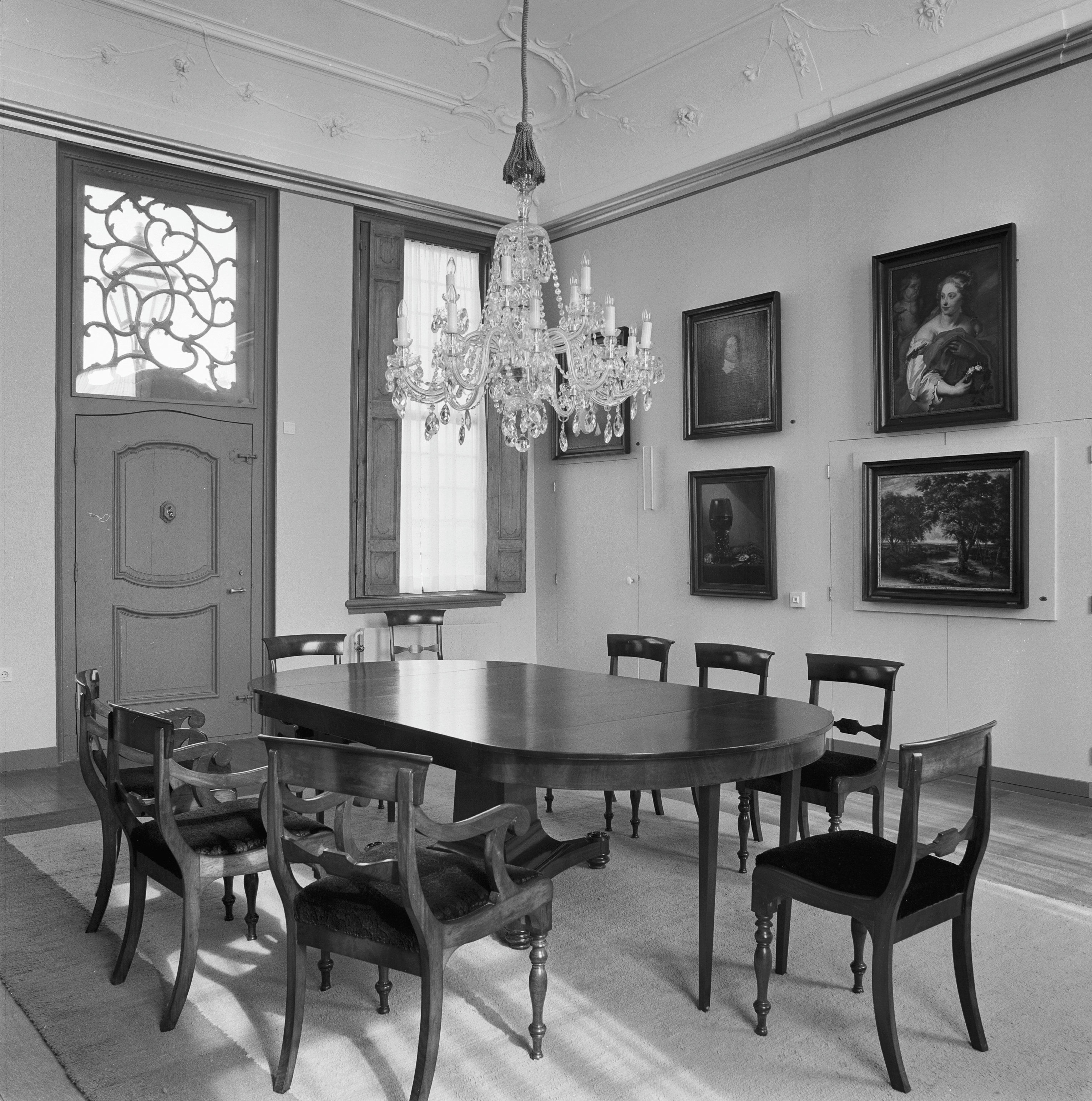
On the left, the still life by Pieter Claesz.

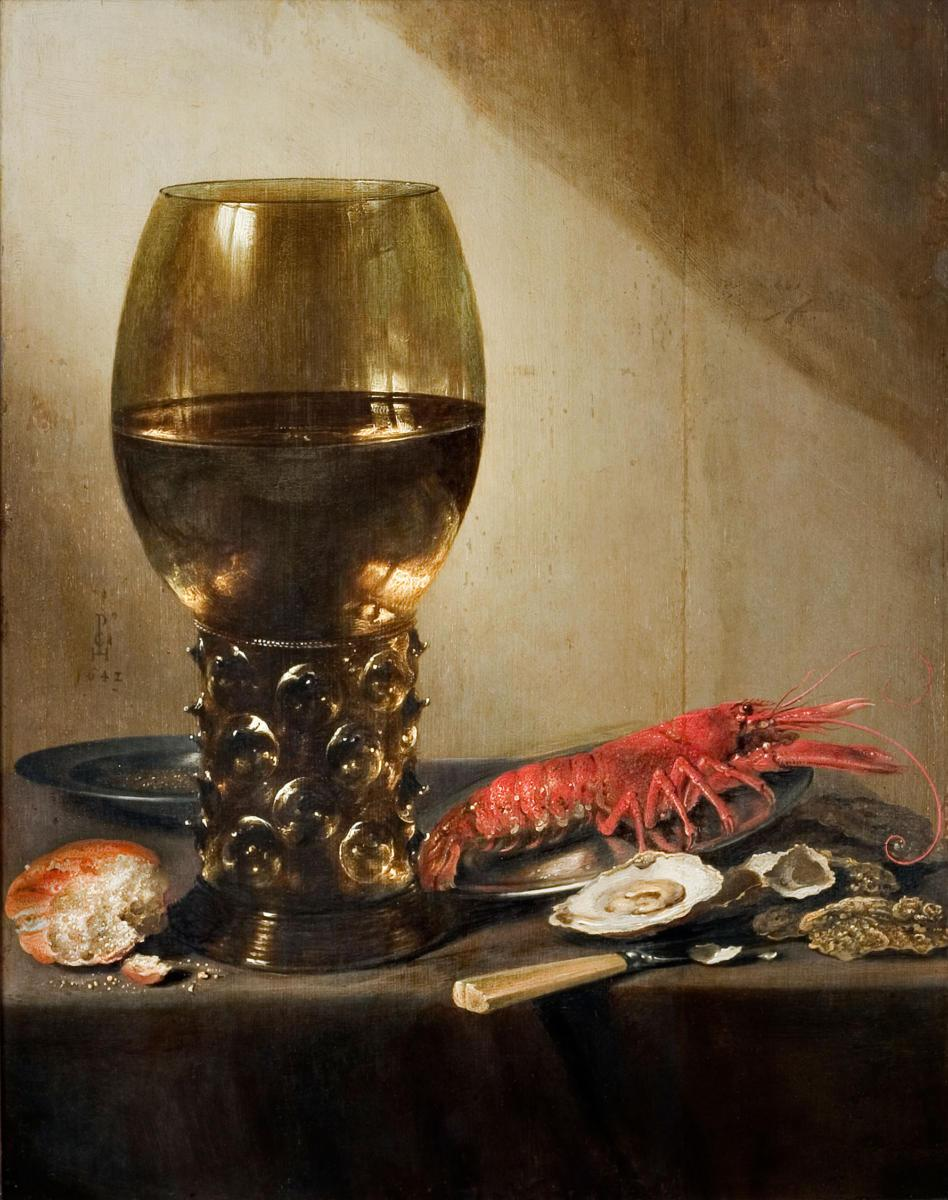
Still life by Pieter Claesz.

On 28 May 2011 the paintings Two laughing boys with mug of beer by Hals and Wooded landscape by Jacob van Ruysdael were stolen. On 2 November 2011 they were recovered.
