= Two Laughing Boys with a Mug of Beer =

Painting by Frans Hals

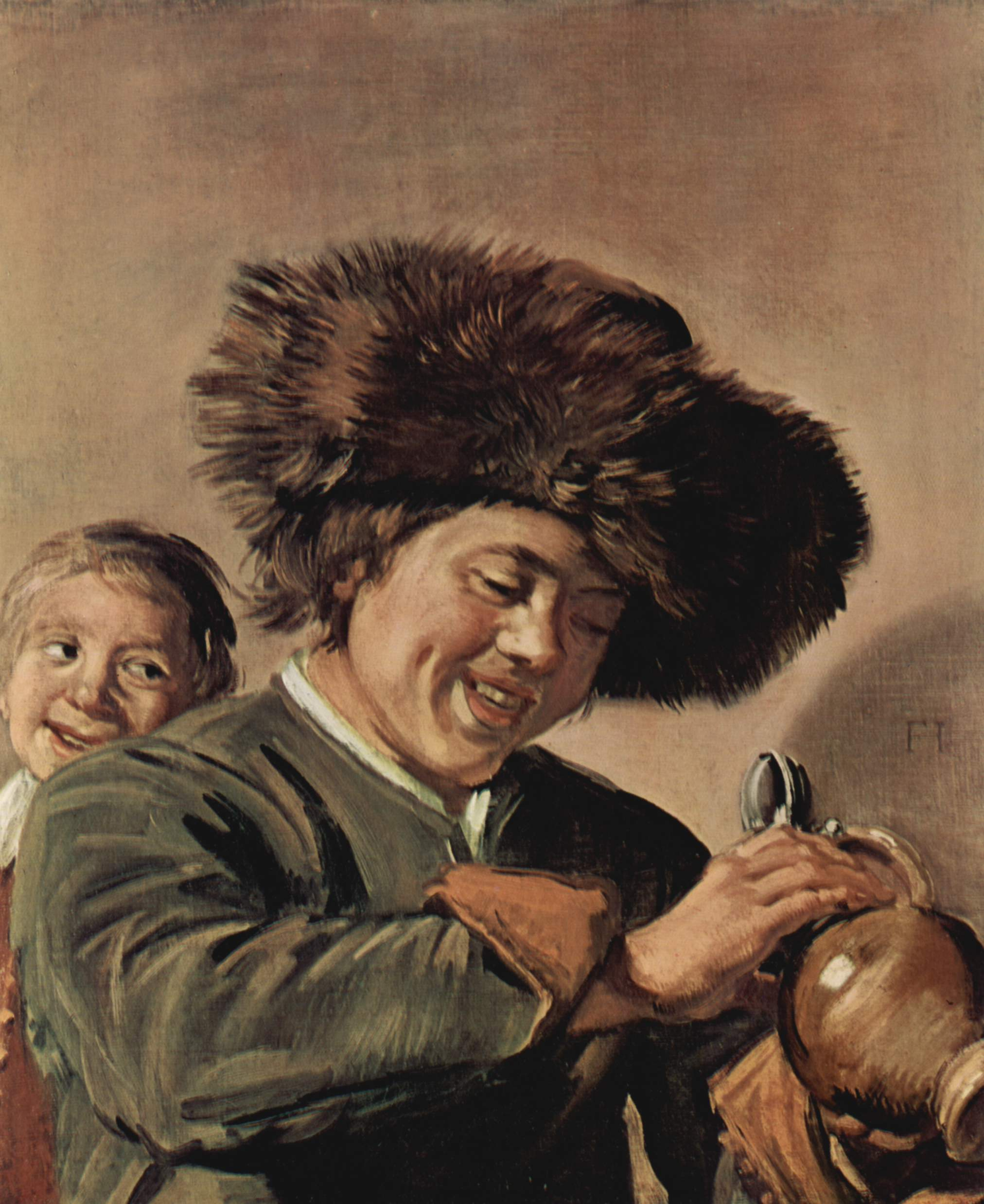
- Two laughing boys with mug of beer, c.1626, oil on canvas, 69 x 56.5 cm
- Artist: Frans Hals
- Year: c. 1626
- Catalogue: Seymour Slive, Catalog 1974: #60
- Medium: Oil on canvas
- Dimensions: 68 cm × 56.5 cm (27 in × 22.2 in)
- Location: Missing (stolen from) Hofje van Mevrouw van Aerden; Leerdam
- Accession: Br.L.4

Two Laughing Boys with a Mug of Beer is an oil-on-canvas painting by Frans Hals, created c. 1626, showing a Kannekijker (mug-looker). It should hang in the Hofje van Mevrouw van Aerden museum at Leerdam in the Netherlands, but it was stolen from there in 2020 and is still missing.

== Themes ==
In old Dutch a Kannekijker, someone looking into a mug, refers to a glutton, somebody greedy for more. This theme of seeing is also present in the painting, as one of the five senses, and various experts have argued about whether this portrait was meant as one in a series, along with Two Boys singing for hearing, and a variant version of The Smoker for smell:

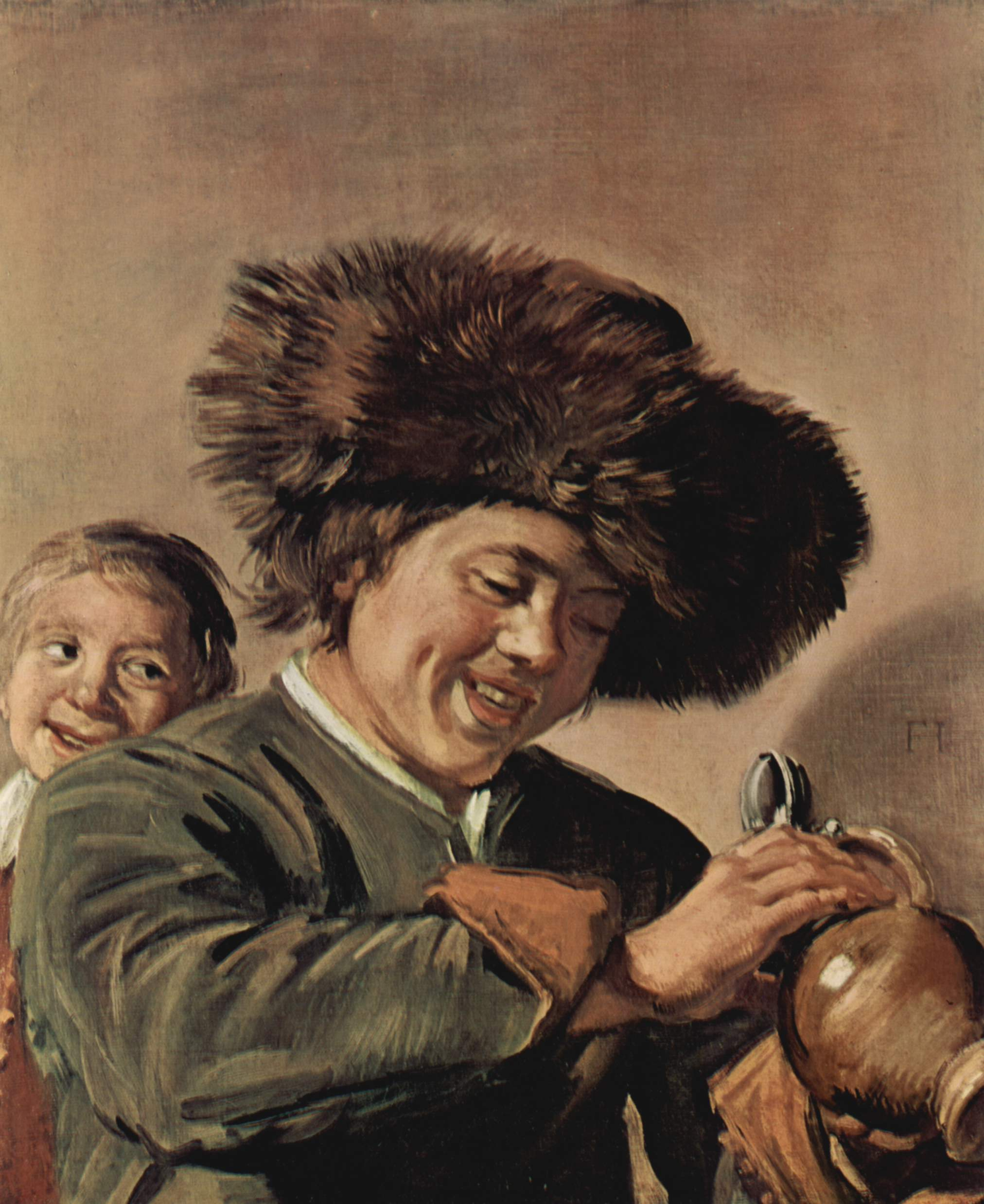
Two Laughing Boys with a Mug of Beer

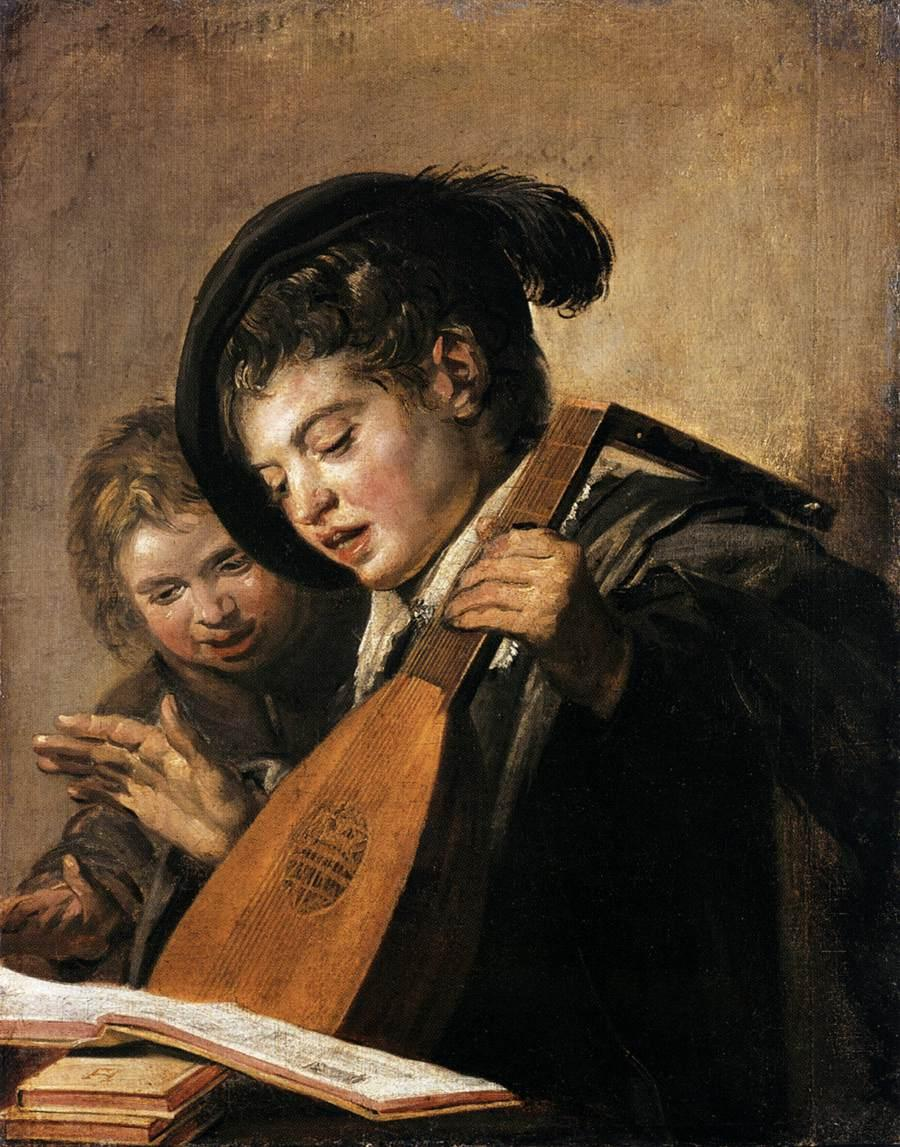
Two Boys Singing

Hals has included an accomplice peering over the central figure's shoulder, and besides the other two paintings already mentioned, this theme of a main subject with a secondary witness was common to many of his paintings of the 1620s; for example:

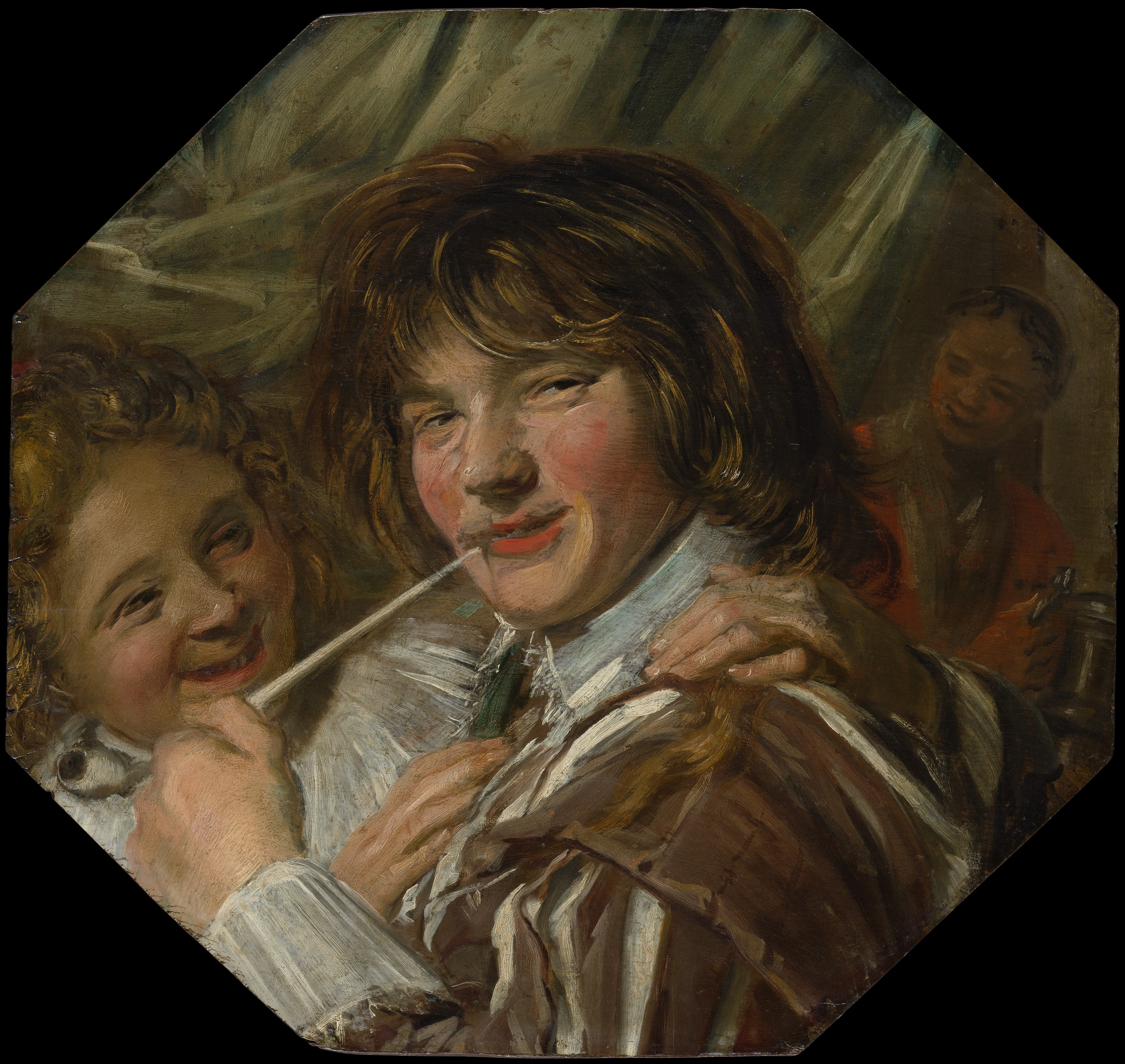
The Smoker, with an accomplice on the left and another in the background on the right

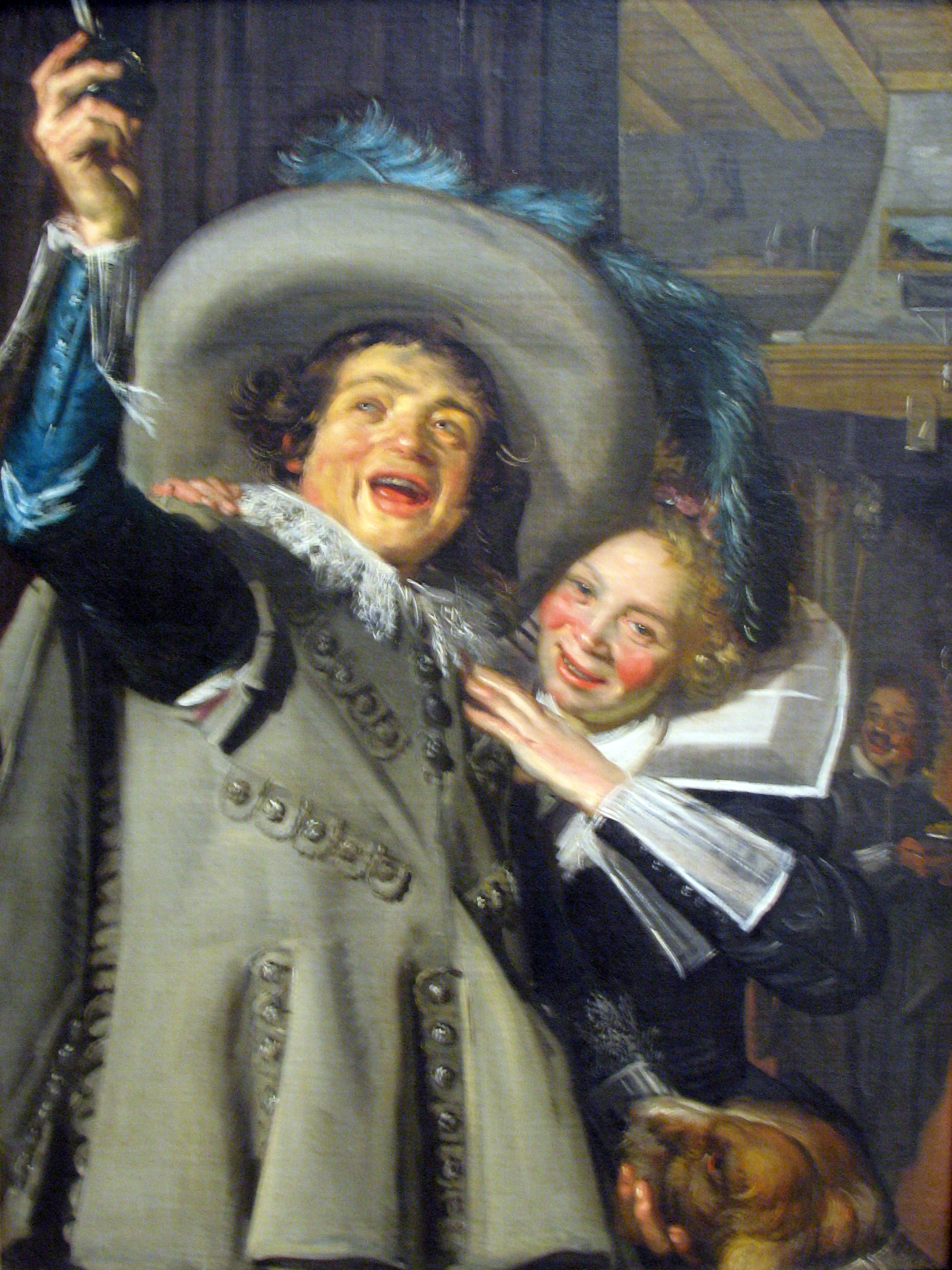
Yonker Ramp and his sweetheart, with an accomplice on the right

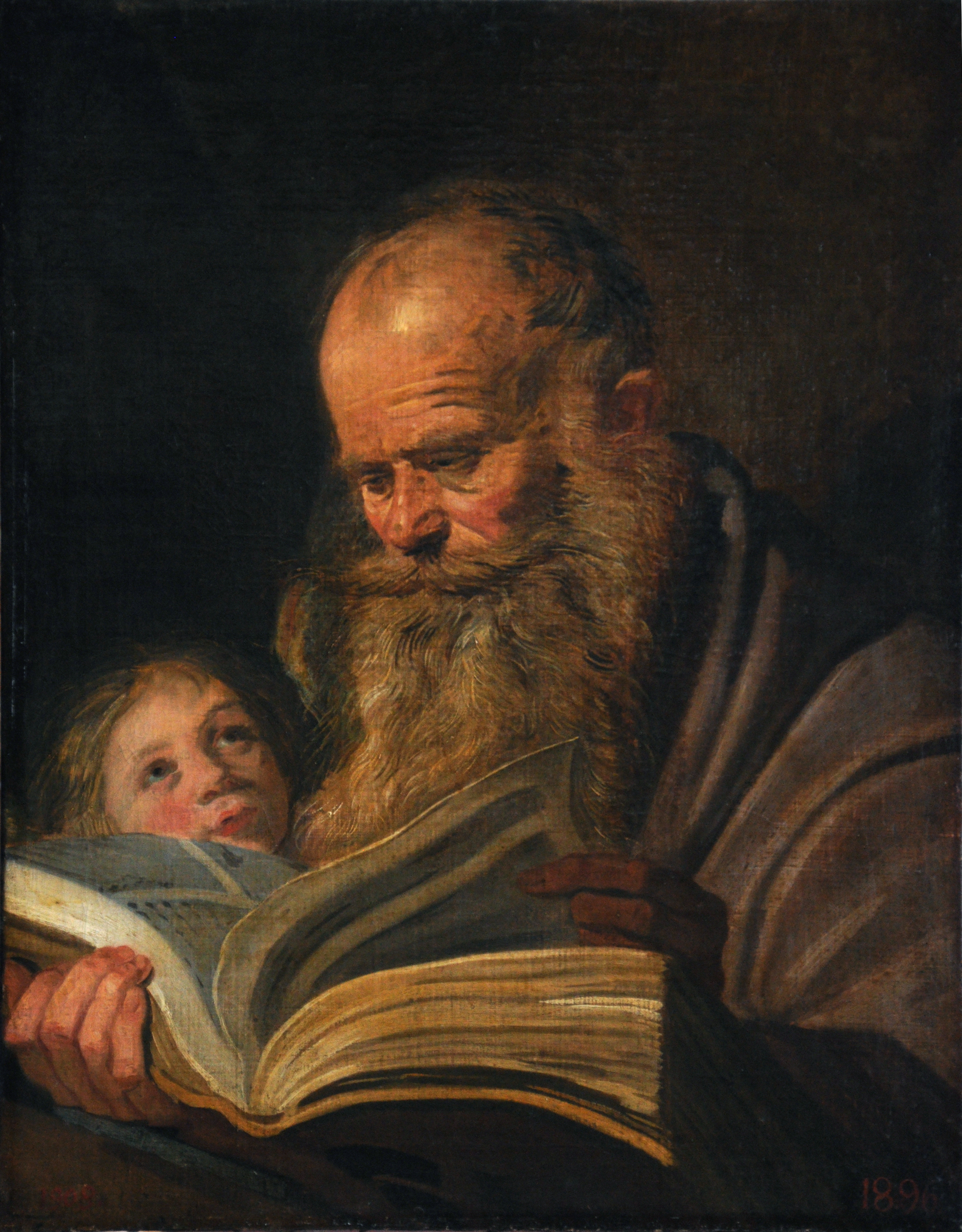
The evangelist Matthew and the angel, with an accomplice on the left

The theme of looking into a mug was also used by Hals when he painted the portrait of Peeckelhaeringh who turns to the viewer to show his mug.

== Thefts ==
The painting belongs to the Hofje van Mevrouw van Aerden museum. It has been stolen from the museum three times: in 1988, 2011, and 2020. One theory of why it is stolen so often is because the various theft attempts have defined its market value, making it easier to sell as stolen property.

In 1988, the facility manager was forced to turn off an alarm under threat of being shot. In 1991, it was returned after a ransom was paid, together with another painting called “Forest View with Flowering Elderberry”, by Jacob Salomonsz van Ruysdael, which had been stolen at the same time.

On 28 October 2011, it was recovered after being stolen for a second time on 27 April 2011.

The most recent theft was in late August 2020. In early April 2021, a person was arrested in the town of Baarn as a suspect. The person was also suspected of stealing a work by Vincent van Gogh called The Parsonage Garden at Nuenen, which was stolen from the Singer Laren museum in Laren in March 2020. Neither painting was recovered at that time. Art detective Arthur Brand told a reporter that the person in custody probably did not know the location of the works because "stolen artwork was often moved around quickly by criminal gangs".

A BBC News item stated the value of the Frans Hals painting to be "some €15m (£13m; $17.5m)" but provided no source for that information. An article in The Guardian the same day said the work "would be expected to fetch £13.4m at auction". On 24 September, the man was convicted of the thefts and sentenced to eight years imprisonment.

== See also ==
- List of paintings by Frans Hals
