= Laurens Craen =

Dutch painter

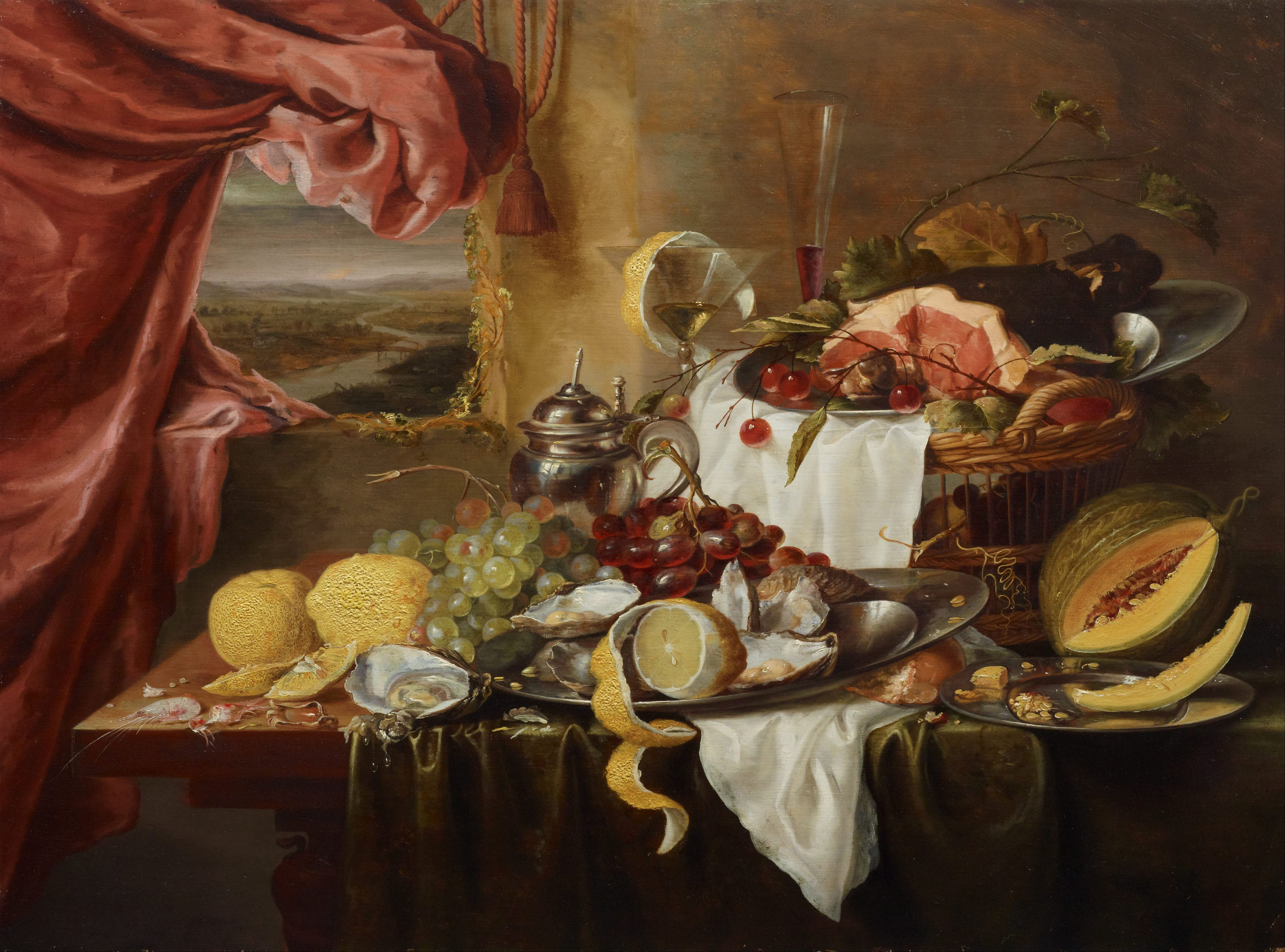
'Still Life with Imaginary View', oil on oak panel painting by Laurens Craen, c. 1645–50, Art Gallery of New South Wales

Laurens Craen (c. 1620 in The Hague – c.1670 in Middelburg), was a Dutch Golden Age still life painter. Laurens Craen was active between 1638 and 1664. He was possibly the son of Pieter Craen.

== Biography ==
Laurens Craen life and career is not as well known like his paintings that are well documented, a total of nineteen works are attributed to Craen. His name is mentioned in the archives of Middelburg, testifying that he was active there from 1655 till 1664. Craen was a member of the Guild of Saint Luke of Middelburg. He painted mainly in Middelburg (Zeeland), but was also active in Antwerp and The Hague. According to the RKD he was a fruit and flower still life painter from The Hague who was mentioned there in a letter to Constantijn Huygens and who later moved to Middelburg. His works show such a strong influence from Jan Davidsz de Heem that he is registered in Antwerp in 1645 and was possibly his pupil at that time. He became a member of the Middelburg Guild of St. Luke in 1654 and paid dues until 1663.

== Style ==
Laurens Craen made himself a name as a still life painter. He depicted often objects, food items, shell-fish, wine, vegetables and fruits arranged artistically, often objects that symbolized wealth and abundance, creating a voluptuous feast. His painting have an intimate and peaceful air. The paintings' details are painted with precision and virtuosity. By gradually toning down the shades, the skillfully and precisely depicted objects within the painting appear almost real, the metals look due to the reflected light shape are cold and the fruit and textiles soft. These painting were called pronkstilleven or sumptuous paintings in Dutch.

== Still Life with Imaginary View ==
In the painting Still Life with Imaginary View from circa 1645 the richness of the objects displayed attract the attention while the little window creates a contemplative illusion of distance. The painting example of pronkstilleven or sumptuous painting Shapes, colours and themes are echoed within the painting giving the composition both balance and dynamics. The elaborately depicted lemon peel is almost touchable, a structure in the structure. The wine transparent when catching the light, as well as the pomegranate seeds. The rich interplay of the total colour scheme in delicate shades creates a pleasing colour harmony.
