= Leerdam =

- City and former municipality
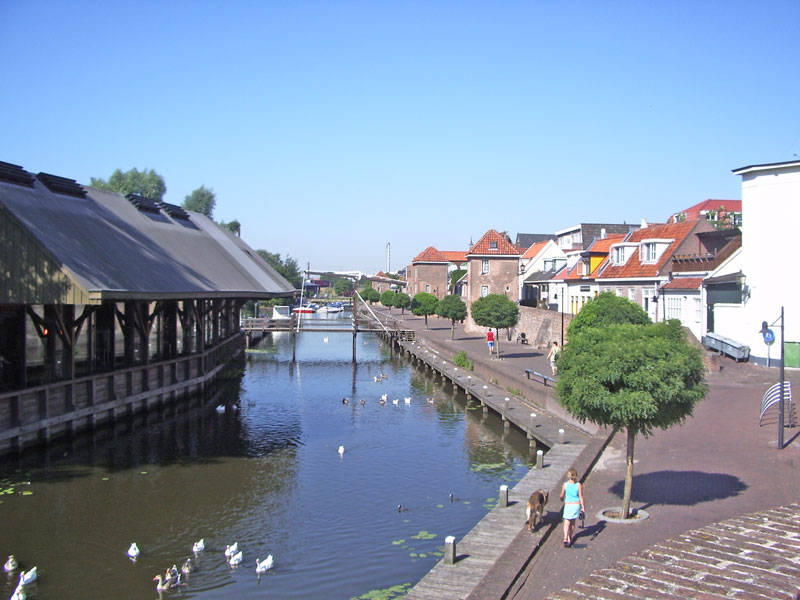
- City walls and Glass Centre

- Flag Coat of arms

- Location of the former municipality in South Holland
- Coordinates: 51°54′N 5°6′E
- Country: Netherlands
- Province: Utrecht
- Municipality: Vijfheerenlanden
- Merged: 2019

Population
  - Total: 21,000
- Demonym: Leerdammer
- Time zone: UTC+1 (CET)
  - Summer (DST): UTC+2 (CEST)
- Postcode: 4140–4145, 4163
- Area code: 0345

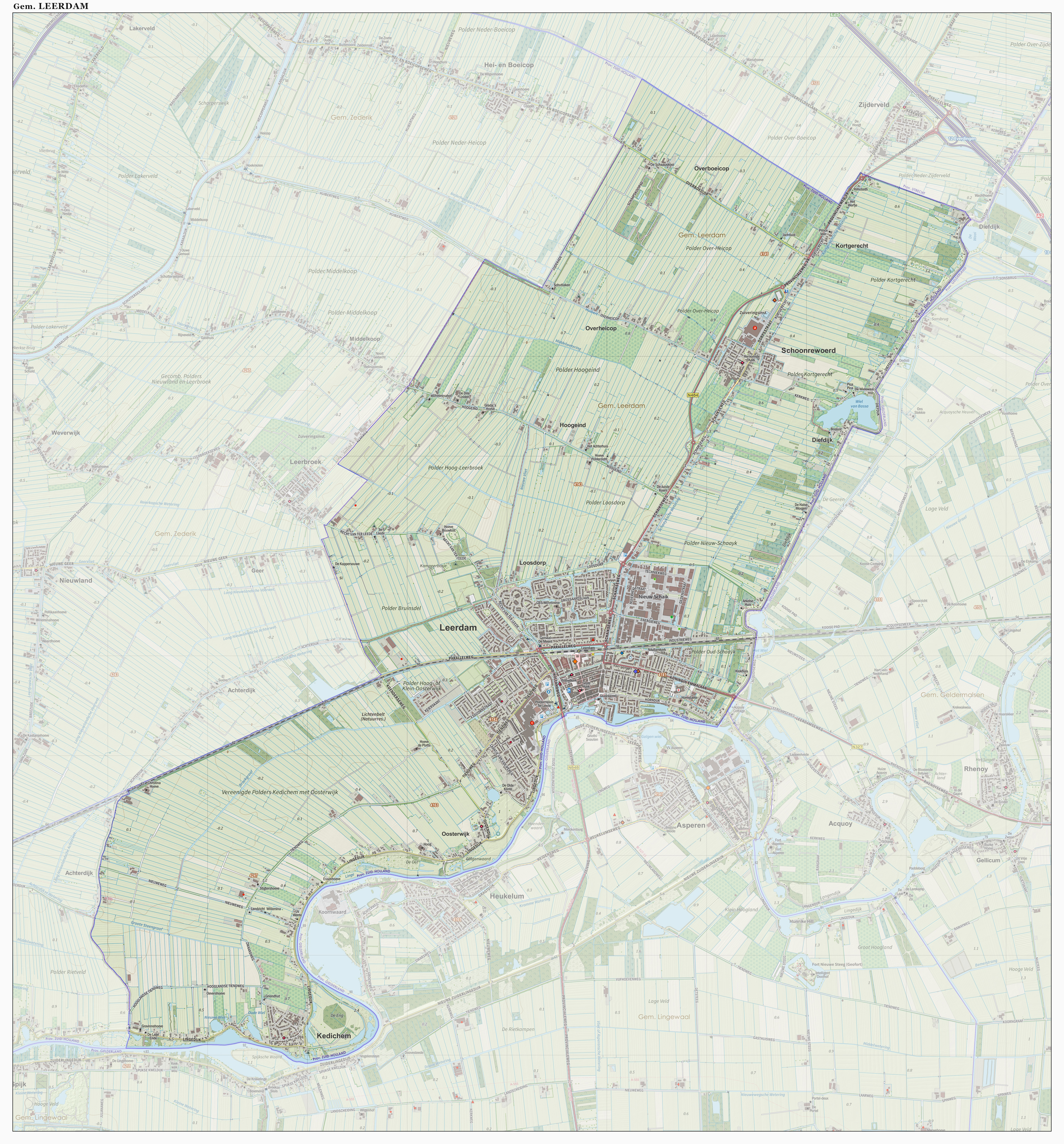
Dutch topographic map of the former municipality of Leerdam, June 2015

Leerdam (Dutch: [leːrˈdɑm]) is a city and former municipality in the western Netherlands, in the province of Utrecht. The municipality was merged with the municipalities of Vianen and Zederik on 1 January 2019. The name of the new municipality is Vijfheerenlanden which is a part of the province Utrecht. The former municipality Leerdam was a part of the province South Holland.

The south border of the town is formed by the river Linge. The name originates from a dam in the river Lede which was a branch from the river Linge towards Meerkerk. Leerdam is situated almost exactly in the middle of the three highways A2, A15, and A27.

== History ==
Leerdam received city rights in 1407. The small river Linge, bordered by beautiful water meadows, defines the atmosphere and tone of the landscape. Several centuries ago Leerdam formed a part of the Vijfheerenlanden domain, before it was raised to the level of County in 1498.

In 1551, Leerdam, together with Acquoy, became property of the House of Orange and part of the County of Holland.

The rich history of Leerdam can be found in well-kept historic buildings such as the Grote Kerk (Great Church), the Hofje van Mevrouw van Aerden (Mrs. Aerden Almshouses, now a museum), the remaining and restored city walls on the Zuidwal and the Oude Raadhuis (Old City Hall).

In South Africa a fort was built by the Dutch East India Company between 1666 and 1679 in the coastal city Cape Town. It is called Castle of Good Hope. The corners of this fort received names in honour of William of Orange-Nassau and because Leerdam was part of the House of Orange-Nassau one of those corners were named Leerdam.

== Gallery ==
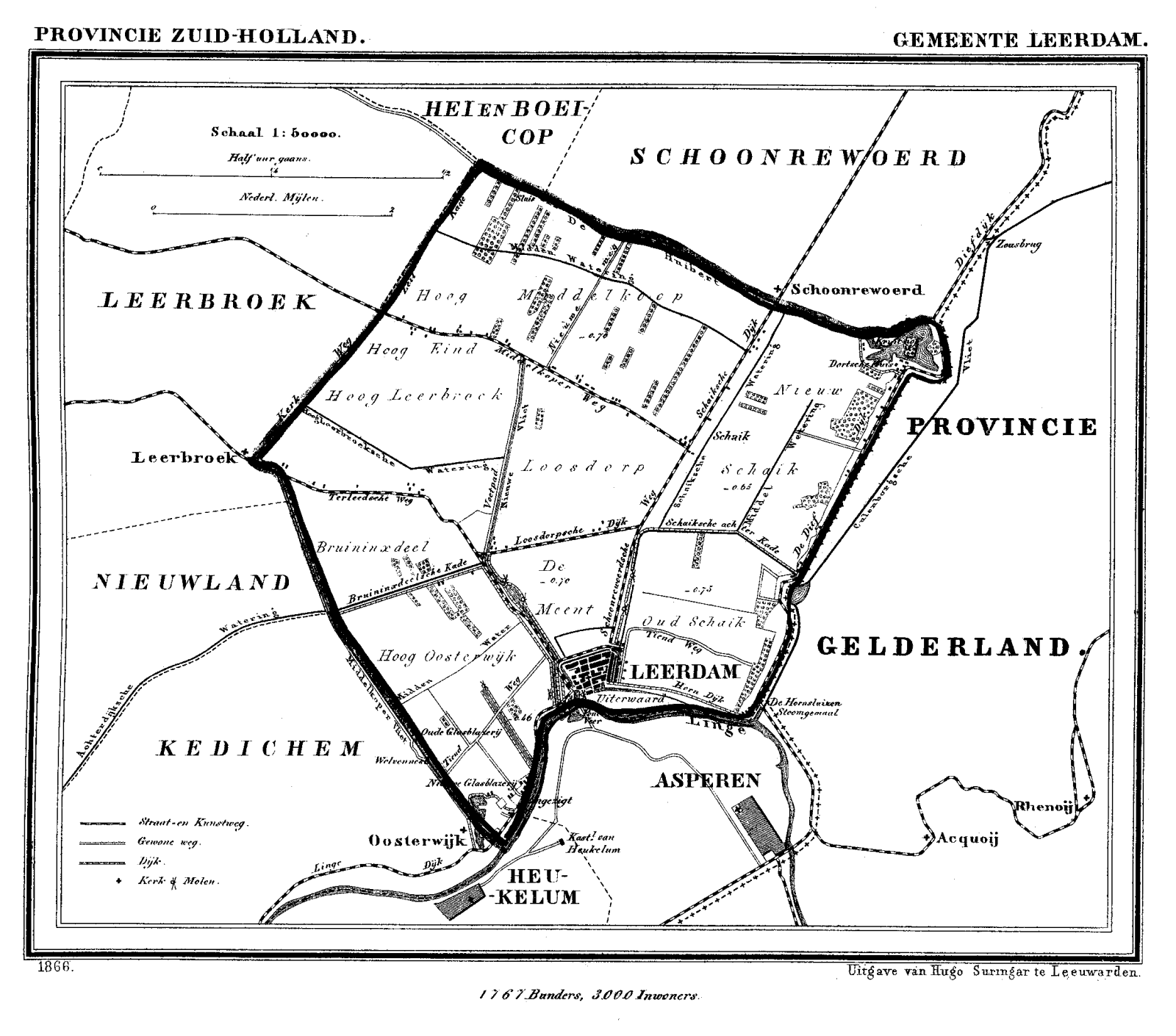
Leerdam in 1866.

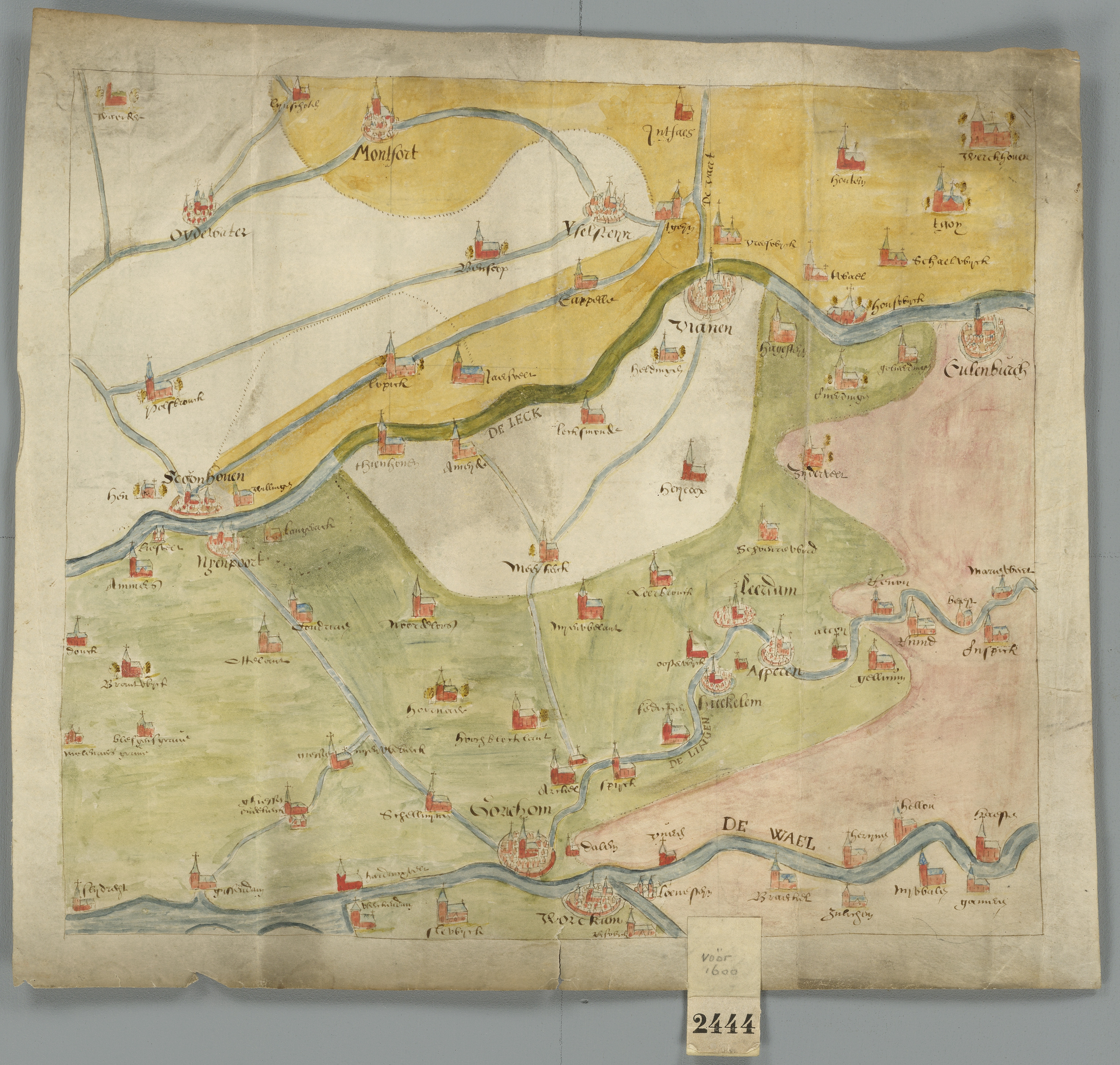
Historical map of the Vijfheerenlanden

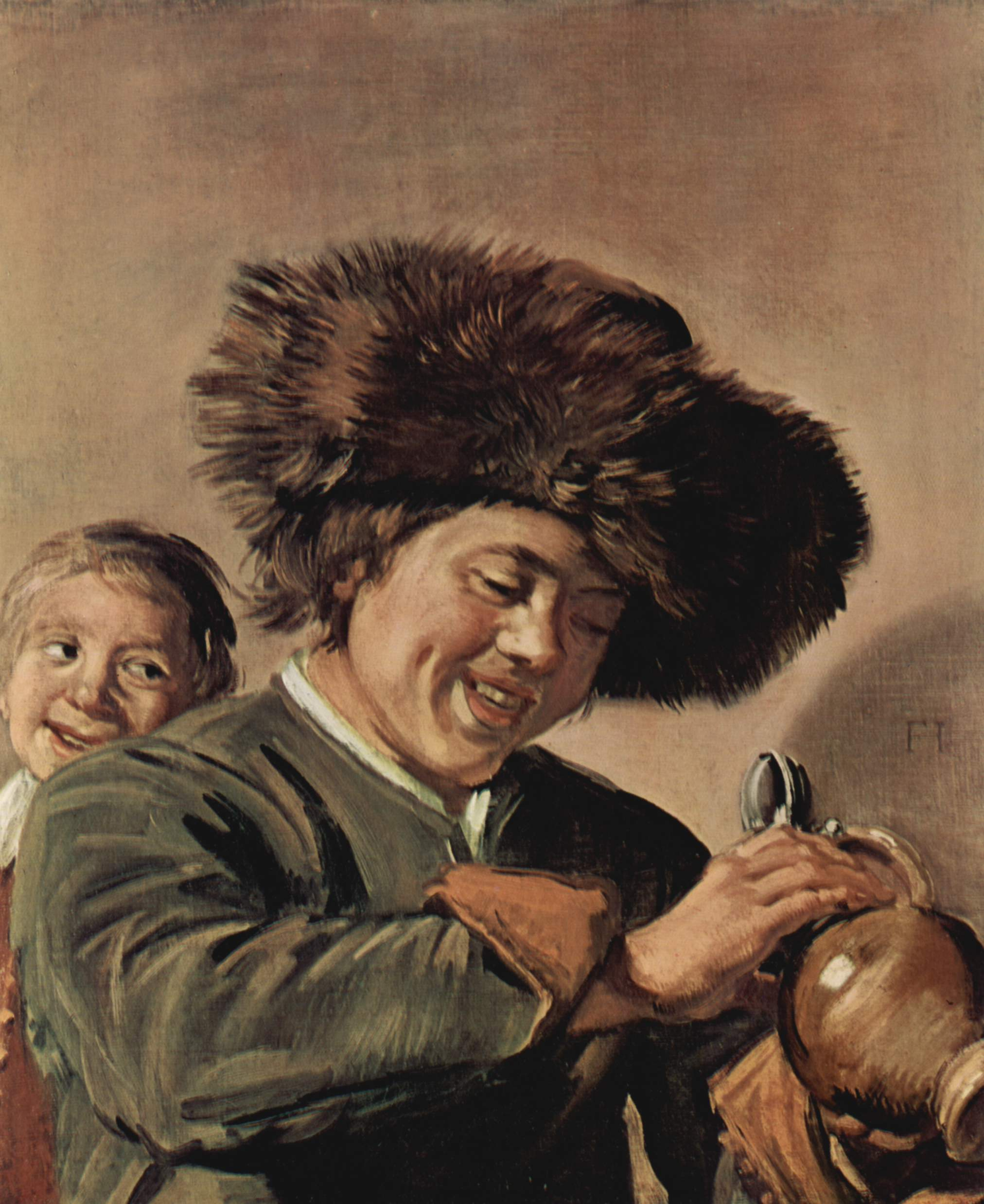
Two laughing boys with mug of beer by Frans Hals; Hofje van Mevrouw van Aerden, Leerdam

== Glass industry ==
Since the 18th century, the town's culture has been strongly influenced by the glass industry and the timber industry. The glass currently manufactured in Leerdam is internationally known as Royal Leerdam or (particularly in respect of designer glass and glass art) as Royal Leerdam Crystal. This, with the National Glass Museum, the Glass Centre (with its glassblowing and demonstration activities), and several art galleries, make Leerdam a major tourist attraction in the Netherlands.

Glassblowers work in the Glass Centre in Leerdam, which is open to the public.

== Cheese ==
The cheese Leerdammer is named after Leerdam, but is actually producted in Schoonrewoerd, located in the same municipality.

== Public transport ==
The Leerdam railway station is situated on the Elst–Dordrecht railway.

== Born in Leerdam ==
- Cornelis Pieter van den Hoek (1921–2015), resistance fighter during World War II
- Jan van Houwelingen (1939–2013), politician
- Manon van Rooijen (born 1982), freestyle swimmer
