= Nicolaes =

Nicolaes is a given name that is spelled Nicolaas in modern Dutch.

== Notable people ==
- Nicolaes Pieterszoon Berchem (1620–1683), Dutch Golden Age painter
- Nicolaes Boddingius (1605–1669), Dutch schoolmaster, writer and minister
- Nicolaes Borremans (c. 1614 – 1679), Dutch preacher
- Nicolaes Cave (fl 1619 – 1651), Flemish painter
- Nicolaes Coeckebacker (fl.1633–1639), Chief of the Dutch trading factory at Hirado, Japan
- Nicolaes Craen (fl.1500–1507), Flemish composer
- Nicolaes Hals (1628–1686), Dutch painter
- Nicolaes Couckebacker (1600s), Dutch factory chief
- Nicolaes Geelvinck (1706–1764), Dutch landowner and mayor of Amsterdam
- Nicolaes Gillis (1595–1632), Dutch painter
- Nicolaes Hals (1628–1686), Dutch painter
- Nicolaes Jonghelinck (1517–1570), Flemish merchant banker and art collector
- Nicolaes à Kempis (c.1600–1676), Flemish composer active in Brussels
- Nicolaes Lachtropius (1640–1700), Dutch painter
- Nicolaes Lastman (1585–1625), Dutch painter
- Nicolaes Latombe (1616–1676), Dutch painter
- Nicolaes Lauwers (1600–1652), Flemish engraver
- Nicolaes Maes (1634–1693), Dutch painter
- Nicolaes Millich (1629–1699), Dutch sculptor
- Nicolaes Molenaer (1630–1676), Dutch painter
- Nicolaes Moyaert (1592–1655), Dutch painter
- Nicolaes Pickenoy (1588 – 1653/1656), Dutch painter
- Nicolaes Pitau (1632–1671), Flemish-born French engraver and printmaker, son of Nicolaes Lauwers
- Nicolaes Roose, alias of Nicolaas de Liemaker (1601–1646), Flemish historical painter
- Nicolaes Ruts (1573–1638, German merchant
- Nicolaes Tulp (1593–1674), Dutch surgeon and politician
- Nicolaes Vallet (c.1583–c.1642), French-born Dutch lutenist and composer
- Nicolaes Visscher I (1618–1679), Dutch engraver and cartographer
- Nicolaes Visscher II (1649–1702), Dutch engraver and cartographer
- Nicolaes Willingh (1640–1678), Dutch painter
- Nicolaes Witsen (1641–1717), Dutch statesman, ambassador, cartographer and writer on shipbuilding
- Nicolaes Woutersz van der Meer (1575–1666), Dutch politician
- Nicolaes de Bruyn (1571–1656), Flemish engraver
- Nicolaes de Giselaer (1583–c.1654), Dutch painter
- Nicolaes de Helt Stockade (1614–1669), Dutch painter
- Nicolaes de Kemp (1574–1647), Dutch painter
- Nicolaes de Vree (1645–1702), Dutch painter
- Nicolaes van Gelder (1636–1676), Dutch painter
- Nicolaes van Hoorn (c.1635–1683), Dutch pirate
- Nicolaes van Rensselaer (1636–1678), Dutch clergyman in New Netherland
- Nicolaes van Verendael (1640–1691), Flemish painter

=== People portrayed by Frans Hals ===
- Nicolaes Pietersz Duyst van Voorhout (1599/1600–1650), Dutch brewer
- Nicolaes le Febure (1589–1641), Dutch mayor of Haarlem
- Nicolaes Grisz Grauwert (1582–1658), Dutch guard
- Nicolaes Hasselaer (1593–1635), Dutch brewer
- Nicolaes van Loo (1607–1641), Dutch brewer
- Nicolaes Woutersz van der Meer (1575–1666), Dutch brewer and mayor of Haarlem
- Nicolaes Olycan (1599–1639), Dutch brewer
- Nicolaes Verbeek (1582–1637), Dutch brewer

== See also ==
- Nicolaas
- Nicolaos Matussis
- Nicolas
