= Pieter van Bronckhorst =

Dutch painter

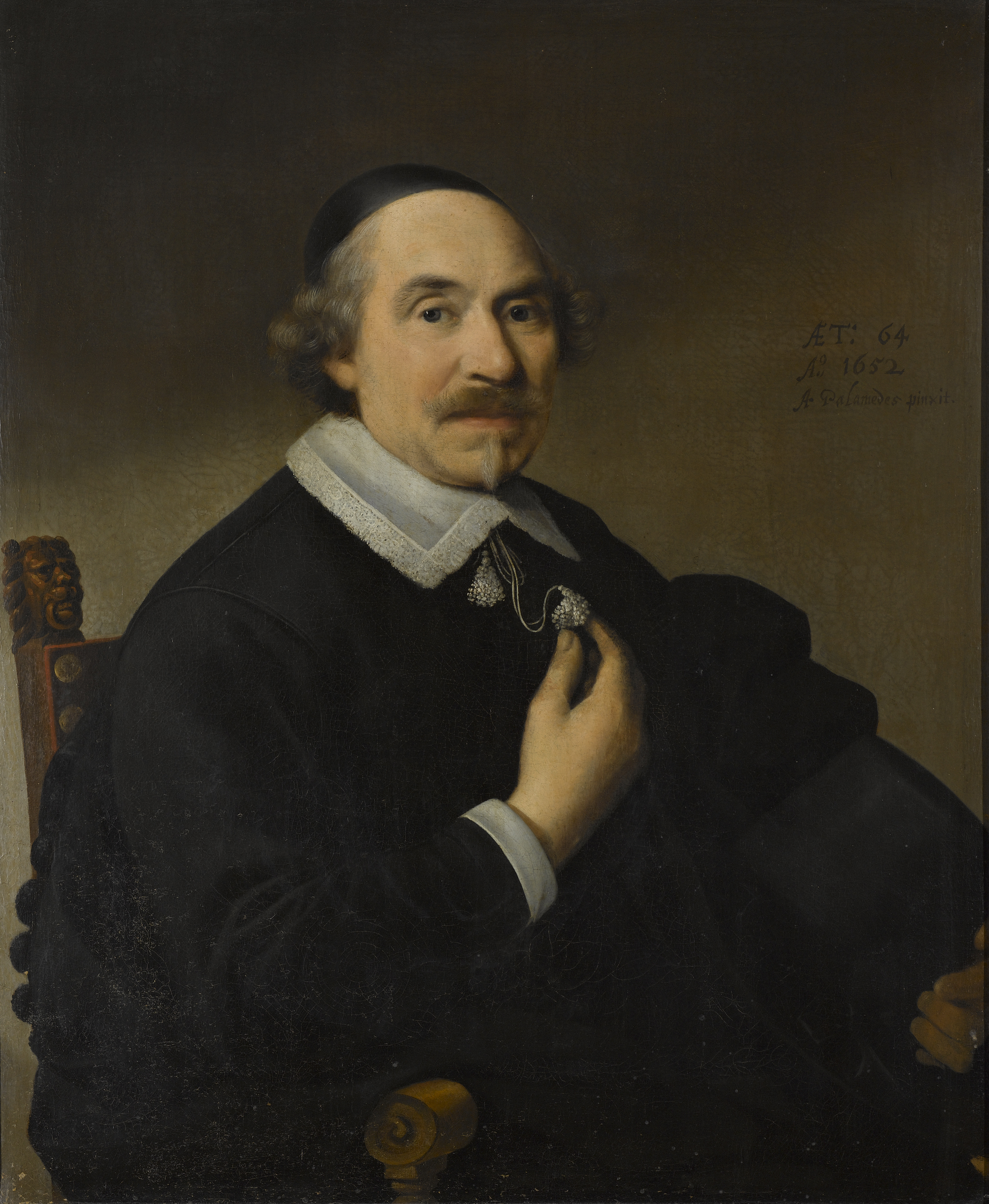
- Presumed portrait of van Bronckhorst by Anthonie Palamedesz., 1652
- Born: 16 May 1588; Delft, Dutch Republic
- Died: 21 June 1661 (aged 73); Delft
- Occupation: Painter

Pieter Anthonisz van Bronckhorst or Bronkhorst (16 May 1588 – 21 June 1661), was a Dutch painter active in Delft. He was mainly an architectural painter known for his church interiors and fantasy palaces with small figures representing biblical stories. It is possible he also painted still lifes and was a staffage painter for other painters.

== Life ==
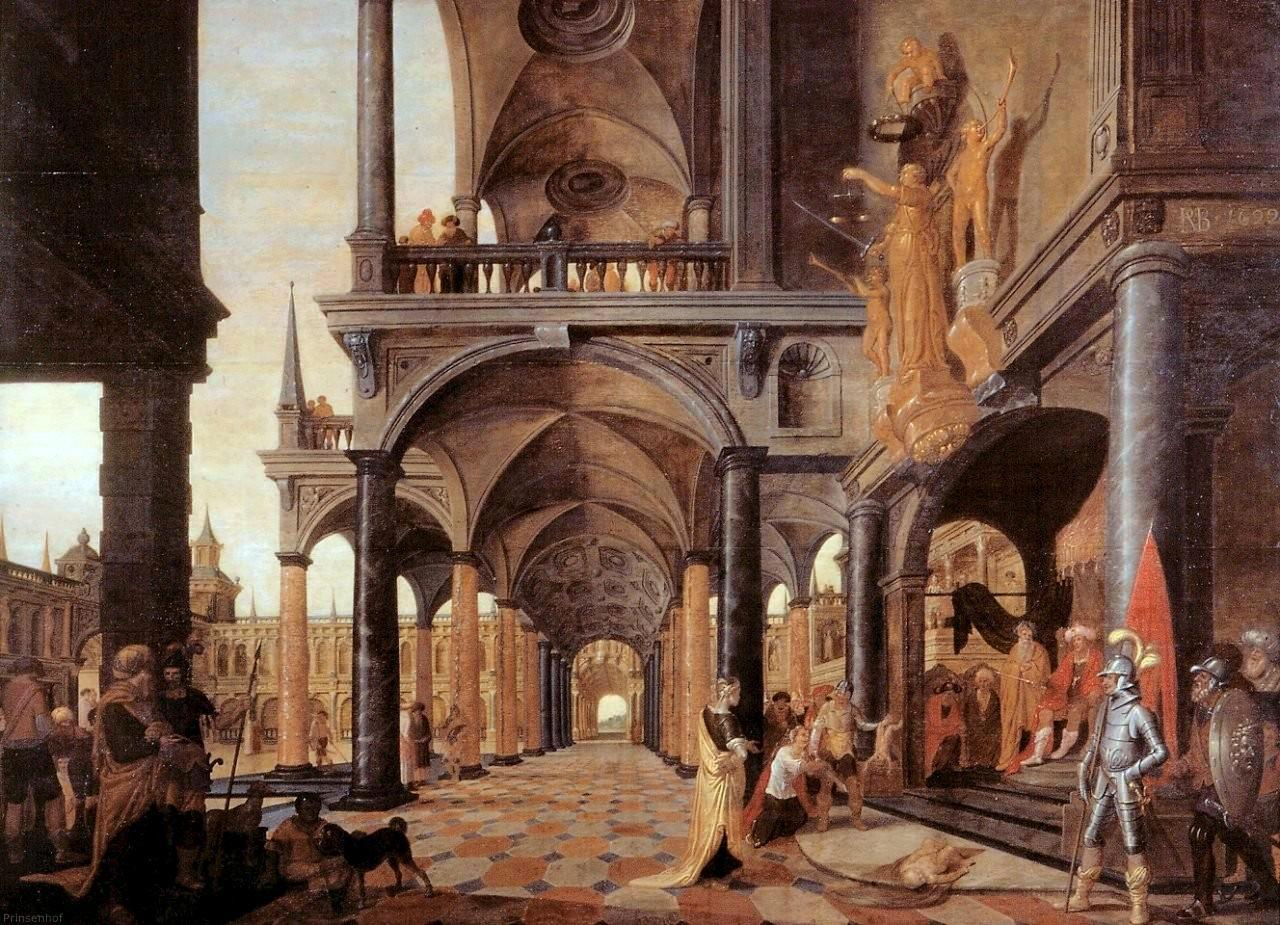
Judgment of Solomon, 1622

Details on his life are scarce. He was born on 16 May 1588 in Delft as the son of Anthonis Pieters (van Bronckhorst), a tailor, and Machteld Dirxdr. van Coolwijk. His master(s) are not known but it is likely that he studied painting in Delft. He visited France in his youth to study perspective painting. He had returned by 1609. He was one of the co-founders of the Guild of Saint Luke of Delft in 1613 and was its headman in 1655-1656.

On 5 October 1614 he married in Delft Jacobmina Nicolaesdr. de Grebber (died 1666), daughter of the prominent goldsmith Nicolaes Adriaensz. de Grebber. Around 1652 fellow Delft painter Anthonie Palamedesz. painted the couple's double portraits. The couple had three children: Machtelijna Pieters (died 1682), Claes Pietersz. (1617-1656) and Maria (1631-1708). His son Claes Pietersz. also became a painter.

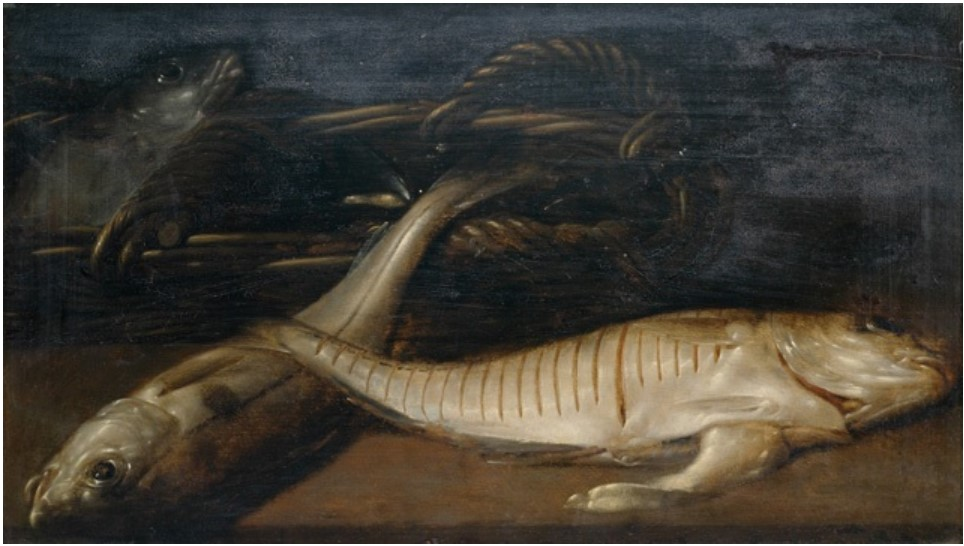
Fish and a basket of mussels on a table

He was possibly the teacher of the architectural painter Dirck van Delen.

He died in Delft on 21 June 1661 and was buried in the Nieuwe Kerk in Delft.

== Work ==
He was known for his architectural paintings. He used the monogram PVB (entwined) to sign his paintings. He painted the interiors of churches, temples and palaces, which he ornamented with small figures representing historical subjects. Examples are the two large pictures he painted for the City Hall of Delft: the Christ driving the Money-changers out of the Temple and the Judgment of Solomon (now in Museum Het Prinsenhof in Delft).

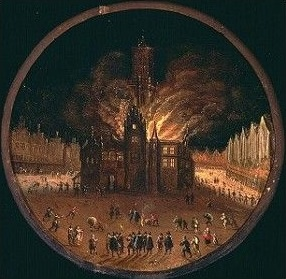
Fire at the City Hall of Delft of 4 March 1618

He painted the latter work in 1620 or 1622 on a commission from the Vierschaar, the local tribunal which had its seat in the Delft City Hall, which had been rebuilt after a fire in 1618. The bible story of the judgement of Solomon was often used to illustrate the kind of wisdom judges are required to possess. The story recounts how two women had a child at the same time and in the same house. One child died after which both women claimed to be the mother of the living child. When King Solomon was hearing the court case brought by the women, he ordered a soldier to cut the child in half, stating that in that manner each mother would receive an equal share of the child. Thereupon one of the women fell on her knees and begged that the other woman should be given the child, so that the child's life would be spared. Solomon then determined that the real mother was this woman and ordered the child to be given to her. The scene is set in a sumptuous renaissance palace, which may be a reference to the new city hall of Leiden. He has thus placed the biblical story in contemporary Leiden.

His architectural works show the influence of leading perspective painter Hans Vredeman de Vries and the Flemish artist Hendrick Aerts. The latter's only known church interior had been engraved in Delft by Flemish emigré printmaker Jan van Londerseel.

He may have also practised as a still life painter. A fish still life on the German art market in 2001 was signed P. van Bronchorst.

He may have painted the staffage (figures) in the works of landscape painters, such as Pieter Stael.
