= Nicolaas =

Nicolaas is the Dutch equivalent of the masculine given name Nicholas. Before the 19th century the name was also written Nicolaes, while Nikolaas is an uncommon variant spelling. Most people with the name use a short form in daily life, like Claas, Claes, Klaas, Nico, and Niek.

Notable people with the name Nicolaas or Nikolaas include:

== Academics ==
- Nicolaas Bidloo (1673–1735), Dutch personal physician to Tsar Peter the Great
- Nicolaas Bloembergen (1920–2017), Dutch-American physicist and Nobel laureate
- Nicolaas Bom (born 1937), Dutch electrical engineer
- Nicolaas H. J. van den Boogaard (1938–1982), Dutch medievalist scholar
- Nicolaas Govert de Bruijn (1918–2012), Dutch mathematician
- Nicolaas Laurens Burman (1734–1793), Dutch botanist
- Nicolaas Duneas (born c. 1972), South African biotech entrepreneur
- Nicolaas Everaerts (1461–1532), Dutch jurist
- Nicolaas Hartsoeker (1656–1725), Dutch mathematician, physicist, and microscopist
- Nicolaas Heinsius the Elder (1620–1681), Dutch classical scholar and poet
- Nicolaas Heinsius the Younger (1656–1718), Dutch physician and writer
- Nicolaas Marinus Hugenholtz (1924–2026), Dutch physicist
- Nicolaas Godfried van Kampen (1921–2013), Dutch theoretical physicist
- Nicolaas Kruik (1678–1754), Dutch land surveyor, cartographer, astronomer and weatherman known as Cruquius
- Nicolaas Kuiper (1920–1994), Dutch mathematician
- Nicolaas Meerburgh (1734–1814), Dutch botanist and botanical garden director
- Nicolaas des Muliers (1564–1630), Flemish-born Dutch physician and astronomer known as Mulerius
- Nicolaas Nagelkerke (born 1951), Dutch biostatistician and epidemiologist
- Nicolaas M.M. Nibbering (1938–2014), Dutch chemist and mass spectrometrist
- Nicolaas Wilhelmus Posthumus (1880–1960), Dutch economic historian and political scientist
- Nicolaas J.M. Roozen (born 1953), Dutch economist
- Nicolaas Adrianus Rupke (born 1944), Dutch historian of science
- Nicolaas Stenius (1605–1670), Dutch theologian portrayed by Frans Hals
- Nicolaas Jan van Strien (1946–2008), Dutch zoologist and conservationist
- Nikolaas Tinbergen (1907–1988), Dutch biologist and ornithologist and Nobel Laureate
- Nicolaas van Wijk (1880–1941), Dutch linguist and slavist

== Arts ==
- Nicolaas Bastert (1854–1939), Dutch landscape painter
- Nicolaas Baur (1767–1820), Dutch marine painter
- Nicolaas van Eyck (1617–1679), Flemish painter
- Nikolaas van Hoy (1631–1679), Flemish painter active in Austria
- Nicolaas Wilhelm Jungmann (1872–1935), Dutch-English painter and illustrator
- Nicolaas de Liemaecker (1601–1646), Flemish historical painter
- Nicolaas Piemont (1644–1709), Dutch landscape painter
- Nicolaas Pieneman (1809–1860), Dutch painter, art collector, lithographer, and sculptor
- Nicolaas Pieneman (1880-1938), Dutch painter
- Nicolaas Regnier (1591–1667), Flemish painter and art collector
- Nicolaas Johannes Roosenboom (1843–1896), Dutch landscape painter
- Nicolaas Roosendael (1634–1686), Dutch painter
- Nicolaas Rubens, Lord of Rameyen (1618–1655), Flemish son of the painter Peter Paul Rubens
- Nicolaas Verkolje (1673–1746), Dutch painter and mezzotint maker
- Nicolaas van der Waay (1855–1936), Dutch decorative artist, watercolorist and lithographer

== Music ==
- Nicolaas Cornelius Carstens (1926–2016), South African accordionist and songwriter
- Nicolaas Dijkshoorn (born 1960), Dutch musician and writer
- Nicolaas Douwman (born 1982), Dutch DJ, record producer and songwriter
- Nicolaas Maria Schilder (born 1983), Dutch singer-songwriter

== Politics ==
- Nicolaas Cupérus (1842–1928), Belgian politician and promoter of gymnastics
- Nicolaas Debrot (1902–1981), Dutch writer and Governor of the Netherlands Antilles
- Nicolaas Diederichs (1903–1978), State President and Finance Minister of South Africa
- Nicolaas Geelvinck (1732–1787), President of the Dutch West India Company
- Nicolaas Havenga (1882–1957), South African Finance Minister
- Nicolaas Jouwe (1923–2017), Papuan leader, first president of West New Guinea
- Nicolaas Pierson (1839–1909), Dutch economist and Prime Minister of the Netherlands
- Nicolaas II Rockox (1560–1640), Flemish knight, mayor of Antwerp
- Nicolaas Smit (1837–1896), South African Boer general and politician
- Nicolaas Steelink (1890–1989), Dutch American labor activist
- Nicolaas Verburg (c.1620–1676), Dutch Governor of Formosa and Director General of the VOC council in Batavia
- Nicolaas Frederic de Waal (1853–1932), Dutch-born Administrator of Cape Province, South Africa
- Nicolaas Waterboer (1819–1896), South African leader of the Griqua people
- Nicolaas Jacobus de Wet (1873–1960), South African Chief Justice and Governor-General

== Religion ==
- Nicolaas Goudanus (1517–1565), Dutch Jesuit and papal diplomat
- Nicolaas Grevinckhoven (died 1632), Dutch Protestant (Remonstrant) minister
- Nicolaas Godfried van Kampen (1776–1839), Dutch Mennonite author and deacon
- Nicolaas van Nieuwland (1510–1580), Dutch bishop of Haarlem and abbot of Egmond Abbey
- Nicolaas Pieck (1534–1572), Dutch Franciscan friar
- Nicolaas Johannes Smith (1929–2010), South African minister and apartheid opponent

== Sports ==
- Nicolaas Jan Jerôme Bouvy (1892–1957), Dutch footballer
- Nicolaas A.P. de Bree (1944–2016), Dutch footballer
- Nicolaas G.M. van den Broek (born 1955), Dutch ice hockey player
- Nicolaas Broekhuijsen (1876–1958), Dutch teacher, inventor of korfball
- Nicolaas Buchly (1910–1965), Dutch track cyclist
- Nicolaas R.J. Buwalda (1890–1970), Dutch footballer
- Nicolaas Pieter Claesen (born 1962), Belgian footballer
- Nicolaas Cortlever (1915–1995), Dutch chess master
- Nikolaas Davin (born 1997), Namibian cricketer
- Nicolaas Driebergen (born 1987), Dutch swimmer
- Nicolaas Holzken (born 1983), Dutch kickboxer and boxer
- Nicolaas van Hoorn (1904–1946), Dutch fencer
- Nicolaas Immelman (born 1993), South African rugby player
- Nicolaas Jacobs (born 1981), Namibian wrestler
- Nicolaas Janse van Rensburg (born 1994), South African rugby player
- Nicolaas de Jong (1887–1966), Dutch cyclist
- Nicolaas Pieter de Jong (born 1942), Dutch sailor
- Nicolaas Landeweerd (born 1954), Dutch water polo player
- Nicolaas Jacobus Lee (born 1994), South African rugby player
- Nicolaas "Moos" Linneman (1931–2020), Dutch boxer
- Nicolaas Bernardus Lutkeveld (1916–1997), Dutch javelin thrower
- Nicolaas Johannes Luus (born 1977), South African rugby player
- Nicolaas Meiring (born 1933), South African swimmer
- Nicolaas Johannes Michel (1912–1971), Dutch footballer
- Nicolaas Moerloos (1900–1944), Belgian gymnast and weightlifter
- Nicolaas Nederpeld (1886–1969), Dutch fencer
- Nicolaas Pretorius (born 1984), South African rugby player
- Nicolaas Pretorius (born 1989), South African cricketer
- Nicolaas Hessel Rienks (born 1962), Dutch rower
- Nicolaas Scholtz (cricketer) (born 1986), Namibian cricketer
- Nicolaas Scholtz (born 1991), South African tennis player
- Nicolaas Bernard Spits (born 1943), Dutch field hockey player
- Nicolaas J.S. Steyn (born 1985), South African rugby player
- Nicolaas Tates (1915–1990), Dutch canoeist
- Nicolaas Theunissen (1867–1929), South African cricketer
- Nicolaas Peter Vanos (1963–1987), American basketball player
- Nicolaas C.M. Verhoeven (born 1961), Dutch cyclist
- Nicolaas de Wolf (1887–1967), Dutch footballer
- Nicolaas Wolmarans (1916–1994), South African boxer

== Writers ==
- Nicolaas Beets (1814–1903), Dutch theologian, writer and poet
- Nicolaas Matsier (born 1945), Dutch novelist
- Nicolaas Thomas Bernhard (1931–1989), Austrian novelist, playwright and poet
- Nicolaas Vergunst (born 1958), South African novelist
- Nicolaas Petrus van Wyk Louw (1906–1970), Afrikaans-language poet, playwright and scholar

== Other ==
- Nicolaas Henneman (1813–1898), Dutch photographer active in London
- Nicolaas Nieuwoudt (1929–1989), South African military commander
- Nicolaas van Rensburg (1864–1926), South African Boer and prophet
- Nicolaas van Staphorst (1742–1801), Dutch banker
- Nicolaas Zannekin (died 1328), Flemish peasant revolutionary leader

== See also ==
- Nicolaes
- Nicolaos Matussis
- Nicolas
