= Dirck van Delen =

Dutch painter

- Born: Dirck Christiaensz van Delen; 1605; Heusden, Dutch Republic
- Died: May 16, 1671 (aged 65–66); Middelburg, Dutch Republic
- Occupation: Painter
- Writing career
- Period: Dutch Golden Age
- Subject: Architecture

Dirck van Delen or Dirck Christiaensz van Delen (c. 1605 – 16 May 1671) was a Dutch painter who specialized exclusively in architectural paintings, principally depicting palace perspectives and church interiors.

== Life ==
Van Delen was born in Heusden. It is not clear with whom he apprenticed. Art historian have proposed both Frans Hals and Hendrick Aerts (who also specialized in architectural paintings) as his presumed masters. More plausible are studies under Pieter van Bronckhorst and/or Bartholomeus van Bassen in Delft. The influence of Hendrick Aerts could have reached van Delen in this manner. An apprenticeship in Delft would also explain why Anthonie Palamedesz. was able to provide the figures in works by van Delen as witnessed by co-signed examples.

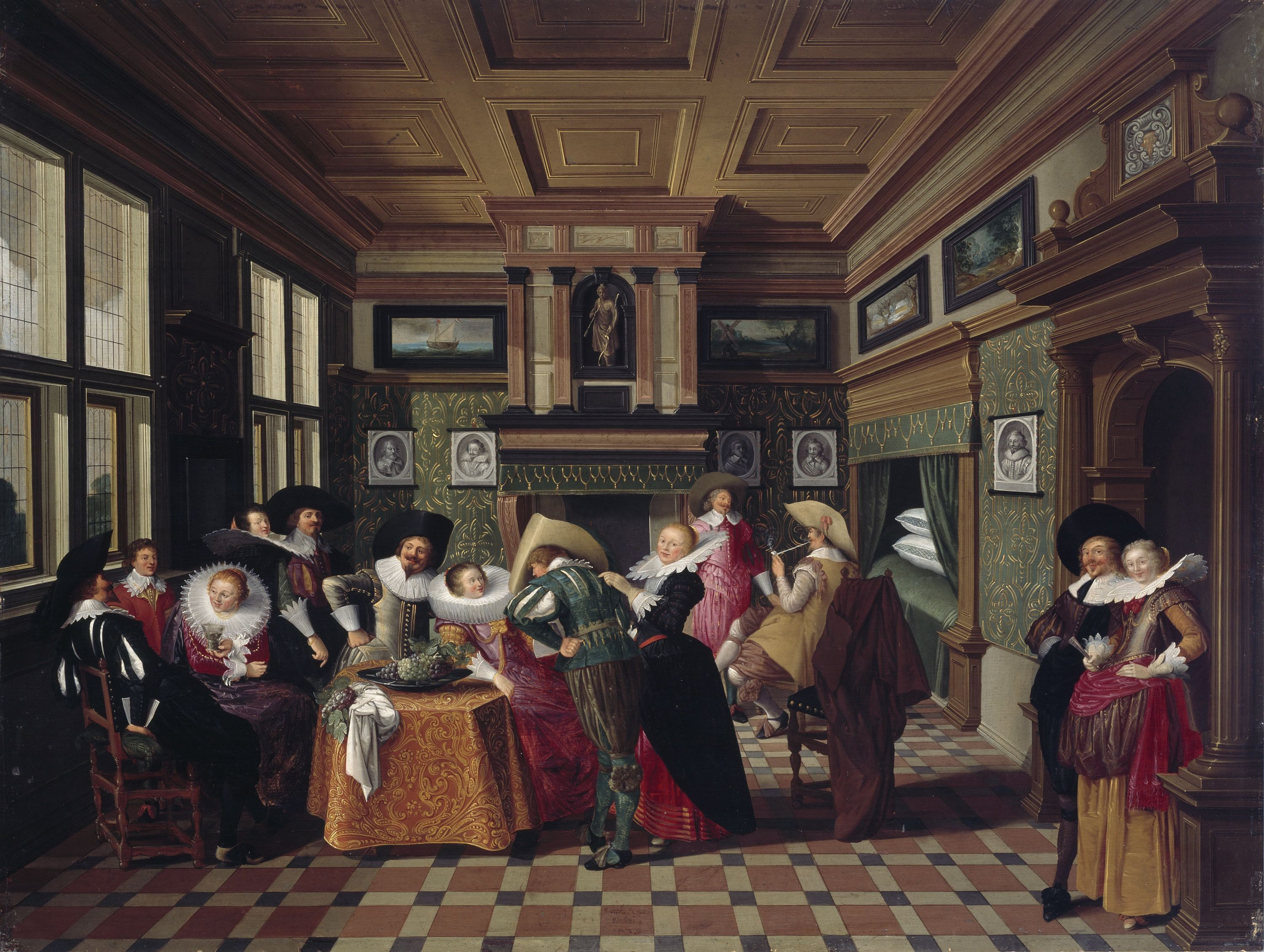
Interior with Ladies and Cavalier, 1629

Shortly after he was born, his parents moved to Breda. He married in Middelburg in 1625. In 1626 he moved to Zeeland and became master of the toll house in Arnemuiden. From that year until his death he was registered in Arnemuiden where he sat on the town council, most of the time as burgomaster. He was a member of the Middelburg Guild of St. Luke from 1639 until 1665. In 1666 he gave to the Antwerp Chamber of rhetoric Olyftack a painting, which he had made in collaboration with the painter Theodoor Boeyermans. Two years later he became a member of the Olyftack.

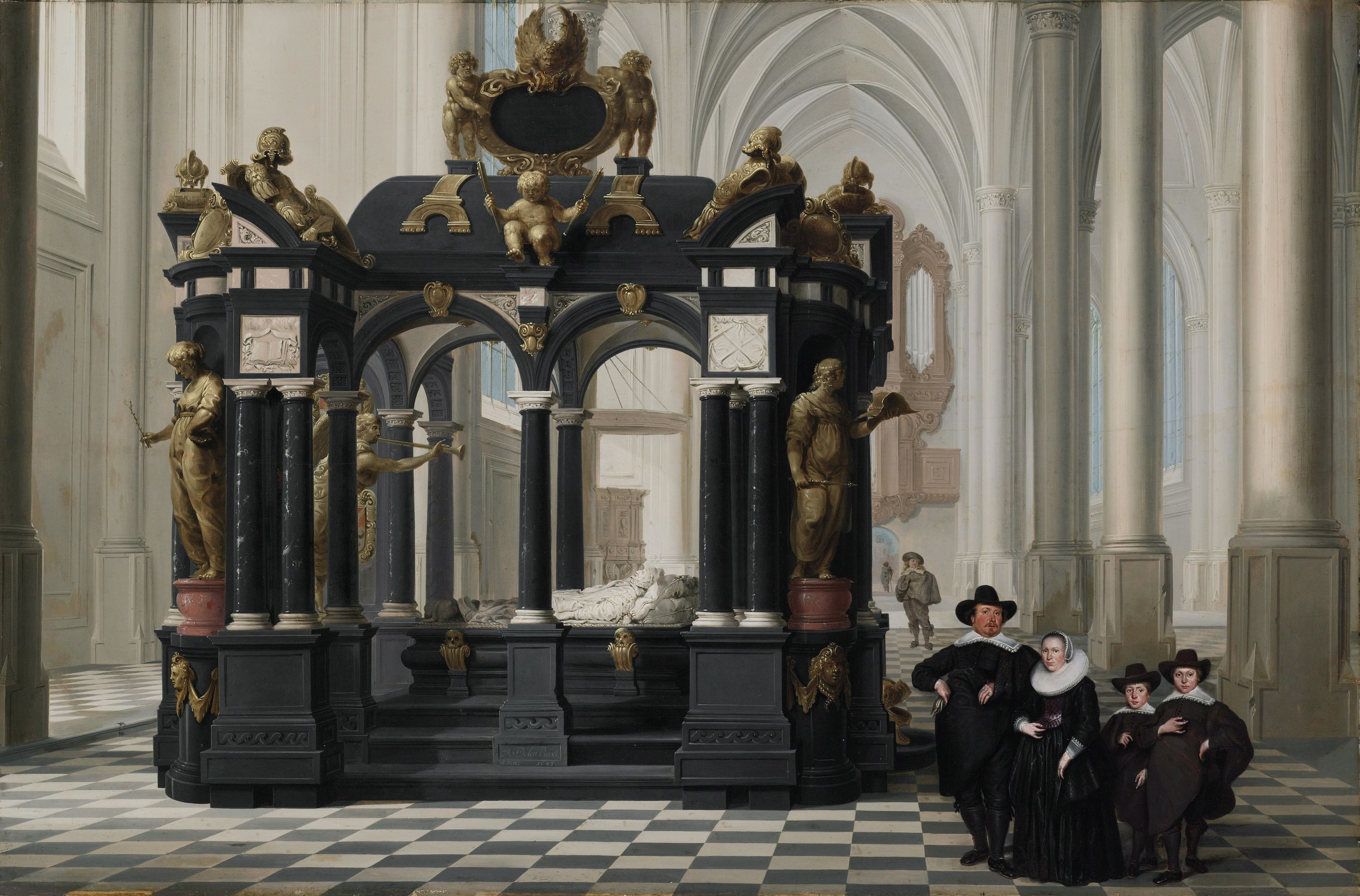
Conversation outside a Castle, 1636

His relative renown is evidenced by the fact that in the early 1630s van Delen received a commission to paint five large canvases (four of which are about 3.1 meters high) that were installed in a house in The Hague that was owned by Count Floris II van Pallandt van Culemborg.

His pupils included Daniël de Blieck and Hans Jurriaensz. van Baden.

He was widowed three times and had at least one son, but none of his children survived him.

== Work ==
=== General ===
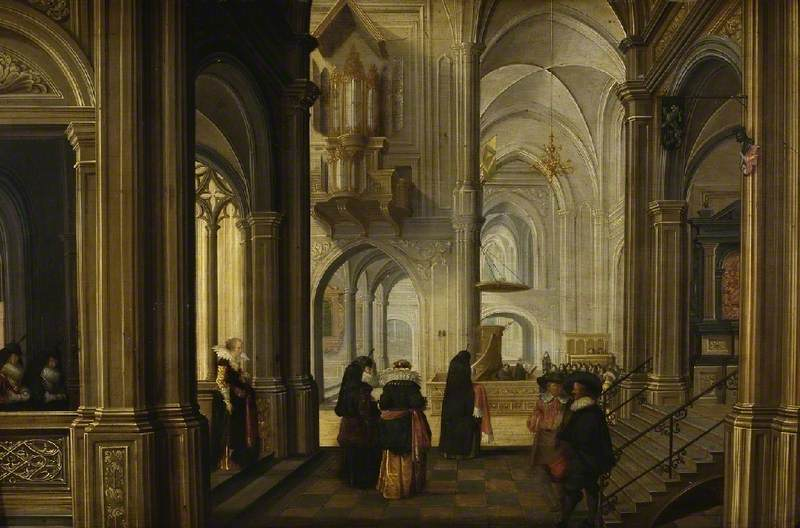
Interior of a Church, 1628

Van Delen's work consists almost entirely of architectural paintings of imaginary palaces and church interiors. A single flower still life by his hand is known (formerly in the Museum Boijmans van Beuningen. His earliest paintings of palace scenes were influenced significantly by the work of Hans Vredeman de Vries and his son Paul Vredeman de Vries.

He also produced some intimate interiors with genre scenes. Examples are the A Musical Company in a Renaissance Hall, a collaboration with Pieter Codde (1636, Museum Boijmans Van Beuningen) and the Interior with Ladies and Cavalier, with figures copied after Dirck Hals (1629, National Gallery of Ireland). In these painting he emphasizes the walls and their panelling. Through his regular presence in Antwerp van Delen likely had an important influence on succeeding architectural painters in Antwerp.

In his church interiors van Delen initially revealed the influence of the paintings made by the Flemish architectural painter Hendrick Aerts after the architectural prints of Jan van Londerseel. He may also have drawn inspiration for his gothicizing church architecture from Antwerp architectural painters, although he did not adopt their rigid tunnel perspective. His church interiors are in style also close to those of Bartholomeus van Bassen.

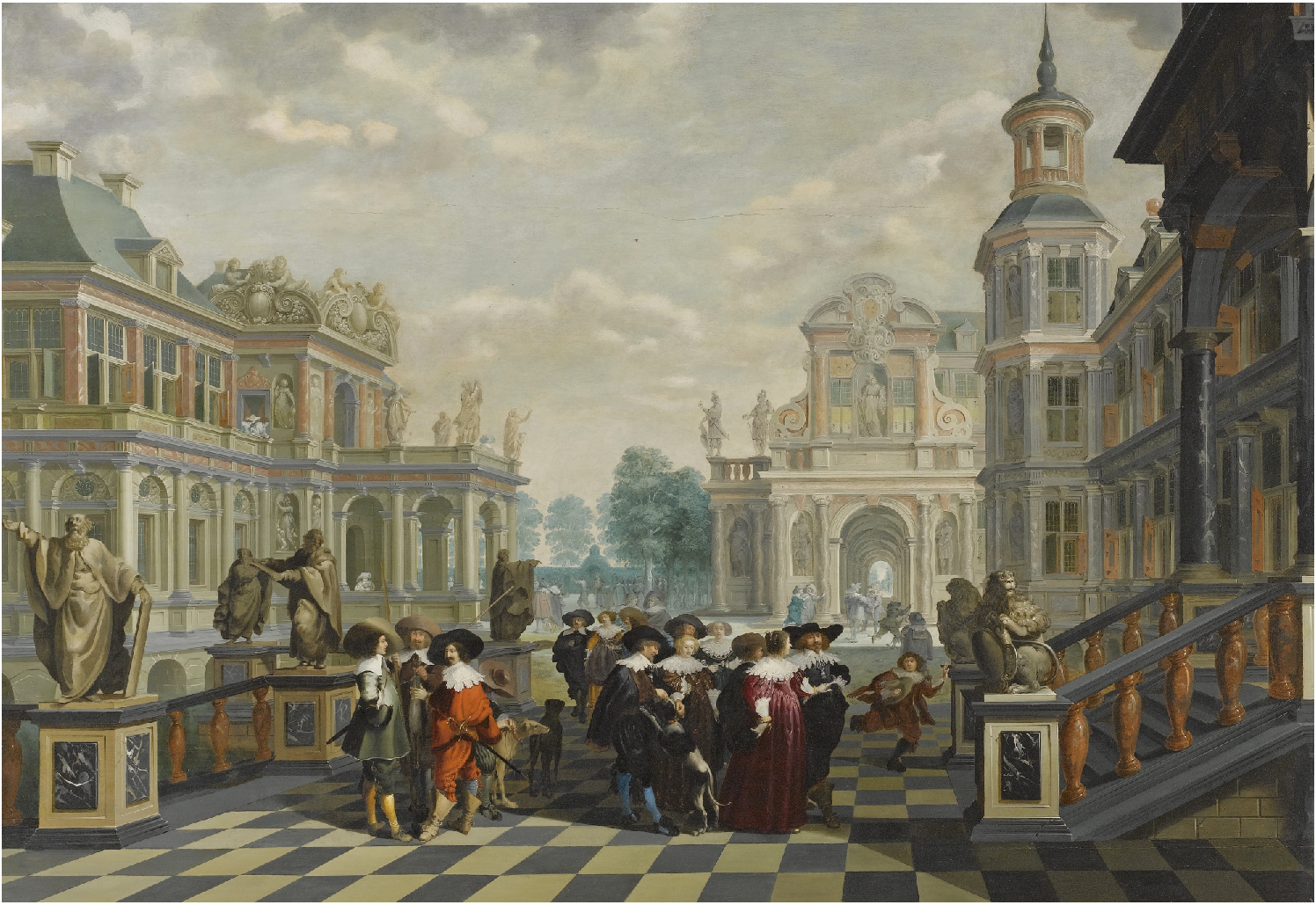
Elaborate Palace Courtyard With Elegant Company, c. 1635

After 1630 van Delen’s style became more exuberant and palace exteriors became his favourite subject. Van Delen’s palette also became lighter and brighter. The fullness of the Antwerp Baroque style had by then taken a firm grasp of the artist. His palette also became brighter and lighter. The buildings he depicted became dominated by pink, white and black marble and were from then on decorated with an excess of sculpture. Around 1640 van Delen produced his most ambitious works, which were more sober in colour. Thereafter his output rapidly declined.

=== Collaborations ===
The staffage of his works has at times been attributed to other painters, such as Anthonie Palamedesz., Dirck Hals, David Teniers the Younger and Hieronymus Janssens. There is some doubt about all of these attributions as van Delen lived in relative isolation and it would not have been easy for him to collaborate with these artists. He probably painted most figures himself and in old inventories only figures by Poelenburch and a certain Gerards are mentioned. It is more likely that he was a capable figure painter himself and that in many of his work he copied or took as his model the figures of contemporary figure specialists.

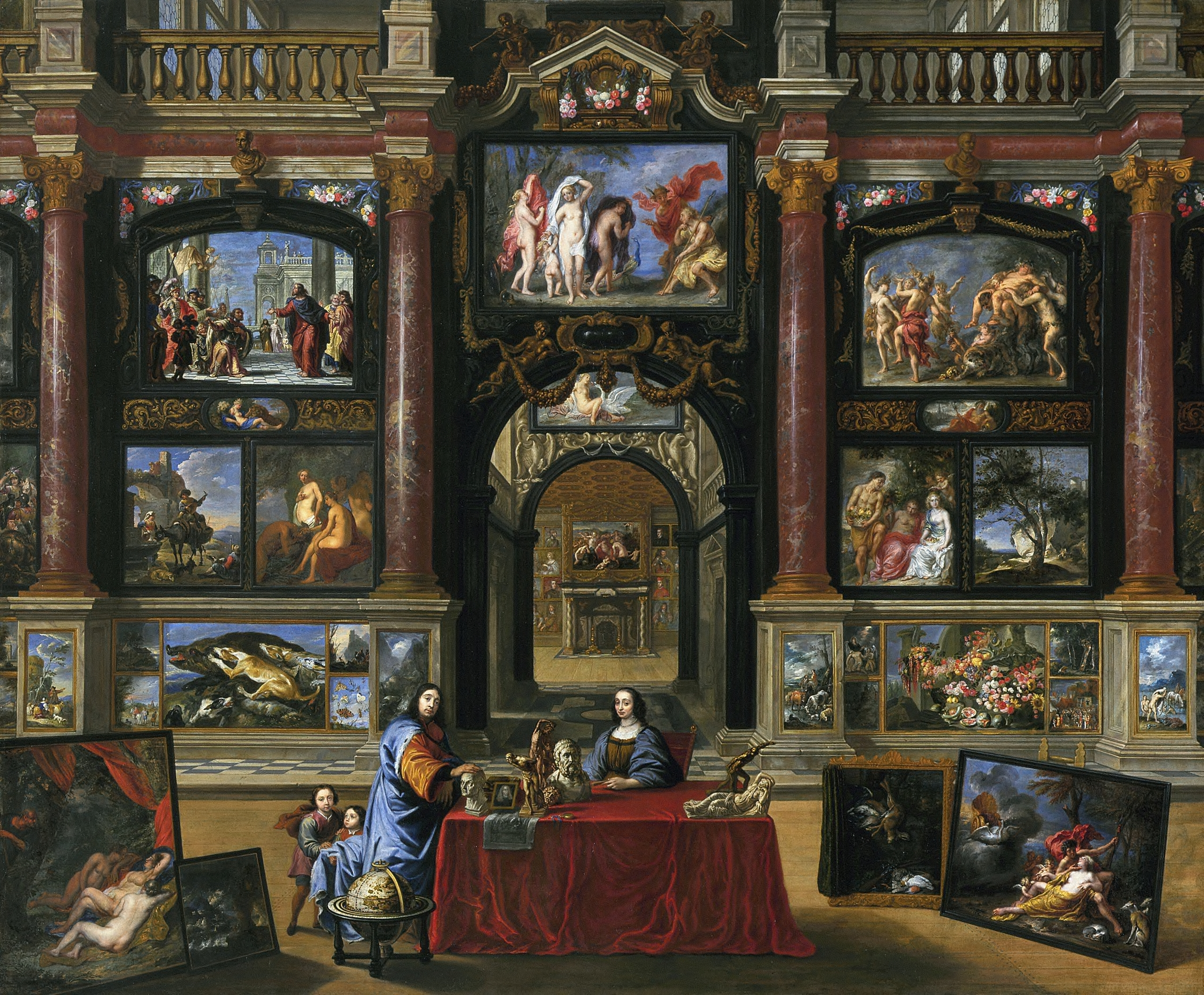
Interior with figures in a picture gallery

Van Delen is believed to have collaborated with the Antwerp painter Gonzales Coques, who painted the staffage, on the painting Interior with figures before a picture collection. It was believed earlier that it was Wilhelm Schubert van Ehrenberg who painted the architectural setting but it is now ascribed to Dirck van Delen. The composition Interior with figures before a picture collection falls into the genre known as 'gallery paintings'. Gallery paintings depict large rooms in which many paintings and other precious items are displayed in elegant surroundings. The composition depicts a large gallery with many pictures on the walls and standing on the floor. A man and woman are sitting at a table on which are placed various sculptures and two children stand next to them. Possibly the picture depicts the Antwerp collector Antoon van Leyden (1626–1686), his wife Marie-An van Eywerven and their two daughters. The couple appears to be discussing and appreciating some of the artworks in the gallery. They are thus portrayed as forming part of an elite who possess privileged knowledge of art. The composition aims to emphasize this notion that the powers of discernment associated with connoisseurship are socially superior to or more desirable than other forms of knowing. The pictures depicted in the room likely represent works of leading Antwerp painters. The presence of children in this type of composition has been explained by the popularity in the Netherlands during the 1660s and 70s of genre scenes showing domestic interiors and ‘ordinary’ people.

== Gallery ==
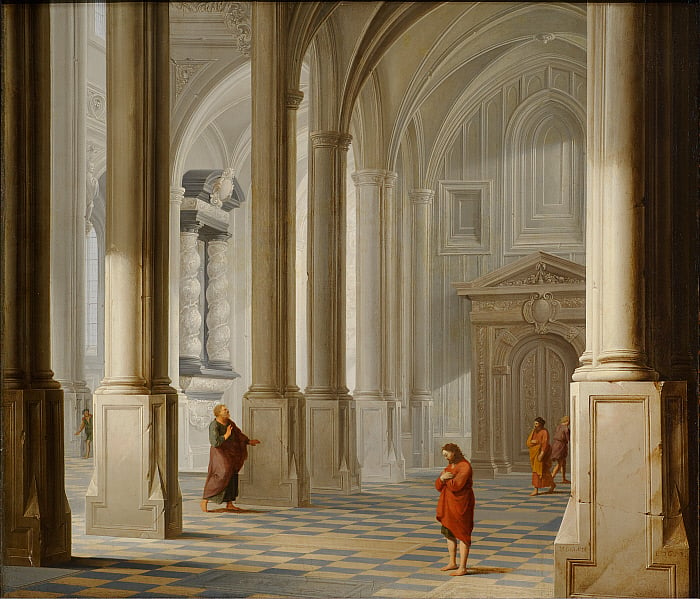
Church Interior with the Parable of the Pharisee and the Publican (Luke 18:9-14) (1653), oil on panel, 19 7/16 × 22 in. (49.4 × 55.9 cm), Clark Art Institute
