= Daniël de Blieck =

Dutch painter

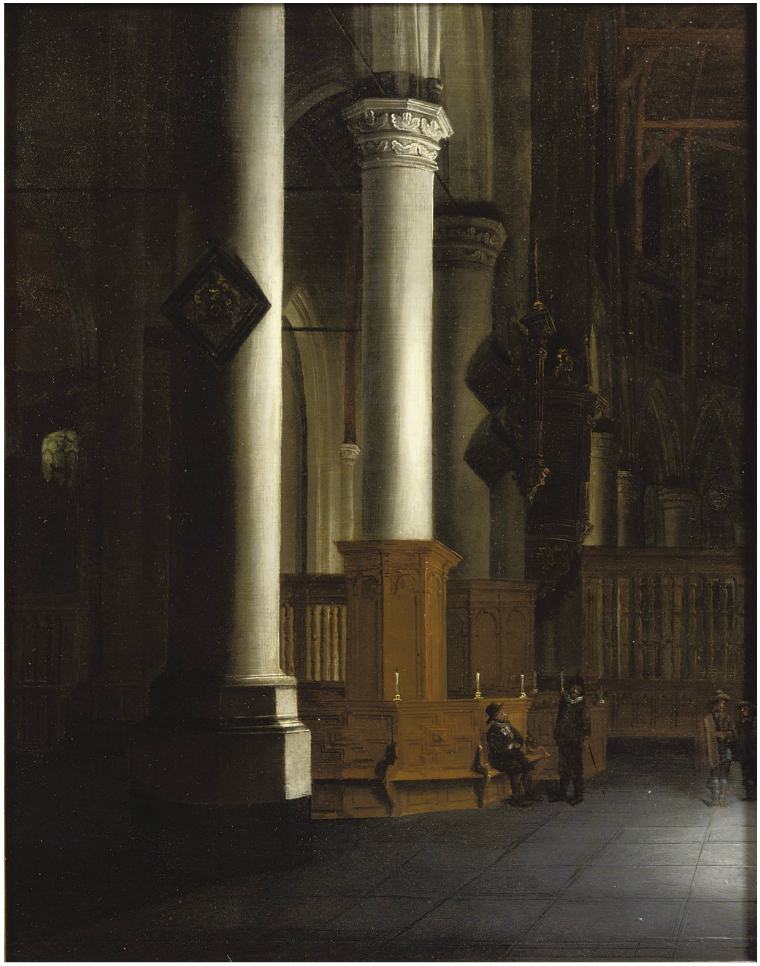
The interior of the 'Laurenskerk', Rotterdam

Daniël de Blieck (Middelburg, c. 1610 – Middelburg, 1673), was a Dutch Golden Age painter, draughtsman and architect, who specialised in architectural paintings. He painted both real and imaginary church interiors.

== Life ==
Little is known about Daniël de Blieck's life and training. It is presumed that he was a pupil of architectural painter Dirck van Delen. He became a member of the Middelburg Guild of Saint Luke in 1647–1648 as an architect. He was deacon of the Guild in 1664–1665 and 1668. He resided in England from 1658 to 1661.

When the States of Zeeland – the governing body of Zeeland – decided to mint coins mechanically, de Blieck was commissioned to produce drawings on the production of the necessary equipment. He was well aware of the latest technical advances as he knew the equipment in Paris and had made drawings of the minting equipment in Dortrecht. The building of the minting machines was not without problems, and de Blieck made a number of trips to Antwerp, Rotterdam and The Hague as supervisor for repairs and parts.

Adriaen van de Graeff was his pupil in 1665.

== Work ==
Daniël de Blieck principally painted architectural studies but is also known for some portraits. He painted both real and imaginary church interiors.

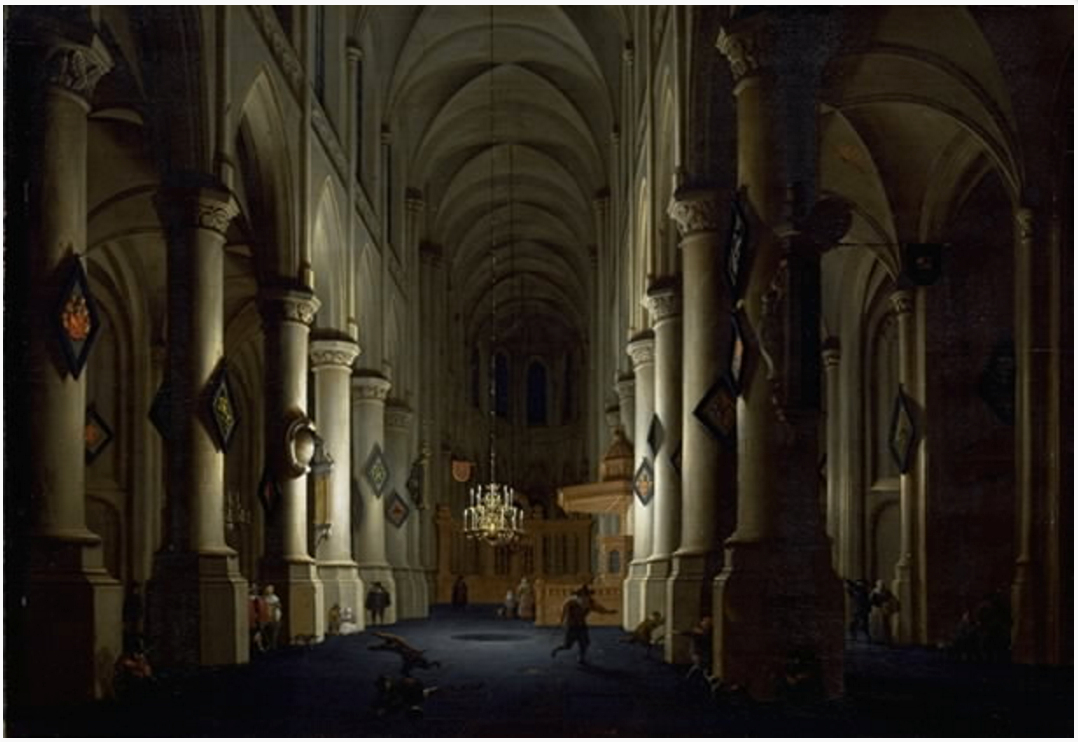
Interior of a church

His imaginary architectural paintings of church interiors were in the style of the Flemish painter Hendrick Aerts, but under the influence of architectural painters of the Delft school such as Hendrick Cornelisz. van Vliet, he developed a more realistic style around 1650. His painting of the Rotterdam St. Lawrence Church of the early 1650s demonstrates this interest in realism. However, he did not abandon the style of imaginary architecture paintings and it has been claimed that he never found his own style.

Between 1655 and 1657 he kept a sketch book in which he drew 82 architectural drawings, and these are more realistic in style.

Daniël de Blieck painted in 1663 a history scene representing Alexander Slaying Cleitus. A rare example of a Dutch history painting at a time when mythological and genre scenes and landscapes were much more popular. The central story of the brutal murder by Alexander the Great of his General, Cleitus, is made secondary to the sweeping arches and soaring colonnades of this architectural fantasy. The scene of the murder is set in classical architecture which is reminiscent of Classical Rome. The figures are likely to be by another artist, as may be the still-life to the left.

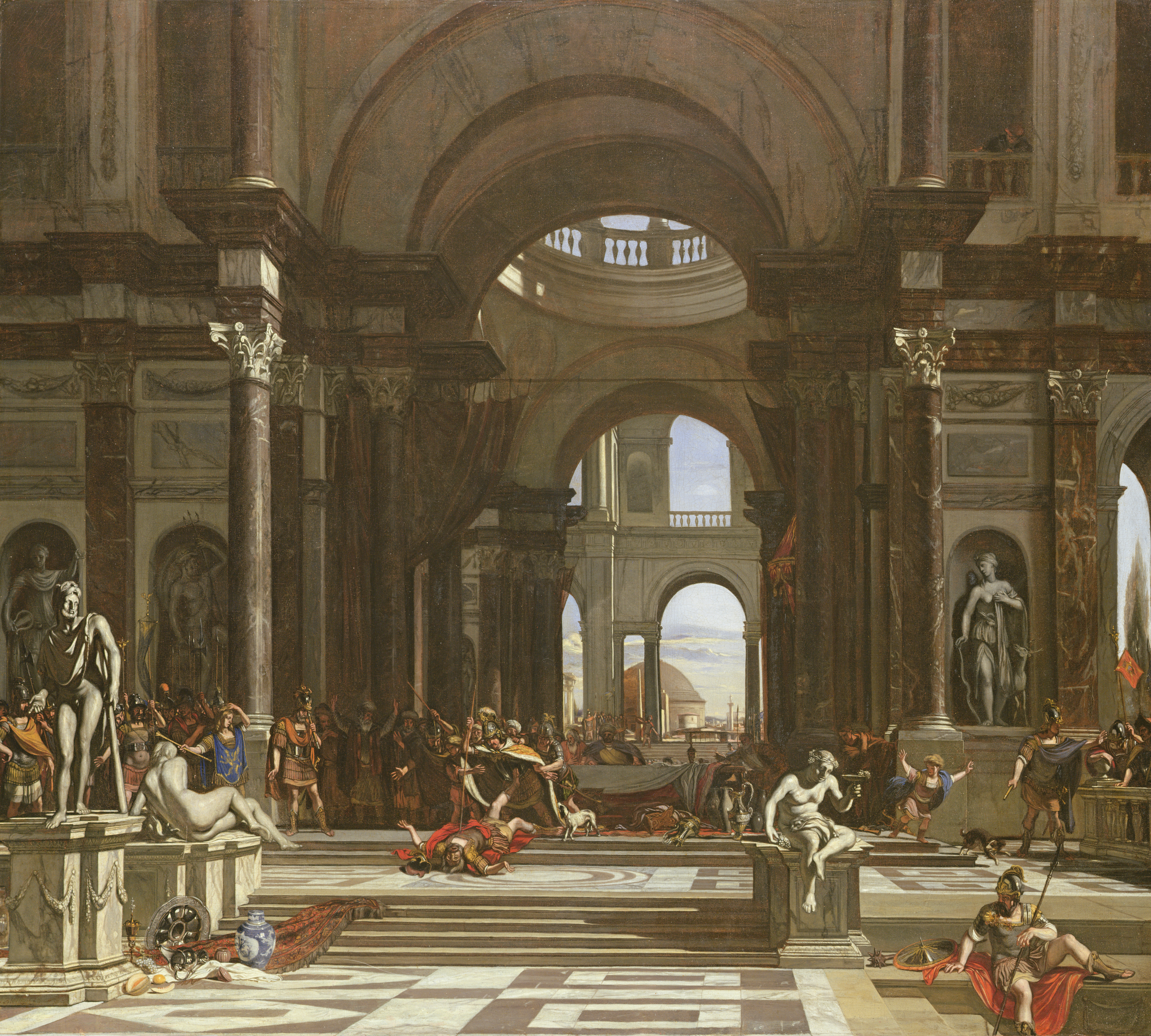
Alexander Slaying Cleitus

De Blieck was also an architect but little is known about his work in this field. He designed a new warehouse for the Dutch East India Company.
