= Latombe =

Latombe is a surname. Notable people with the surname include:

- Jean-Claude Latombe (born 1947), French-American scientist
- Nicolaes Latombe (1616–1676), Dutch painter
