= Delft City Hall =

Seat of government in Delft, Netherlands

Coordinates: 52°0′41″N 4°21′28″E

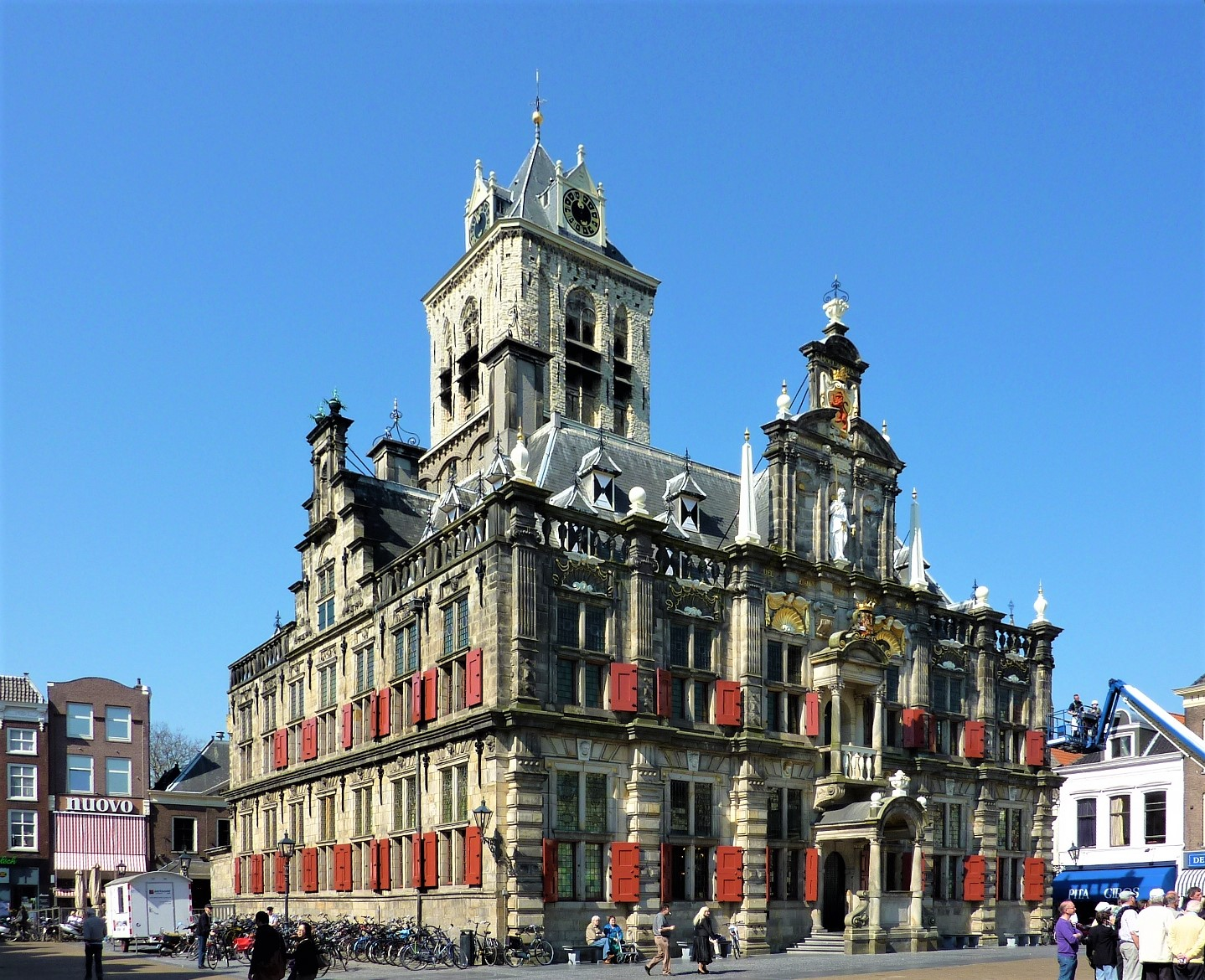
City Hall, Markt, Delft. The building with the red shutters dates back to 1618-20, while the belfry is much older and is covered in expensive Belgian limestone.

The City Hall in Delft is a Renaissance style building on the Markt across from the Nieuwe Kerk. It is the seat of the city's government as well as a popular venue for civic wedding ceremonies. Most administrative functions have been transferred to an office inside the Delft railway station building. Originally designed by the Dutch architect Hendrick de Keyser, it was heavily changed over the centuries and was restored in the 20th century to its Renaissance appearance.

== History ==
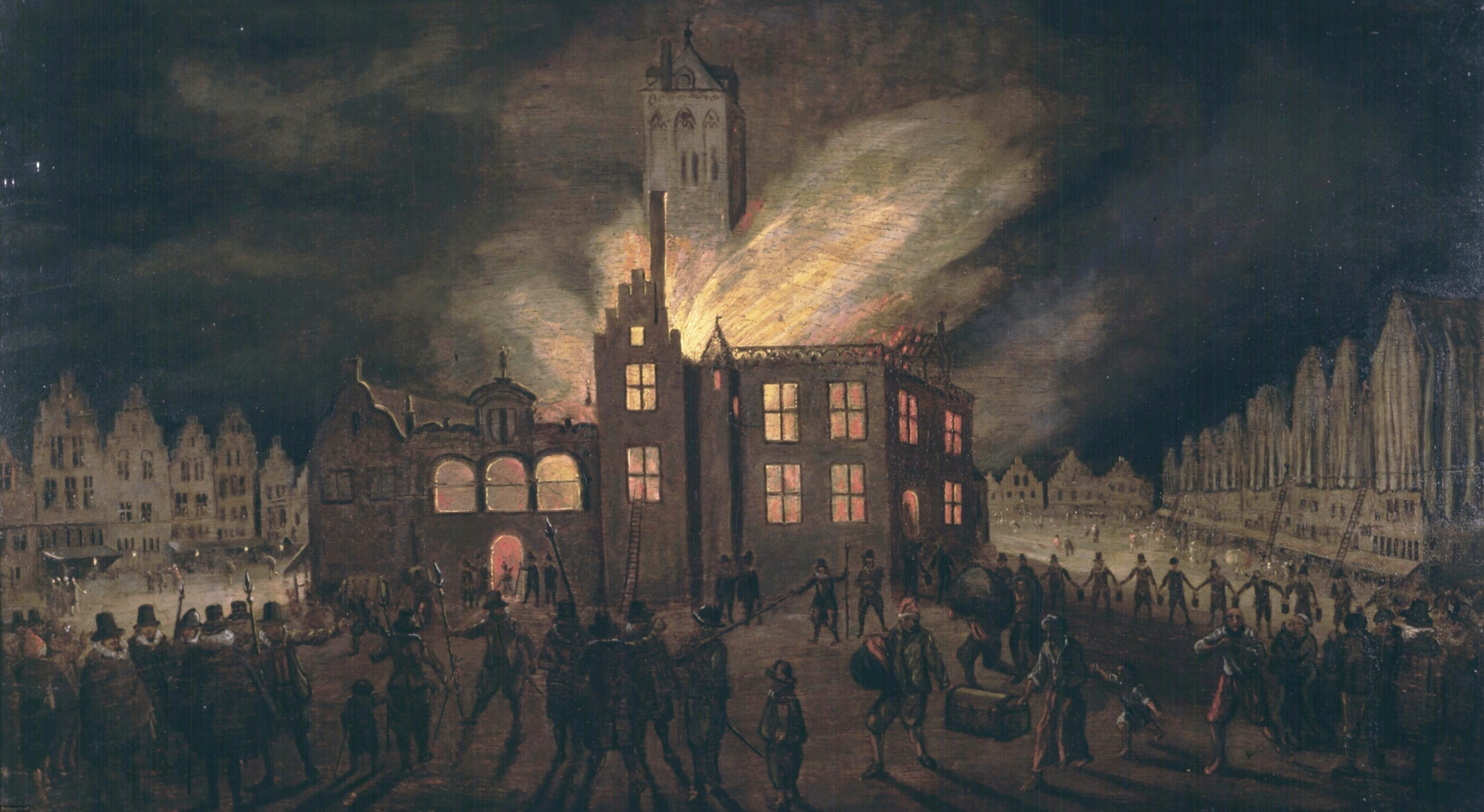
The old city hall burned in 1618, and since Hendrik de Keyser was working across the Markt at the Nieuwe Kerk, he was asked to design a new one.

In the town hall from 1618 are some group portraits, and portraits of the counts of Orange and Nassau, including several by Michiel van Mierevelt (1567–1641), one of the earliest Dutch portrait painters, and with his son Pieter (1595–1623), a native of Delft. The oldest part of the complex is the belfry covered in "Gobertanger" limestone from Wallonia, a building material used often in important renaissance buildings in the Netherlands up to 1600. The tower, called "De Steen" or "The Stone", was originally built around 1300 and has decorative clockfaces from 1536 and the bells were made by Hendrick van Trier and Francois Hemony. The facade has a "Justitia" statue. Under the tower is an old city prison where the assassin of Willem the Silent, Balthasar Gérard, was kept before sentencing.

Up the stairway and immediately behind the heavy wooden entrance doors is the Vierschaar, with a decorative painting of the Judgment of Solomon by Pieter van Bronckhorst.

== Vierschaar ==
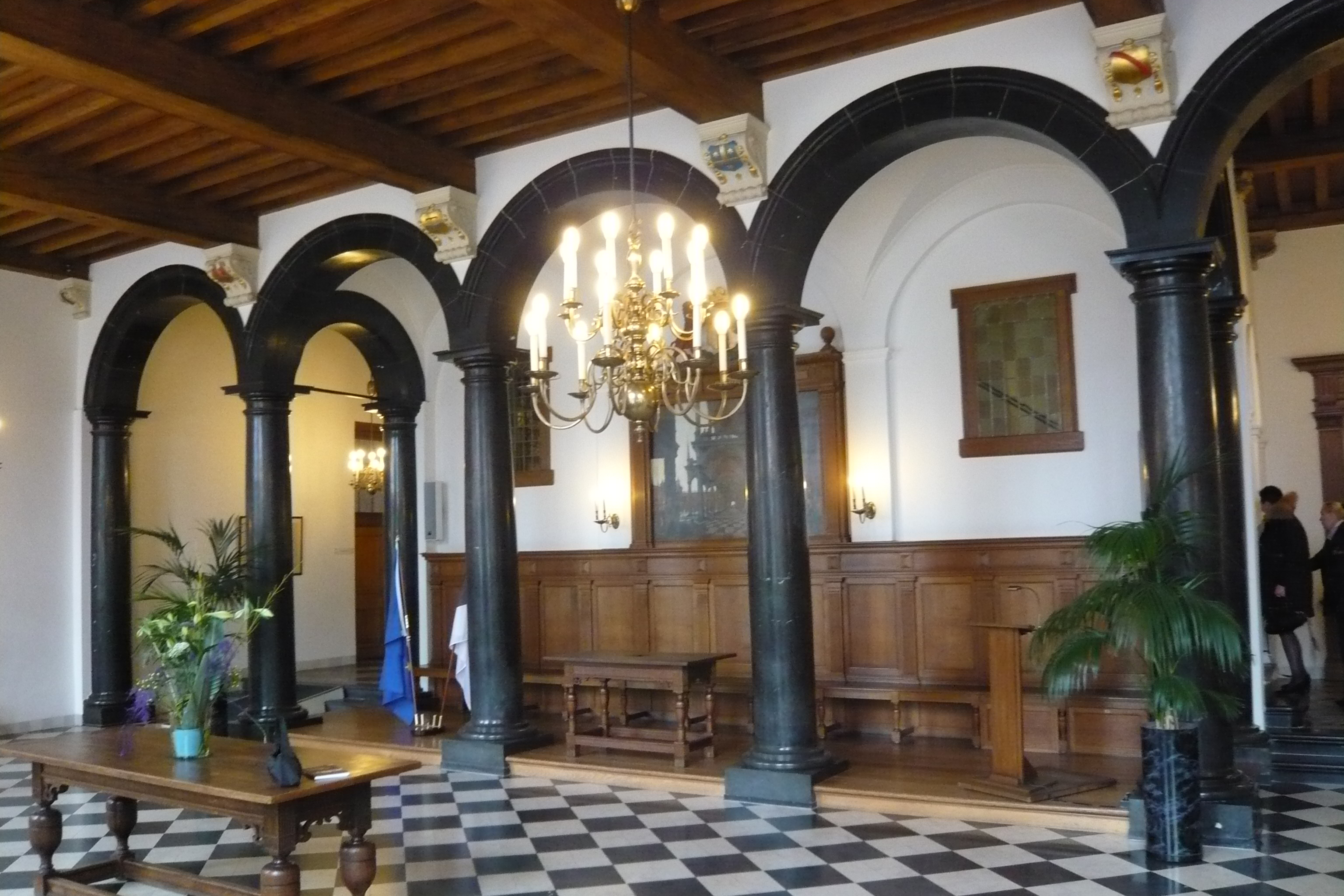
Vierschaar with painting on the wall by Bronkhorst

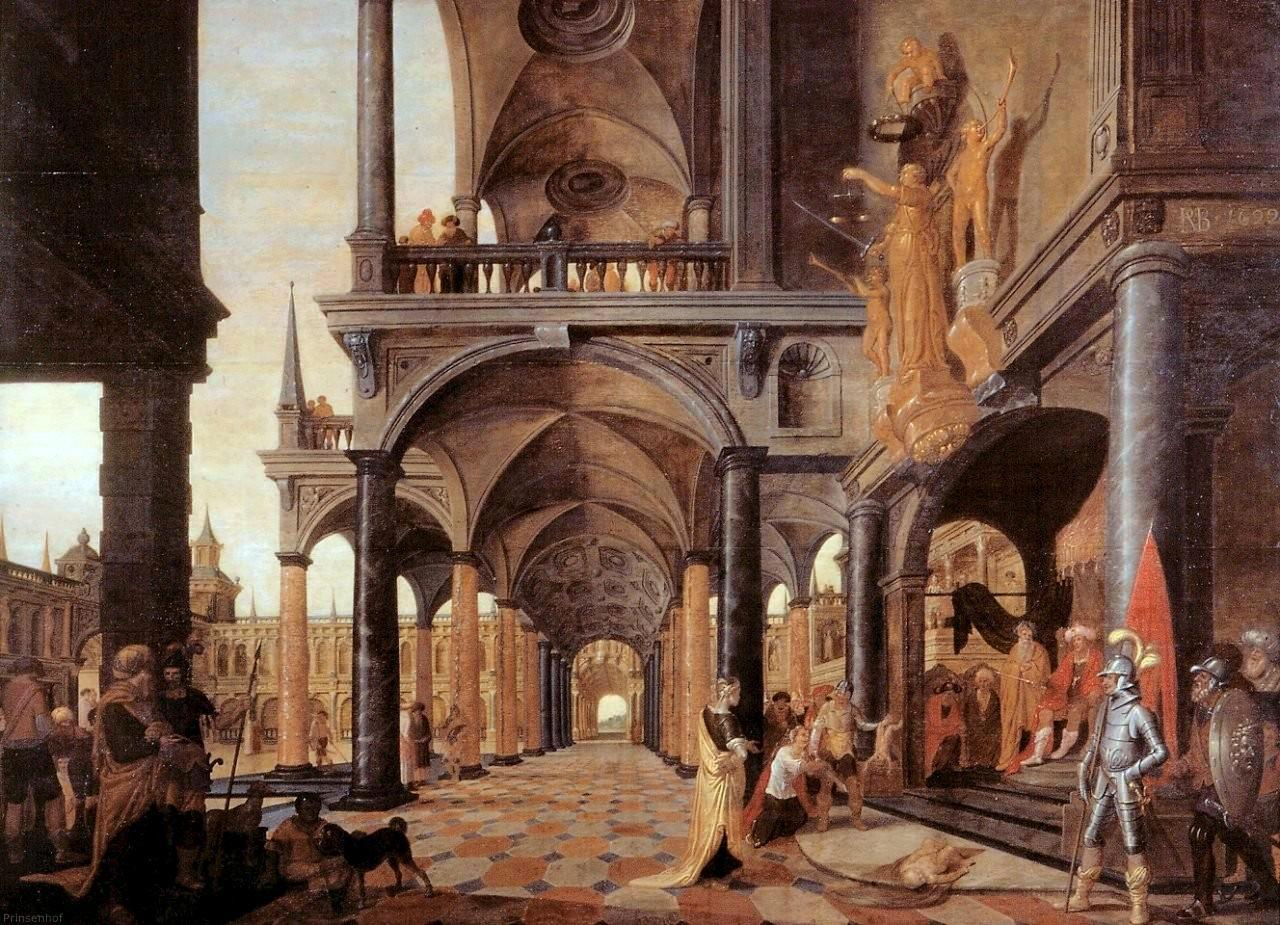
Judgement of Salomon, by Bronkhorst, 1622

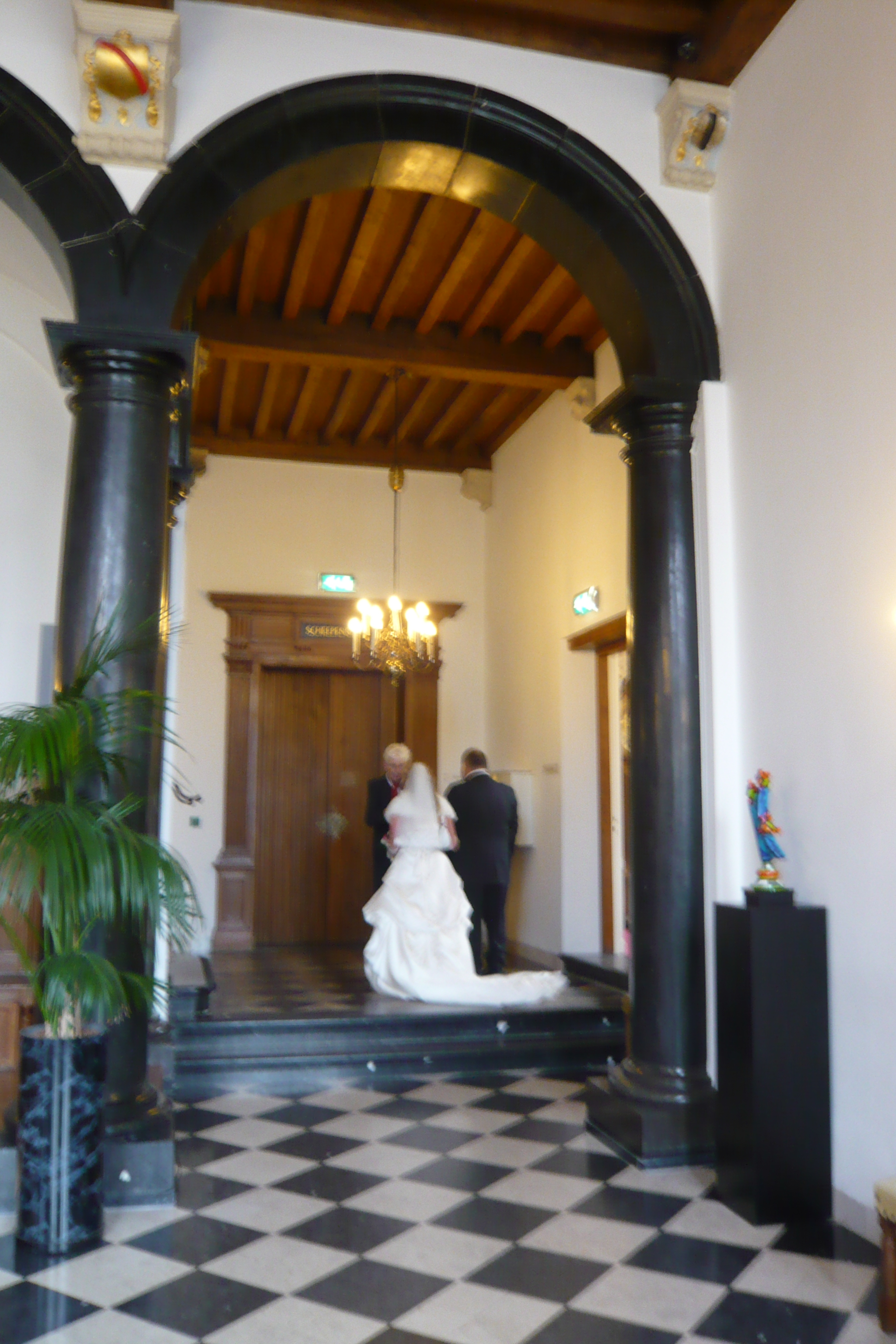
The City hall is still used for civic weddings, and couples pass through the Vierschaar to the main hall for the ceremony

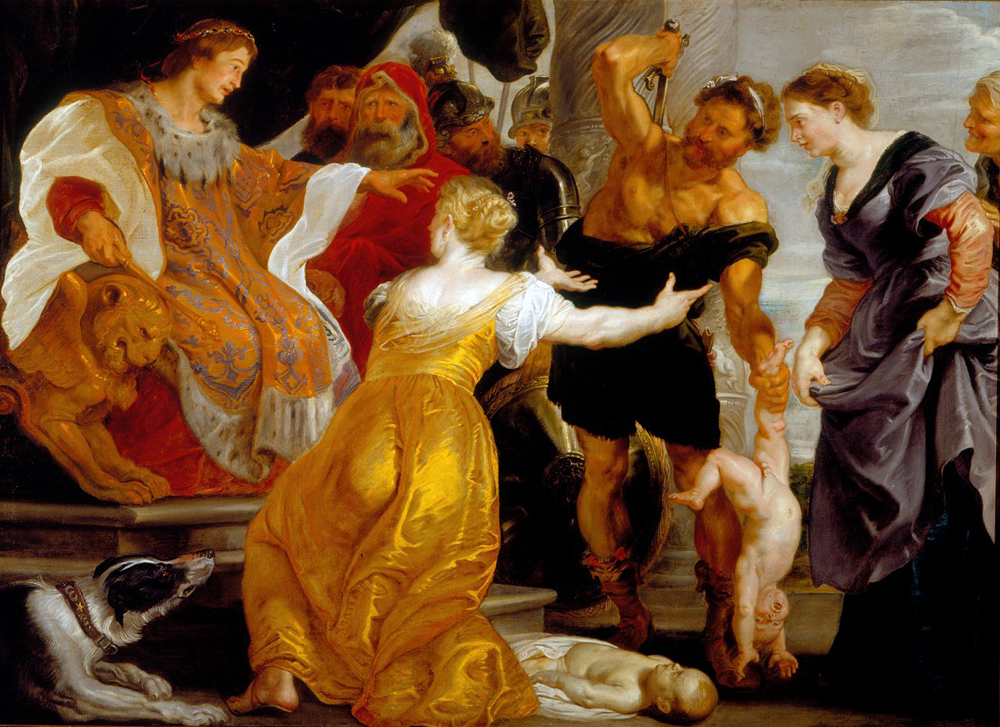
Judgement of Salomon by Rubens'workshop, c.1615

== Other views ==
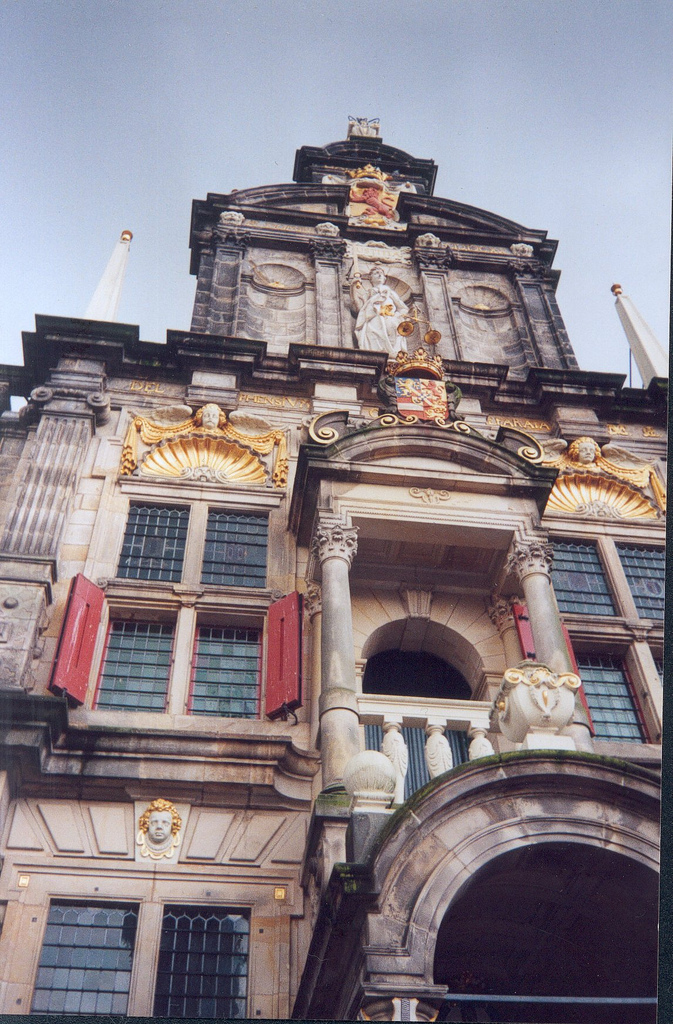
View of the front facade with sculpture of Justitia

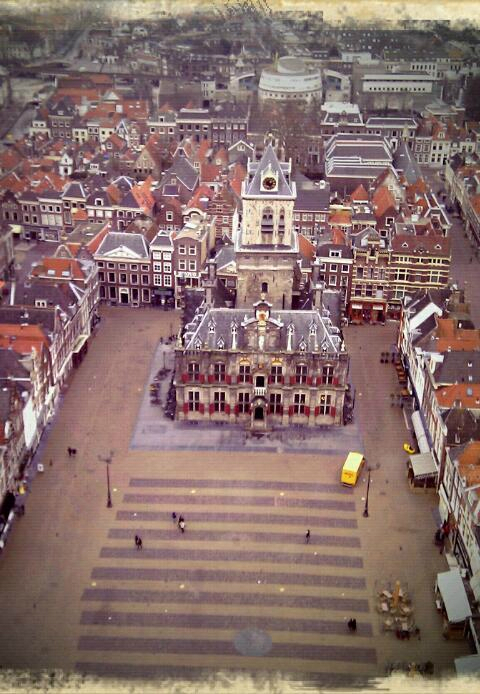
City hall seen from the tower in the Nieuwe Kerk opposite

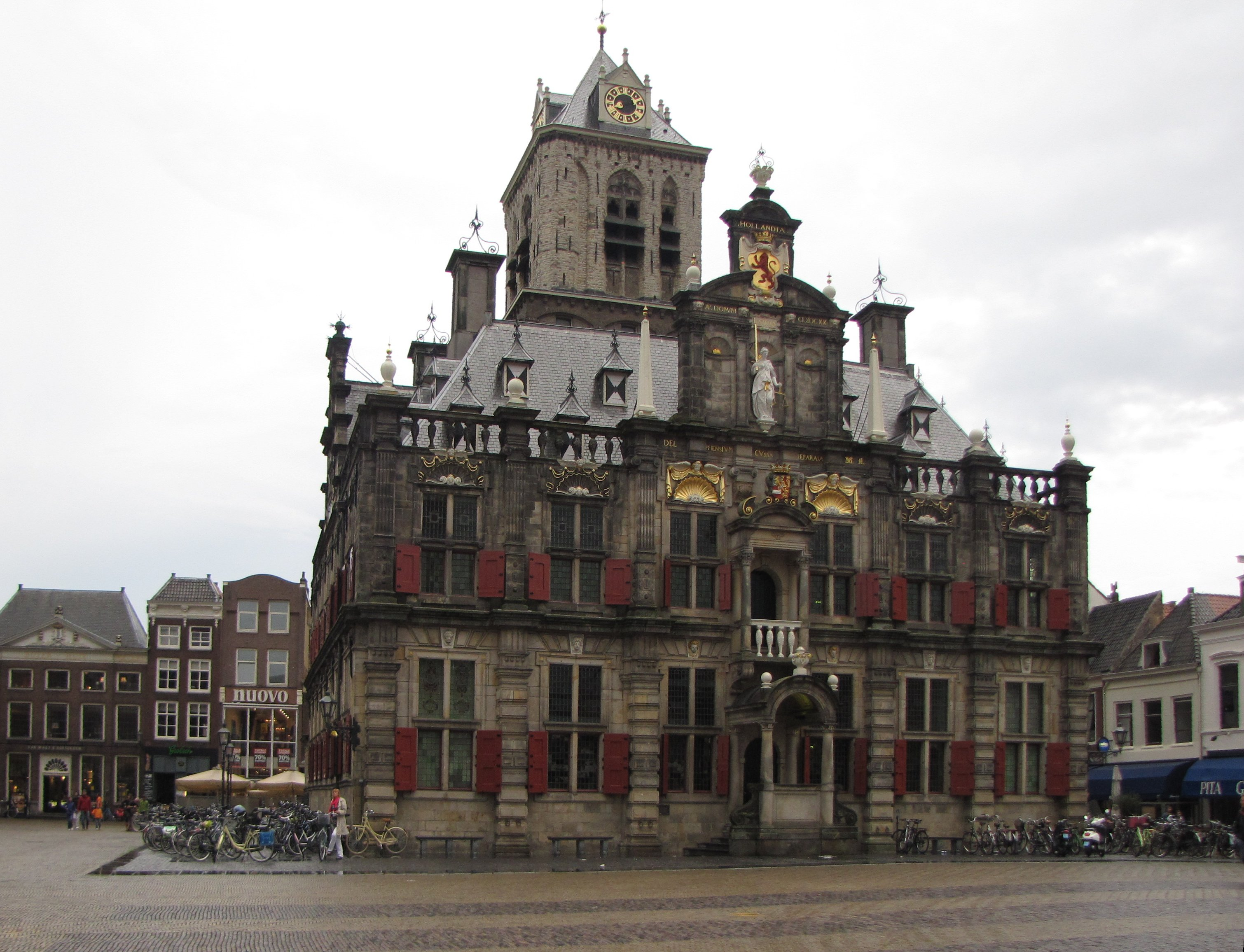
Seen from the front

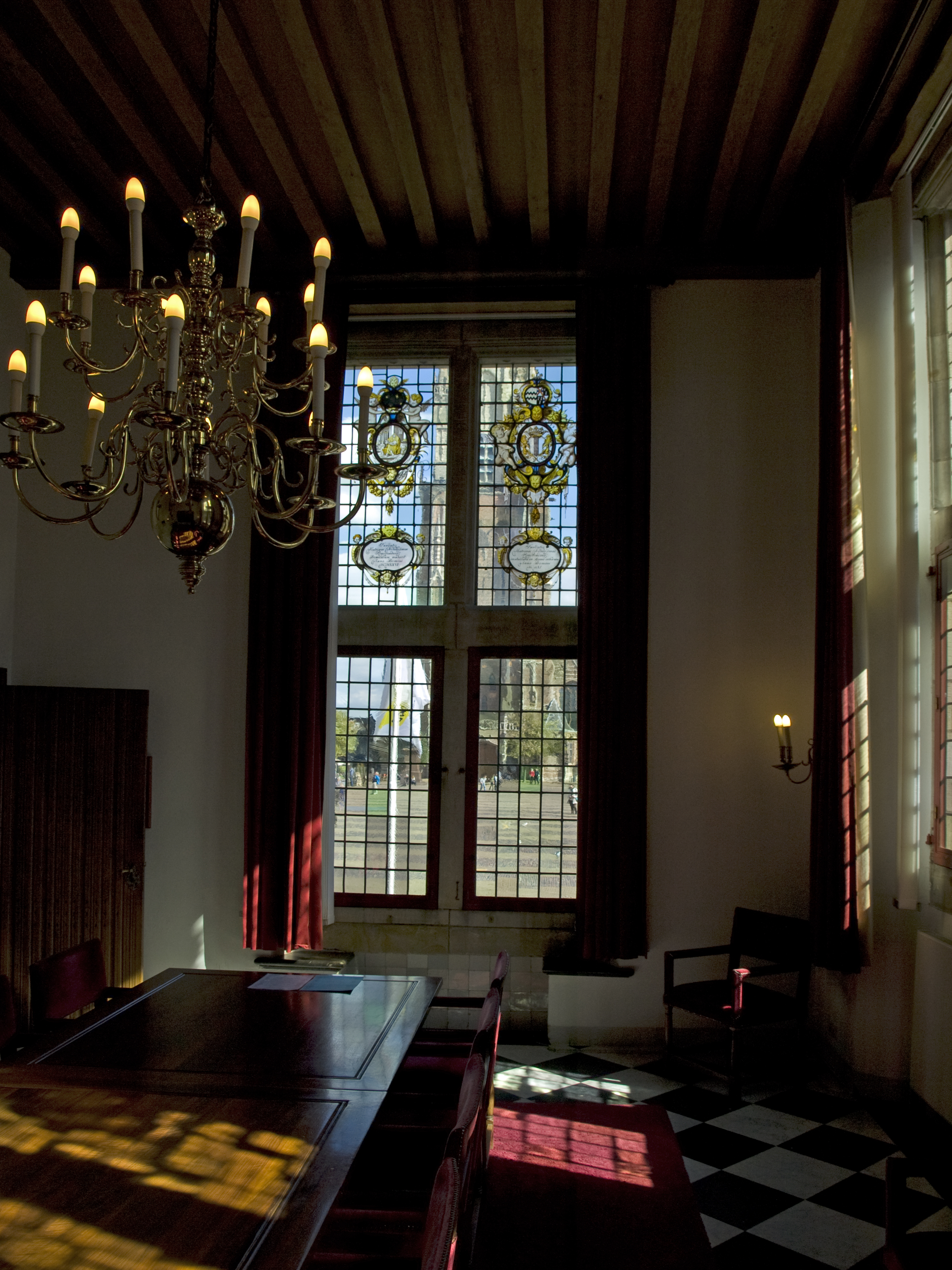
Inside, the Nieuwe Kerk is seen through the window

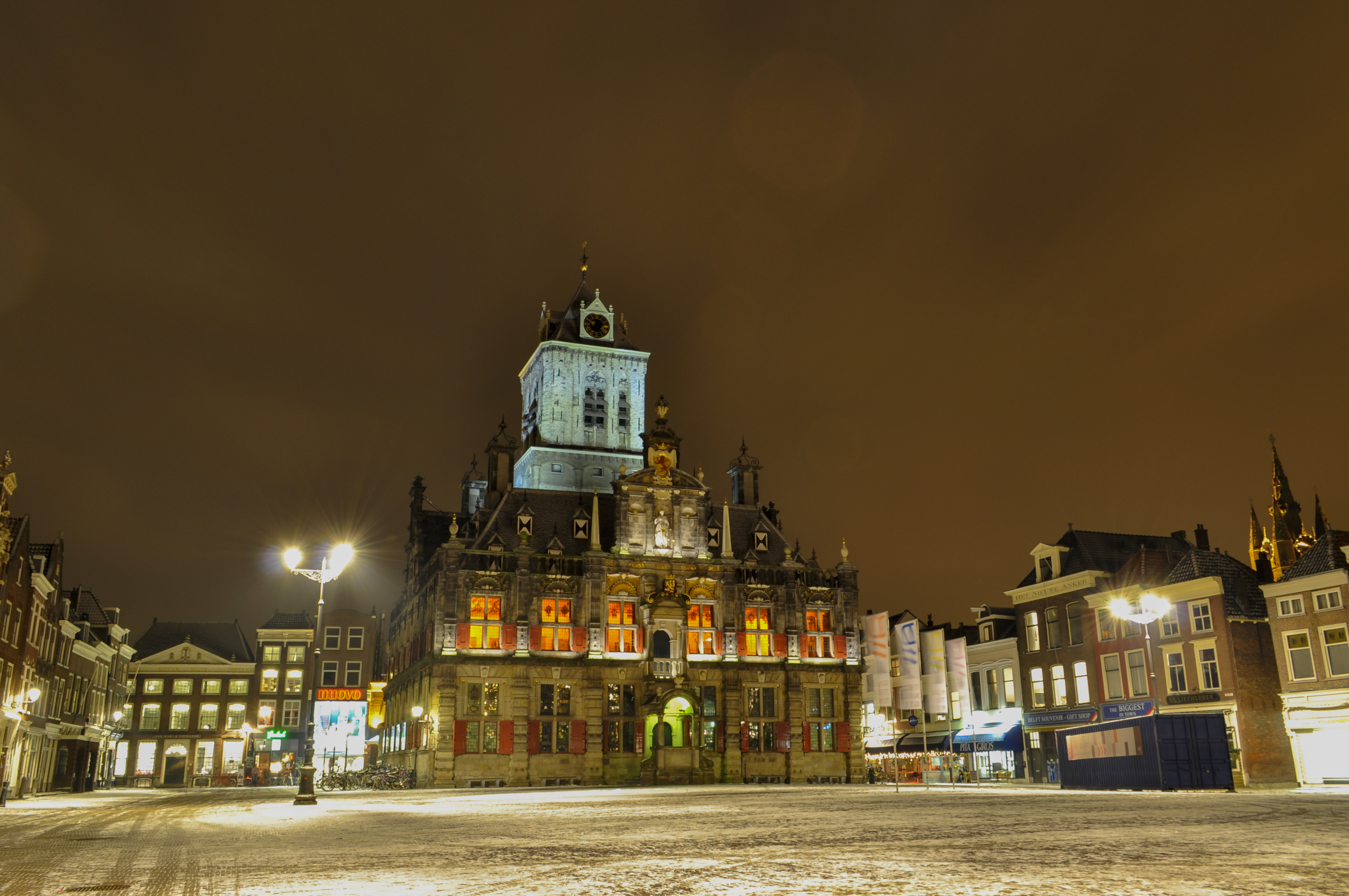
City hall in winter
