= Nuno Pires =

Nuno Pires is a businessman from South Africa. He is the co-founder of Altis Biologics.

== Career ==
Pires founded Altis Biologics with Nicolaas Duneas in 2002. He is the chief executive of business development at the company.

In 2012, the company won the Africa SMME Awards in the Industrial Sector category.

In 2014, Pires and Duneas won the Innovation Prize for Africa. They received $100.000 for their Osteogenic Bone Matrix (OBM) innovation.

Pires is a board member of the Licensing Executive Society South Africa.
