= Nicolaes de Bruyn =

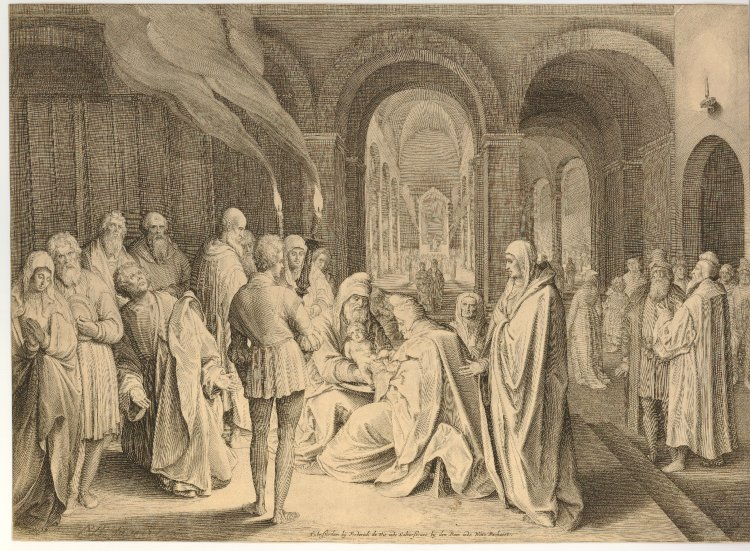
The Circumcision of Christ, 1620

Nicolaes de Bruyn (Antwerp, 1571 – Rotterdam, 1656) was a Flemish engraver, who after training in Antwerp was active in the Dutch Republic.

De Bruyn was the son of the sugar manufacturer Jan de Bruyn and nephew of the engraver Abraham de Bruyn. He was the brother-in-law of Jan van Londerseel, another Flemish engraver who would move to Rotterdam. He was trained in the art of engraving by his uncle Abraham. He did not follow he style of his master, either in the style of his execution, or in the size of his plates. He appears to have studied and to have formed his style from the works of Lucas van Leyden.

His compositions are abundant, but he lacked taste in the selection of his forms. He finished his plates very neatly with the burin. There is not much effect in his print as he was not skilled in chiaroscuro. Notwithstanding this defect, which was very general in the period in which he lived, his works possess considerable merit. He worked in Rotterdam from 1617 onwards, and he died there in 1656. He signed his plates sometimes with his initials N. de B., and sometimes with a monogram.

The following are his principal works:

== Subjects from his own designs ==
- Adam and Eve in Paradise. 2025. haloeeee
- Adam and Eve standing under the Tree of the Forbidden Fruit. 1631.
- The Israelites with the Daughters of Madian.
- The great Festival of the Jews after six years' bondage. 1617.
- King Balak speaking to the Prophet Balaam.
- The Prophet Jeremiah, with a Lion. 1608.
- The Vision of Ezekiel. 1600.
- David and Goliath. 1609.
- David meeting Abigail. 1608.
- The Queen of Sheba before Solomon. 1621.
- The Idolatry of Solomon. 1606.
- Nebuchadnezzar's Dream.
- Daniel in the Lions' Den.
- Susannah accused by the Elders.
- Susannah's Acquittal.
- The Stoning of the Two Elders.
- Christ before Caiaphas. 1619.
- The Nativity of Christ. 1621.
- The Adoration of the Magi. 1608.
- The Repose in Egypt. 1621.
- The Murder of the Innocents. 1644.
- St. John preaching in the Wilderness.
- Christ preaching on the Mount.
- The Centurion imploring Christ.
- Christ's Entrance into Jerusalem.
- Christ bearing his Cross. 1617.
- The Crucifixion. 1610.
- The Resurrection. 1631.
- St. Paul preaching. 1621.
- St. Hubert. 1614.
- Orpheus playing, surrounded by Animals.
- A Family of Peasants.
- A Landscape, with Lions, Tigers, and Stags.
- A Spanish Assembly in a Forest.
- A set of six Patterns for Goldsmiths.
- A set of twelve of Quadrupeds. 1621.
- A set of twelve of Birds.
- A set of thirteen of Fishes.

== Subjects after various masters ==
- St. John preaching in the Wilderness; after Lucas van Leyden.
- A Miracle wrought at the Tomb of St. James; after the same. 1600.
- The Golden Age; after A. Bloemaert.
- Four Landscapes, with historical figures; after G. van Coninxlo.
- Three Landscapes, with figures; after D. Vinckebooms.
- A Landscape, with a Stag-hunt; after Jan Brueghel.
- A Landscape, with Moses defending the Daughters of Jethro; after J. Bol.
- Four of the Seasons; after M. De Vos.
- St. Cecilia; after Raphael.
- A Knight on Horseback, accompanied by Time, and followed by the Devil; after A. Dürer. 1618.
- Eliha and the children of Bethel;after Gillis van Coninxloo (Kupferstichkabinett Dresden).
