= Jan van Londerseel =

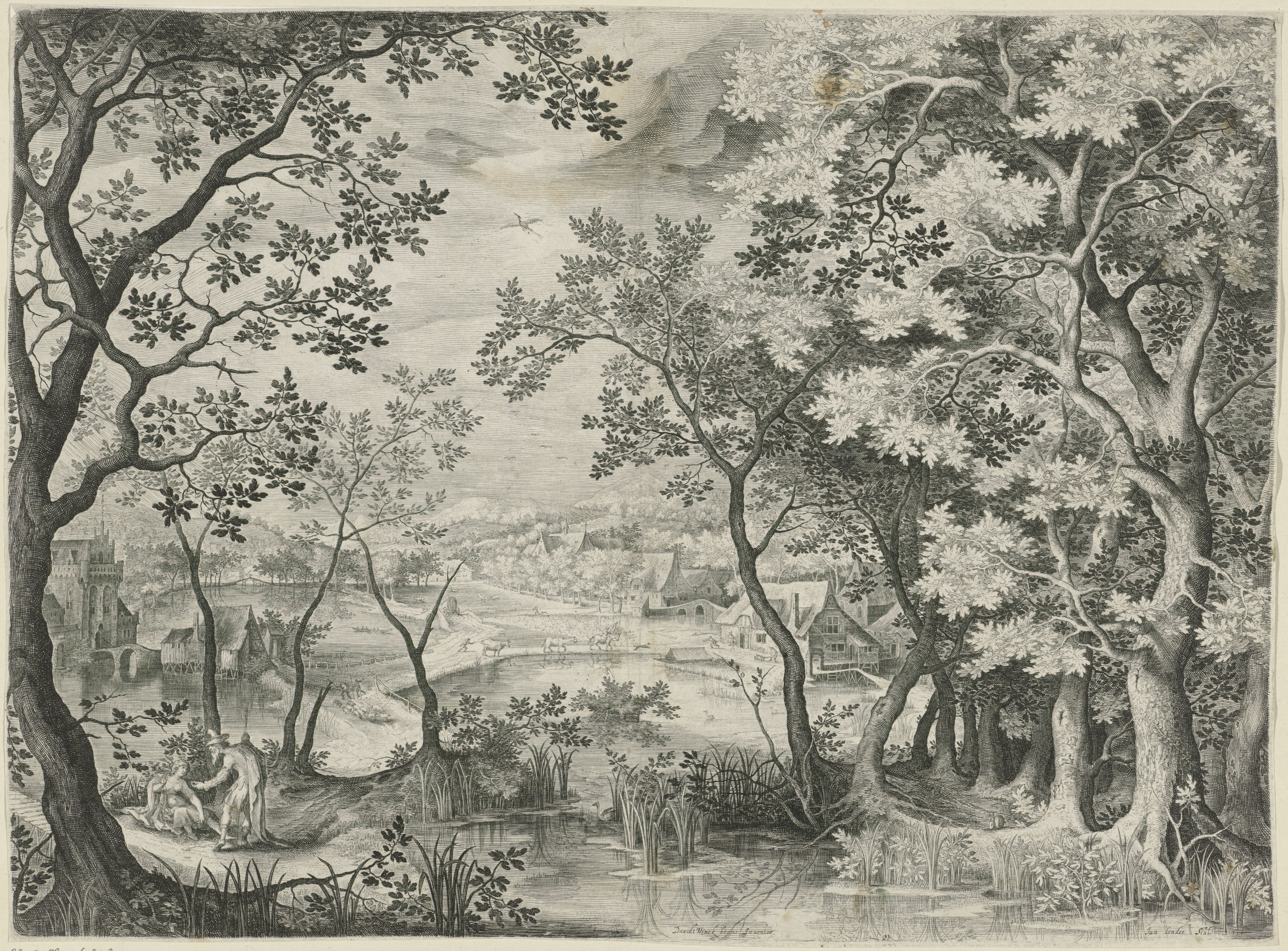
Landscape with Judah and Tamar

Jan van Londerseel (Antwerp, between 1570 and 1575 - Rotterdam, 1624–25) was a Flemish draughtsman, engraver, etcher and print maker. After training and working in Antwerp he was active in the Dutch Republic during the latter part of his career.

== Life ==
Jan van Londerseel was born as the son of Jan or Hans (the Elder) and baptised on 25 January 1578 in Antwerp. He was probably a pupil of Abraham de Bruyn in Antwerp. His brother Assuerus van Londerseel (baptized on 30 March 1572) was an engraver and publisher who moved to the Dutch Republic and married Agnietien Jans van Gelder in Amsterdam on 1 May 1599. His sister Susanna van Londerseel married the engraver Nicolaes de Bruyn, a nephew of Abraham de Bruyn who later moved to the Dutch Republic.

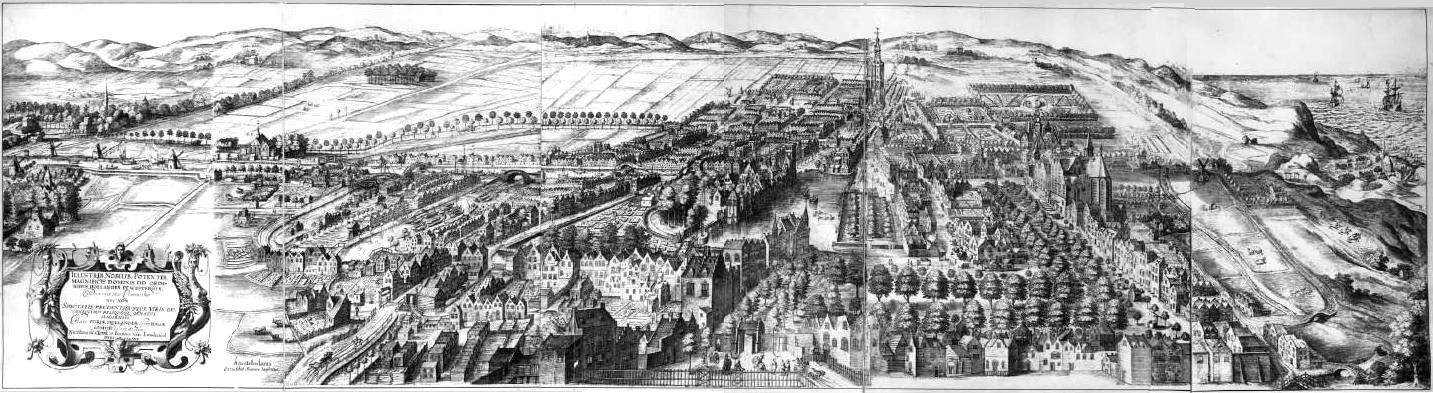
Bird eye's view of The Hague and Scheveningen

Around 1600 Jan followed his brother Assuerus to the Dutch Republic. He was first active in Amsterdam as a painter. He married (place and date unknown) Pierijntje van Dalen (1585-1650). The couple's son, also called Jan or Johan, was a silversmith and engraver by whom only one engraving is known.

From 1610 Jan the elder was working as an engraver in Rotterdam. He lived around 1614/15 in Delft. He returned to Rotterdam where he is believed to have died before 7 January 1625.

== Work ==
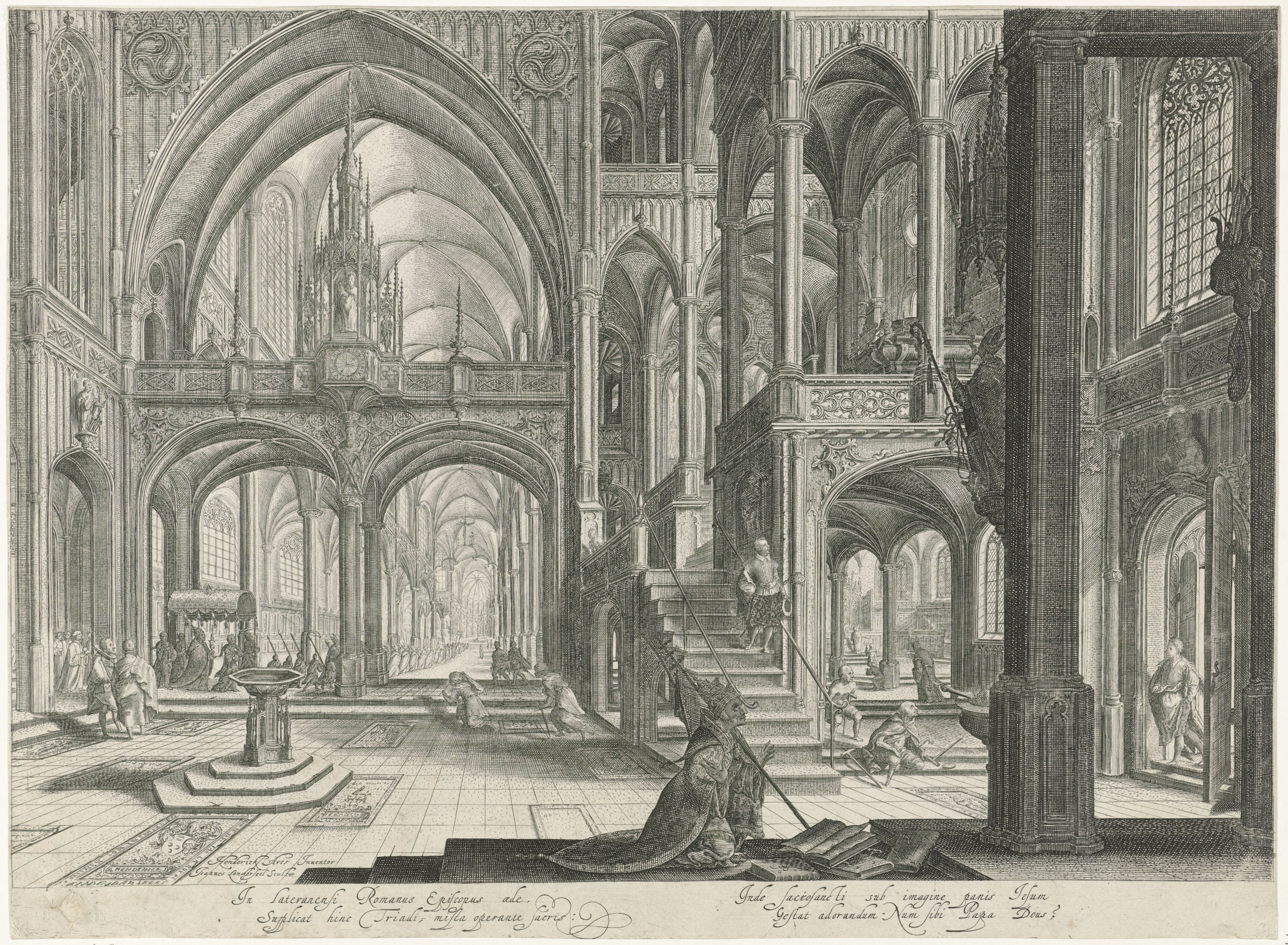
Interior of St John Lateran in Rome

The majority of his work consists of landscapes, in which he shows a preference for picturesque details, such as gnarled trees. The engravings emphasise the contrast between black and white in the foreground and the backgrounds which are pale and lightly etched. Londerseel displays herein a strong influence from his brother-in-law Nicolaes de Bruyn. He also made a number of engravings after the architectural paintings of Hendrick Aerts. A remarkable piece is the Bird's Eye View of The Hague and Scheveningen from the North-East made in collaboration with Nicolaes de Clerck in 1614. It is a very large engraving on two plates that shows the two cities The Hague and Scheveningen in amazing detail.

He made engravings after the works of famous Flemish and Dutch painters of his time, including Gillis van Coninxloo, Hendrick Aerts, David Vinckboons, Maerten de Vos and Gillis d'Hondecoeter.

Londerseel printed and published his own works. Claes Jansz. Visscher produced later editions of many of his engravings.
