= Nicolaas Duneas =

South African biochemist (born 1972)

- Born: 1972 (age 53–54)
- Education: University of the Witwatersrand
- Known for: bone regeneration
- Scientific career
- Workplaces: Altis Biologics
- Thesis: Synergistic Interactions of Bone Morphogenetic Protein and Transforming Growth Factor-β in Bone Induction and Regeneration (1998)
- Doctoral advisor: Ugo Ripamonti
- Website: Altis Biologics

Nicolaas Duneas is a South African biochemist and developer of osteogenic biomaterials. He is the co-founder (with Nuno Pires) and CEO of Altis Biologics. The company developed the first injectable treatment for bone injuries that require grafting by using a pig-based growth material.

== Education and career ==
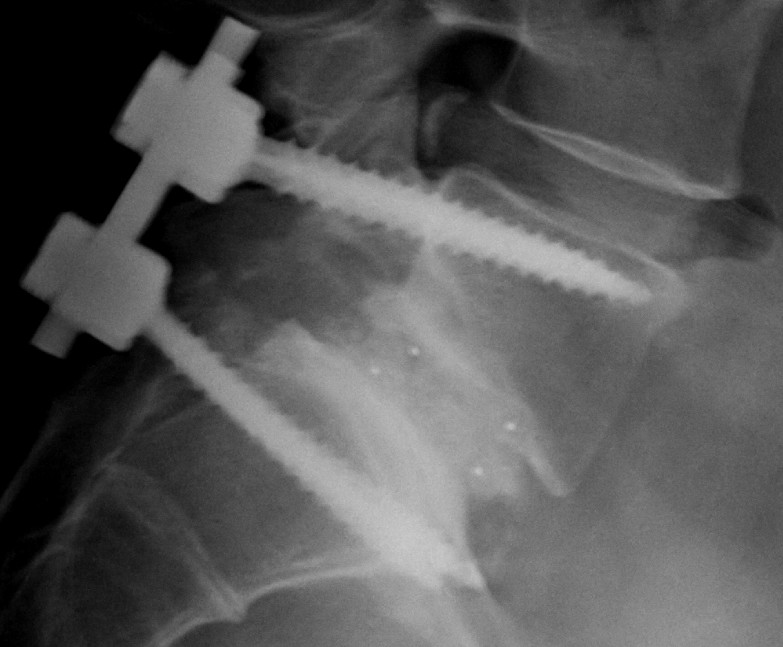
X-ray of spinal fusion

Duneas received a BSc in biochemistry in 1993 from the University of the Witwatersrand (WITS) and he holds an MBA from WITS. He also holds a Ph.D. from the WITS faculty of medicine. From 1993 until 1997, he worked as research officer for the University of the Witwatersrand.

In 2002, he founded Altis Biologics—a biotechnology company—together with Nuno Pires. Duneas was appointed CEO of Altis Biologics in 2002.

The company focusses on bone regeneration. Traditionally, when repairing a severe bone break involving a void, new bone is taken from the hip and donated to the required site. This results in permanent disfigurement of the hip and complications such as hip displacement, buttock anaesthesia and severe infections during surgery. Altis Biologics developed a method to use pig bone which had been altered to make it human compatible and also make it injectable, removing the need for surgery. The method is particularly suitable for use in spinal fusion procedures.

The research for this method began in 1994 and included pre-clinical and clinical studies (in collaboration with universities) that finally culminated in a product that was patented in 2006. In 2012 the method was approved by the largest South African medical aid (Discovery Health) and since then more than 1000 patients have been implanted with the bone graft. The tissue used in the bone grafts is manufactured in South Africa, removing the previous need to import bone graft material from the US and Europe.

From 2008 until 2010, Duneas also served as managing director of Altis Biologics. He has remained CEO since 2002.

In 2014, Duneas was interviewed by Alec Hogg for The Rational Perspective (hosted on BizNews) on Sizing up African Technology Opportunities. At the 2017 Healthcare Innovation Summit Africa he presented on bone regeneration technologies.

== Awards ==
In 2014, Duneas and Nuno Pires were awarded the Innovation Prize for Africa for the Altis Osteogenic Bone Matrix. This was the first injectable treatment for injuries requiring bone grafts using a porcine-derived regenerative biological implant. Duneas and Pires received US$100 000.

== Selected publications ==
- Limited chondro-osteogenesis by recombinant human transforming growth factor-beta 1 in calvarial defects of adult baboons (Papio ursinus). (July 1996)
- Recombinant transforming growth factor-beta1 induces endochondral bone in the baboon and synergizes with recombinant osteogenic protein-1 (bone morphogenetic protein-7) to initiate rapid bone formation. (October 1997)
- Transforming growth factor-beta 1: induction of bone morphogenetic protein genes expression during endochondral bone formation in the baboon, and synergistic interaction with osteogenic protein-1 (BMP-7). (1998)
- PubMed: Tissue morphogenesis and regeneration by bone morphogenetic proteins. (January 1998)
- Tissue Engineering of Bne, From Concept To Market (April 2, 2008)
- High yield isolation of BMP-2 from bone and in vivo activity of a combination of BMP-2/TGF-β1.(2012)
- Enhanced activity of demineralised bone matrix augmented with xenogeneic bone morphogenetic protein complex in rats. (2012 August)
- Physicochemical modification of kafirin microparticles and their ability to bind bone morphogenetic protein-2 (BMP-2), for application as a biomaterial. (August 29, 2012)
