= Nicolaes van Gelder =

Dutch Golden Age painter

- Born: 1636; Leiden
- Died: 1676 (aged 39–40); Amsterdam

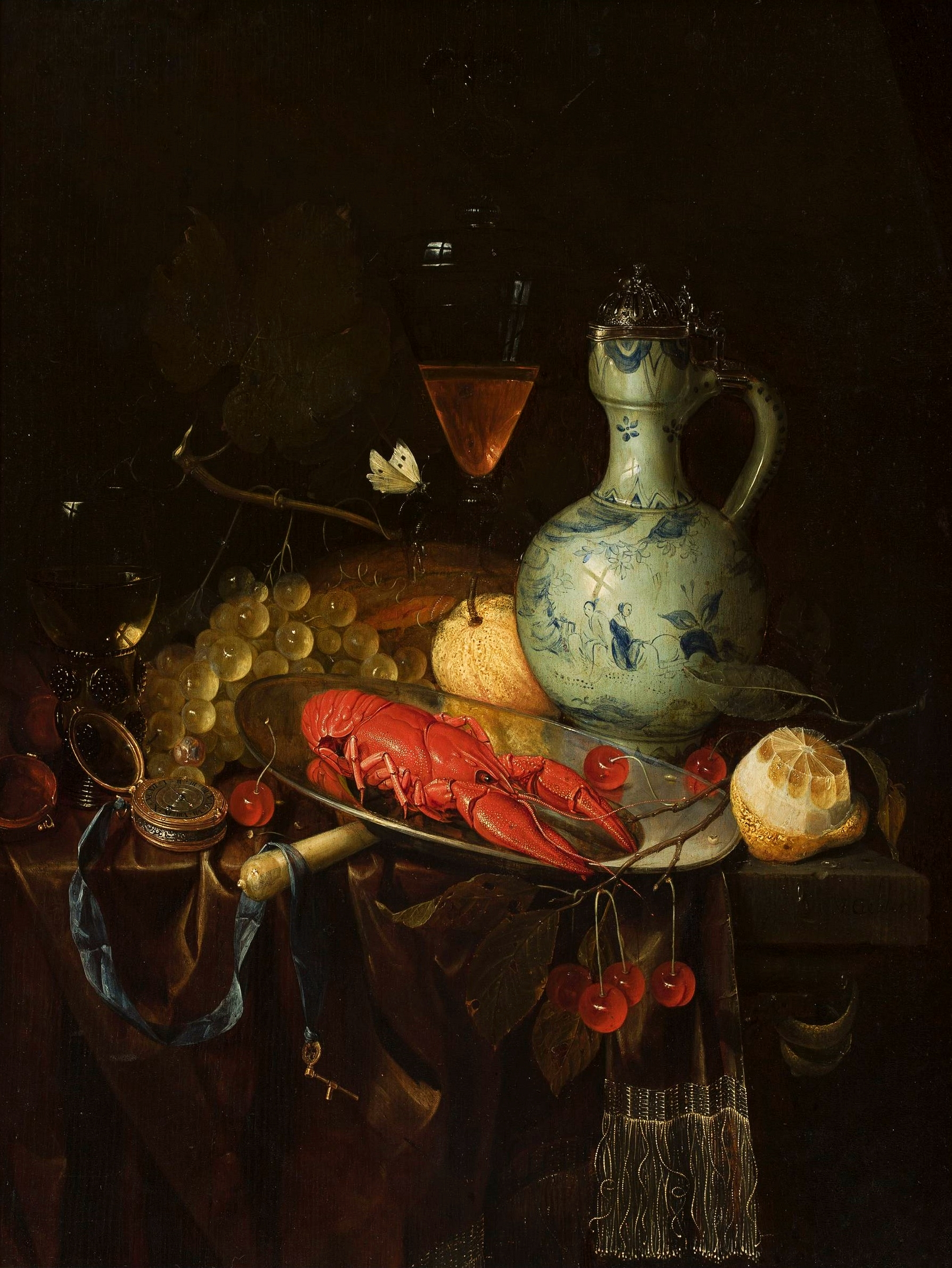
Still Life with Lobster

Nicolaes van Gelder or Claes Gelder (1636 – 1676) was a Dutch Golden Age painter.

He was born in Leiden and became a pupil of Pieter de Ring. He is known for still life paintings.

Gelder worked in Stockholm in 1661 and Copenhagen in 1673 (where his daughter was born) but died in Amsterdam. His wife was mentioned in Amsterdam in 1677 as a widow.
