= Nicolas de Liemaker =

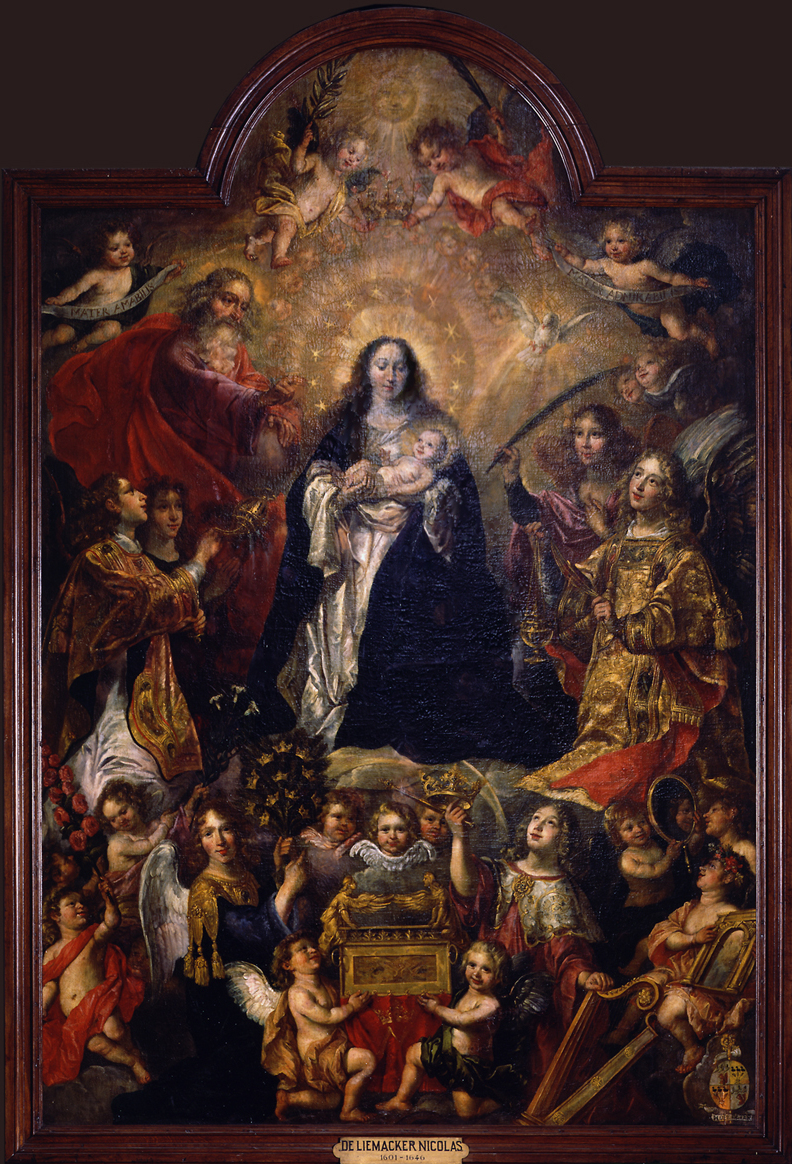
The Glorification of the Virgin St. Walburga Church (Oudenaarde)

Nicolaas Liemaker, or de Liemaker, de Liemaeckere, surnamed Roose, or Nicolaes Roose (1601 – 1646), a Flemish historical painter, was born at Ghent in 1601. He was the son of Jacob De Liemaker, a painter upon glass, and is said by Descamps to have been a pupil of Markus Geeraerts the younger, but as the latter joined his father in London in 1580, it is most likely that he studied under Otto van Veen at Antwerp. He attained high rank in his profession, and in 1625 returned to Ghent, where he died in 1646. The Museum of Ghent and the churches of that city and of other towns of Flanders possess a great number of his works. His best picture is the 'Consecration of St. Nicholas, Bishop of Myra,' which is above the high altar of the church of St. Nicholas at Ghent.
