= Abraham de Bruyn =

Flemish engraver

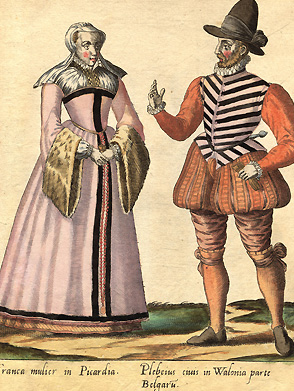
Detail from plate 26 of the Omnium pene Europae... from 1577, from a copy kept in the Plantin-Moretus Museum in Antwerp.

Abraham de Bruyn (c. 1539, Antwerp – 1587, Cologne?) was a Flemish engraver. He established himself at Cologne about the year 1577. He is ranked among the Little Masters, on account of his plates being usually very small. He engraved in the manner of Wierix, and worked entirely with the graver, in a neat and formal style, but his drawing is far from correct. It is believed that he worked also as a goldsmith. Among his portraits, and prints of small friezes of hunting, hawking, &c., which are esteemed for their neatness, may be mentioned:

== Portraits ==
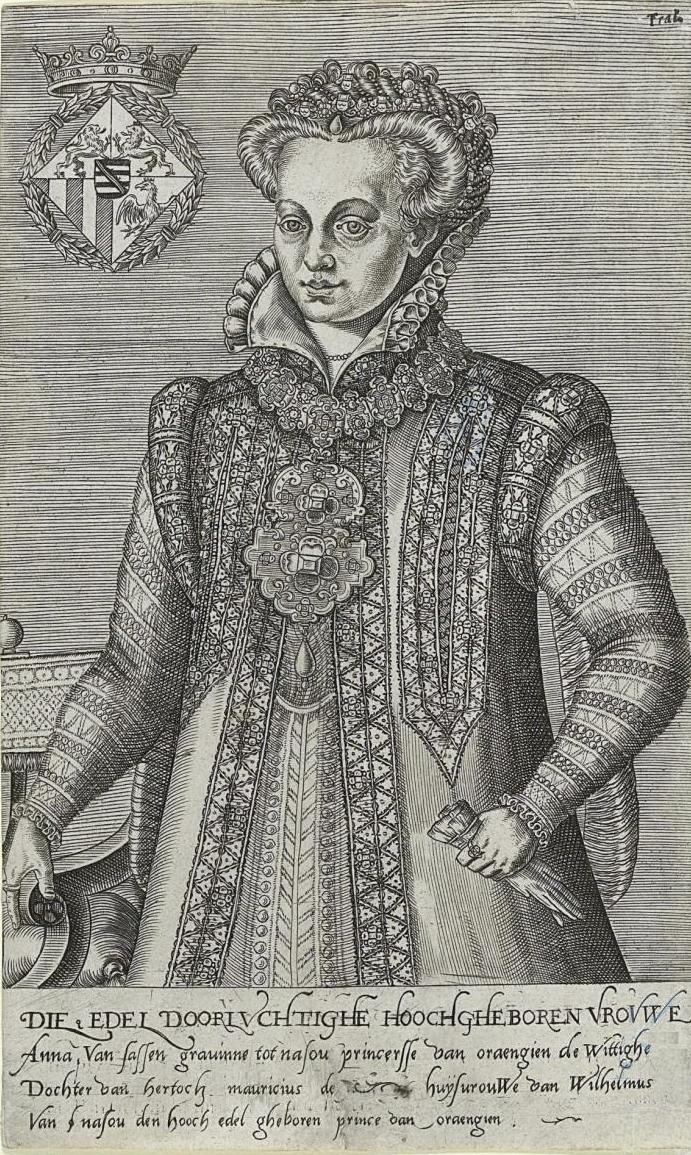
Anna of Saxony

- Philip Louis, Elector Palatine.
- Anne, his consort.
- Albert Frederick, Duke of Prussia.
- Eleonora, his Duchess.
- William, Duke of Juliers.
- Mary, his Duchess.
- John Sambucus, physician; a woodcut.
- Charles IX, King of France.
- Anna, daughter of the Emperor Charles V.

== Various subjects ==
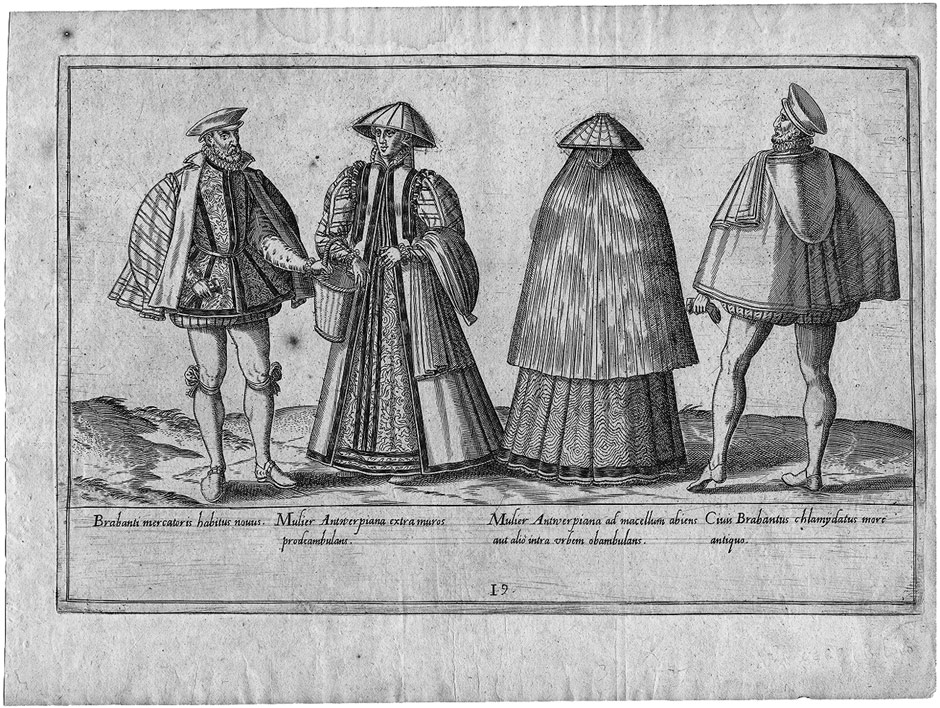
16th century costumes of merchants from Brabant and Antwerp, 1577

- Moses and the Burning Bush.
- Four plates of the Evangelists. 1578.
- Christ and the Samaritan Woman.
- A Philosopher.
- The Seven Planets. 1569.
- The Five Senses.

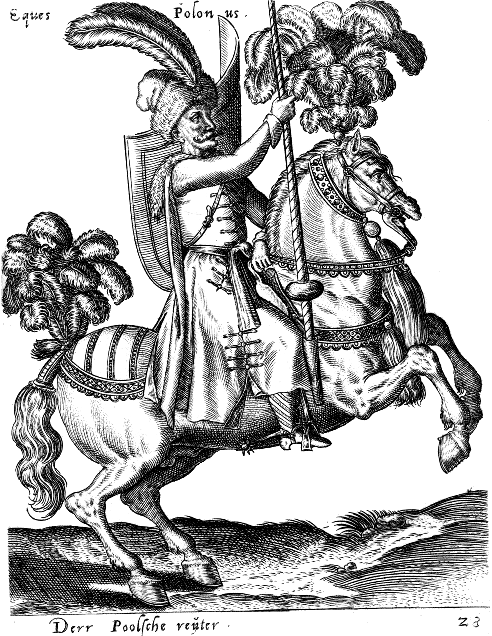
Sixteenth-century Polish trooper

- A set of one hundred plates, entitled 'Imperii ac Sacerdotii Ornatus. Diversarum item Gentium peculiaris Vestitus.' 1577–78. (His best work.) Reissued, with some additional plates, and entitled ' Omnium pene Europae, Asiae, Aphricae atque Americae Gentium Habitus.' 1581.
- Seventy-six plates of Horsemen. 1575.
- A set of small friezes of Hunting and Hawking. 1565.
- A set of twelve plates of Animals. 1583.
- A set of Arabesque Patterns.
- Pyramus and Thisbe; after Frans Floris.
- The Resurrection of Lazarus; after Crispin van den Broeck.
