= Vierschaar =

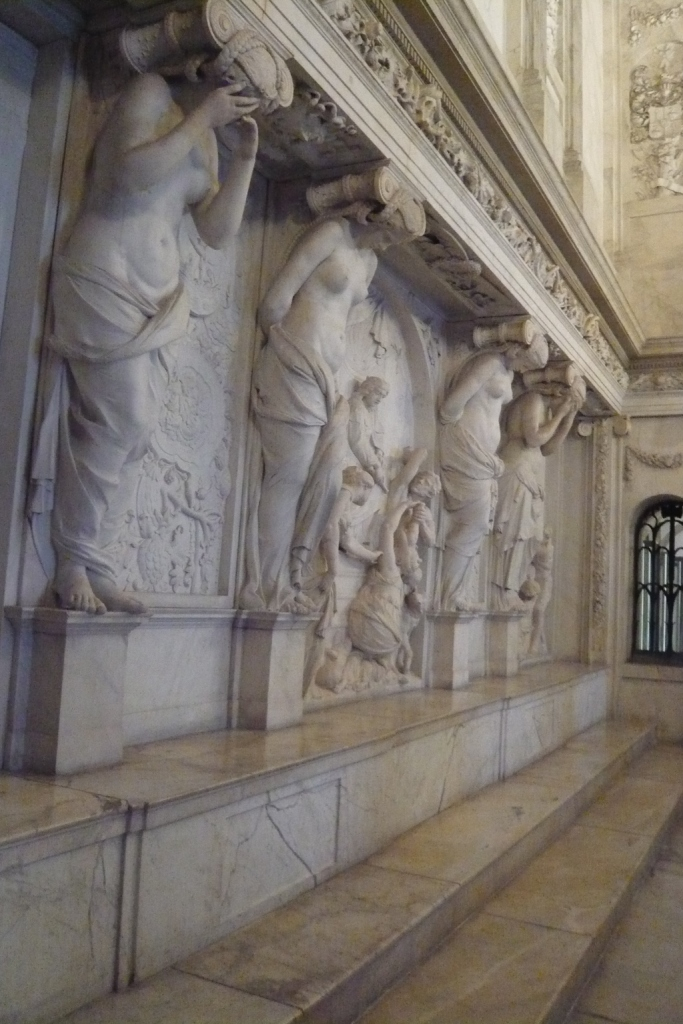
Vierschaar decoration by Artus Quellinus in the Amsterdam city hall, today the Royal Palace of Amsterdam

A Vierschaar is a historical term for a tribunal in the Netherlands. Before the separation of lawmaking, law enforcement, and justice duties, the government of every town was administered by a senate (called a Wethouderschap) formed of two, three, or sometimes four burgomasters, and a certain number of sheriffs (called Schepenen), so that the number of sitting judges was generally seven. The term Vierschaar means literally "foursquare", so called from the four-square dimensions of the benches in use by the sitting judges. The four benches for the judges were placed in a square with the defendant in the middle. This area was roped off and the term vierschaar refers to the ropes. The Dutch expression "vierschaar spannen" refers to the tightening or raising of these ropes before the proceedings could begin. (Accompanied by the question whether the sun is high enough, 'hoog genoeg op de dag', since the practice stems from the Middle Ages when these trials were held outdoors.) Most towns had the Vierschaar privilege to hear their own disputes, and the meeting room used for this was usually located in the town hall. Many historic town halls still have such a room, usually decorated with scenes from the Judgment of Solomon.
