= Nicolaes Latombe =

Dutch painter

Nicolaes Latombe (1616, Amsterdam – 1676, Amsterdam), was a Dutch Golden Age painter.

== Biography ==
According to Houbraken he travelled to Rome where he joined the Bentvueghels with the nickname "Stoppertje", because he made a point of taking out his pipe and "stopping" it with tobacco whenever he met his fellows from the Netherlands. He specialized in Italianate landscapes with grottos and ruines, populated with villagers or mountain workers, and so forth. He returned to Amsterdam in his old age. His brother was an art collector who love of paintings and prints resulted in a Rembrandt print being named after him called "Latombe's print".

According to the RKD he is known for Italianate landscapes and architectural studies.
