= Hendrick Aerts =

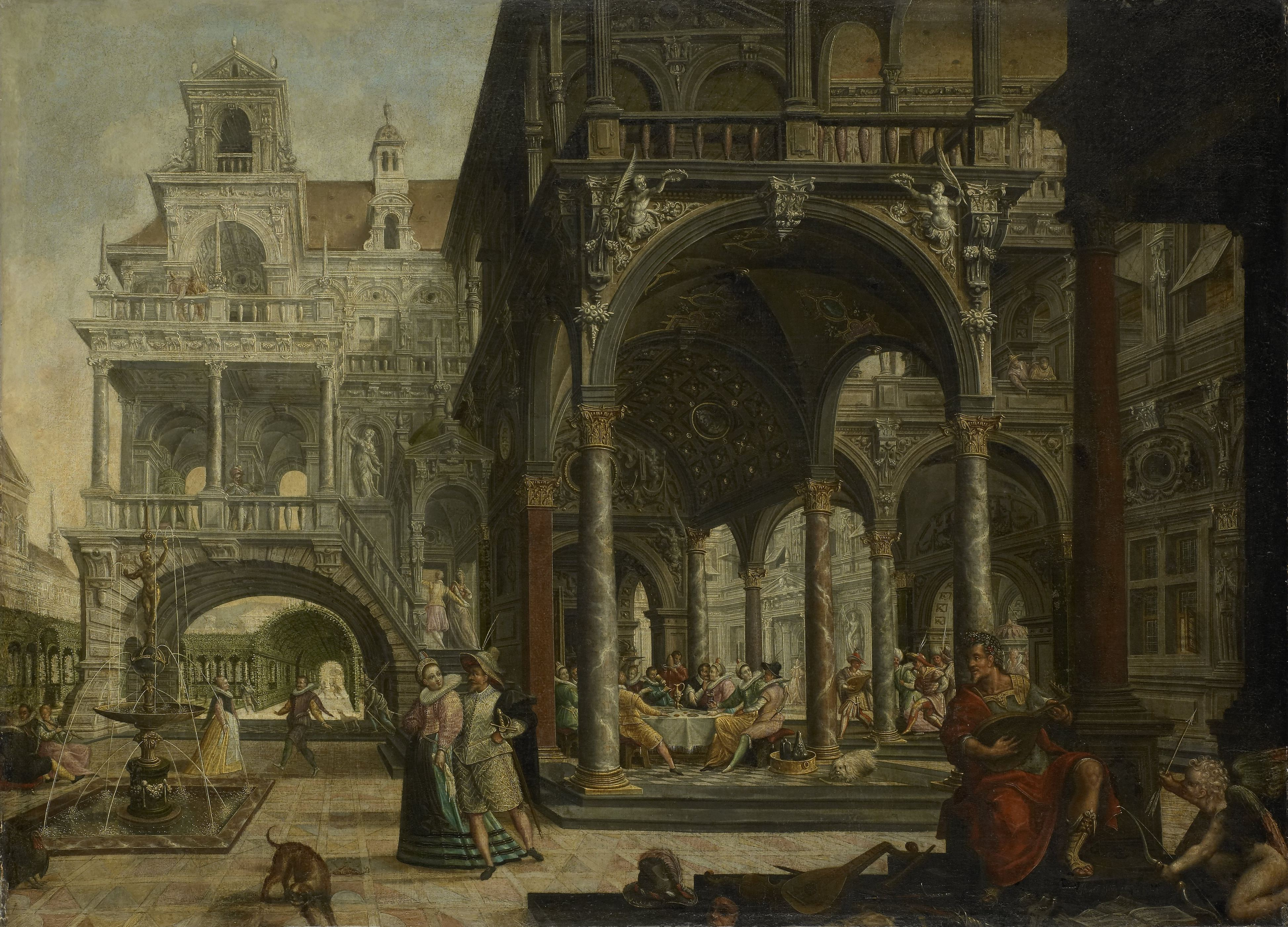
David observes the toilet of Bathsheba

Hendrick Aerts (alternative names: Hendrick Aertsz., Henricus Arijssel, Hendrik Arts, Henricus A. Rijssel) (probably Mechelen, between 1565 and 1575 – probably Gdańsk, January 1603) was a Flemish painter and draftsman who painted mainly architectural paintings of existing or imaginary structures, with figures. He was active in Gdańsk and Prague.

== Life ==
Little is known about the origins, formation and life of Hendrick Aerts. It was originally assumed that he was from Lille, which at the presumed time of his birth was part of the Spanish Netherlands. Recent research, in particular that conducted by Bernard M. Vermet, has questioned the previous assumptions about the life of the artist. Aerts is now assumed to be a native of Mechelen and that he was born there as the son of Jacob Aerts and Elisabeth van Egheem.

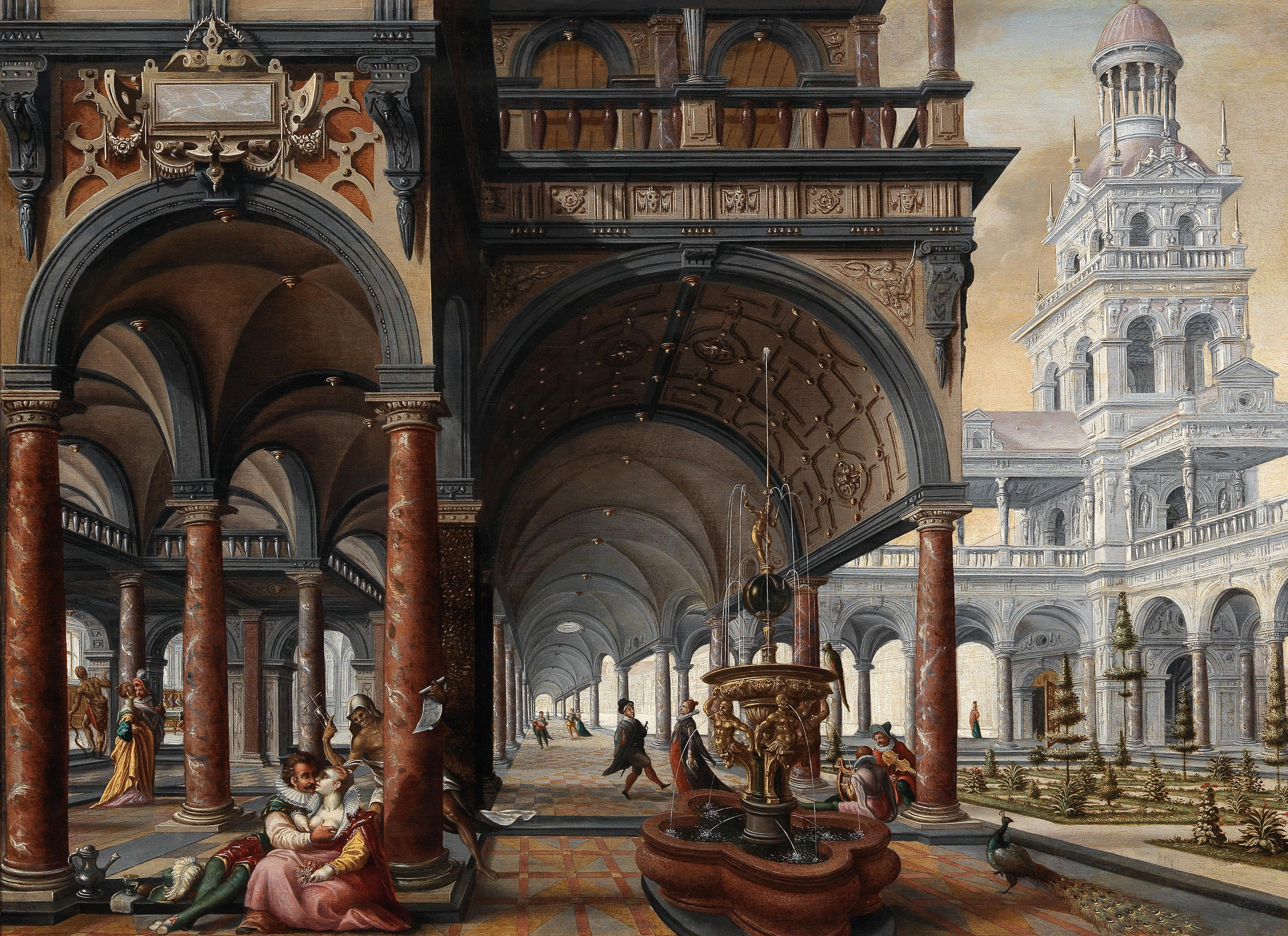
Allegory of Love and Death

Vermet has further suggested that the clear influence of the work of the Flemish architecture painter Paul Vredeman de Vries is likely due to Aerts having been a pupil of Paul Vredeman de Vries. The training probably took place when both artists resided in Gdańsk in the period from 1592 to 1595. Aerts would then have accompanied Vredeman de Vries to Prague from 1596 to 1599, where he worked as his assistant in the decoration of the ceilings and the reception rooms of Emperor Rudolf II's castle.

From 1599 Aerts may have returned to Gdańsk, where he probably died in 1603.

== Work ==
Only a few paintings of Hendrick Aerts have been preserved. Research attributes less than ten paintings to him. The earliest reliable work is dated 1600 and the last known work 1602.

Like his presumed master Paul Vredeman de Vries, he mostly painted fantastic architectural works of imaginary and luxurious palaces and church interiors, in which the human figures often represent allegories. He also painted a view of the interior of a church, presumably the Archbasilica of Saint John Lateran in Rome. Jan van Londerseel's print made before 1608-1609 after Aerts' painting was used by a number of artists as a model for further paintings of that church interior.

== Known works ==
- Amsterdam, Rijksmuseum
  - Imaginary renaissance palace. 1602
- Braunschweig, Herzog Anton Ulrich Museum
  - Interior of a Gothic church.
- The Hague, Museum Bredius
  - Allegory of death. 1602
- Whereabouts unknown
  - Allegory of love and death. c. 1600/01 (2002 in Paris, Galerie De Jonckheere)
  - Marketplace. (until at least 1913 in a private collection in Schwedt an den Oder)
  - Interior of a Gothic church. (attributed - auctioned on 7 June 1994 by the Dorotheum in Vienna)
  - The inside of a cathedral with procession. (on 5 July 2000 auctioned by Bonhams Knightsbridge)

== Literature ==
- Bernard M. Vermet, Hendrick Aerts, Gentse Bijdragen tot de Kunstgeschiedenis en Oudheidkunde, 30 (1995), S. 107-118
- Bernard M. Vermet, Architektuurschilders in Dantzig. Hendrick Aerts en Hans en Paul Vredeman de Vries, Gentse Bijdragen tot de Kunstgeschiedenis en Oudheidkunde, 31 (1996), S. 27-57
- Jan Briels, Vlaamse schilders en de dageraad van Hollands Gouden Eeuw 1585-1630, Antwerpen 1997, S. 292
- Hendrick Aerts. In: Ulrich Thieme, Felix Becker u. a.: Allgemeines Lexikon der Bildenden Künstler von der Antike bis zur Gegenwart. Band 2, Wilhelm Engelmann, Leipzig 1908, S. 165.
- Hendrick Aerts. In: Allgemeines Künstlerlexikon. Die Bildenden Künstler aller Zeiten und Völker (AKL). Band 5, Saur, München u.a. 1992, ISBN 3-598-22745-0, S. 341f
- G.L.M. Daniëls, Kerkgeschiedenis en politiek in het perspectief van Hendrick Aerts, Antiek 9 (1974-1975), S. 63-69
