= Schouten =

Schouten is a surname of Dutch origin. It generally has an occupational root, where the forebear was a schout, but can also be patronymic, as Schoute once was used as a given name. The name is quite common in the Netherlands, ranking 37th in 2007 (17,626 people). Variations include Schout, Schoute, Schoutens, Scholten and Scholte. People with this surname include:

- Bernardus Dominicus Schouten (born 1979), Dutch Commander G550
- Ank Bijleveld-Schouten (born 1962), Dutch politician
- Antoine Schouten (born 1946), Canadian field hockey player
- Bart Schouten (born 1967), Dutch speedskating coach
- Bas Schouten (born 1994), Dutch racing driver
- Bryan Schouten (born 1994), Dutch motorcycle racer
- Carola Schouten (born 1977), Dutch politician
- Dirk Bernard Joseph Schouten (1923–2018), Dutch economist
- Erik Schouten (born 1991), Dutch footballer
- Esther Schouten (born 1977), Dutch boxer
- Gerrit Schouten (1779–1839), Surinamese diorama artist
- Henk Schouten (1932–2018), Dutch footballer
- Irene Schouten (born 1992), Dutch speed skater
- Jaap Schouten (born 1984), Dutch rower
- Jan Arnoldus Schouten (1883–1971), Dutch mathematician
- Jan Frederik Schouten (1910–1980), Dutch physician
- Jerdy Schouten (born 1997), Dutch footballer
- Johanna Schouten-Elsenhout (1910–1992), Surinamese poet
- Joost Schouten (c.1600–1640), Member of the Council of the Dutch East India Company
- Lydia Schouten (born 1948), Dutch performance and video artist
- Peter Schouten, Australian illustrator in the field of zoology and palaeontology.
- Pieter Schouten (fl. 1622–1625), Dutch corsair and privateer
- Raymond Schouten (born 1985), Dutch motorcycle racer
- Willem Schouten (c. 1567–1625), Dutch explorer and circumnavigator who named Cape Horn
- Wim Schouten (1878–1941), Dutch Olympic sailor
- Wouter Schouten (1638–1704), Dutch physician and travel writer

Schoute

- Pieter Hendrik Schoute (1846–1913), Dutch mathematician

Schout

- Pieter Jacobsz Schout (1570–1645), Dutch mayor of Haarlem.
- Members of the Haarlem schutterij portrayed by Frans Hals between 1616 and 1639, including Cornelis Jacobsz Schout, Jacob Cornelisz Schout, Loth Schout, and Pieter Schout

== Named after a Schouten ==
- Islands:
  - Schouten Island, island in Tasmania named after Joost Schouten
  - Schouten Islands or Biak Islands or Geelvink Islands, in Indonesia, north of New Guinea, named after Willem Schouten, who visited them in 1616
  - Schouten Islands or Eastern Schouten Islands or Le Maire Islands, of Papua New Guinea, named after Willem Schouten, who visited them in 1616
    - Schouten languages, spoken on and near the Schouten Islands of Papua New Guinea
- 11773 Schouten, a main-belt asteroid named after Willem Schouten
- Mathematics (named after Jan Arnoldus Schouten)
  - Schouten tensor, a mathematical object related to differential geometry
  - Schouten–Nijenhuis bracket, mathematical operator
  - Weyl–Schouten theorem
- Schoutenia, a plant genus named after the explorer Willem Schouten
- J.F. Schouten School for User System Interaction named after Jan Frederik Schouten

== See also ==
- Scholten
