= Schout (surname) =

Schout is a Dutch surname derived from the former occupation of schout, local official appointed to carry out administrative, law enforcement and prosecutorial tasks. Notable people with this surname include:

- Cornelis Jacobsz Schout (c.1570 – after 1621), was a Dutch Golden Age member of the Haarlem schutterij
- Jacob Cornelisz Schout (c.1600 – after 1627), was a Dutch Golden Age member of the Haarlem schutterij
- Loth Schout (1600 – 1655), was a Dutch Golden Age brewer of Haarlem
- Pieter Schout (c1610 – after 1648), was a Dutch Golden Age member of the Haarlem schutterij
- Pieter Jacobsz Schout (1570–1645), was a Dutch Golden Age mayor of Haarlem
