= The Banquet of the Officers of the St George Militia Company =

The Banquet of the Officers of the St George Militia Company may refer to two paintings by Frans Hals:

- The Banquet of the Officers of the St George Militia Company in 1616
- The Banquet of the Officers of the St George Militia Company in 1627

== See also ==
- The Officers of the St George Militia Company in 1639
