= Verbeek =

Verbeek is a surname of Dutch origin. The name is a contraction of the toponym Van der Beek, meaning "from/of the creek". Besides a location near a stream, the original bearer may have been from a place called Beek. In the Netherlands 9,775 people carried the name in 2007, making it the 100st most common surname. Notable people with this surname include:

- Alexandra Verbeek (born 1973), Dutch competitive sailor
- Danny Verbeek (born 1990), Dutch football winger
- Dirk Verbeek, South African Army general, Chief of Staff Intelligence 1994
- Ellen Verbeek (born 1958), Dutch journalist and editor
- Frans Verbeek (1510–1570), Flemish painter and draughtsman (usually spelled "Verbeeck")
- Esther Verbeek (1931–2018), Flemish television presenter known as Aunt Terry
- Gertjan Verbeek (born 1962), Dutch football defender and manager
- Grace Verbeek (born 1958), Canadian middle-distance runner
- Guido Verbeck (1830–1898) (born "Verbeek"), Dutch political advisor, educator, and missionary in Japan
- Gustave Verbeek (or Verbeck) (1867–1937), Dutch-American illustrator and newspaper cartoonist, son of Guido.
- Hans Verbeek (1873–1954), German architect and city planner
- Herman Verbeek (1936–2013), Dutch priest and politician
- Leen Verbeek (born 1955), Dutch entrepreneur and Labour Party politician
- Lotte Verbeek (born 1982), Dutch actress, dancer and model
- Nicolaes Verbeek (1582–1637), Dutch brewer in Haarlem portrayed by Frans Hals
- Pat Verbeek (born 1964), Canadian-born US ice hockey player
- Peter-Paul Verbeek (born 1970), Dutch philosopher
- Pieter Adriaensz Verbeek (1575–1637), Dutch mayor of Haarlem portrayed by Frans Hals
- Pim Verbeek (1956–2019), Dutch football manager, coach of the Australia national team
- Rick Verbeek (born 1988), Dutch football midfielder
- Robert Verbeek (born 1961), Dutch football manager
- Rogier Verbeek (1845–1926), Dutch geologist and nature scientist
- Sem Verbeek (born 1994), Dutch tennis player
- Simon Verbeek (born 1967), Australian rules footballer
- Tonya Verbeek (born 1977), Canadian freestyle wrestler

== See also ==
- Van Beek
- Van der Beek
- Vanderbeek
- Verbeeck
- Verbeke
