= Van Beek =

Van Beek is a toponymic surname of (southern) Dutch origin. Though translating as "of the stream", the absence of an article suggests that the original bearer originated from a town called Beek rather than lived near a stream. There are several towns which are or were named Beek in Gelderland, Limburg and North Brabant and also one in the municipality Bree in Belgium near the Dutch border. The name is quite common in the Netherlands, ranking 38th in 2007 (17,148 people). Related names include Beek, Van Beeck, Ter Beek, Van der Beek, and Verbeek. People with this surname include:

- Arie van Beek (b. 1951), Dutch conductor
- Bernard van Beek (1875–1941), Dutch landscape painter
- Gijs van Beek (born 1971), Dutch sport shooter
- Gys van Beek (1919–2015), Dutch resistance member and American inventor
- Harold van Beek (b. 1962), Dutch racewalker
- Jackie van Beek, New Zealand film director, writer and actress
- Jan van Beek (1880–1954), Dutch footballer
- Logan van Beek (b. 1990), New Zealand-born Dutch cricketer
- Lotte van Beek (b. 1991), Dutch speed skater
- Martin van Beek (b. 1960), Dutch politician
- Rinus van Beek (1947–2018), Dutch swimmer
- Rob Van Beek (b. 1983), Canadian lacrosse player
- Sven van Beek (b. 1994), Dutch footballer
- Svenja van Beek (b. 1987), Dutch pop singer
- Willibrord van Beek (b. 1949), Dutch politician

Bontjes van Beek

- Cato Bontjes van Beek (1920–1943), German resistance member

Van Beeck

- Franz Jozef van Beeck (1930–2011), Dutch Jesuit theologian

Von Beeck

- Peter von Beeck (died 1624), German (Aachen) historian

== See also ==
- Beek (disambiguation)
- Van der Beek, Dutch surname
