= Scholten =

Scholten is a surname of Dutch origin and a variant of the name Schouten. It may refer to:

- Arnold Scholten (born 1962), Dutch professional football player
- Carel S. Scholten (1925–2009), Dutch physicist and pioneer of computing, a.o. known for the Dijkstra–Scholten algorithm
- Clemens Scholten (born 1955), German theologian
- Daniel Scholten (born 1973), Germano-Icelandic novelist and linguist
- Dominique Scholten (born 1988), Dutch professional football player
- Frank Scholten (1881–1942), Dutch photographer and author
- Frederik von Scholten (1796–1853), Danish naval officer
- Frits Scholten (born 1959), Dutch art historian
- Gabe Scholten (1921–1997), Dutch sprinter
- Gijs Scholten van Aschat (born 1959), Dutch actor
- Hendrik Jacobus Scholten (1824–1907), Dutch painter
- Hillary Scholten (born 1982), American politician
- J. D. Scholten (born 1980), American baseball player and politician
- Jan Hendrik Scholten (1811–1885), Dutch Protestant theologian
- Jan Nico Scholten (1932–2026), Dutch politician
- Jeff Scholten (born 1977), Canadian short track speed skater
- Jim Scholten (born 1952), American bassist for Sawyer Brown
- Martha Young-Scholten, American linguist
- Marzio Scholten (born 1982), Dutch jazz guitarist and composer
- Matt Scholten (born 1980s), Australian theatre director
- Peter von Scholten (1784–1854), Danish governor-general of the Danish West Indies 1827–48
- Reinout Scholten van Aschat (born 1989), Dutch actor
- Roland Scholten (born 1965), Dutch championship darts player
- Teddy Scholten (1926–2010), Dutch pop singer
- Théo Scholten (born 1963), Luxembourgian footballer
- Willem Albert Scholten (1819–1892), founder of Dutch starch manufacturer AVEBE
- Willem Scholten (1927–2005), Dutch politician
- Ynso Scholten (1918–1984), Dutch politician

== See also ==
- Schouten
