= Cunera van Baersdorp =

Painting by Frans Hals

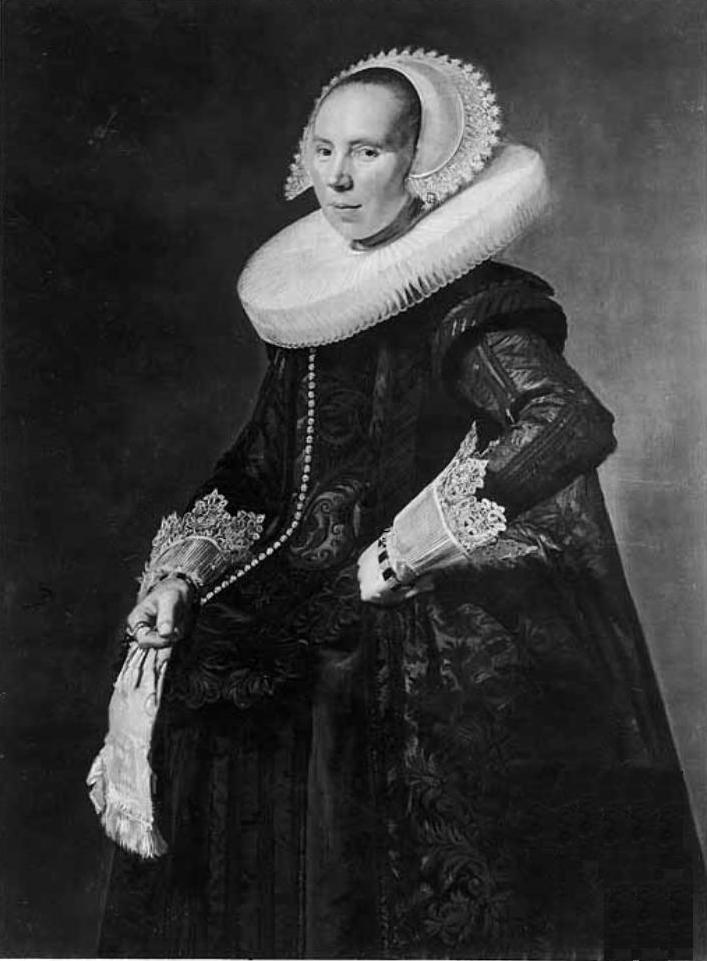
- Portrait of Cunera van Baersdorp, 1625, oil on panel, 116.7 x 91.5 cm
- Artist: Frans Hals
- Year: 1625
- Catalogue: Hofstede de Groot, Catalog 1910: #374
- Medium: Oil on panel
- Dimensions: 116.7 cm × 91.5 cm (45.9 in × 36.0 in)
- Owner: Private collection

Portrait of Cunera van Baersdorp is an oil-on-panel painting by the Dutch Golden Age artist Frans Hals. It was painted in 1625 and now in a private collection. It is considered to be a pendant portrait to Portrait of a Man Standing, which is now identified as Cunera van Baersdorp's husband Michiel de Wael.

== Life ==
Cunera van Baersdorp was born in Leiden in 1600, the daughter of the Leiden mayor Jan Jans van Baersdorp and Dirckgen Claes van Heemskerk. Her older brother Jan married in Amsterdam and it is there that she met Michiel de Wael who she became engaged to in Haarlem on 2 April 1625. She had probably been living in Amsterdam with her mother and brother since her father's death in Leiden in 1614. Her mother died in Amsterdam in October 1624 and was buried in the Oude Kerk.

Cunera van Baersdorp and Michiel de Wael ran a brewery in Haarlem. They remained in contact with her brother Jan; Michiel was registered at the baptism of his youngest daughter Aeffjen van Baersdorp on 8 June 1631 in the Oude Kerk. She died in Haarlem in 1640.

== Painting ==
The portrait was dated around 1635–1638, but since 2012 it has been attributed as a wedding pendant and thus is dated 1625. Similar to Hals' Portrait of a Woman Standing in Chatsworth House, the woman is wearing a wedding ring on her right forefinger, a figure-eight collar and lace wrist collars over sleeves that match her bodice, and a vlieger over a wheel-shaped fardegalijn. Her diadem cap lacks wings however and is more similar to the cap worn by Hals's Catholic sitter Catharina Both-van der Eem and by his brewer Aletta Hannemans. Unlike her colleague Haarlem brewer Hannemans, who is wearing a colorful skirt and ornamented wedding stomacher, Van Baersdorp is wearing a black skirt and her bracelets are black and white, which together possibly indicate mourning, probably for her mother. Also like Hannemans, she is holding a wedding glove. Her stance with arm akimbo is striking and, though men in Hals wedding pendant portraiture often take this pose, Van Baersdorp is the only known woman in his oeuvre to stand this way. Her portrait was documented by Hofstede de Groot in 1910, who wrote:

391. PORTRAIT OF A DUTCHWOMAN STANDING. M. 195. Three-quarter-length. She is turned three-quarters left, and looks at the spectator. Her left hand rests on her hip; her right hand holds a glove. She wears a black silk dress with a flowered pattern, a white lace-trimmed cap, a broad ruff, and lace wristbands. Canvas on panel, 46 inches by 36 inches. In the possession of the Paris dealer C. Sedelmeyer, "Catalogue of 100 Paintings," 1899, No. 19. In the collection of the Marquis de Ganay, Paris.

Hofstede de Groot did not identify it as a pendant of Van Baersdorp's portrait, but he wrote of Michiel's portrait:

242. MICHIEL DE WAEL (?). B. 73; M. 83. Three-quarter-length, life size. He is seen in full face, and looks at the spectator. His right hand holds his gloves; his left hand is pressed on his hip. He is in black with a broad-brimmed black hat. He has a fresh and ruddy face. Brown background. On the bottom of the frame is a coat-of-arms, bearing a bird facing right on clouds. On the top of the frame is a monogram composed of the letters, C, H, R, and G. There is apparently no evidence for the identification of the sitter as M. de Wael. [Pendant to 243. Compare 282.] Canvas, 47 inches by 30 inches. See Moes, lconographia Batava, No. 8794, 3. Engraved by Achille Gilbert in the collection of C. Fillet. Exhibited at the Royal Academy Winter Exhibition, London, 1902, No. 101. Sale. (Supplementary) Utrecht, June 27, 1825, No. 153 (200 florins, with pendant). In the collection of Charles Fillet, Paris. In the possession of the London dealers Lawrie. In the collection of Arthur Sanderson, Edinburgh. In the collection of Charles Taft, Cincinnati.

Oddly, the pendant that Hofstede de Groot did identify for this portrait, catalog number 243, had no distinguishing characteristics besides that the woman's hands were both visible, it was named "Cornelia van Baardorp", and it had been sold June 27 in Utrecht in 1825. This was later determined to be earlier information regarding the same portrait he included in his catalog as number 391.

In 1974, Seymour Slive listed another painting, catalog 130, as a possible pendant, based on an attribution by W.R. Valentiner, but he found it doubtful, as Van Baersdorp is portrayed in a distinctively different style with her arm akimbo. Slive agreed that her dress implies a date of 1625 but felt that fashions were worn for long periods and placed the painting on stylistic grounds in 1635. In 1989 Claus Grimm included these portraits but also did not identify them as pendants.

== Attributed (2012) Wedding Pendant ==
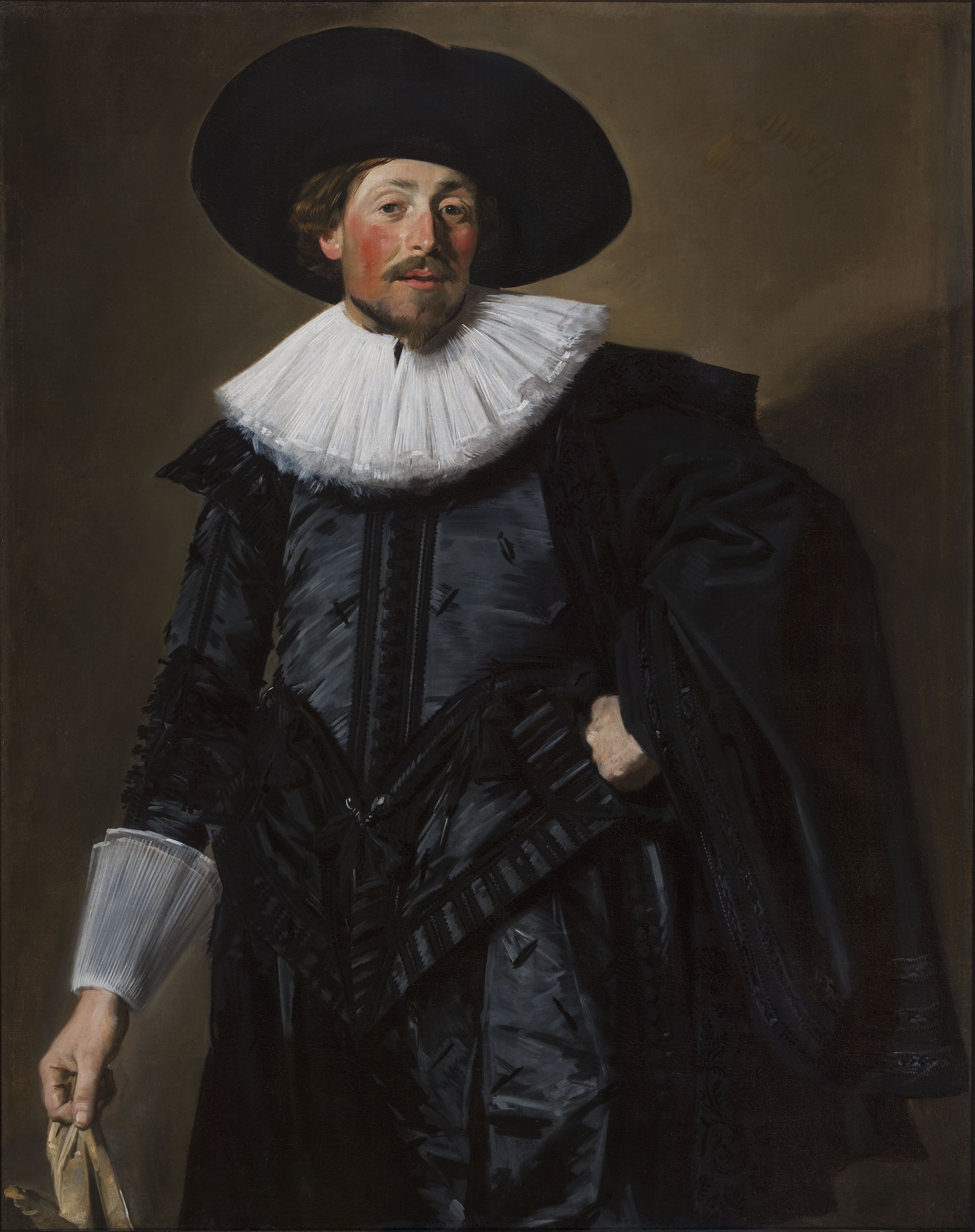

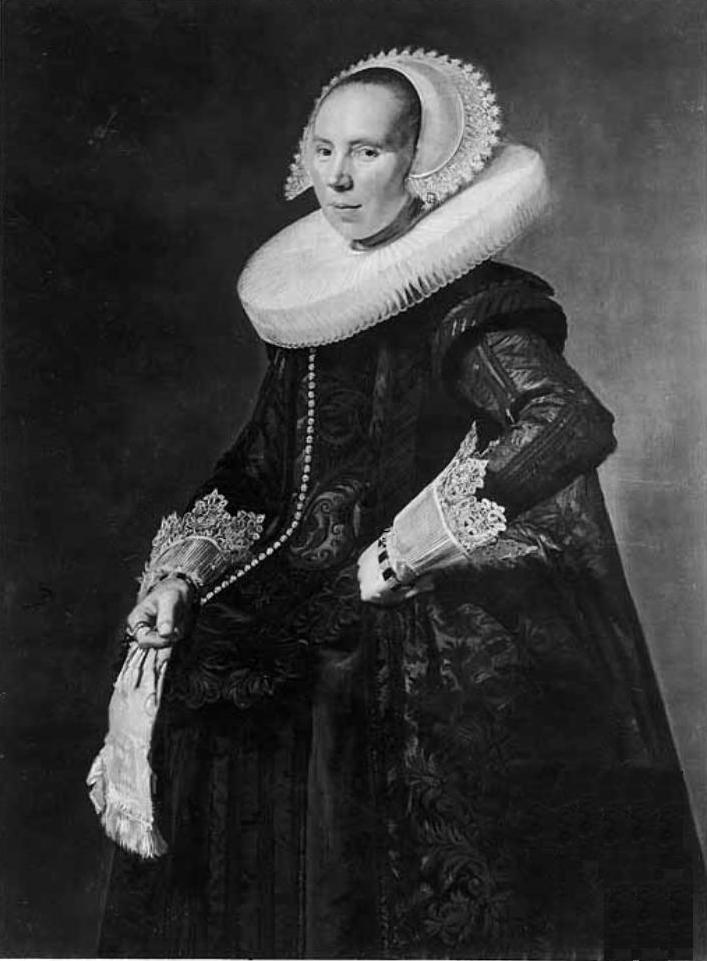

== Formerly Attributed (1923) Wedding Pendant ==
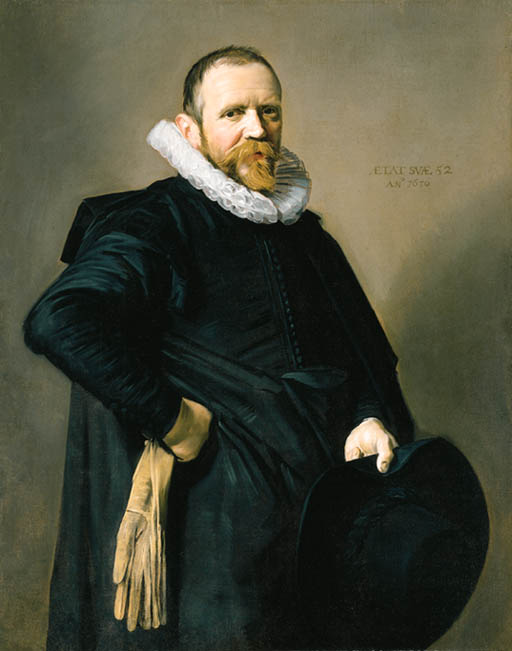

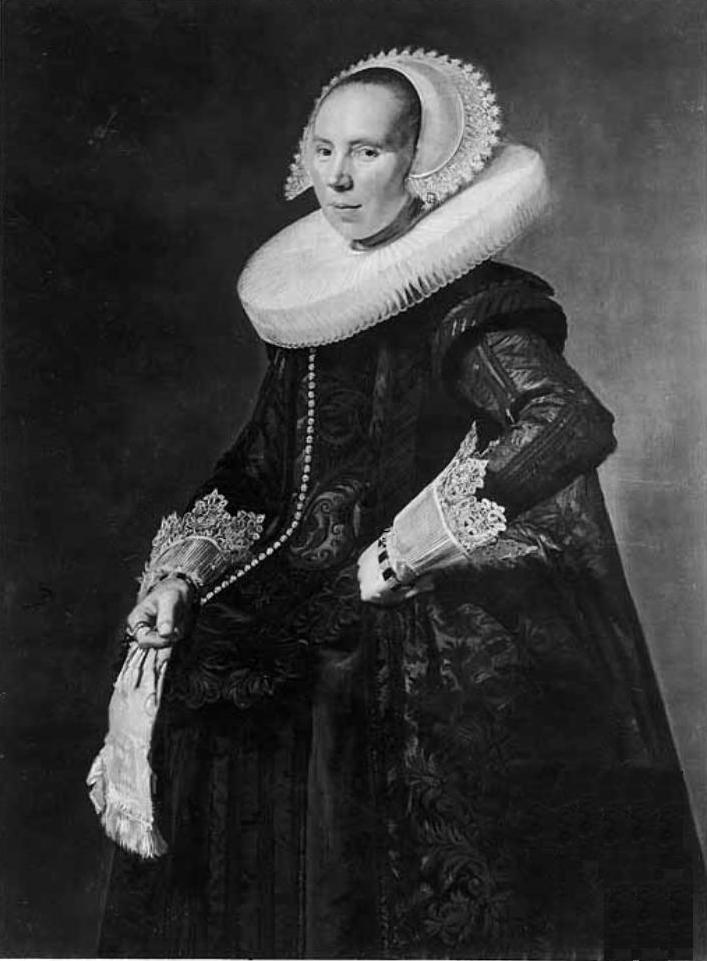

== See also ==
- List of paintings by Frans Hals
