= Verbeeck =

Verbeeck is a surname of Dutch language origin. It is a contraction and spelling variant of the toponym Van der Beek, meaning "from the stream/brook/creek". People with this surname include:. Notable people with the surname include:

- Cornelis Verbeeck (1590–1637), Dutch Golden Age painter
- Frans Verbeeck (fl 1531–1570), Flemish painter
- Frans Verbeeck (cyclist) (born 1941), Belgian cyclist
- François Xaver Henri Verbeeck (1686–1755), Flemish painter
- Katrien Verbeeck (born 1980), Belgian singer
- Maarten Verbeeck (1563–1624), Dutch Jesuit theologian (Martinus Becanus)
- Oscar Verbeeck (1891–1971), Belgian footballer
- Pieter Cornelisz Verbeeck (1610–1654), Dutch Golden Age painter
- Théo Verbeeck (1889–1951), Belgian footballer and chairman
- Yvonne Verbeeck (1913–2012), Belgian actor

== See also ==
- Verbeek
- Verbeke
