= Verbeke =

Verbeke is a Dutch toponymic surname. It is a contraction of Van der Beek, meaning "from the creek". It is particularly common in West Flanders. Notable people with the surname include:

- André Verbeke (1908–1978), Belgian architect
- Annelies Verbeke (born 1976), Belgian author and playwright
- Eleonora Verbeke (1713–1786), nun and apothecary
- Johan C. Verbeke (born 1951), Belgian politician
- Gerard Verbeke (1910–2001), Belgian philosopher and Roman Catholic priest
- Grace Verbeke (born 1984), Belgian road racing cyclist
- Harry Verbeke (1922–2004), Dutch jazz saxophonist
- Johan C. Verbeke (born 1951), Belgian diplomat, Ambassador to the UK and the US
- Kristel Verbeke (born 1975), Belgian singer, actress, and dancer
- Natalia Verbeke (born 1975), Argentine-Spanish actress
- Peter Verbeken (born 1966), Belgian racing cyclist
- Siegfried Verbeke (born 1941), Belgian neo-Nazi and Holocaust denier
- William K. Verbeke (born 1820), American politician and philanthropist

== See also ==
- Verbeek
- Verbeeck
- Jules Verbecke (1879–?), French swimmer and water polo player
