= Hugo Mattheusz Steyn =

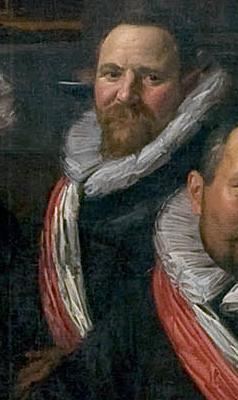
Hugo Matheusz. Steyn, detail of Hals's banquet of 1616

Hugo Matheusz. Steyn (1577 – 1632), was a Dutch Golden Age notary and member of the Haarlem schutterij.

== Biography ==
He was born in Haarlem as the son of the mayor and church warden Mattheus Steyn and Dirkje van der Graft-Gael. He was the brother of the Spaarndam toll collector Tyman Matheusz. Steyn. Hugo became the city secretary and was a member of the Catholic St. James guild (St. Jacobsgilde) and married Cornelia van der Meyde in 1606. He became lieutenant of the St. George militia in Haarlem from 1612-1615 and was captain 1618-1621. He was portrayed by Frans Hals along with his son in The Banquet of the Officers of the St George Militia Company in 1616.

He died in Haarlem.
