= Scholten (disambiguation) =

Scholten is a Dutch surname

Scholten may also refer to:

- Scholten, Missouri, an unincorporated community in Barry County, Missouri, U.S.
- Scholten, German name for the commune Cenade in Romania
- W. A. Scholten, Holland-America Line ocean liner (named after Willem Albert Scholten) that perished in the Channel in 1887

== See also ==
- Schouten (disambiguation)
