= Arent Jacobsz Koets =

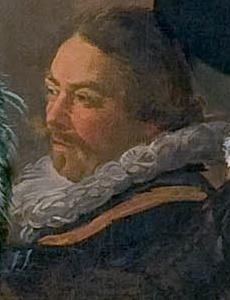
Arent Jacobsz. Koets, detail of Hals's banquet of 1627

Arent Jacobsz. Koets (c.1600 – 1 March 1635), was a Dutch Golden Age concierge of the Haarlem schutterij.

== Biography ==
He was a member of the St. James guild (St. Jacobsgilde), and married Guertje Henricksdr., the daughter of Henrick Lamberts and Meyntgen Thijmens. He was portrayed by Frans Hals in The Banquet of the Officers of the St George Militia Company in 1627.

On 1 March 1635 he was buried in Haarlem.
