= Boudewijn van Offenberg =

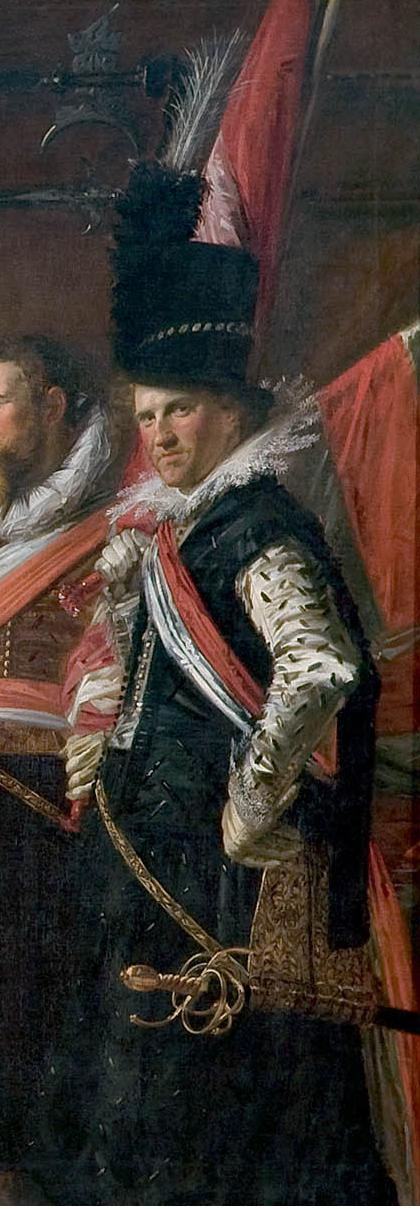
Boudewijn van Offenberg, detail of Hals's banquet of 1616

Boudewijn van Offenberg or Offenberch (1590–1653), was a Dutch Golden Age notary, merchant and member of the Haarlem schutterij.

== Biography ==
He was born in Haarlem as the son of Pieter van Offenberg, a cloth and wine merchant who relocated in Haarlem with his brothers Dirck and Lucas from Wesel via Antwerp, and Maria van Loo. Boudewijn's mother Maria van Loo and his uncle Dirck van Offenberg were the godparents of Dirck Hals in Haarlem, but the families knew each other already from their Antwerp period, because the sister of Boudewijn's grandmother Maria van Offenberg had been the godmother of Maria Hals, the older sister of Dirck and Frans, who was born in Antwerp. He married Beatrix de Laignier in 1627 and was a merchant in Haarlem, Leiden, and Bad Bentheim. He was a flag bearer of the St. George militia in Haarlem from 1612-1627 and had to resign when he got married, as Catholics were not allowed to become officers and flag bearers were bachelors. He was portrayed by Frans Hals twice, in The Banquet of the Officers of the St George Militia Company in 1616 and in The Banquet of the Officers of the St George Militia Company in 1627.

His wife Beatrix was a daughter of the "tafel houder" or "bank holder" Maximiliaan de Laignier, who ran the Bank van Lening, Haarlem. After they married they lived on the Spaarne at the spot where the house number 47 exists today. The couple moved to Leiden in 1642 where they lived on the Rapenburg at (today's) number 14 until 1652. By this time Boudewijn had become a merchant in stone and in 1652 he moved again with his family to Bentheim, where he died a year later and was mentioned in the death register as a stein händler who died of elefantiasi. The disease elephantiasis was rare, so it is possible that he was just fat, as his second portrait by Hals shows him to be considerably fatter than the first, though he was only 37 at that time. After he died, his wife and two sons moved to Oldenzaal, where his son Maximiliaan became a magistrate and his son Petrus became mayor.

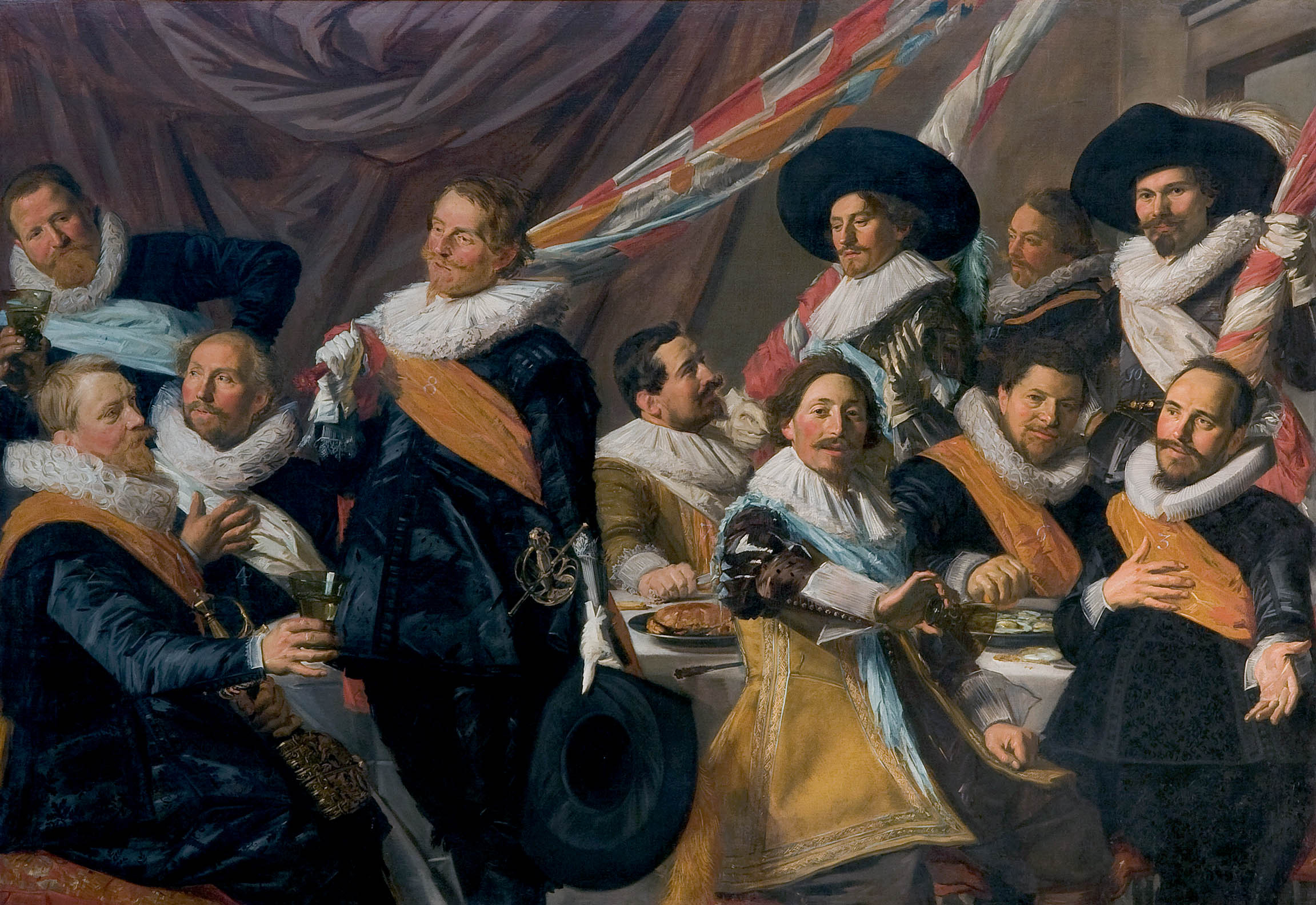
Second portrait of Van Offenberg as flag bearer aged 37, this time fatter
