= Scholte =

Scholte is a surname of Dutch origin. It generally has an occupational root, where the forebear was a '"scholte" = schout, but can also be patronymic, as Scholte once was used as a given name. People with this surname include:

- Ben Scholte (born 2001), Dutch football player
- Frederick Scholte (1865–1948), Dutch-born tailor to the Duke of Windsor
- Jan Scholte (1910–1976), Dutch water polo player
- Owen Scholte (1896–1918), English World War I flying ace
- Reinout Scholte (born 1967), Dutch cricket player
- Rob Scholte (born 1958), Dutch artist
- Suzanne Scholte (born 1959), American human rights activist
- Tom Scholte, Canadian actor

== See also ==
- Scholte railway stop
- Scholten (disambiguation)
