= Hendrick van Berckenrode =

Mayor of Haarlem

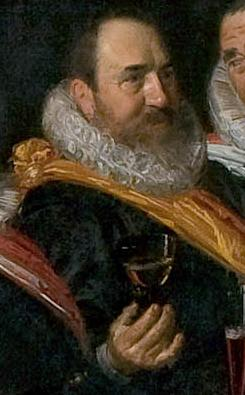
Hendrick van Berckenrode, detail of Hals's banquet of 1616

Hendrick van Berckenrode (c.1565 – 1634), was a Dutch Golden Age mayor of Haarlem.

== Biography ==
He was the son of Adriaen van Berckenrode, a Haarlem judge and mayor, and Christina van Blanckeroort. He never married and became a judge, magistrate and mayor of Haarlem like his father. He became a member of the Hoogheemraadschap van Rijnland and colonel of the St. George militia in Haarlem from 1606 to 1615, and colonel of the St. Adrian militia from 1618 to 1621. He was portrayed by Frans Hals in The Banquet of the Officers of the St George Militia Company in 1616.

He died in Haarlem as the last of the Berckenrodes of castle Berckenrode and was buried in the Grote Kerk.
