= Nicolaes Verbeek =

Dutch Golden Age brewer of Haarlem

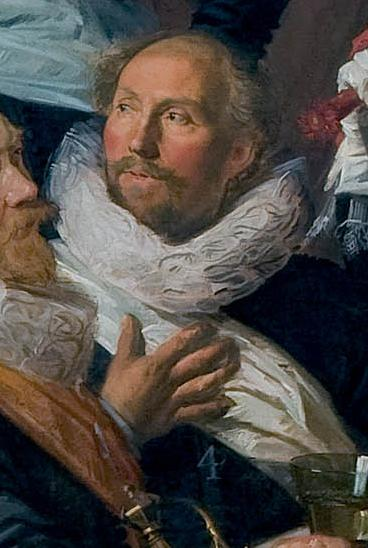
Nicolaes Adriaensz. Verbeek, detail of Hals's banquet of 1627

Nicolaes Adriaensz. Verbeek (1582–1637), was a Dutch Golden Age brewer of Haarlem.

== Biography ==
He was the son of Adriaen Thomasz. Verbeek, a Haarlem toll collector, and Hendrikje Jacobsdr. van Teylingen. He was the younger brother of Pieter Adriaensz Verbeek and became a judge and brewer in De Posthoorn. He married Geertruyd de Wael, the sister of his colleague Michiel de Wael in 1611. He became a captain of the St. George militia in Haarlem from 1624 to 1627 and from 1630 to 1633. He and his brother-in-law were portrayed by Frans Hals in The Banquet of the Officers of the St George Militia Company in 1627.

He died in Haarlem.
