= Johan van Napels =

Mayor of Haarlem

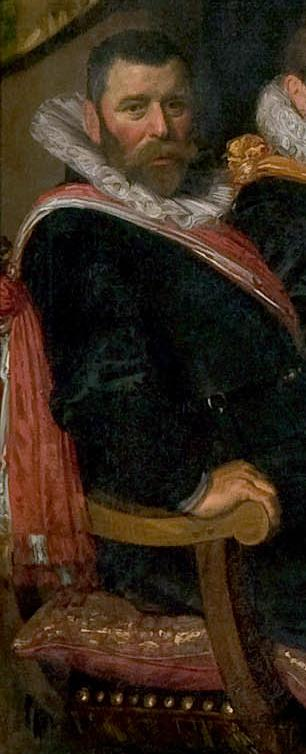
Johan van Napels, detail of Hals's banquet of 1616

Johan van Napels (1556 – 1630), was a Dutch Golden Age mayor of Haarlem.

== Biography ==
He was the son of Jan Jacobsz Koeckebacker and Duyfje van Napels. He married Adriana Bovetius in 1581 and married a second time to Catharina Zuyderhoeff. He became a judge, magistrate and mayor of Haarlem. He was lieutenant of the Haarlem combined militia from 1587 to 1588, lieutenant of the St. George militia from 1597 to 1600, captain 1606–1609, and fiscaal/provost 1609–1621. He moved to Beverwijk in 1629, but died the following year there. He was portrayed by Frans Hals in The Banquet of the Officers of the St George Militia Company in 1616.
