= Cornelis Boudewijns =

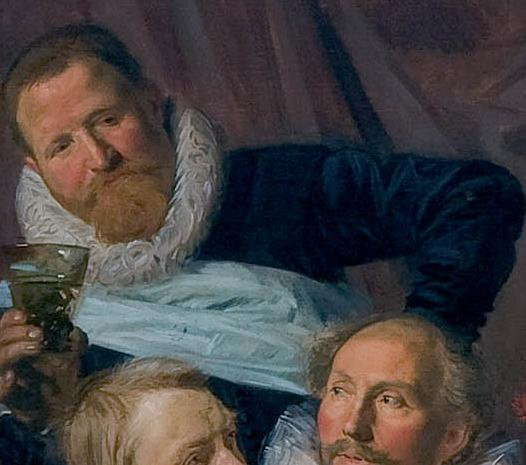
Cornelis Boudewijns, detail of Hals's banquet of 1627

Cornelis Boudewijns van Lockhorst (c. 1587 – 1635), was a Dutch Golden Age brewer of Haarlem.

== Biography ==
He was the son of Boudewijn Willemsz., a Weesp magistrate and brewer in De Sleutel in Weesp, and Hillegont Hendriksdr. van Bronckhorst. He was a brewer of the Twee Haringen and De Trompet in Haarlem. He married Aefje Willemsdr. the daughter of the brewers of the Twee Haringen, Willem Gijsbrechtsz. and Guertje Dirks who outlived him and carried on the brewery. He became a lieutenant of the St. George militia in Haarlem from 1624–1627 and from 1630–1633. He was portrayed by Frans Hals in The Banquet of the Officers of the St George Militia Company in 1627.

On 7 March 1635 he was buried in Haarlem.
