= Johan de Wael =

Dutch Golden Age mayor of Haarlem

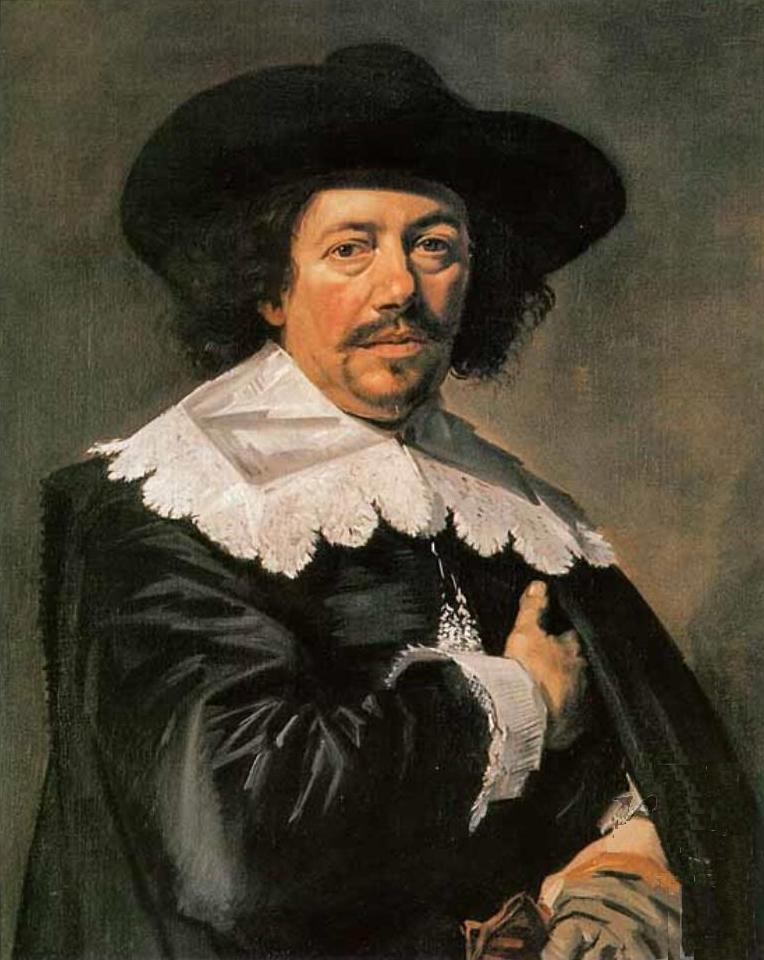
Portrait of Johan de Wael by Frans Hals, 1638

Johan de Wael (1594 – 1663), was a Dutch Golden Age mayor of Haarlem.

== Biography ==
He was born in Haarlem and together with his brother Michiel he owned the Haarlem breweries De Son and 't Roode Hart. He served as judge in 1618, magistrate in 1620, and mayor in 1627 (after that he was mayor 19 times). Frans Hals painted De Wael in a wedding pendant along with his wife Aeltje Pater of Amsterdam, whom he married in 1620. They had no issue. Her brother was a brewer and mayor of Amsterdam. De Wael was captured and taken to Loevestein in 1650 for supporting the Peace of Munster and was stripped of his appointments, but was completely reinstated a few months later after the death of William II, Prince of Orange. He died in Haarlem.

== Pendants ==
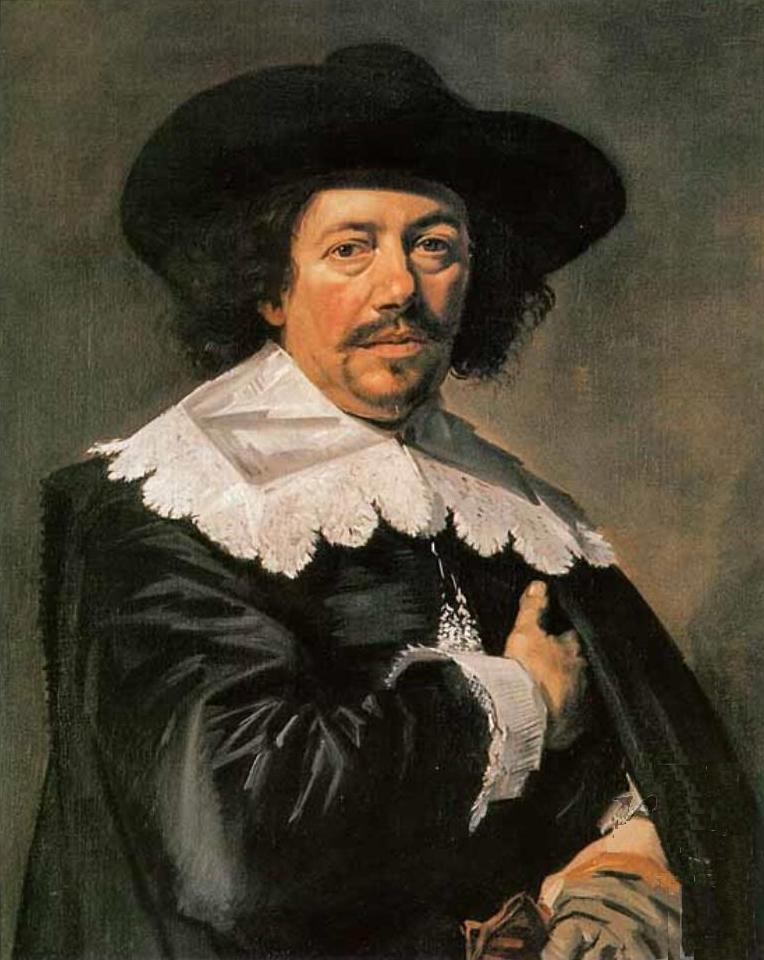

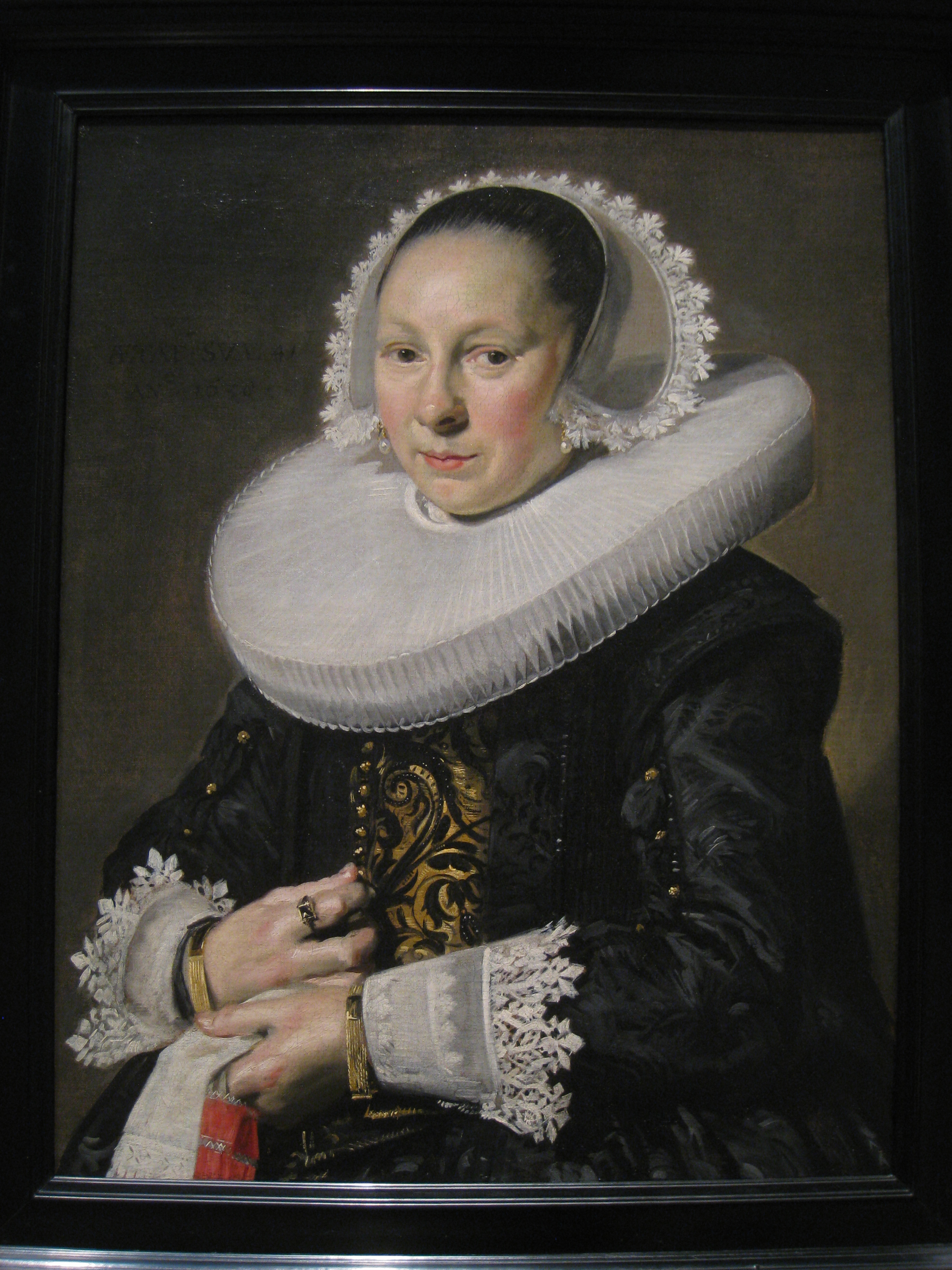
