= Nicolaes le Febure =

Dutch Golden Age mayor of Haarlem

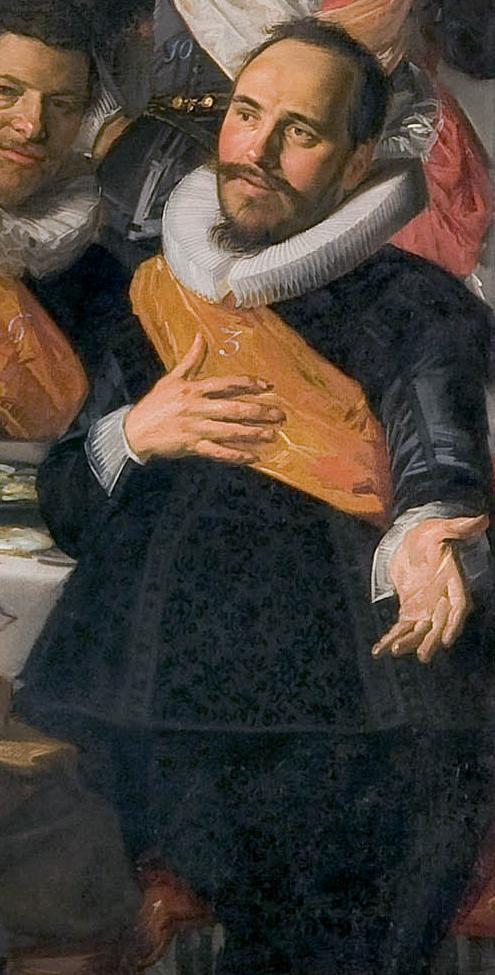
- Nicolaes le Febure, detail of Hals's banquet of 1627
- Born: 16 April 1589
- Died: 13 July 1641 (aged 52); Haarlem
- Occupation: Mayor
- Spouse: Margaretha Deyman (m. 1612)
- Parent: Mahu Nicolaesz of Herzele (father)

Nicolaes le Febure (16 April 1589 – 13 July 1641) was a Dutch Golden Age mayor of Haarlem.

== Biography ==
He was the son of Mahu Nicolaesz of Herzele, and Jannetje Gillis. He became judge, magistrate, and mayor. He married Margaretha Deyman on 22 September 1612. He was portrayed by Frans Hals in The Banquet of the Officers of the St George Militia Company in 1627. Because he was a dwarf, Hals portrayed him standing so that he appears the same height as the men sitting. The tallest man in the group was positioned behind him, however, to accentuate his stature. On 13 July 1641, he was buried in Haarlem.
