= Vechter Jansz van Teffelen =

Dutch malt maker and mayor

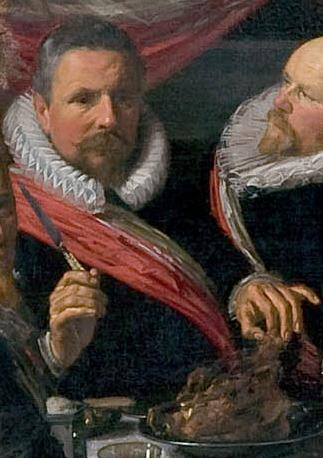
Vechter Jansz. van Teffelen, detail of Hals's banquet of 1616

Vechter Jansz. van Teffelen (1563–1619), was a Dutch Golden Age malt maker and mayor of Haarlem.

He was the son of Jan Thaemsz. and Aleyd Vechters. He married Anneke Claesdr. of Assendelft in 1601. He became a judge, magistrate and mayor of Haarlem. He was lieutenant of the St. George militia from 1606-1609, and captain 1612-1615. He was portrayed by Frans Hals in The Banquet of the Officers of the St George Militia Company in 1616.

He died in Haarlem.
