= Gerrit Cornelisz Vlasman =

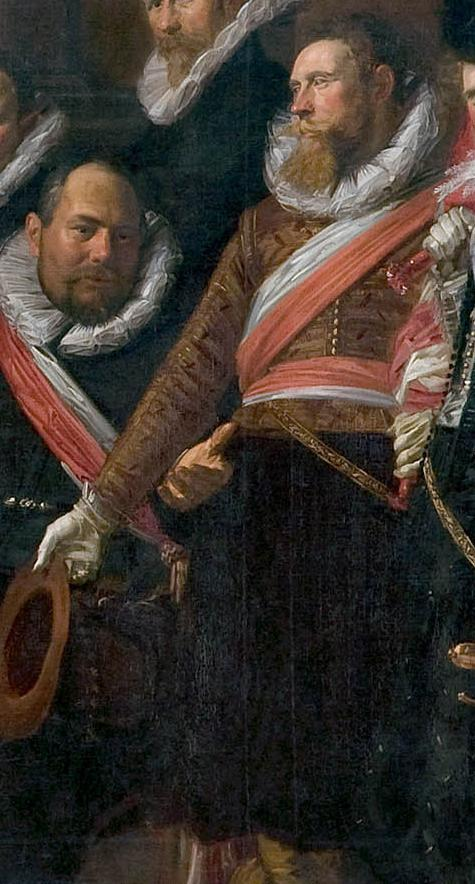
Gerrit Cornelisz. Vlasman, detail of Hals's banquet of 1616

Gerrit Cornelisz. Vlasman (before 1600 – after 1624), was a Dutch Golden Age brewer and member of the Haarlem schutterij.

== Biography ==
He was the son of Cornelis Gerritsz. Vlasman, a landowner with privileges near Sassenheim who owned the Haarlem brewery Het Zeepaard. He became a flag bearer of the St. George militia in Haarlem from 1612-1624. He was portrayed by Frans Hals in The Banquet of the Officers of the St George Militia Company in 1616.

He either died or married after 1624, as his name no longer appears in the membership lists of the St. George militia after that. He was probably related to Cornelia Jansdr. Vlasman, who married the painter Floris van Dyck in 1625.
