= Dirck Dicx =

Dutch Golden Age brewer

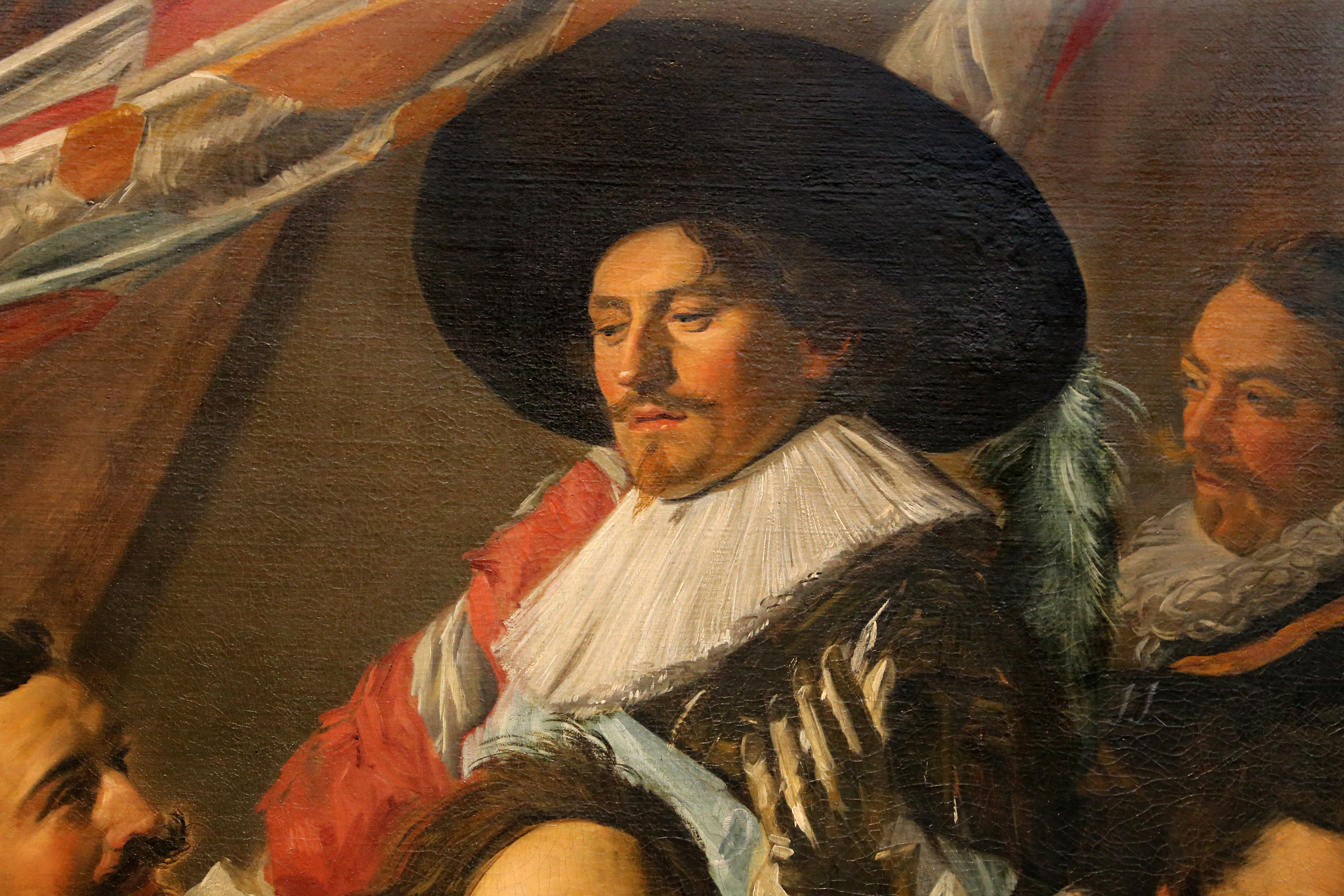
The Banquet of the Officers of the St George Militia Company in 1627

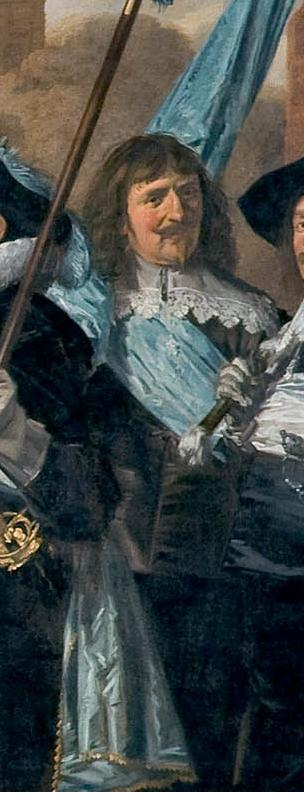
Dirck Dicx, detail of schutterstuk by Frans Hals in 1639

Dirck Dicx (1603 – before February 1654), was a Dutch Golden Age brewer from Haarlem who moved to Brazil.

== Biography ==
He was born in Haarlem as the son of the mayor by the same name who operated the brewery called Het Scheepje, Haarlem. He served in the local militia from 1626 onwards. His portrait as flag bearer of the blue brigade of the St. George militia was painted twice by Frans Hals, first in his The Banquet of the Officers of the St George Militia Company in 1627, and the second time in his The Officers of the St George Militia Company in 1639. Since it was the custom for bachelors to be flag bearers, it is presumed that he never married, as he moved to the city of Recife - Brazil in 1640. There, he brewed the very first beer of the Americas, working for John Maurice, Prince of Nassau-Siegen, Governor of the Dutch Territories in Brazil. In 1647 he was back in Haarlem, but in that year he left in the service of the Dutch East India Company (V.O.C.). He died on board the ship Walvisch, off the coast of Norway before February 1654.
