= Jacob Laurensz =

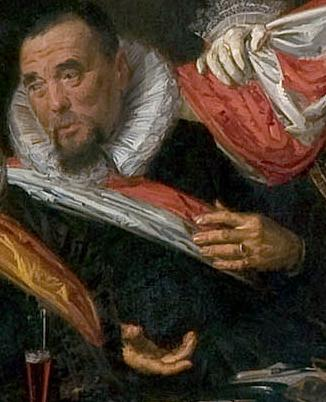
Jacob Laurensz., detail of Hals's banquet of 1616

Jacob Laurensz. (c.1560 – 1631), was a Dutch Golden Age brewer and magistrate of Haarlem.

He was owner of the Haarlem brewery "De Lely" and married Mechtelt Simonsdr. in 1584, married a second time in 1613 to Aaf Jacob Witsdr., and married a third time in 1621 to Rachel Adriaensdr. He was a judge and magistrate of Haarlem and served as captain of the St. George militia from 1612 to 1615, and colonel 1618-1621. He was portrayed by Frans Hals in The Banquet of the Officers of the St George Militia Company in 1616.

He died in Haarlem.
