= The Banquet of the Officers of the St George Militia Company in 1627 =

Painting by Frans Hals

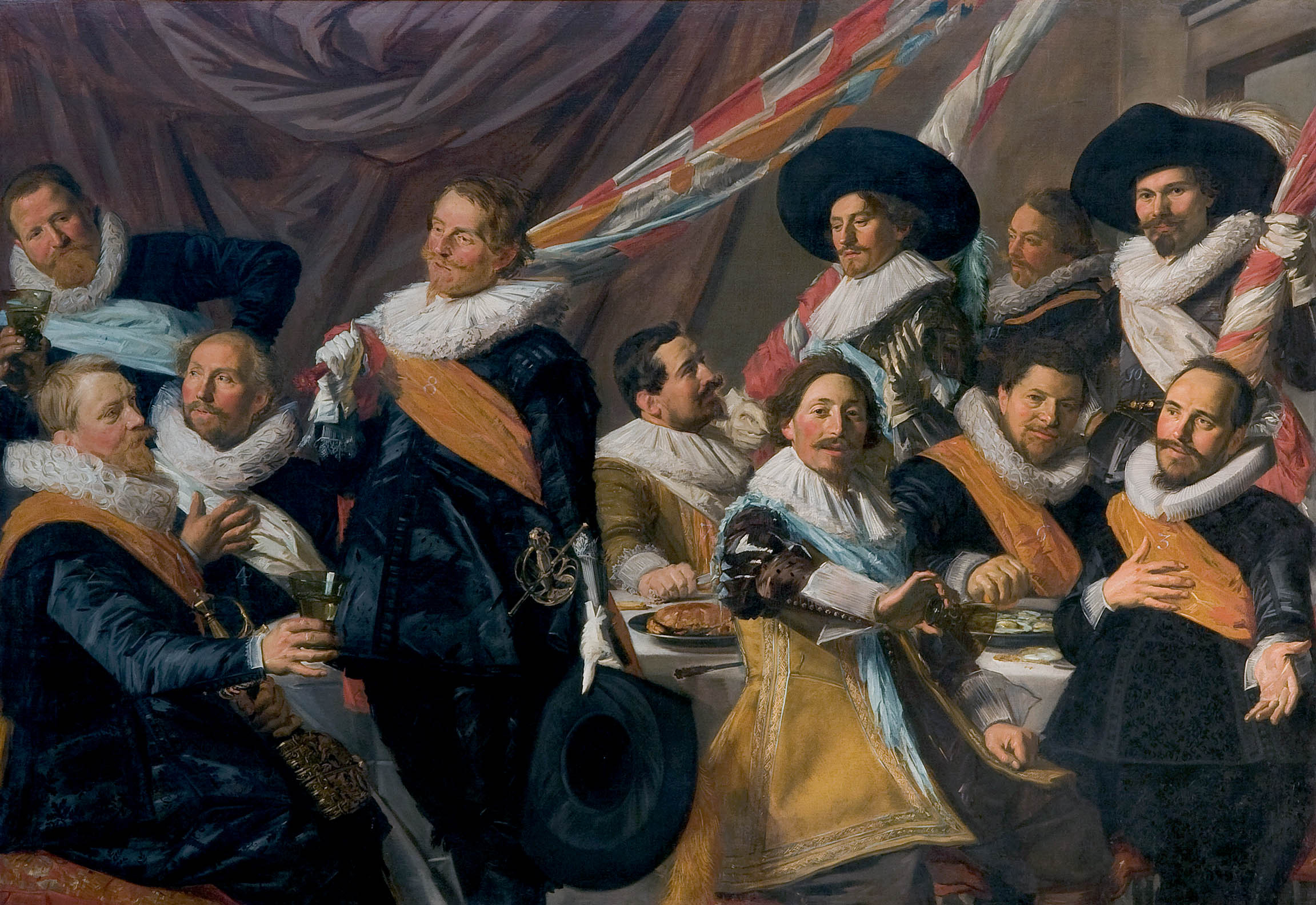
- Artist: Frans Hals
- Year: c. 1626 - 1627
- Medium: Oil on canvas
- Dimensions: 179 cm x 257.5 cm (70 1/2 in x 101 1/2 in
- Location: Frans Hals Museum, Haarlem

The Banquet of the Officers of the St George Militia Company is an oil-on-canvas painting by the Dutch artist Frans Hals, painted from 1626 - 1627, during the Dutch Golden Age. Today, the piece is considered one of the main attractions of the Frans Hals Museum.

This group portrait or schuttersstuk of the St. George (or St. Joris) civic guard of Haarlem serves as the celebration of a banquet for the officers, commemorating their end of service.

Hals' group portraiture is known for its approach to group portraits, using spontaneous and loose brushstrokes, along with his characteristic use of color, which created lively visuals and palpable interaction among the officers within the piece.

== Analysis ==
The painting consists of multiple Haarlem schutterij officers sitting near a long table in the banquet hall of St St. Jorisdoelen (now called the Proveniershuis). Each man wears a sash that represents their company; all three are represented with their flag-bearers wearing the colors orange, white or blue. The figures are varied and have a lot of implied movement. The way the officers bodies are displayed show them having interactions between one another in smaller groups while others look to the side or forward as if something that we are not seeing has their attention.

=== Identity of figures ===
At the head of the table is Colonel Aart Jansz Druyvesteyn; he wears an orange sash holding a glass of wine sitting at the table on the left, looking at Captain Michiel de Wael with an empty glass. The men featured are from left to right; Lieutenant Cornelis Boudewijns (standing above Colonel Aernout Druyvesteyn), Captain Nicolaes Verbeek, Flag bearer Boudewijn van Offenberg, Lieutenant Jacob Pietersz Olycan, Captain Michiel de Wael, and above him, standing, is Flag bearer Dirck Dicx looking down at Jacob Olycan. Just behind him in the background is the servant Arent Jacobsz Koets, and below him, seated, is Lieutenant Frederik Coning. Behind the servant in the far right, is the flag bearer Jacob Cornelisz Schout who towers above the dwarf in the lower right, Captain Nicolaes le Febure.

== Historical context ==
During the Eighty Years' War or Dutch Revolt, Dutch cities had an established network of able-bodied recruitments of militiamen to keep their cities safe. These reserves of militia were established during the late Middle Ages, serving as far back as Haarlem in 1374. They consisted of archers and crossbowmen until the Spanish occupation killed three hundred servicemen in 1573. After Spanish occupation ceased in 1580, new officers were elected to lead four new militia companies of servicemen. This included St George Guild (of archers and crossbowmen) and St Hadrian Guild (of new modern riflemen), with an additional third unit in 1612.

According to Claus Grimm, from the top, the hierarchy of a guild started with a colonel, and the administrative coordinator was the closest subordinate supervising each company. Each company was led by a captain, a lieutenant, two sergeants, and an ensign, who were standard-bearers of the company's flag.

Militia men also had to pay for their service, with only well-known citizens and wealthy members serving as officers. Additionally, people could not join the civic guard if they could not afford a uniform and weaponry. The highest ranks came from the wealthy merchant class, such as Captain Michiel de Wael who was a popular tavern keep in the region.

During the Dutch Golden Age, Frans Hals had painted five schuttersstukken or group portraits of various Haarlem companies between the years 1616 to 1639. The group portrait for the Banquet of the Officers of the St George Militia Company in 1627 was commissioned by the members of the company to commemorate the end of their three years of service. The artist would be reimbursed equally by each member, though some members had the potential in paying more than what they were owed, which they used to adjust their placement on the painting. On the other end, those that were not able to pay their sum would have a diminished role in their placement on the canvas.

== Subject matter ==
=== Style ===
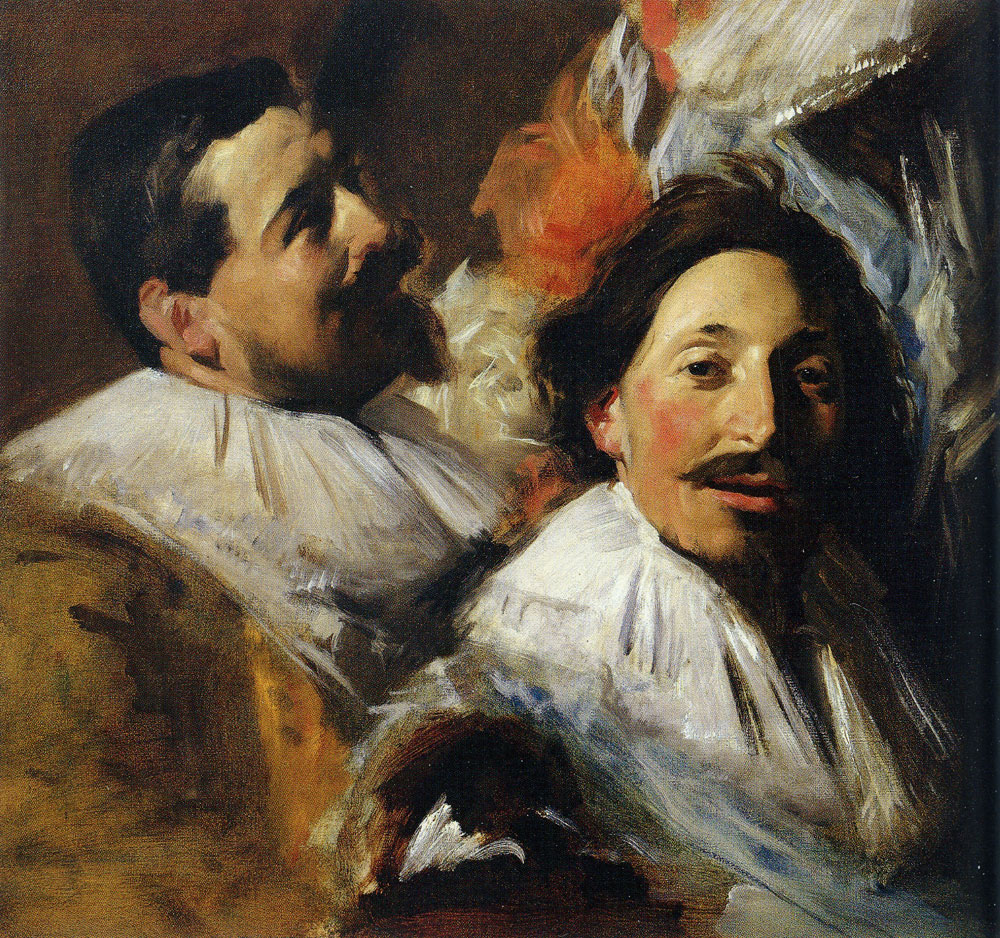
The varying height placement and positioning of the officers heads gives an illusion of the figures interacting with each other and the viewer.

Frans' portraiture depicting the St George Militia Company is heavily focused on impressionism; the loose and brisk brushstrokes are very clear up close, but allow the details to come out from afar. The painting is group portraiture but can also be seen as a genre painting, as it portrays an event where the figures are captured and frozen at a moment in time. Frans Hals's group portraiture, as described by art historian Ann Sutherland Harris, evokes what is called "seeming realism" as they tend to feel very lifelike despite the subject being fake. The reason for this is that this painting was not created in front of the civic guard during the banquet; Frans Hals made an original composition and later had each of the members model for him in his studio.

=== Composition ===
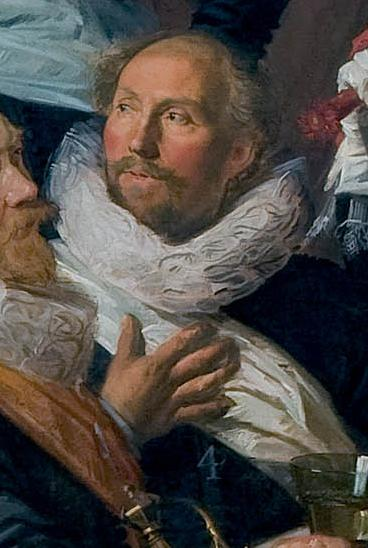
Captain Nicolaes Verbeek looks to the side as if he is having a conversation outside the paintings borders.

In Ann Sutherland Harris' book, Seventeenth-century Art and Architecture, Harris praises Hals for his compositional prowess and that his methods in painting this series of schuttersstukken allow for varied events all throughout. How the figures are arranged and how their body language is translated is very life-like. He utilizes varying heights across the canvas, giving the piece depth, while also placing the officers in the front, having them turn around as if to look forward. This choice created this extra illusion of interaction where the figures are looking at someone outside the borders of the painting. It displays this sense of realism that feels like a moment taken out of time.

Hals was more concerned on how the arrangement and body language of the officers interacted in the piece over any kind of symbolism, a bi-product of the Dutch Golden Age that came from the emphasis on group portraiture. Frans wanted to emphasize the individual silhouettes in excerpts of conversations and interacting movements, any ceremonial symbolism in the banquet was only minor.

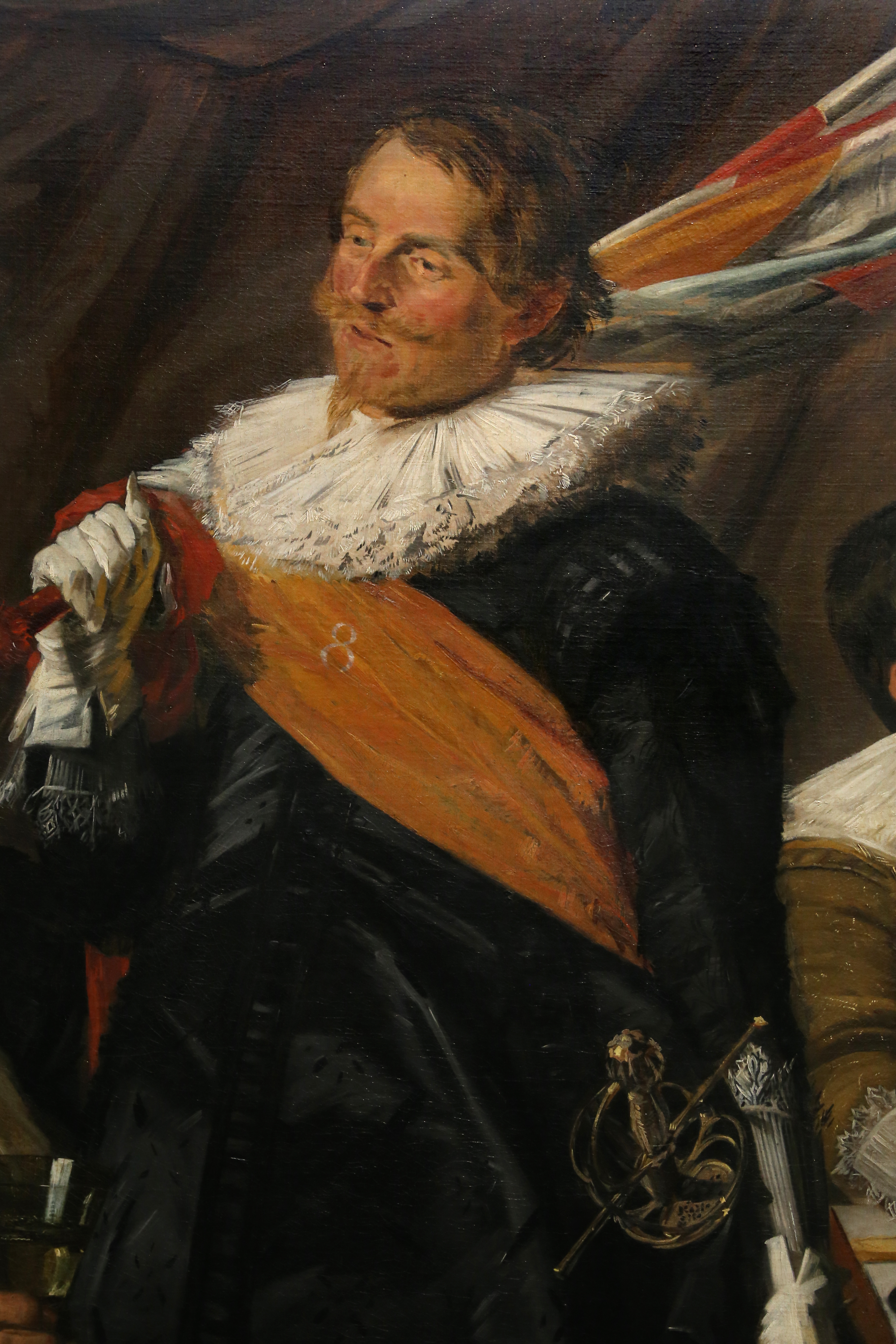
Close up of Boudewijn van Offenberg, the glow from the gloves that comes from the orange sash was not referenced from reality but for the sake of color balance.

=== Color ===
As a colorist, Frans Hals expertly applies vibrant colors deducing each of the members of the civic guard clearly. A prominent example can be found in the standard bearer, Boudewijn van Offenberg, the oranges contrast well with the deep darks of his uniform. His spontaneous but deliberate brushstrokes bring out the folds and texture of his uniform that evokes realism but still rooted in impressionism.

== Provenance ==
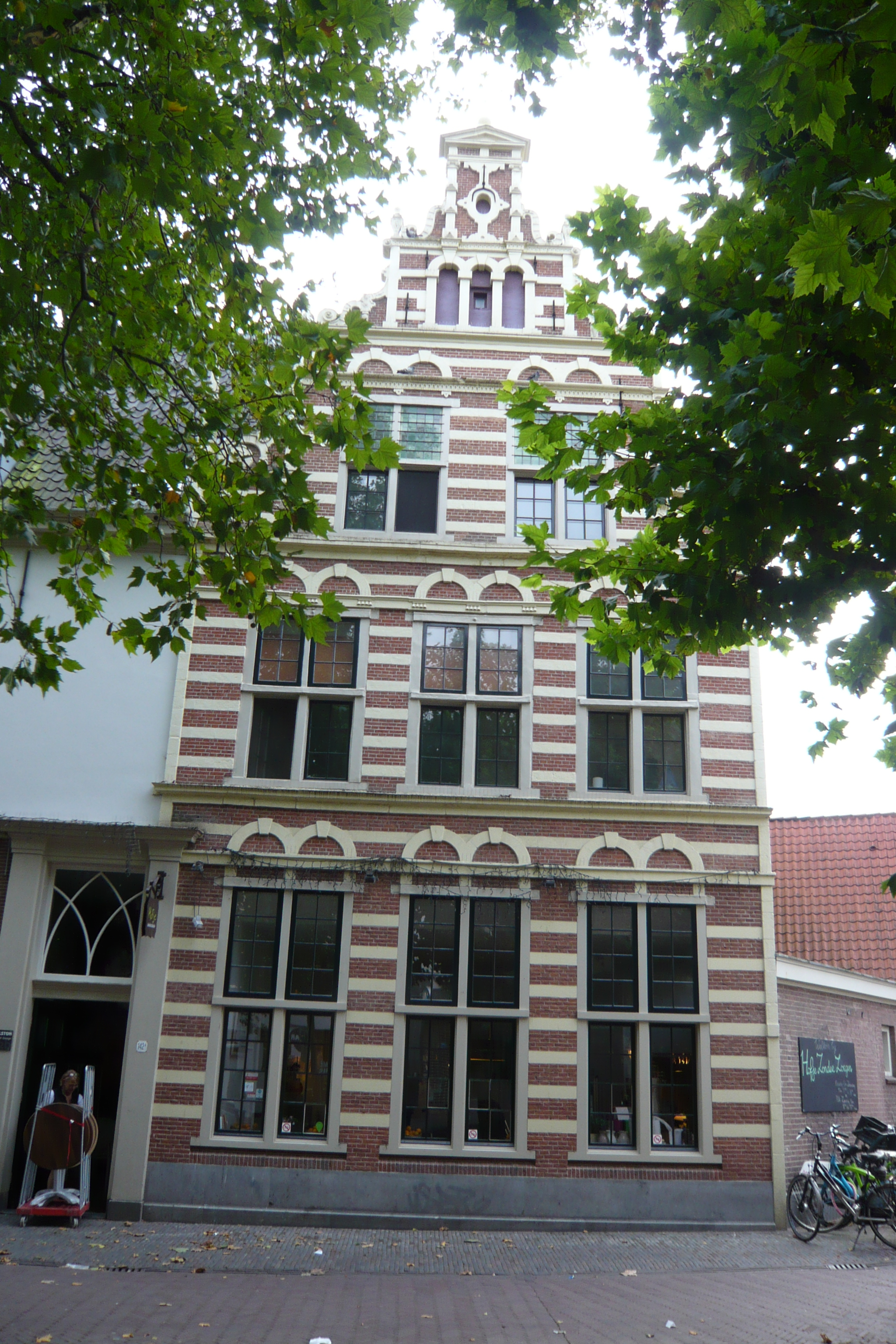
View of one of the halls of the St. Jorisdoelen

The painting previously hung with others in the old "St. Jorisdoelen" complex, known today as the Proveniershuis. The paintings by Hals and others hung in the main hall of the complex in the Grote Houtstraat. Today a hofje with the main hall used as a restaurant, the main buildings were used for years as an inn, where the schutterstukken were tourist attractions. Today all of the schutterstukken that once hung here have been transferred to the Frans Hals Museum.

== See also ==
- The Banquet of the Officers of the St George Militia Company in 1616
- The Officers of the St George Militia Company in 1639
- List of paintings by Frans Hals

== Sources ==
- Hell, M. (2014). WorldCat.org. OCLC WorldCat.org. https://www.worldcat.org/
- Harris, Ann Sutherland (2005). Seventeenth-century Art and Architecture. Laurence King Publishing. ISBN 978-1-85669-415-5.
- Tummers, A., Atkins, C. D. M., & Richards, L. (2013). Frans Hals: Eye to eye with Rembrandt, Rubens and Titian. Frans Hals Museum.
- Grimm, C., Riehle, J., & Hals, F. (1990). Frans Hals: The complete work. H.N. Abrams.
- Hals, F., & Baard, H. P. (1981). Frans Hals. H.N. Abrams.
- De Haarlemse Schuttersstukken, by Jhr. Mr. C.C. van Valkenburg, pp. 47–76, Haerlem : jaarboek 1961, ISSN 0927-0728
- Frans Hals: Exhibition on the Occasion of the Centenary of the Municipal Museum at Haarlem, 1862–1962., pp 36–38, publication Frans Hals Museum, 1962
- Banquet of the Officers of the St George Militia Company in 1627 in the RKD
