= J.F. Schouten School for User System Interaction =

Dutch research institute

J.F. Schouten School for User System Interaction is a research institute of the Eindhoven University of Technology dedicated to user interaction with man-made systems, including Human Computer Interaction.

The institute is named after the Dutch physician Prof.dr. Jan Frederik Schouten (1910-1980), who was Professor at the Eindhoven University of Technology from 1958 to 1978 to It is established by the Department of Technology Management and the Department of Industrial Design at the Technische Universiteit Eindhoven.

The institute maintains research programs and provides a Ph.D program, with a mission to develop and maintain a research program in the area of user-system interaction, and to offer an education program to PhD students who have entered the field.
