= Jan Frederik Schouten =

Dutch physicist (1910–1980)

Jan Frederik Schouten (29 May 1910 – 12 August 1980) was a Dutch physicist, and Professor at the Eindhoven University of Technology, known for his contributions to biophysics.

== Biography ==
Born in Rotterdam as son of Jan Arnoldus Schouten, Schouten received his PhD cum laude in 1937 in Physics at the Utrecht University with a thesis entitled "Visuele meting van adaptatie en van de wederzijdse beïnvloeding van netvlieselementen" under supervision of Leonard Ornstein.

After graduations Schouten as researcher started working in industry at Philips Natuurkundig Laboratorium led by Gilles Holst. Here he used optical techniques for the study of the acoustic problem. Schouten demonstrate that the way we perceive a pitch in the most sounds is different from the way Hermann von Helmholtz had proposed, and which had become generally accepted.

Schouten became manager of the telephony group, where he sought efficient methods to convey the speech signal. He discovered, along with Frank de Jager during the Second World War, that there were great opportunities in the digitalization of the voice signal opened. Independently in the United States at about the same time, Bell lab came up with a similar discovery, which preluded the digital era.

After a period as director of a telephony Philips factory, Schouten returned to scientific research. With the support of Hendrik Casimir, he founded the Instituut voor Perceptie Onderzoek (IPO) (Institute for Perception Research) at the Eindhoven University of Technology, in which Philips was a shareholder. From 1958 to 1978 he was professor at the Eindhoven University of Technology. He died in 1980 in Eindhoven.

Schouten was appointed member of the Royal Netherlands Academy of Arts and Sciences in 1961. The Eindhoven University of Technology named after him the J.F. Schouten School for User System Interaction, research institute of the dedicated to user interaction with man-made systems.

== Publications ==
- 1937. Visuele meting van adaptatie en van de wederzijdse beïnvloeding van netvlieselementen Drukkerij, Schotanus & Jens.
- 1958. De reikende hand. Inaugural speech Eindhoven. Groningen : Wolters
- 1978. Energie en vitaliteit : afscheidscollege, gegeven op 12 mei 1978 aan de Technische hogeschool Eindhoven.

About Schouten

- H. Bouma, Levensbericht J.F. Schouten, in: Jaarboek, 1980, Amsterdam, pp. 176-179
