= Michiel de Wael =

17th-century Dutch brewer painted by Frans Hals

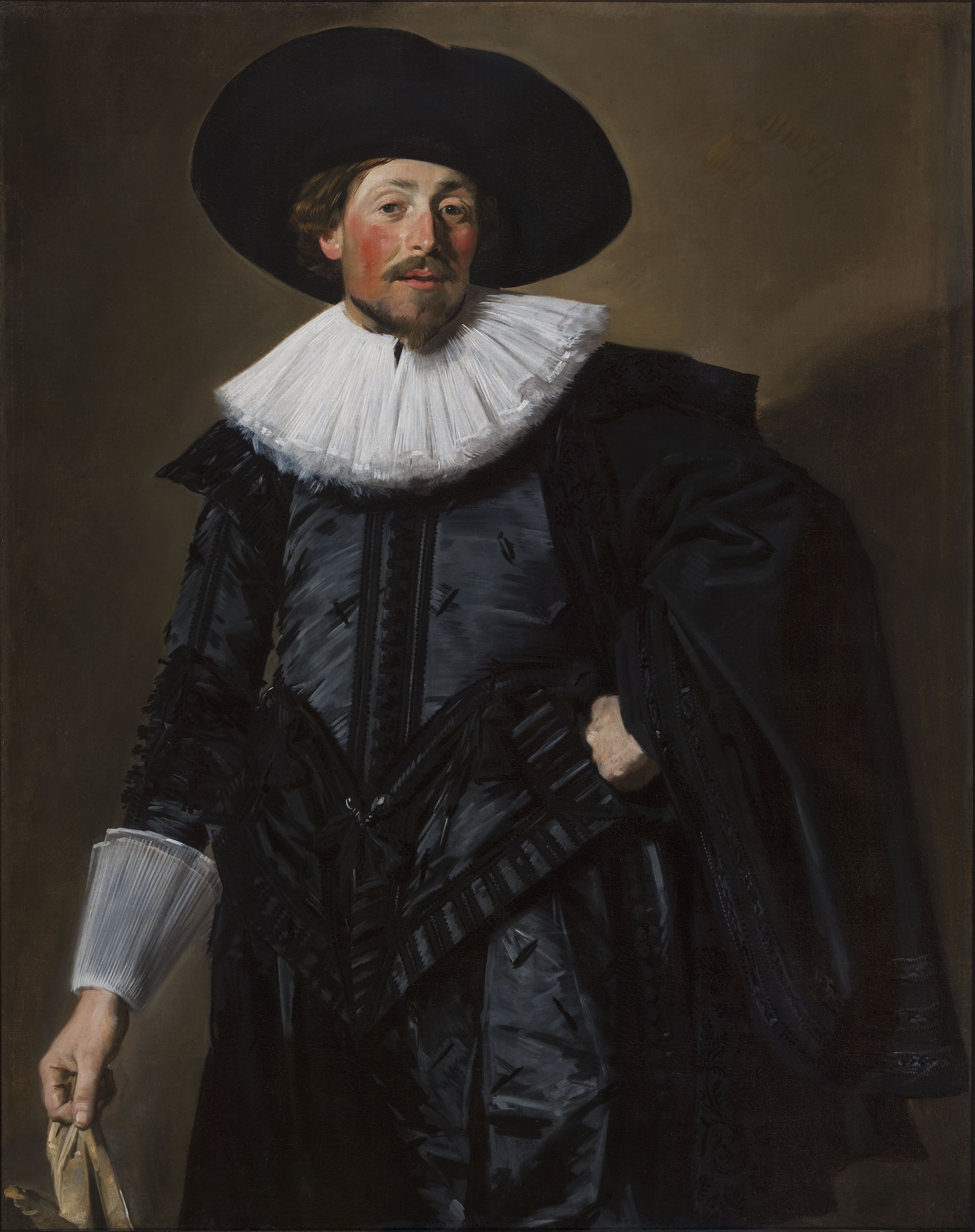
Portrait of Michiel de Wael circa 1625 by Frans Hals

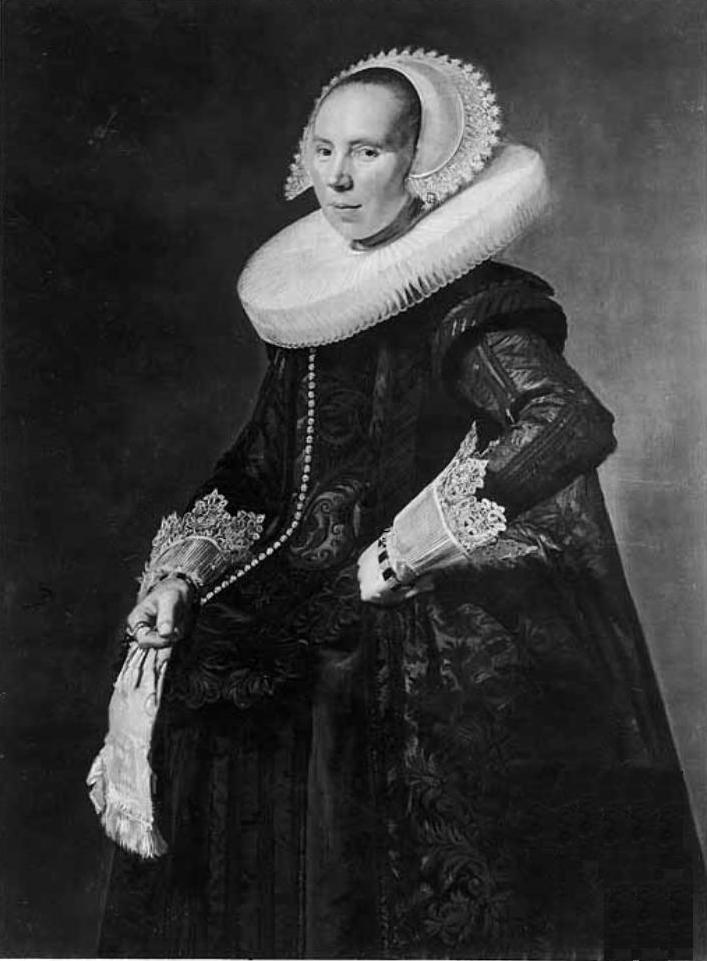
Pendant portrait of his wife, Cunera van Baersdorp

Michiel de Wael (bapt. 9 May 1596 – buried 7 April 1659 in Haarlem), was a Dutch brewer and citizen of Haarlem, best known today for his portraits painted by Frans Hals. His grandfather, also a brewer, was one of the first Calvinists in the city and was involved in the Siege of Haarlem.

== Biography ==
Michiel was the son of the wealthy Haarlem brewer and burgomaster Jan Michielsz de Wael (1557–1618) and Cornelia Anthonisdr Juyst. In 1582 his father Jan de Wael had married Cornelia Anthonisdr Juyst in Delft, aka Neeltje Thonis, from Brouwershaven. In 1588 his father moved from Amsterdam to Haarlem, where he was appointed in the vroedschap. In 1597 Jan M. de Wael was one of the burgomasters of Haarlem. After having been an arbiter he became involved as an investor in the development of the new Amsterdam city quarter, known as the Lastage. In 1605 his father remarried and Aechte Adriaensdr Van Hoorn became his stepmother.

Michiel had an elder brother Jan, a magistrate and burgomaster of Haarlem, involved in the tulip mania and in 1650 locked up in Loevestein; a brother Anthony, lawyer in Monnikendam and a sister Geertruyd, founder of Hofje van Guurtje de Waal.

Together with his elder brother, De Wael owned the breweries De Son and 't Roode Hart.

Michiel served as commissioner in the local court of justice, and served in the St. George civic militia. Hals painted De Wael twice during his career with the civic guard company in Haarlem, as captain in The Banquet of the Officers of the St George Militia Company in 1627, and as "fiscaal" in The Officers of the St George Militia Company in 1639. He was painted yet again by Pieter Claesz Soutman in the same role in 1644.

For a long time this painting was dated 1640, but the striking similarity of his face with the version from 1627 and especially his dress has recently led art historians to conclude that this painting was probably a wedding pendant. He married Cunera van Baersdorp (Leiden 1600-Haarlem 1640), who was the daughter of a mayor of Leiden, on 22 April 1625 and this portrait probably dates from that time, as does his wife's pendant. They were married exactly a half year after Cunera's mother died. That explains the bride's wedding dress in half mourning (a black skirt, white gloves and black and white bracelets but with lace).

In 1656 their 18-year-old, youngest daughter Josina married the 32-year-old Alkmaar writer Sierik Siersma in Haarlem. After Siersma died Josina moved back to Haarlem. She inherited the portraits by Frans Hals of her parents and they were handed down via her descendants until the beginning of the 1800s.

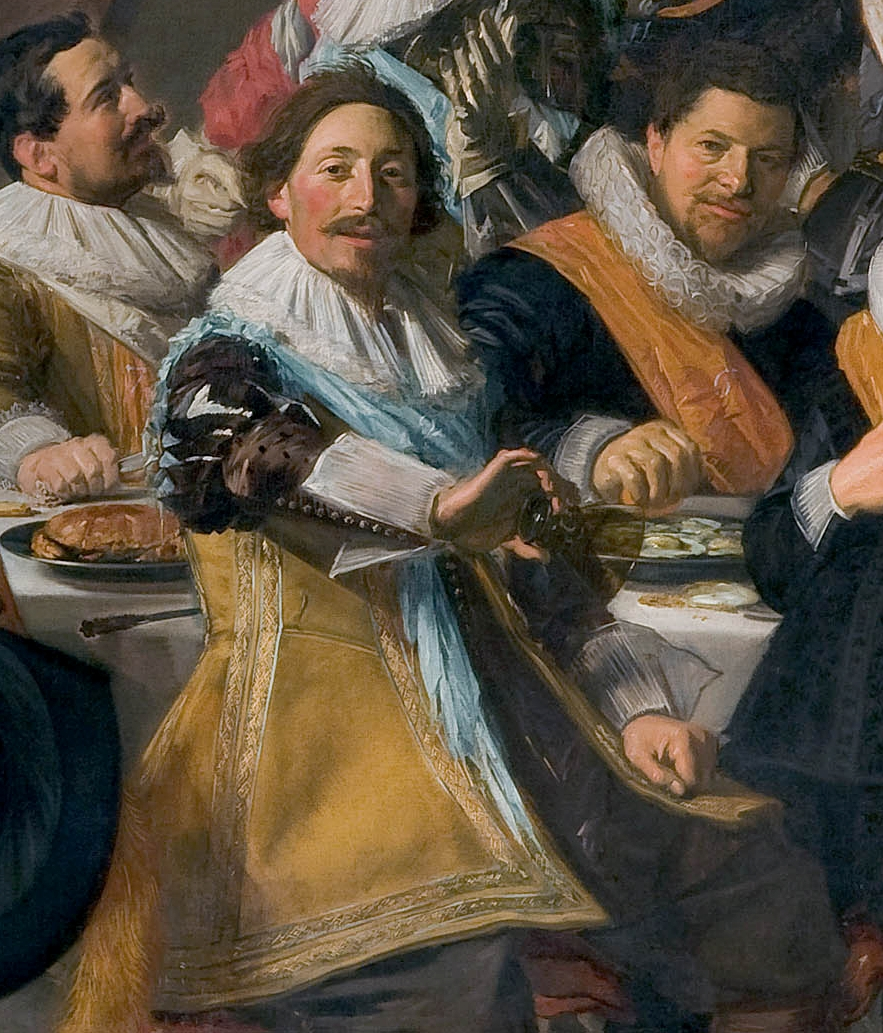
Captain Michiel de Wael about the same age, holding out his empty glass, detail of Officers of the St. George Civic Guard, Haarlem in 1627

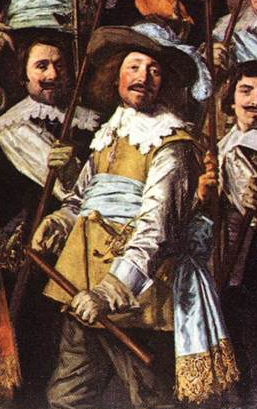
Fiscaal Michiel de Wael 12 years older, with the same leather jerkin but with a new flat collar.

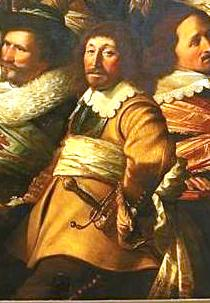
Michiel de Wael 5 years later, detail of Officers of the St. George Civic Guard, Haarlem in 1644
