= Pieter Adriaensz Verbeek =

Dutch Golden Age mayor of Haarlem

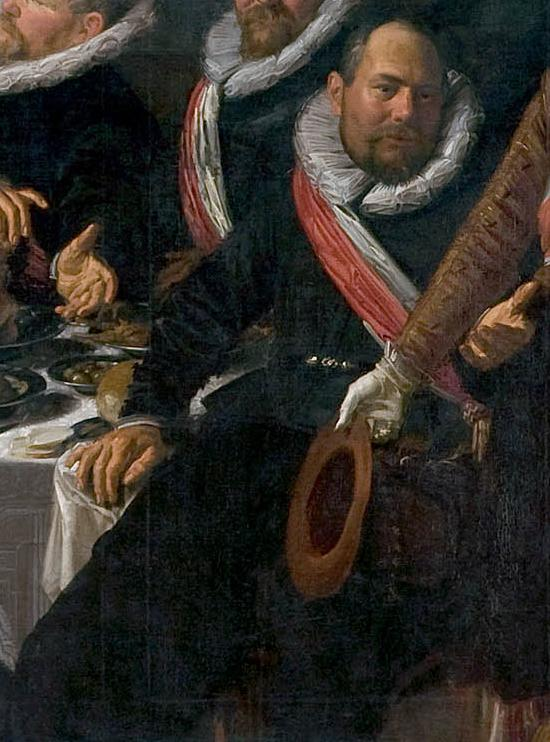
Pieter Adriaensz. Verbeek, detail of Hals's banquet of 1616

Pieter Adriaensz. Verbeek (1575–1637), was a Dutch Golden Age mayor of Haarlem.

He was the son of Adriaen Verbeek, a Haarlem toll collector, and Hendrikje van Teylingen. He married Anna van Duuren in 1599 and became a judge, magistrate, tax receiver and mayor of Haarlem. He became a member of the St. James guild (St. Jacobsgilde) and lieutenant of the St. George militia in Haarlem from 1612-1615, captain from 1618-1621, and provoost from 1621-1637. He was portrayed by Frans Hals in The Banquet of the Officers of the St George Militia Company in 1616. His younger brother was Nicolaes Verbeek.

He died in Haarlem.
