= Peter von Beeck =

Peter von Beeck (died 23 February 1624 in Aachen) was a German religious figure and a canon of the church.. He is considered the author of first Latin treatise on the History of the City of Aachen.
