= The Banquet of the Officers of the St George Militia Company in 1616 =

Painting by Frans Hals

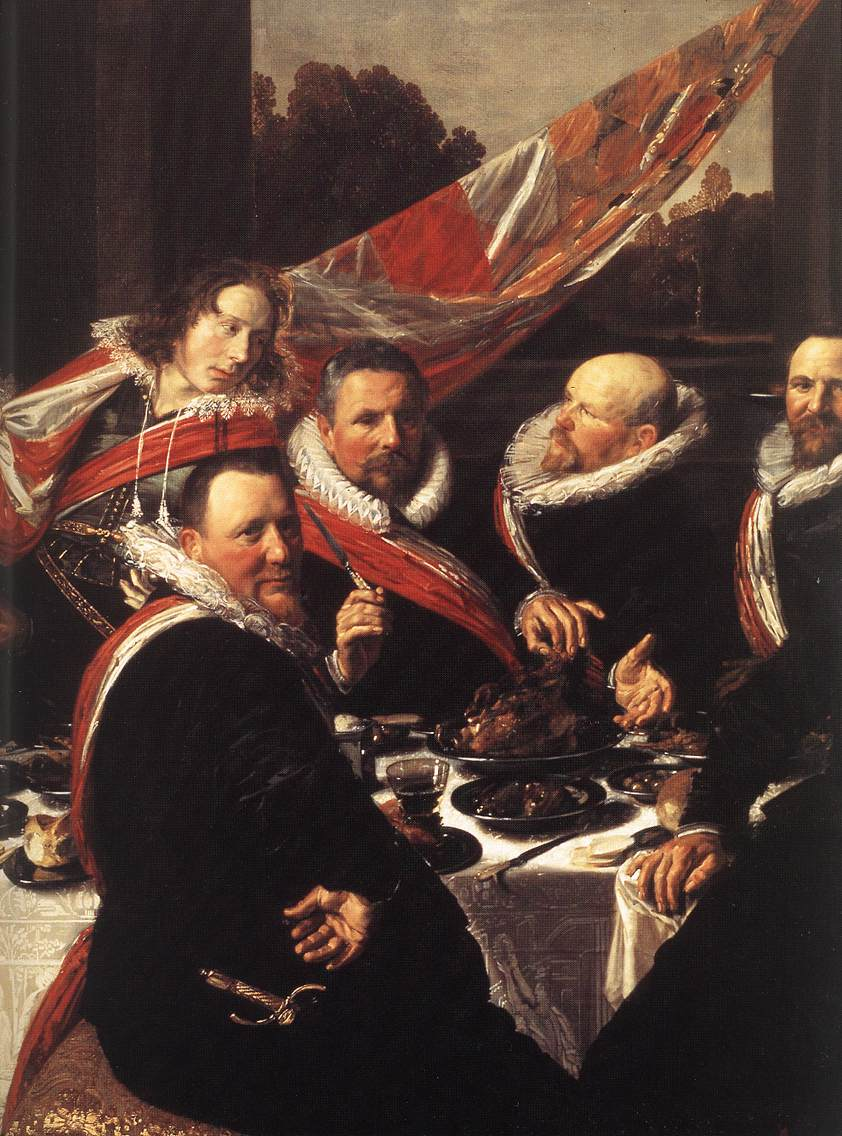
Detail of the 1616 banquet, featuring Captain Nicolaes Woutersz van der Meer whose large figure fills up the table

The Banquet of the Officers of the St George Militia Company in 1616 is the first of five large group portraits of militia companies (schutterstukken) painted by the Dutch painter Frans Hals. This portrait of the St. George (or St. Joris) civic guard of Haarlem, today is considered one of the main attractions of the Frans Hals Museum, Haarlem.

== Artistic traditions and innovations ==
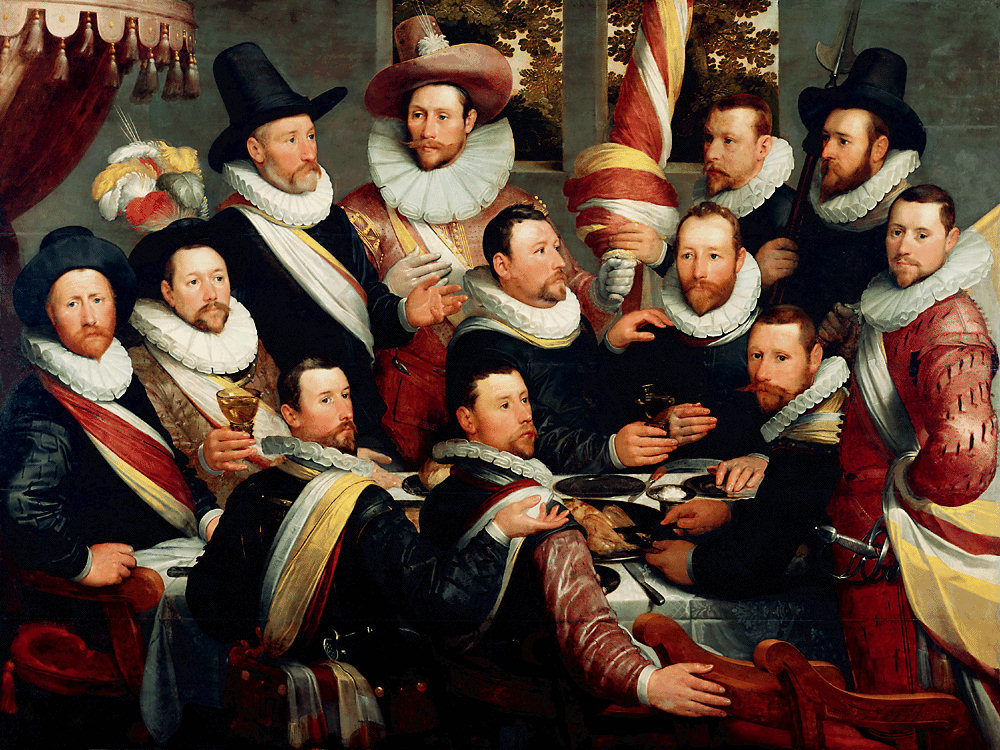
The same militia company in 1599, by Cornelis van Haarlem

Hals was in his thirties when he painted this group portrait and was not yet an established portrait painter. Hals had precedents in the work of Cornelis Cornelisz van Haarlem, who had painted group portraits of the Haarlem's militia companies in 1583 and 1599.

Hals was a member of the St. George militia from 1612–1615. In this painting, he creates a sense of the political hierarchy in the group while portraying each individual in a distinctive portrait. While Cornelis van Haarlem's figures, equally positioned within a large, square composition, appear somewhat stiff and formal, the horizontal format of Hals' painting creates a realistic space for the group to interact in different natural states of relaxed conversation.

Besides portraying the men and the group dynamics, this painting shows off the Haarlem damask tablecloth, brocade pillows on the chairs and the halberds hanging on the wall. It also displays Hals' talents as a painter: portraiture, still life and landscape.

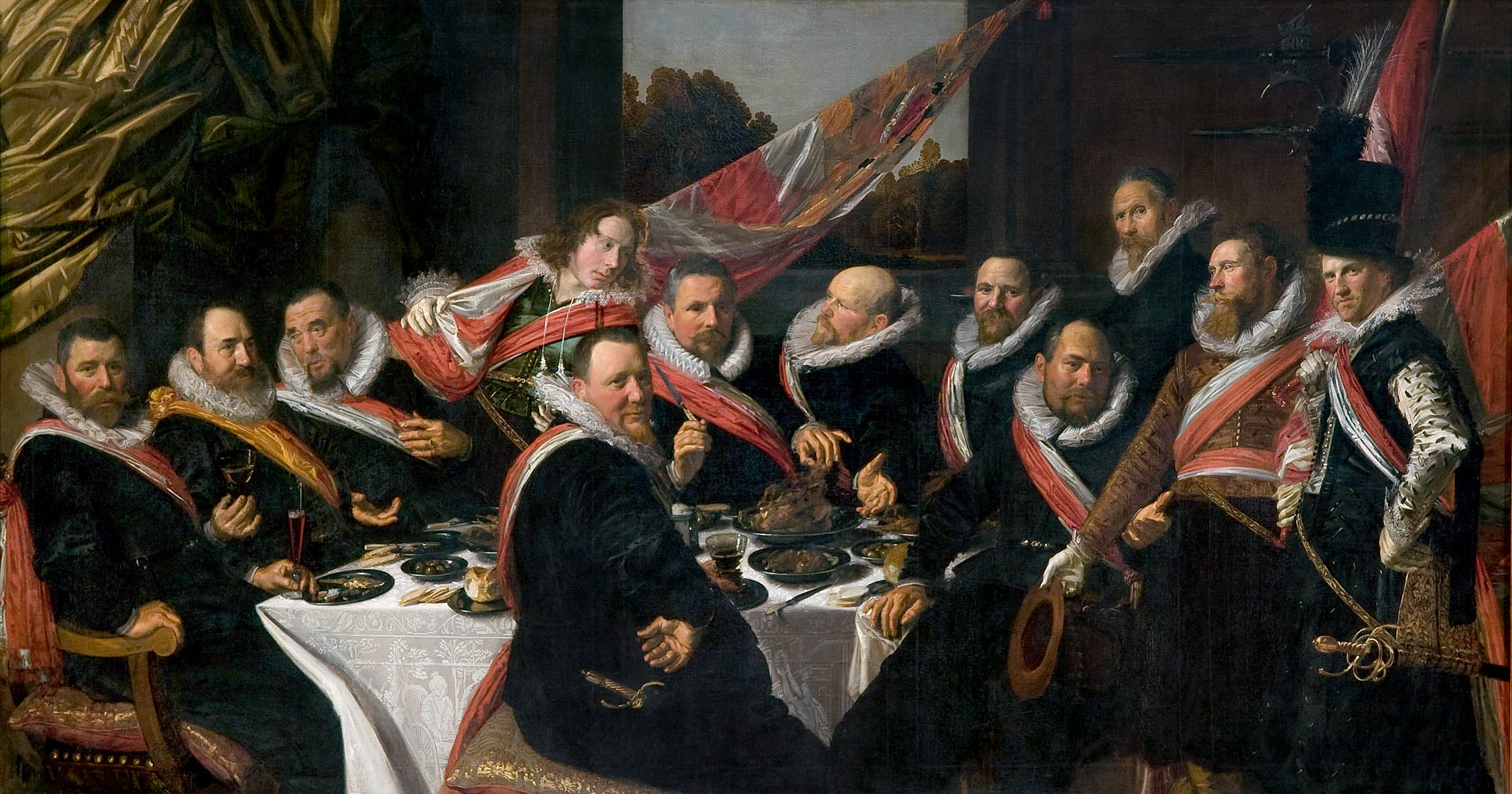
The entire painting is on one piece of seamless linen 175 × 324 cm, and a full meter wider than its predecessor by Cornelis van Haarlem, which was painted on oak panels. An impression of space and depth is given by diagonal lines leading the viewer to gaze beyond the flag out the window.

== St. Jorisdoelen ==
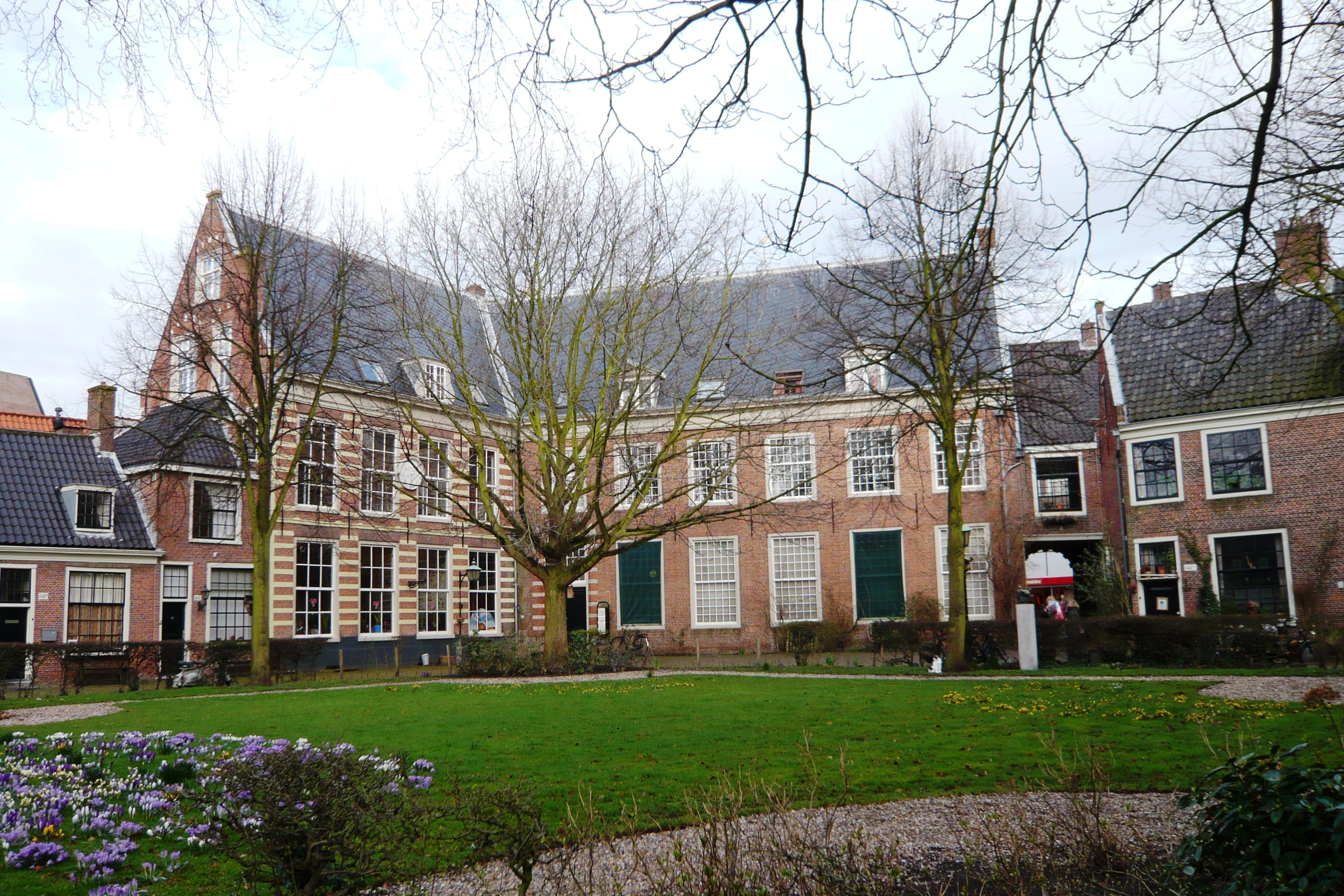
View of the main buildings of the St. Jorisdoelen; on the left is the north building from 1592, and on the right is the old gate in Lieven de Key style seen from the back

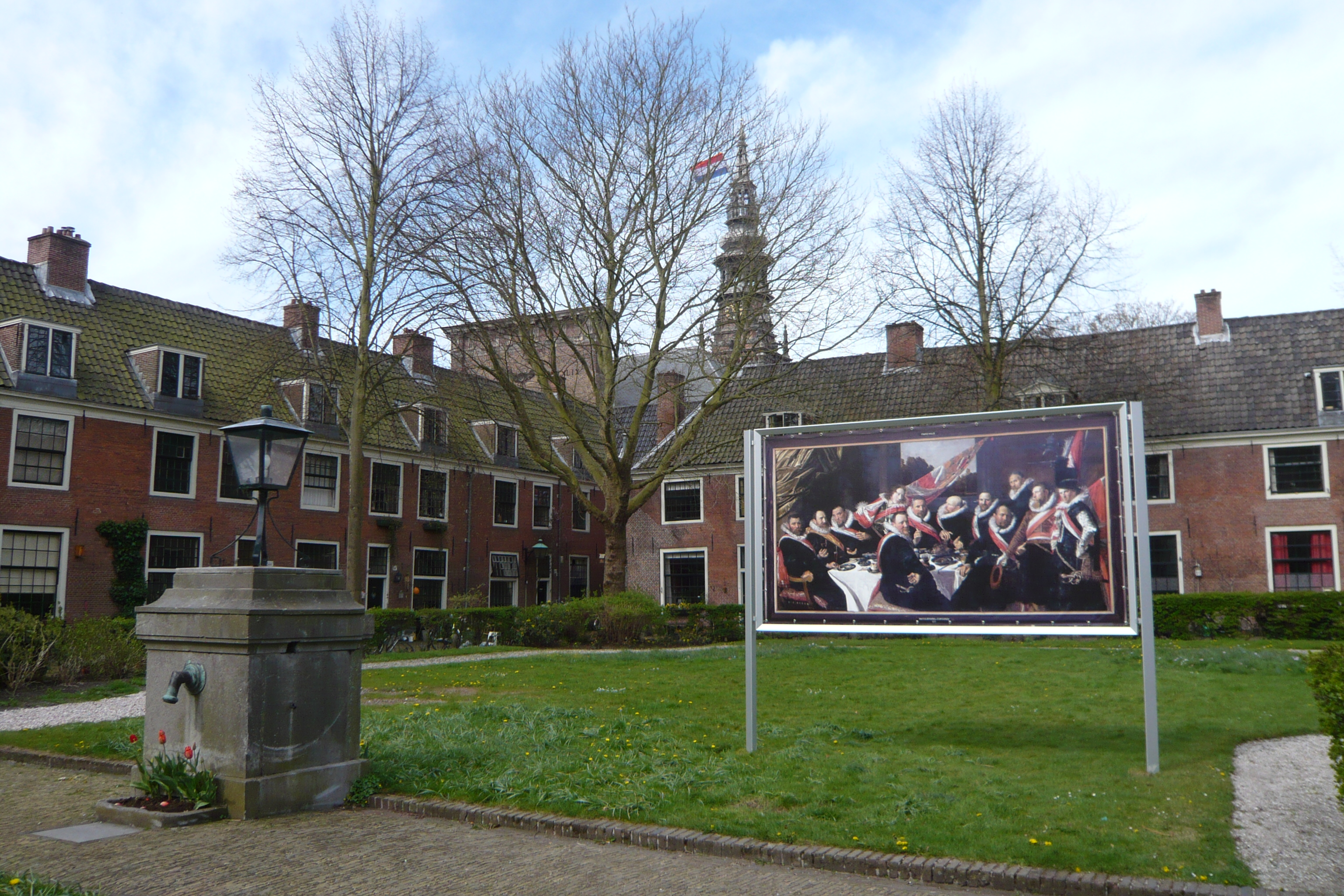
A reproduction of this schutterstuk in the garden of the old "St. Joris Doelen", today the Proveniershuis, Haarlem. The church tower in the distance is the Nieuwe Kerk, Haarlem.

The men featured are from left to right Provost Johan van Napels, Colonel Hendrick van Berckenrode (wearing the orange sash), Captain Jacob Laurensz, Ensign Jacob Cornelisz Schout (holding the flag), Captain Vechter Jansz van Teffelen, Lieutenant Cornelis Jacobsz Schout, Lieutenant Hugo Mattheusz Steyn, a servant (standing in the back), Ensign Gerrit Cornelisz Vlasman, and Ensign Boudewijn van Offenberg. In the foreground seated in front of the table are Captain Nicolaes Woutersz van der Meer, and Lieutenant Pieter Adriaensz Verbeek.

Officers were selected by the council of Haarlem to serve for three years, and this group had just finished their tenure and celebrated their end of service with a portrait. The man with the orange sash heads the table and the second in command is on his right. The three ensigns stand and the servant is carrying a plate.

The painting may have been painted on location, as Frans Hals lived in the Peuzelaarsteeg very close to the St. George militia headquarters (St. Jorisdoelen) who commissioned the painting, and managing a canvas of this size would have been a problem in Hals' studio. As an official art restorer employed by the city council, Hals had probably also already worked on paintings there. The premises had previously been the location of the women's convent called the St. Michielsklooster and after the old hall was refurbished in 1577 to house the St. Joris militia, a new hall in renaissance style was built at the north end in 1592. The paintings by Hals and Cornelis van Haarlem hung in the renaissance building at the corner of the Grote Houtstraat. Today a restaurant, the windows overlook the garden of the Proveniershuis, but in the 17th century this was an area used for target practice.

== Legacy ==
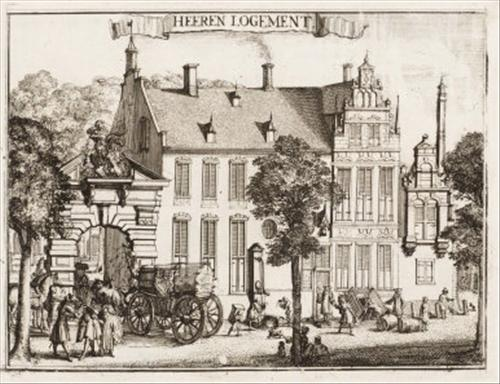
Engraving of the "Heeren Logement" in border of 1688 map by De Hooge, seen from the Grote Houtstraat.

Hals' painting was a huge success, as he won several additional portrait commissions from the subjects and their relatives, as well as winning the commission to paint a group portrait of this militia again in 1627 and in 1639. In later years the painting was seen by visitors to Haarlem, as it remained hanging in its original building after it became an inn. The inn is featured on Romeyn de Hooghe's map of Haarlem in 1688, showing the gate with a statue of St. George slaying the dragon as silent witness to the building's earlier purpose.

The Banquet of the Officers of the St George Militia Company in 1616 appears on the restaurant wall in the 1989 Peter Greenaway film The Cook, the Thief, His Wife & Her Lover.

== See also ==
- List of paintings by Frans Hals
- The Banquet of the Officers of the St George Militia Company in 1627
- The Officers of the St George Militia Company in 1639
