= Arthur Sanderson =

American electrical engineer

Arthur Clark Sanderson (October 23, 1946 – December 14, 2025) was an American electrical engineer. He was named a fellow of the Institute of Electrical and Electronics Engineers, "for contributions to the theory of sensor-based robotic systems and its application to flexible manufacturing automation".

Sanderson died from complications of Parkinson's disease in Bonita Springs, Florida, on December 14, 2025, at the age of 79.
