= Daniel Scholten =

Daniel Scholten (born 1973) is a German writer specialising in Scandinavian languages as well as ancient languages. He hosts the video-podcast series Belles Lettres on German linguistics.

== Background ==
Upon graduating from school and completing an apprenticeship, Scholten worked in Scandinavia for several years as a typographer. After this, Scholten studied at LMU Munich, with majors in Egyptology and historical linguistics, specialising in the language and literature of Ancient Egypt.

Beyond this, Scholten has also been involved with Scandinavian literature (primarily in Icelandic and Swedish) and published two literature journals.

In 2007, Scholten began writing crime novels under the title Kommissar Cederström.

Scholten founded the video-podcast series Belles Lettres in 2010 which focuses on linguistics and stylistics.

Scholte has lived since 2012 in Stockholm and Munich.

== Selection of works ==
=== As author ===
Novels

1. Der zweite Tod. Ein Fall um Kommissar Cederström. Goldmann, München 2007, ISBN 978-3-442-46402-9
2. Die falsche Tote. Ein Fall für Kommissar Cederström. Goldmann, München 2008, ISBN 978-3-442-46466-1
3. Der kopflose Engel. Ein Fall für Kommissar Cederström. Goldmann, München 2008, ISBN 978-3-442-46467-8
4. Der Name der Dunkelheit. Ein Fall für Kommissar Cederström. Goldmann, München 2009, ISBN 978-3-442-46468-5

Scientific literature

- Einführung in die isländische Grammatik. Ein Lehrbuch für Anfänger und Fortgeschrittene. Philyra-Verlag, München 2000, ISBN 3-935267-00-2
- Paradigmenfinder zur isländischen Grammatik. Alle Flexionsformen schnell bestimmt. Philyra-Verlag, München 2001, ISBN 3-935267-01-0

=== As editor ===
- Íslenska. Zeitschrift für isländische Sprache und Literatur, Jg. 1 (2004), ISSN 1614-0982.
- Ida. Schwedische Sprache und Literatur, Band 1 (2006), ISSN 1612-2976.
