= Cornelis Jacobsz Schout =

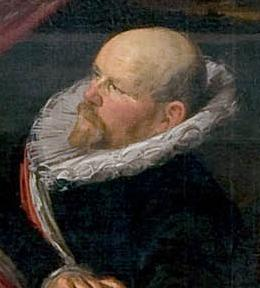
Cornelis Jacobsz Schout, detail of Hals's banquet of 1616

Cornelis Jacobsz Schout (c.1570 – after 1621), was a Dutch Golden Age member of the Haarlem schutterij.

He was the brother of the judge Jan Jacobsz Schout and the notary Pieter Jacobsz Schout and became the father of the ensign Jacob Cornelisz Schout. He was a lieutenant of the St. George militia in Haarlem from 1612 to 1615 and was captain 1618–1621. He was portrayed by Frans Hals along with his son in The Banquet of the Officers of the St George Militia Company in 1616, Frans Hals Museum, Haarlem.
