= Van der Beek =

Van der Beek, Van de Beek, Van der Beeck or Vanderbeek is a toponymic surname of Dutch origin meaning "from the brook". Notable people with the surname include:

- Cor van der Beek (1948–1998), Dutch drummer for the band Shocking Blue
- Harmsen van der Beek (1897–1953), Dutch illustrator and artist
- James Van Der Beek (1977–2026), American actor
- Jeffrey Vanderbeek (born 1957), American businessman
- Johannes Vanderbeek (born 1982), American contemporary artist
- Kelly VanderBeek (born 1983), Canadian alpine skier
- Matt Vanderbeek (born 1967), American football player
- Sara VanDerBeek (born 1976), American photography artist
- Stan Vanderbeek (1927–1984), American film director

Van de Beek

- Boy van de Beek (born 1993), Dutch footballer
- Bram van de Beek (born 1946), Dutch theologian
- Donny van de Beek (born 1997), Dutch footballer

Van der Beeck

- Johannes van der Beeck alias Johannes Torrentius (1589–1644), Dutch painter

== See also ==
- Van Beek
- Verbeek, a contraction of this surname
