= Jacob Cornelisz Schout =

Dutch schutterij member (c.1600-1627)

- Born: c. 1600
- Died: after 1627
- Era: Dutch Golden Age
- Father: Cornelis Jacobsz Schout
- Military career
- Branch: Haarlem schutterij

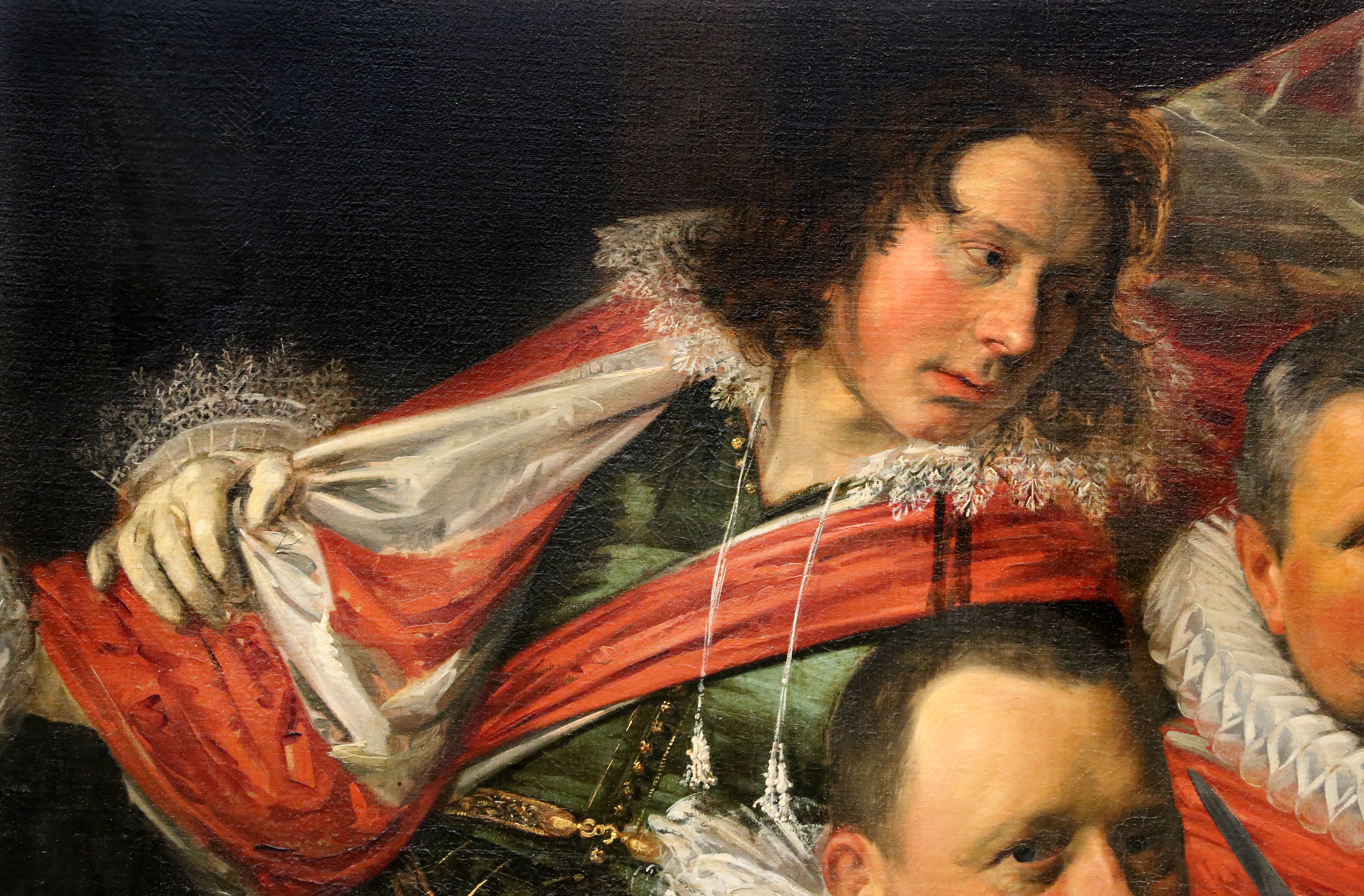
Jacob Cornelisz Schout holding his flag and looking over at his father. Detail The Banquet of the Officers of the St George Militia Company — Frans Hals (1616), Frans Hals Museum

Jacob Cornelisz. Schout (c.1600 – after 1627), was a Dutch Golden Age member of the Haarlem schutterij.

== Biography ==
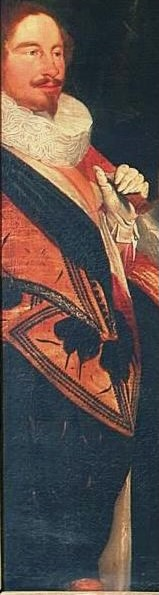
Detail The Banquet of the Officers of the St George Militia Company — Pieter de Grebber (1624)

He was born in Haarlem as the son of the judge Cornelis Jacobsz Schout, and was a flag bearer of the white brigade (and therefore bachelor) of the St. George militia in Haarlem from 1612 to 1627. He was portrayed three times in schutterstukken:

- by Frans Hals in The Banquet of the Officers of the St George Militia Company in 1616,
- by Pieter de Grebber in The Banquet of the Officers of the St George Militia Company in 1624,
- by Hals in The Banquet of the Officers of the St George Militia Company in 1627.

He died in Haarlem after 1627. He was succeeded as a flag bearer by Pieter Schout.
