= Pieter Schout =

Dutch schutterij member (c.1600s)

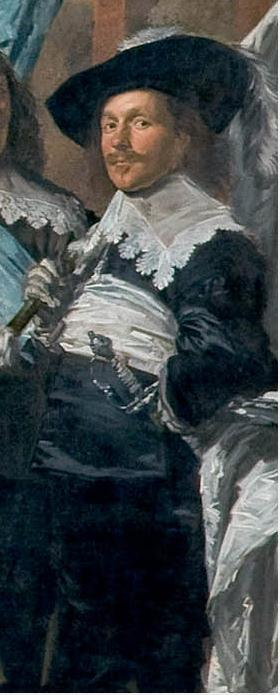

Pieter Schout (c1610 – after 1648), was a Dutch Golden Age member of the Haarlem schutterij.

== Biography ==
He was born in Haarlem and was probably a member of a Catholic branch of the Haarlem Schout family. He was a flag bearer (and therefore bachelor) of the white brigade of the St. George militia in Haarlem from 1630-1648 and was portrayed along with the rest of the officers of his militia in Frans Hals' painting The Officers of the St George Militia Company in 1639. He was preceded by Jacob Cornelisz Schout, probably a family member.
