= Pieter Jacobsz Schout =

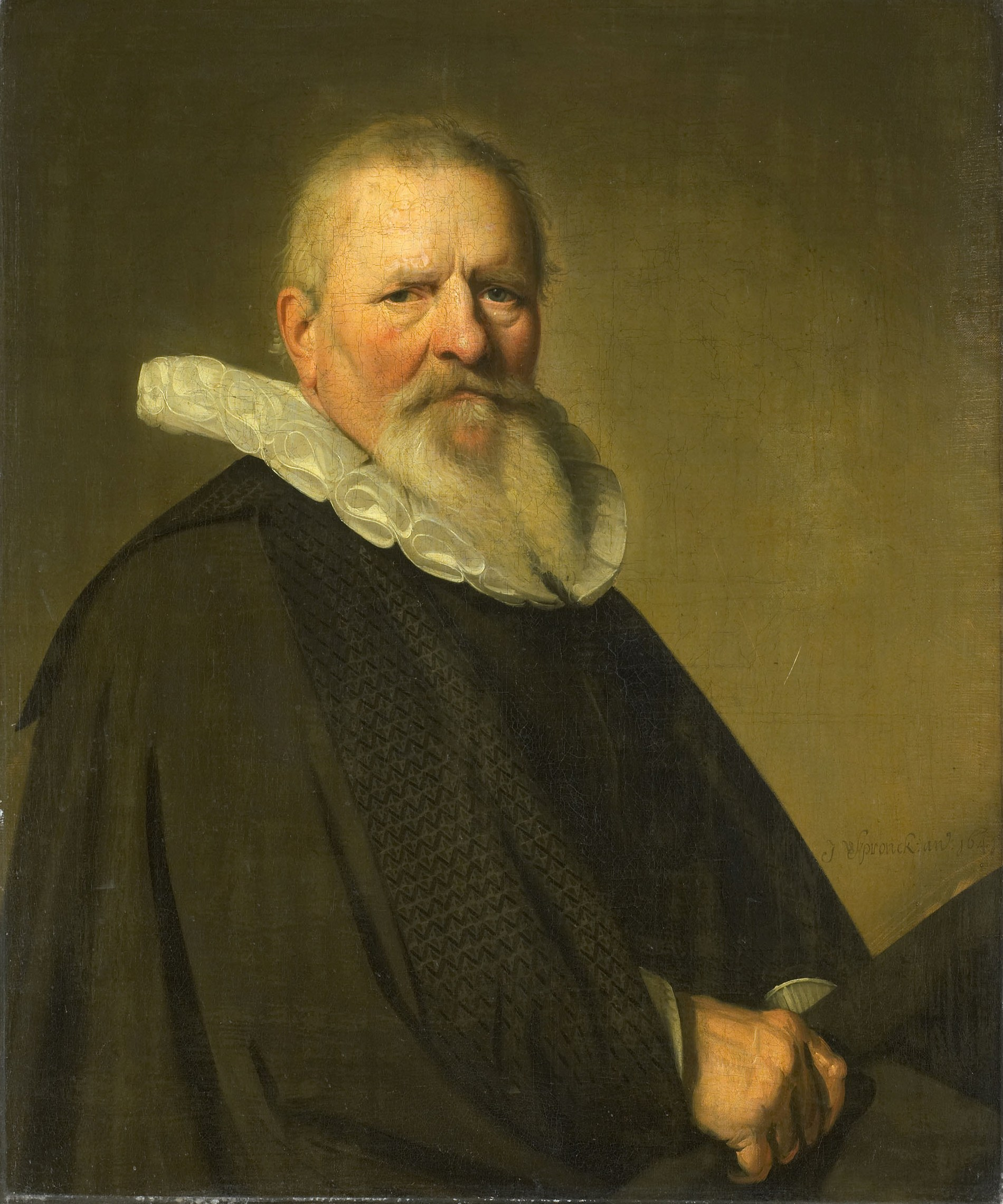
Portrait of Pieter Jacobsz Schout by Jan Cornelisz Verspronck, 1641

Pieter Jacobsz Schout (1570–1645), was a Dutch Golden Age mayor of Haarlem.

He was born in Haarlem and in 1588 he married Anna Matheusdr Steyn there, the daughter of Matheus Augustijnsz Steyn. He became capitain of the St. George militia from 1600–1603, magistrate of Haarlem (1602–1606), and was mayor in the years 1608, 1609, 1613, and 1614. From 1610–1613 and from 1617–1619 he was a member of the admiralty of Amsterdam. By 1618 he was a judge and colonel of the militia of the Haarlem schutterij, but his service as judge was not "continued" when Prince Maurits came to power in 1618. He is buried in the Grote Kerk, Haarlem. His brother Cornelis Jacobsz Schout (c.1570 – after 1621), was a lieutenant of the St. George militia in Haarlem from 1612-1615 and captain 1618-1621. Another brother was the judge Jan Jacobsz Schout.
