= Frederik Coning =

Dutch Golden Age member of the Haarlem schutterij

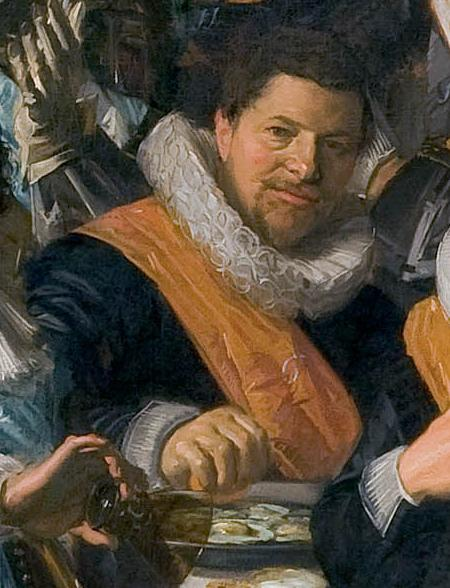
Frederik Coning, detail of Hals's banquet of 1627

Frederik Coning (7 December 1594 – 7 June 1636), was a Dutch Golden Age member of the Haarlem schutterij.

== Biography ==
He was born in Haarlem as the son of Hendrick Hendricksz and Neeltje Soeteman, and the brother of Cornelis and Hendrick. He married Jacquemijne de Wolff of Bruges, the widow of his brother-in-law Anthoni Regoot. He became a lieutenant of the St. George militia in Haarlem from 1624-1627 and captain from 1630-1633. He was portrayed by Frans Hals in The Banquet of the Officers of the St George Militia Company in 1627.

On 7 March 1635 he was buried in Haarlem.
