= The Officers of the St George Militia Company in 1639 =

Painting by Frans Hals

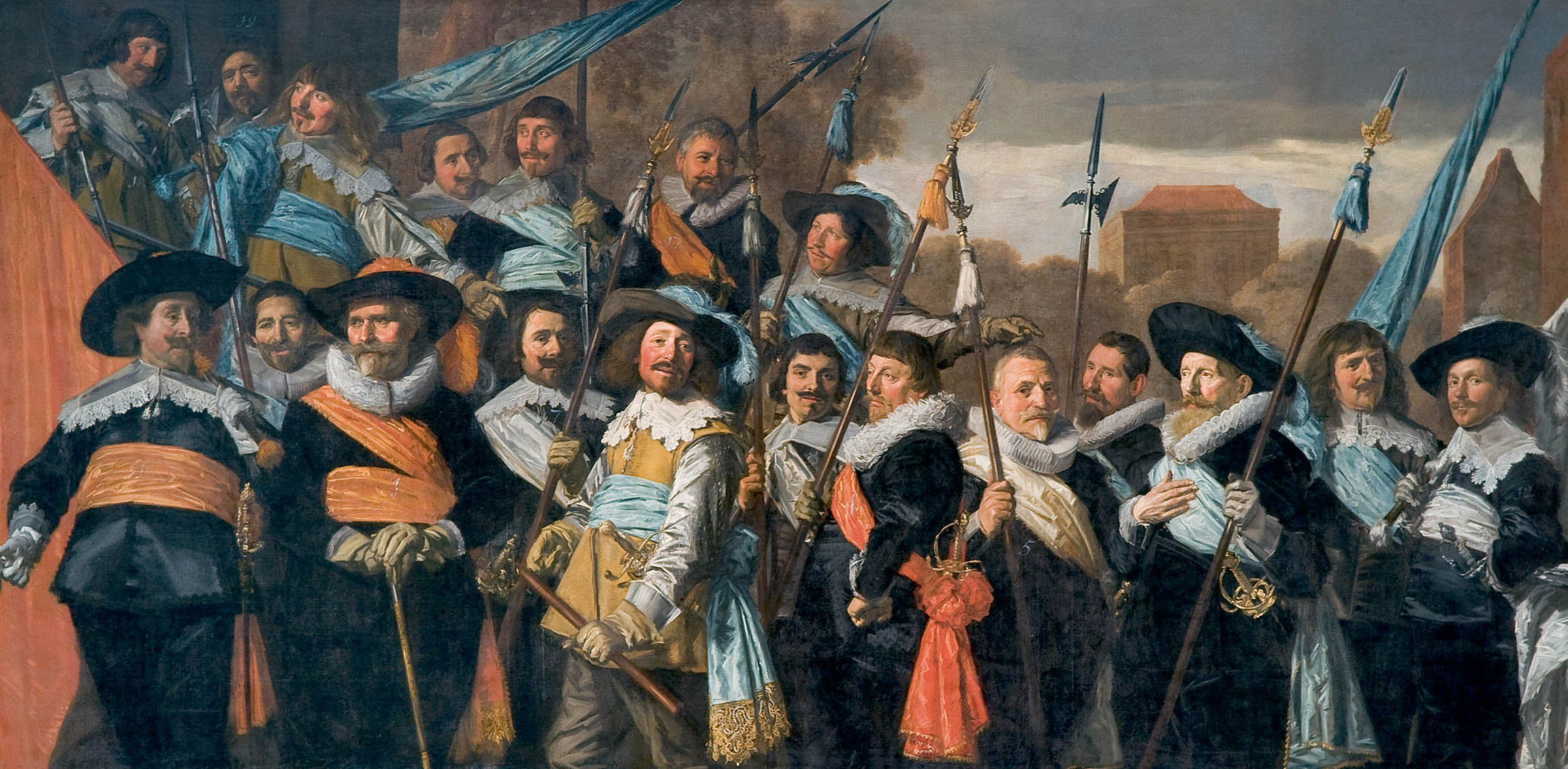
The Officers of the St George Militia Company in 1639 (1639) by Frans Hals

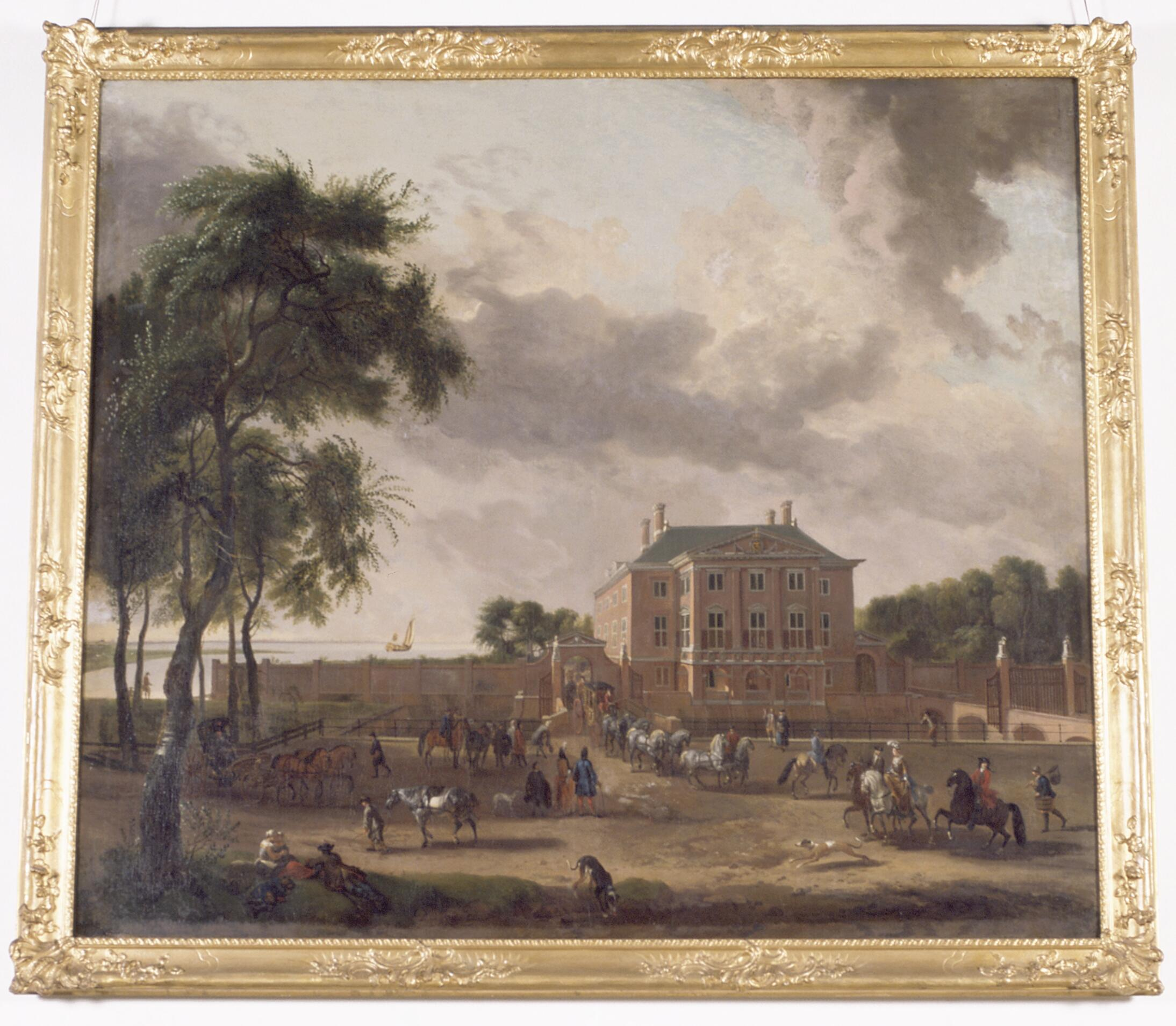
Huis Zwanenburg te Halfweg on the occasion of the visit by Amalia van Solms in 1648, painted by Dirk Maas for Pieter Schatter in 1702

The Officers of the St George Militia Company in 1639 refers to the last and largest schuttersstuk painted by Frans Hals for the St. George (or St. Joris) civic guard of Haarlem, and today is considered one of the main attractions of the Frans Hals Museum in Haarlem.

In this painting over 4 meters wide, nineteen men are portrayed, each wearing a sash in the colour of his rot, or brigade. All three brigades of the St George militia are represented, with their flag-bearers carrying flags in the colours orange, white or blue. These officers were selected by the council of Haarlem to serve for three years, and this group had just finished their tenure and celebrated their end of service with a portrait. The man with the commander's staff situated third from lower left with the orange sash and orange feather in his hat is the Colonel Johan Claesz Loo, who heads the militia. The other officers are carrying partisans with tassles (captains), spontoons (lieutenants) or halberds (sergeants).

The men featured in the foreground are from left to right Ensign Lambert Woutersz (with orange flag), Sergeant Gabriel Loreyn, Colonel Johan Claesz Loo, Lieutenant Francois Woutersz, Captain Michiel de Wael, Lieutenant Cornelis Coning, Captain Florens van der Hoeff, Captain Nicolaes Grisz Grauwert, Sergeant Lucas van Tetterode, Captain Quirijn Jansz Damast, Ensign Dirck Dicx (with blue flag), and Ensign Pieter Schout (with white flag).

The men in the background are from upper left, Sergeant Pieter de Jong, Frans Hals (self-portrait), Ensign Jacob Druyvesteyn, Lieutenant Hendrik Gerritsz Pot, Sergeant Nicolaes van Loo, Sergeant Abraham Cornelisz van der Schalcken, and Lieutenant Hendrick Coning.

Though a member of the militia, Frans Hals was never assigned the rank of an officer, though he was clearly admired as an important local artist, as was his fellow portraitist Pot, also portrayed in the rear lineup (and who features in two schutterstukken for the other militia in town - the St Adriansdoelen, or Cluveniers). Historians have speculated whether the self-portrait is indeed Hals, or another absent officer (none of the schutterstukken Hals painted were complete representations of all officers; the men paid for their portraits and some men "skipped" a painting). By the time Hals painted this painting, he had been a soldier of the guard for 25 years, and it had been 23 years since he completed his first schutterstuk for this militia, a highly unusual length of time between commissions for any artist of his time.

== Artist lineup? ==
Besides showing local painters Hals and Pot, two other men in the rear lineup were relatives of local painters; Lieutenant Cornelis Coning was an engraver, Ensign Jacob Druyvesteyn was the son of Aart Jansz Druyvesteyn, and Sergeant Abraham Cornelisz van der Schalcken was the father of Cornelis Symonsz van der Schalcke, who some say painted the original landscape in this painting, though this was partially overpainted in 1702. This was done by local artist Dirk Maas, whose overpainting may have been meant to honor the local artist-architect Pieter Post. Another artist featured in this painting in the foreground is Quirijn Jansz Damast, a respected designer of fine-woven linen, whose work also featured in the tablecloth of Hals' first work for the militia, The Banquet of the Officers of the St George Militia Company in 1616.

== St. Jorisdoelen ==
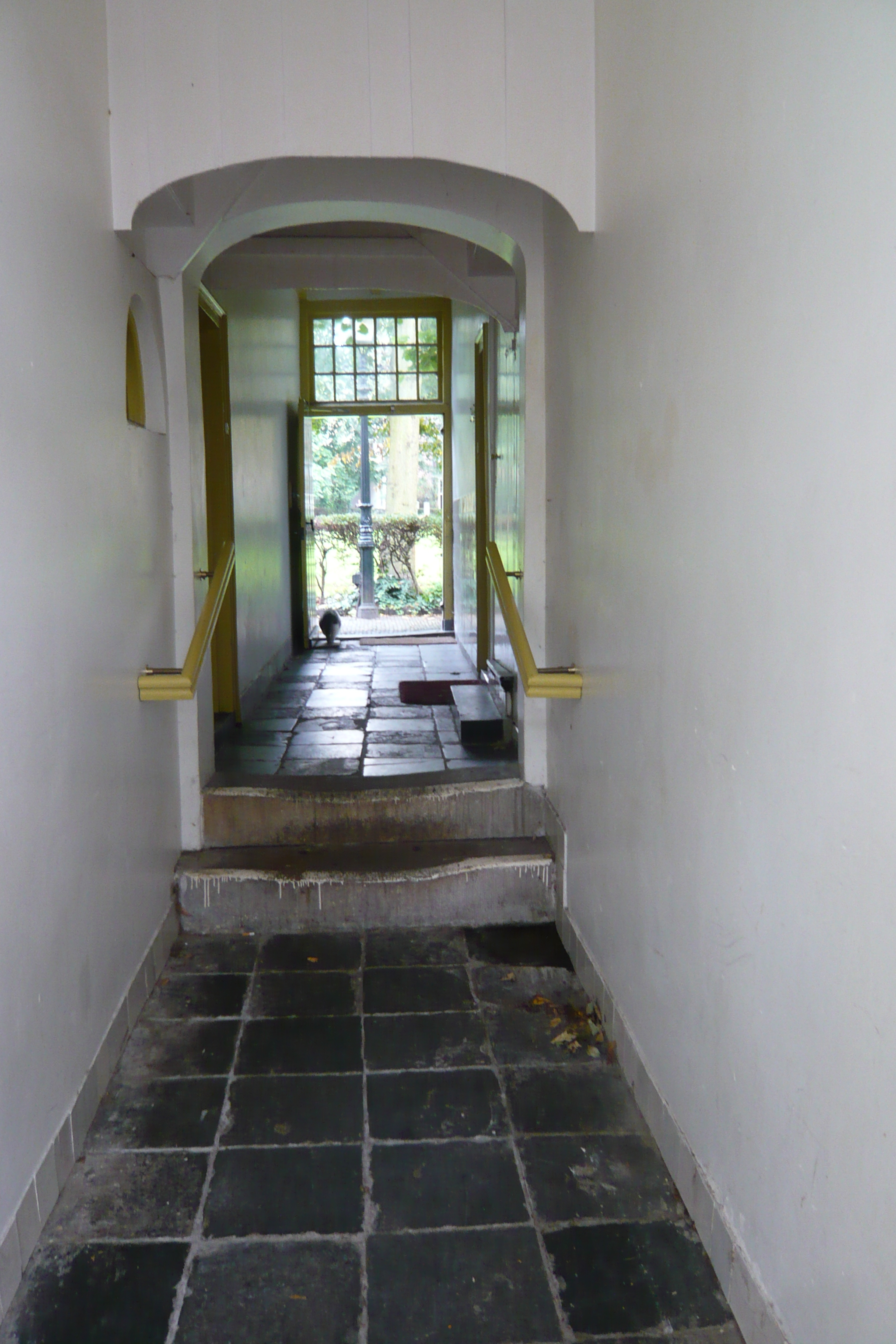
View of the rear entrance to the garden of the St. Jorisdoelen. Large paintings like this one may have pushed out others to be hung in this lowly corridor

The painting previously hung with others in the old "St. Jorisdoelen" complex, known today as the Proveniershuis. The paintings by Hals and others were once hung in the main hall of the complex in the Grote Houtstraat. The building in this painting has puzzled historians, because the St. Jorisdoelen does not look like this building. Instead, the building portrayed looks like Gemeenlandshuis Zwanenburg. In 1706, the colonel of the St. Jorisdoelen at that time was Pieter Schatter, who was also member of the board of the Hoogheemraadschap van Rijnland. According to the archives of the St. Jorisdoelen, he paid the painter Dirk Maas to "touch up" this painting, and this is the result, which looks very similar to his painting of the Huis Zwanenburg te Halfweg in 1702, which had been commissioned by Pieter Schatter for the Gemeenlandshuis van Rijnland in 1702. It is unknown why Schatter did this, though it was possibly meant to honor the Peace of Münster while paying hommage to another local artist, the architect Pieter Post. When Schatter paid for this "touch up", this painting may possibly have been moved there, though it was in the collection of the Haarlem City Hall by 1819.

Today a hofje with the main hall used as a restaurant, the main buildings of the St Jorisdoelen were used for years as an inn, where the schutterstukken were tourist attractions. Possibly the size of this painting meant that some of them had to be moved to the narrow rear entrance, which is perhaps how some of them were damaged. All the schutterstukken that once hung here have been transferred to the Frans Hals Museum.

== See also ==
- List of paintings by Frans Hals
- The Banquet of the Officers of the St George Militia Company in 1616
- The Banquet of the Officers of the St George Militia Company in 1627
