= Woutersz =

Woutersz is a surname. Notable people with the surname include:

- Dilan Woutersz (born 1977), Sri Lankan cricketer
- Francois Woutersz (1600–1661), Dutch brewer
- Gualterus Woutersz (c. 1670–1759), Dutch politician
- Lambert Woutersz (1602–1655), Dutch brewer
- Wilhelm Woutersz (1939–2003), Sri Lankan diplomat
- Jan Woutersz van Cuyck (c. 1540–1572), Dutch Renaissance painter
- Jan Woutersz Stap (1599–1663), Dutch Golden Age painter
- Nicolaes Woutersz van der Meer (1575–1666), Dutch brewer
- Arthur "Artie" Woutersz (1896-1947), Canada Soccer Hall of Fame Player
- Kristen Woutersz (Born 1985), Founder of American Rock Band Conquer Divide
- Violet Woutersz (1903-1994), Actress, Co-Founder of Montreal Children's Theatre (Stage name Violet Walters)
- Jacob Woutersz (1584 - 1641), Dutch Painter
