= Pieter de Jong =

Dutch Golden Age member of the Haarlem schutterij

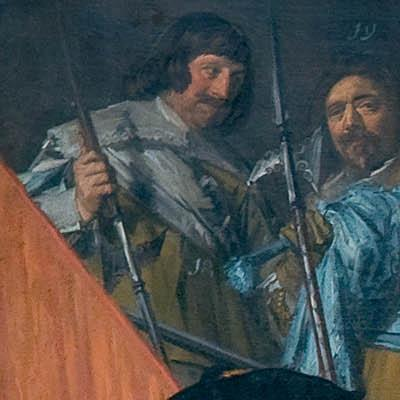
Pieter de Jong, detail of schutterstuk by Frans Hals in 1639

Pieter de Jong (c.1610 – after 1639), was a Dutch Golden Age member of the Haarlem schutterij.

He is only known from his portrait painted by Frans Hals in his schutterstuk called The Officers of the St George Militia Company in 1639. The portrait is possibly not of him but of someone called Mr. Johan van Wallenburg or "van Brienen". He is portrayed standing next to Hals himself as a sergeant of the white brigade, because he is wearing a white sash and holding a sergeant's halberd.

De Jong is possibly the individual mentioned as the brother of the "former mayor Houff" in the archive document relating to the testament of Florens van der Houff, who is also portrayed in the same painting.
