= Lucas van Tetterode =

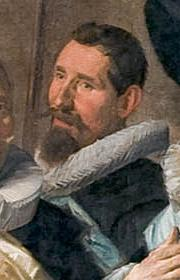
Lucas van Tetterode, detail of schutterstuk by Frans Hals in 1639

Lucas van Tetrode, or Tetterode (c.1592 – 1647), was a Dutch Golden Age member of the Haarlem schutterij.

== Biography ==
He is only known from his portrait painted by Frans Hals in his schutterstuk called The Officers of the St George Militia Company in 1639. The portrait is possibly not of him but of someone called "Francijn".

He is portrayed as a sergeant of the blue brigade, because he is wearing a blue sash and holding a sergeant's halberd.
