= Gabriel Loreyn =

Dutch Golden Age member of the Haarlem schutterij

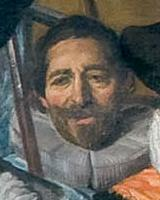
Gabriel Loreyn, detail of schutterstuk by Frans Hals in 1639

Gabriel Loreyn (1591 – 1660), was a Dutch Golden Age member of the Haarlem schutterij and successful silk cloth merchant.

== Biography ==
He was born in Haarlem as the son of Fermijn and Josina Verkruyssen. He became first sergeant of the St. George militia 1636-1639, then lieutenant 1642-1645, and was portrayed along with the rest of the officers of his militia in Frans Hals' painting The Officers of the St George Militia Company in 1639. He married Geertruyt van Clarenbeek (1589-1660) on February 3, 1619. Together, they had a daughter.

He died in Haarlem in 1660 at age 69.
