= Cornelis Coning =

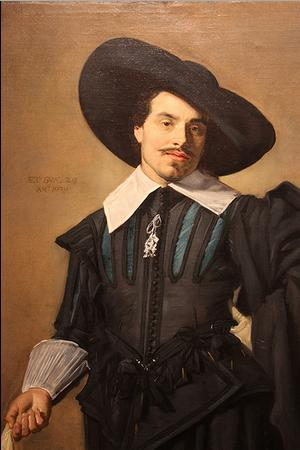
Portrait of Cornelis Coning by Frans Hals, 1630

Cornelis Coning or Koning (1601 – 3 April 1671), was an engraver and mayor of Haarlem.

== Biography ==
He was born in Haarlem as the son of Hendrick Hendricksz and Neeltje Soeteman who married Catharina Regoot in 1632. He was also known as Coningh or Koninck and engraved oval portrait prints of religious figures. These were mostly in collaboration with Samuel Ampzing, who wrote many poems to accompany them. He is best known today for his portrait painted by Frans Hals in the collection of the Allentown Art Museum. He was also painted by Hals again as the lieutenant standing in the schutterstuk The Officers of the St George Militia Company in 1639 between the captains Michiel de Wael and Florens Pietersz van der Hoef. Coning is wearing a white sash indicating his position as head of the White vendel of the St. Adrian's schutterij 1636–1639, but since he later served in the St. Joris schutterij as captain from 1642 to 1651 he probably asked to be included in their commemorative group portrait. His brother Hendrick is also portrayed in the same painting. He had served the previous period in the St. George militia, but would become lieutenant in the St. Adrian militia for the next period of service.

He died in Haarlem 3 April 1671, and later the same year his wife died on 7 September 1671.

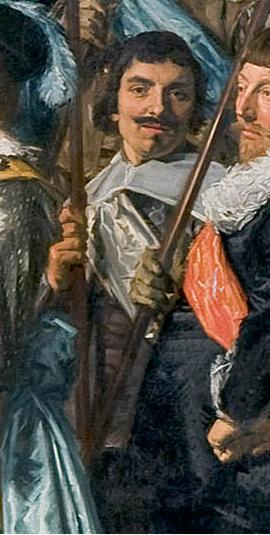
Coning in detail of 1639 schutterstuk

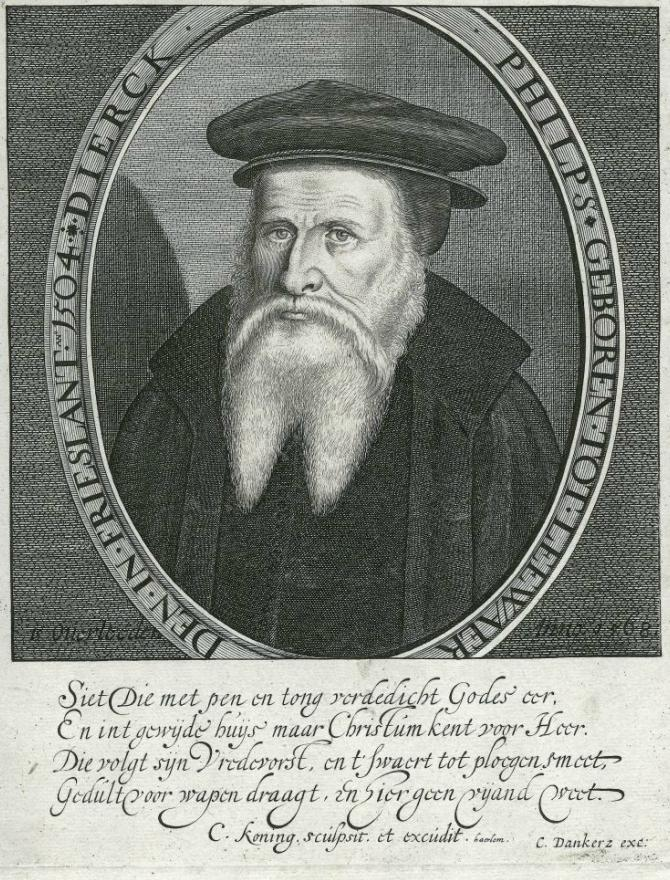
Portrait of Dirk Philips by Coning
