= Nicolaes Grisz Grauwert =

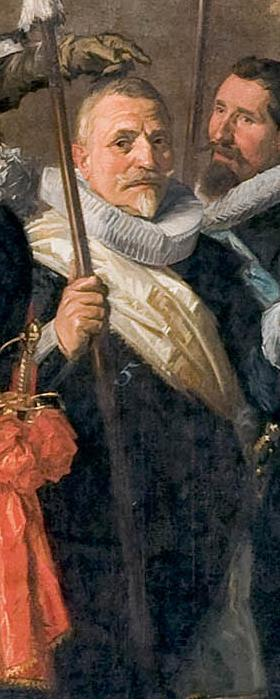
Nicolaes Grisz Grauwert, detail of schutterstuk by Frans Hals in 1639

Nicolaes Grisz Grauwert (1582 – 1658), was a Dutch Golden Age member of the Haarlem schutterij.

== Biography ==
He was born in Haarlem as the son of Ariss Akersloot and Risje Laurensdr Grauwert, but he took on his mother's name. He was the brother of the silversmith and engraver Outgert Ariss Akersloot. He married Ludwijntgen Ham on 20 January 1613. He was a magistrate of Haarlem who became a lieutenant in the local St. George militia and was portrayed along with the rest of the officers of his militia in Frans Hals' painting The Officers of the St George Militia Company in 1639.

He died in Haarlem.
