= Quirijn Jansz Damast =

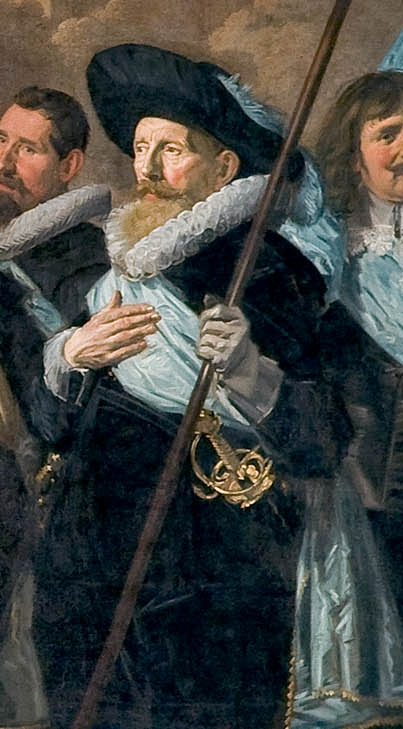
- Quirijn Jansz Damast in 1639

Personal details
- Born: 1580 Courtrai
- Died: 1638 (aged 57–58)
- Spouse: Willimijnken Jansdr van der Eynde in 1603
- Occupation: Damask Weaver

Quirijn Jansz Damast (1580 – 1638), was a Dutch linen weaver and mayor of Haarlem, best known today for his portrait painted by Frans Hals.

== Biography ==
Quirijn Damast was the son of Jan Damast Crijnsz from Courtrai. Following his father's footsteps, he became a damask weaver; his father had relocated to Haarlem around the time of Quirjin's birth in 1580. In 1603, Quirjin married Willimijnken Jansdr van der Eynde. He became a Haarlem councilman in 1627 and was mayor in 1642 and 1674. He was governor of the St. Elisabeth Gasthuis, Haarlem in 1626. In 1633 he became governor of the old men's almshouse and in 1644 he became warden of the orphans. Hals painted him 3rd from right in The Officers of the St George Militia Company in 1639. His daughter's children inherited his estate and the list of linen items in the inventory was quite impressive and was published in 1910.
