= Abraham Cornelisz van der Schalcken =

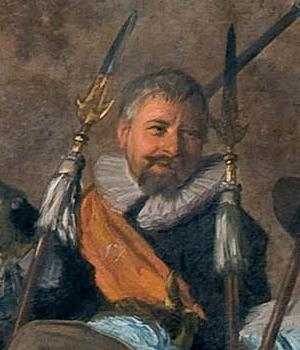
Abraham Cornelisz van der Schalcken, detail of schutterstuk by Frans Hals in 1639

Abraham Cornelisz van der Schalcken (1582 – 1642), was a Dutch Golden Age sergeant of the local militia and coster of the Grote Kerk, Haarlem.

== Biography ==
He was born in Haarlem as the son of Cornelis Symonsz from Helmond and Albertje Jansdr on 28 August 1582. He married Grietje Geraerts Gestel in October 1606 in the Grote Kerk where he was coster. His portrait was painted by Frans Hals in The Officers of the St George Militia Company in 1639 and he was the father of the landscape painter Cornelis Symonsz van der Schalcke. He died in Haarlem.
