= Cornelis Symonsz van der Schalcke =

Dutch painter

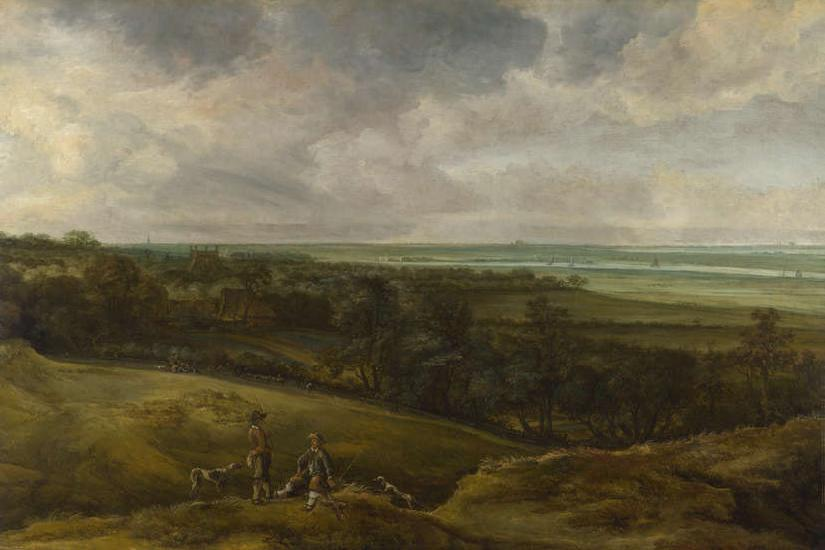
River landscape with figures, National Gallery, London

Cornelis Symonsz van der Schalcke, or Schalcken (1617– 1671), was a Dutch Golden Age landscape painter.

== Biography ==
He was born in Haarlem as the son of Abraham Cornelisz van der Schalcken who was a sergeant in the Haarlem schutterij and Sara Nuyts. Like his father before him, Cornelis became sacristan of the Grote Kerk, Haarlem in 1636. He was married there on 13 March 1640 to Janneke Beuns. They had 7 children (2 daughters and 5 sons), but none of them became artists. His earliest known work is dated 1644. He was a follower of Pieter de Molijn and Jan van Goyen and died in Haarlem.
