= Hendrick Coning =

Dutch Golden Age member of the Haarlem schutterij

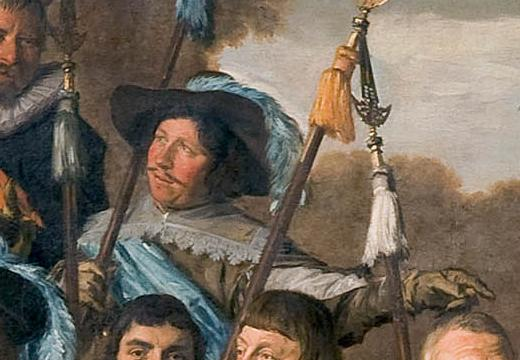
Hendrick Coning, detail of schutterstuk by Frans Hals in 1639

Hendrick Coning (1604 – after 1660), was a Dutch Golden Age member of the Haarlem schutterij.

== Biography ==
He was born in Haarlem as the son of Hendrick Hendricksz and Neeltje Jacobsdr Soeteman, who married Hester de Klerck on 18 July 1632. He became a sergeant in the St. George militia from 1636 to 1639 and was portrayed along with the rest of the officers of his militia in Frans Hals' painting The Officers of the St George Militia Company in 1639. His brother Cornelis is standing below him. Later he became a lieutenant in the St. Adrian militia from 1639 to 1642, but he was again lieutenant for the St. George militia during the years 1645–1648, 1651–1654, and 1657–1660. In the portrait, he is pointing at the weapon he should be holding (that of a lieutenant, because he was already serving as lieutenant) and the place he should be standing, namely the front row, like his brother.

He died in Haarlem.
