= Jacob Druyvesteyn =

Dutch lawyer and politician

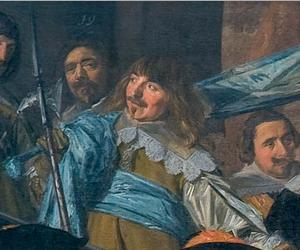
Portrait of Jacob Druyvesteyn standing between Frans Hals and Hendrik Pot, detail of schutterstuk from 1639

Jacob Druyvesteyn (1612 – 1691) was a Dutch lawyer and mayor of Haarlem.

== Biography ==
He was born in Haarlem as the son of Aart Jansz Druyvesteyn and became a lawyer. He was appointed magistrate in the city council from 1637 and in 1639 he was portrayed as a flag bearer in Frans Hals' schutterstuk The Officers of the St George Militia Company in 1639. Traditionally flag bearers were bachelors, but he was not a bachelor for long, because he married Wilhelmina Coymans, the wealthy daughter of Joseph Coymans in the same year. In 1647 he became mayor like his father before him. Among other offices, he served as head bailiff of Kennemerland and board member of the Dutch East India Company and in 1657 he was colonel of the schutterij.

He had nine children; his son Aarnoudt also became mayor. He died in Haarlem.
