= Florens van der Houff =

Mayor of Haarlem

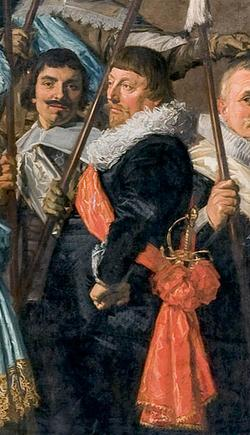
Portrait of Florens Pieter van der Houff, standing in front of Cornelis Coning and looking towards his father-in-law, detail of schutterstuk from 1639

Florens Pietersz van der Houff (c.1600 – 12 November 1657), was a magistrate and mayor of Haarlem who became a member of the Admiralty of Amsterdam during the years 1655 - 1657.

== Biography ==
He was born in Delft as the son of the mayor Pieter van der Houff and his wife Bartha van Adrichem. He married Risje, the daughter of Johan Claesz Loo on 10 June 1624. He is portrayed as lieutenant in the militia group portrait (schutterstuk) by Pot The Officers of the St Adrian Militia Company in 1630 and again as captain in The Officers of the St George Militia Company in 1639 by Frans Hals, where he is standing between Lt. Cornelis Coning and Captain Nicolaes Grisz Grauwert looking over at his father-in-law. He later became mayor of Haarlem and governor of Het Dolhuys as well as the Oude Mannenhuis. He also served as church warden in Haarlem and as a member of the admiralty of Amsterdam in 1655-1657.

He died in Haarlem and his estate included several paintings by leading Haarlem painters, of which there were portraits of himself, his wife, his father-in-law, and Jacobus Buttinga.
