= Francois Woutersz =

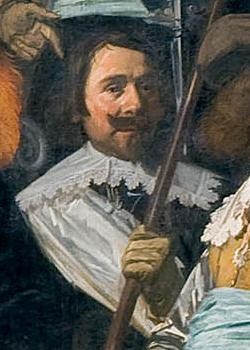
François Wouters, detail of schutterstuk by Frans Hals in 1639

François Wouters (1600 – 1661), was a Dutch Golden Age brewer and mayor of Haarlem.

== Biography ==
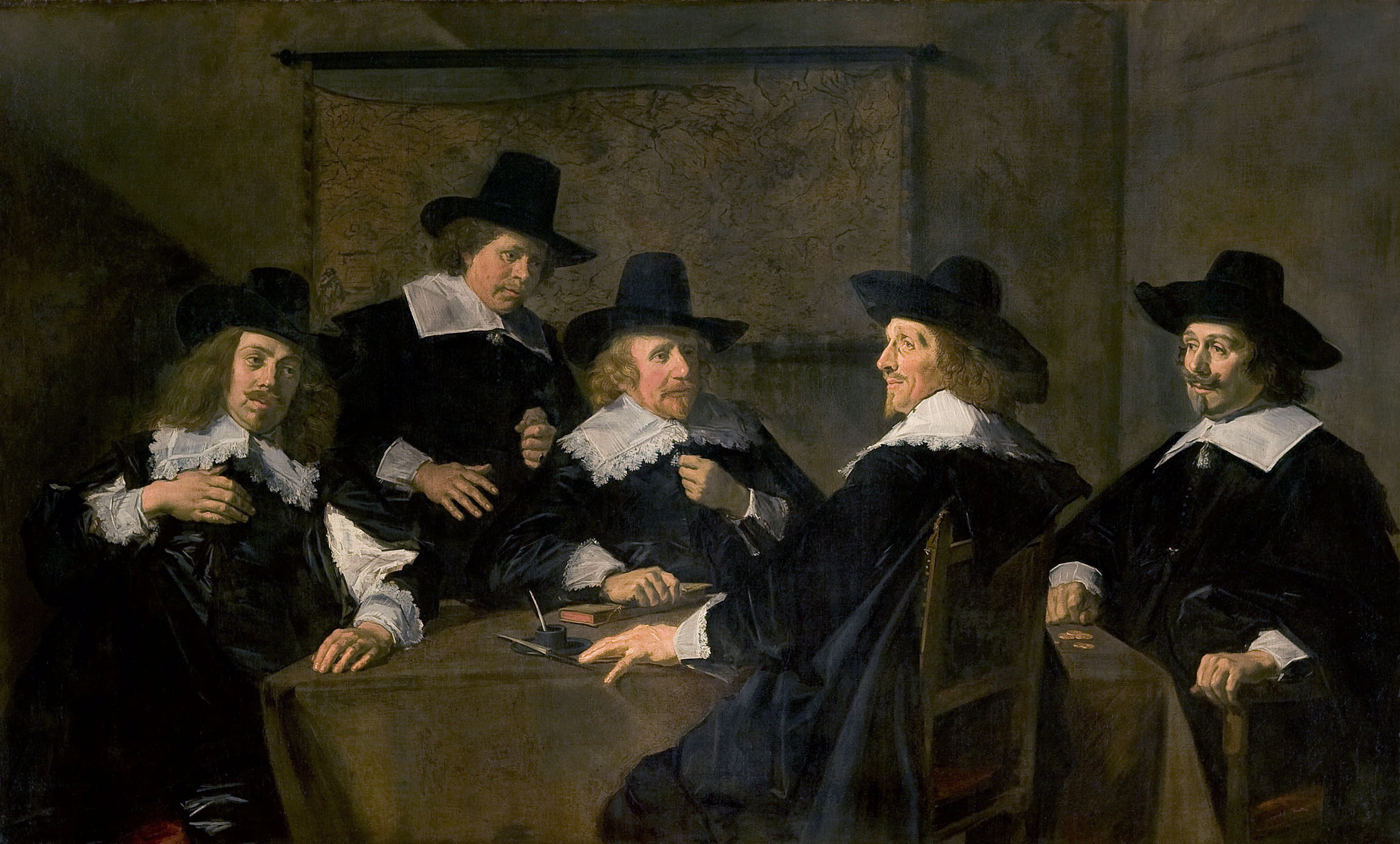
The regents of the St. Elisabeth Gasthuis, by Hals in 1641

He was born and baptized (3 August 1600) in Haarlem as the son of Lambert Wouters and Magdalena Pieters van der Straten, owners of the brewery "Druyff". He was the brother of Lambert with whom he was portrayed along with the rest of the officers of the local St. George militia in Frans Hals' painting The Officers of the St George Militia Company in 1639. He was a lieutenant of the white brigade and his brother Lambert Woutersz was the flag bearer of the orange brigade. From 1648 he was captain, and still later colonel, and in 1641 he was also painted by Hals as a regent of the St. Elisabeth Gasthuis, Haarlem.

He died 10 December 1661 in Haarlem.
