= Aart Jansz Druyvesteyn =

Dutch painter, lawyer and mayor (1577–1627)

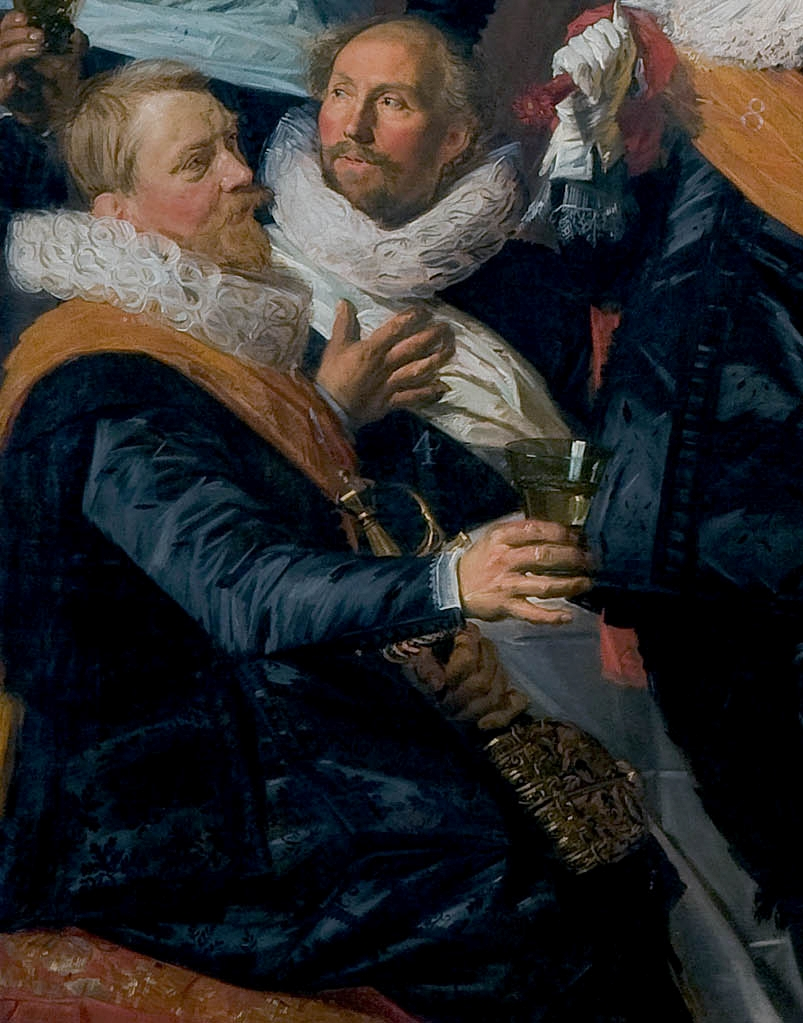
- 'Aart Jansz Druyvesteyn in group portrait by Frans Hals in 1627.
- Born: Aert Jansz Druyvesteyn; 1577; Haarlem
- Died: 1627 (aged 49–50); Haarlem
- Known for: Painting
- Movement: Baroque

Aernout or Aart Jansz Druyvesteyn (1577 – 5 August 1627) was a Dutch Golden Age lawyer, painter, and mayor of Haarlem.

== Biography ==
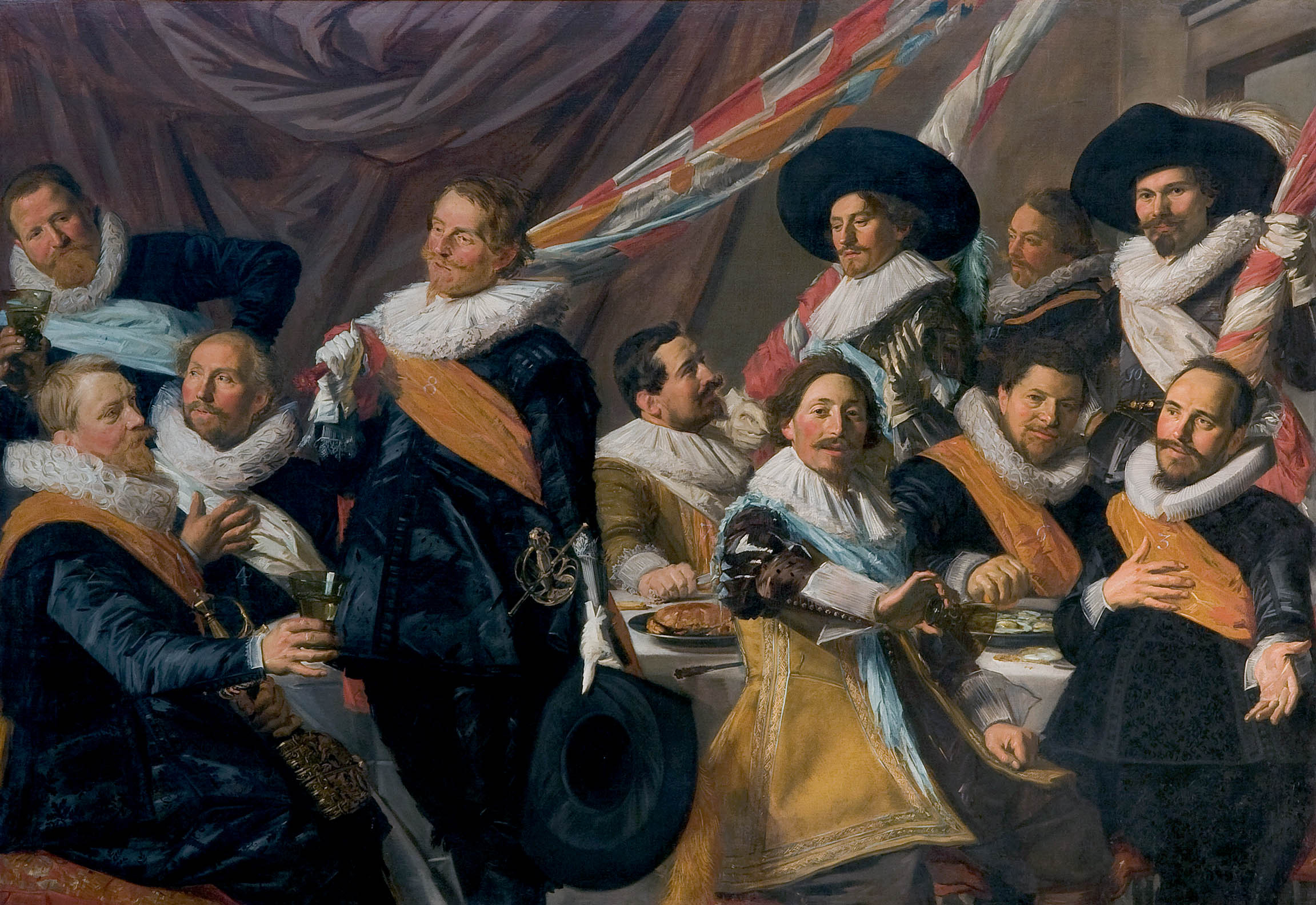
Banquet of the officers of the St. Jorisdoelen, painted in 1627.

According to Van Mander in 1604, he was a promising young landscape painter who came from a good family in Haarlem, and thus painted as a hobby, rather than professionally. In April 1606 he married Anna de Wael, the daughter of the Haarlem mayor Johan de Wael, and they had two sons, Jacob who followed in his father's footsteps, and Johannes, who died childless in Venice in 1681.

According to Houbraken, who echoes Van Mander's comment that he became a good landscape painter, he became an elder in the Dutch Reformed church before eventually becoming mayor of Haarlem. Houbraken reports that he died on August 5, 1617, aged 50.

This date makes it very confusing for art historians, because catalogs from the Frans Hals museum have claimed for decades that this is the same person sitting at the head of the table in Frans Hals' civic guard (schutterij) group portrait The Banquet of the Officers of the St George Militia Company in 1627 which was painted ten years later.

According to the RKD he painted Italianate landscapes and died on August 5, 1627. This would place the occasion of painting the group portrait as the changing of the guards after the death of its most distinguished member.
