= Lambert Woutersz =

Brewer of Haarlem (1602–1655)

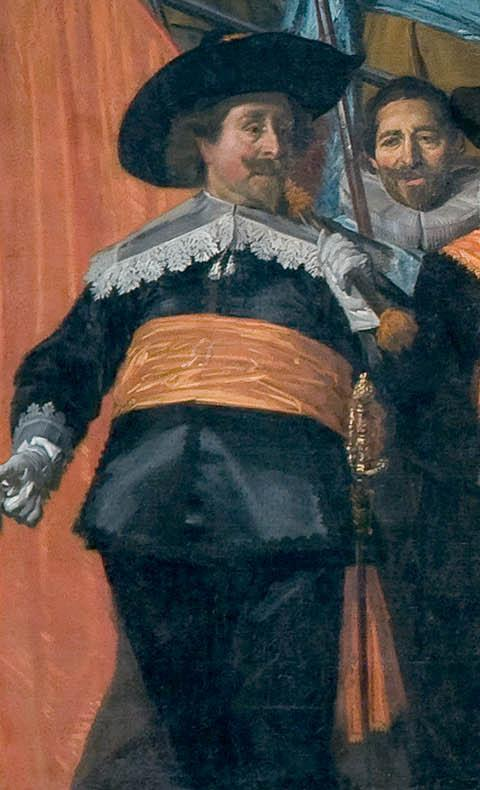
Lambert Woutersz, detail of schutterstuk by Frans Hals in 1639

Lambert Woutersz (1602–1655), was a Dutch Golden Age brewer of Haarlem.

== Biography ==
He was born in Haarlem as the son of Lambert and Magdalena Pietersdr van der Straten, owners of the brewery "Druyff". He was the brother of Francois with whom he was portrayed along with the rest of the officers of the local St. George militia in Frans Hals' painting The Officers of the St George Militia Company in 1639. He was the flag bearer of the orange brigade and his brother Francois Woutersz was a lieutenant of the white brigade.

He died in Haarlem.
