= Haarlem schutterij =

Voluntary civic guard of Haarlem

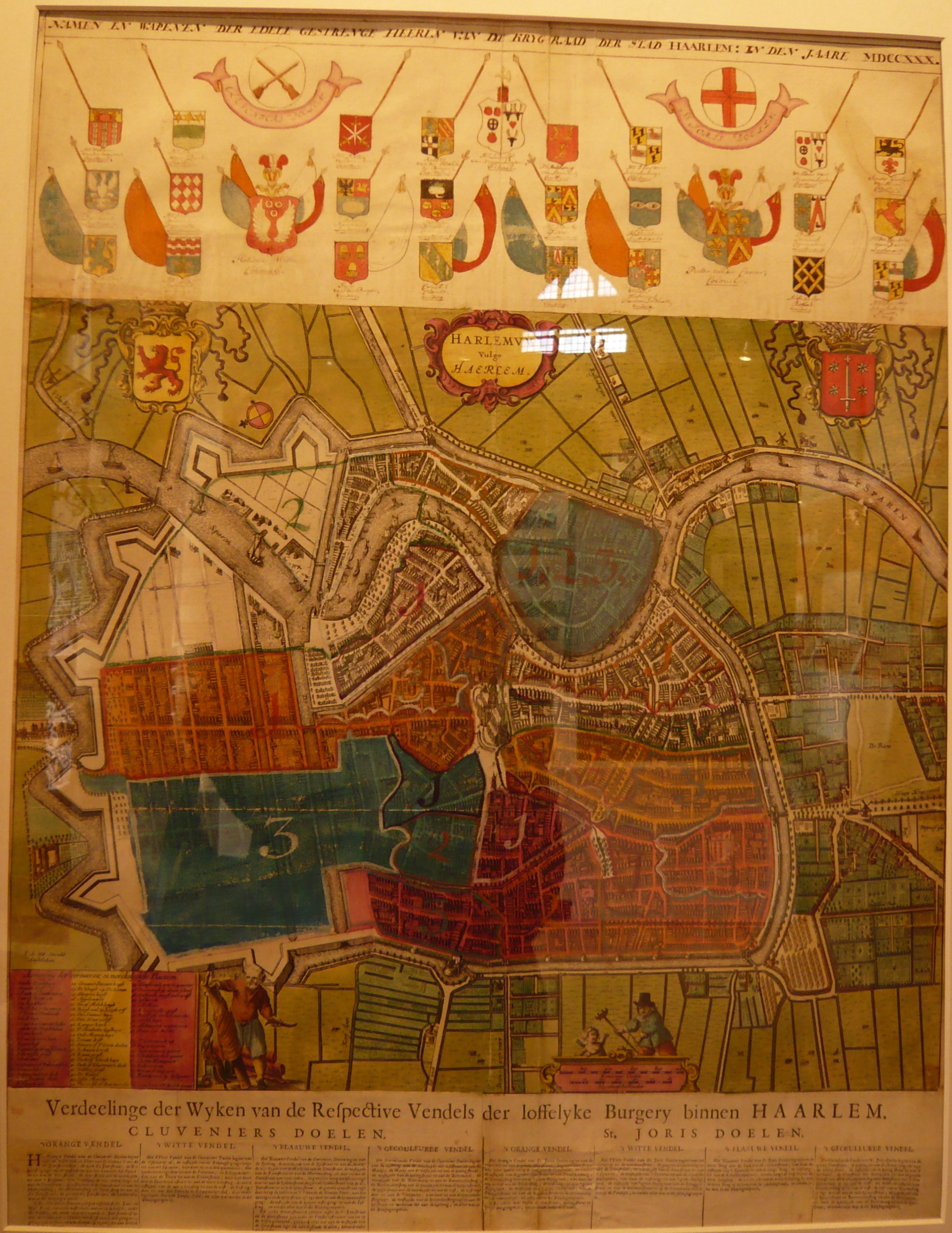
Old map of the various sections of Haarlem under the guardianship of the two main civic guards, the guard of St. Joris and the Cloveniers, or Calivermen.

The Haarlem schutterij refers to a collective name for the voluntary civic guard of Haarlem, from medieval times up to the Batavian Revolution in 1794, when the guilds of Haarlem were disbanded.

== History ==
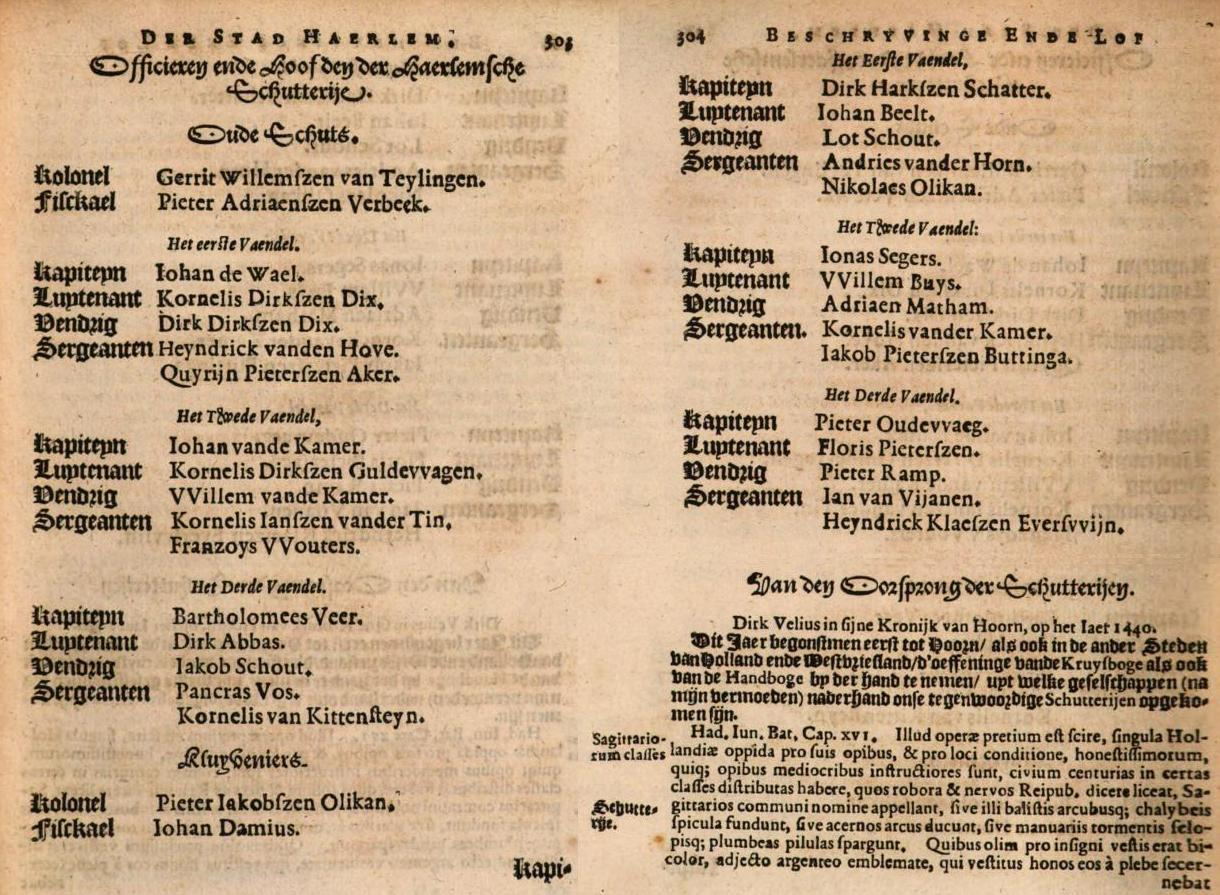
Pages from Samuel Ampzing's description of Haarlem listing the officers of the schutterij in 1628

During the Hook and Cod wars in 1402, Haarlem formed a hand bow schutterij under the patronage of St. George of 120 citizen volunteers to support the local court of Justice. The guild-like group had its own altar in the St. Bavochurch and they even had processions through town on the name day of their saint. The town suffered from uprisings in 1417 and 1422. After another uprising in 1425, a "New" schutterij was formed to educate young men in the use of the crossbow and they defended the city in 1426 against Jacoba of Beieren. The "New" crossbow schutterij had a new meeting hall built for them near the Spaarne river, and in 1468 a separate schutterij was formed under the patronage of St. Sebastian for hand bowmen. Around 1500 Haarlem had three schutterij groups, two (old and new) under the patronage of St. George (St. Joris), and one under the patronage of St. Sebastian, all with their own altars in church.

In 1520 the Haarlem schutterij was reorganized; the two groups under St. Joris were merged into one group for crossbowmen and a new group was formed under the patron saint St. Hadrian (St. Adrian), called Cloveniers. Though the St. Sebastian group was also still active, by 1560 all were using muskets, and the town even owned some cannons, for which special "kannoniers" were trained. They still kept up their social activities in church, though the Protestant Reformation began to cause various problems with their political support for the court of Justice.

The most heroic deeds of the Haarlem schutterij occurred during the Spanish siege of Haarlem, which ended in victory for the Spanish. After the changeover to the Dutch Republic in 1581, the Haarlem schutters, or shooters, were reorganized into two groups, one keeping the name St. Joris and also called the "Oude schuts", and the other keeping the name Cloveniers, and receiving a new building in their old location in the Gasthuisstraat in 1612, leading them to earn the nickname "Nieuwe schuts". The activities of both groups around their church altars, including the yearly processions, were discontinued. Today many of the shooters have been immortalized in the group portraits by Frans Hals and other portrait painters on show at the Frans Hals museum.

The split into two groups was more for convenience sake than for tradition, as the two groups were split geographically into a group north of the Bavochurch (officially renamed Grote Kerk) and a group south of the Bavochurch.

== Cloveniers ==
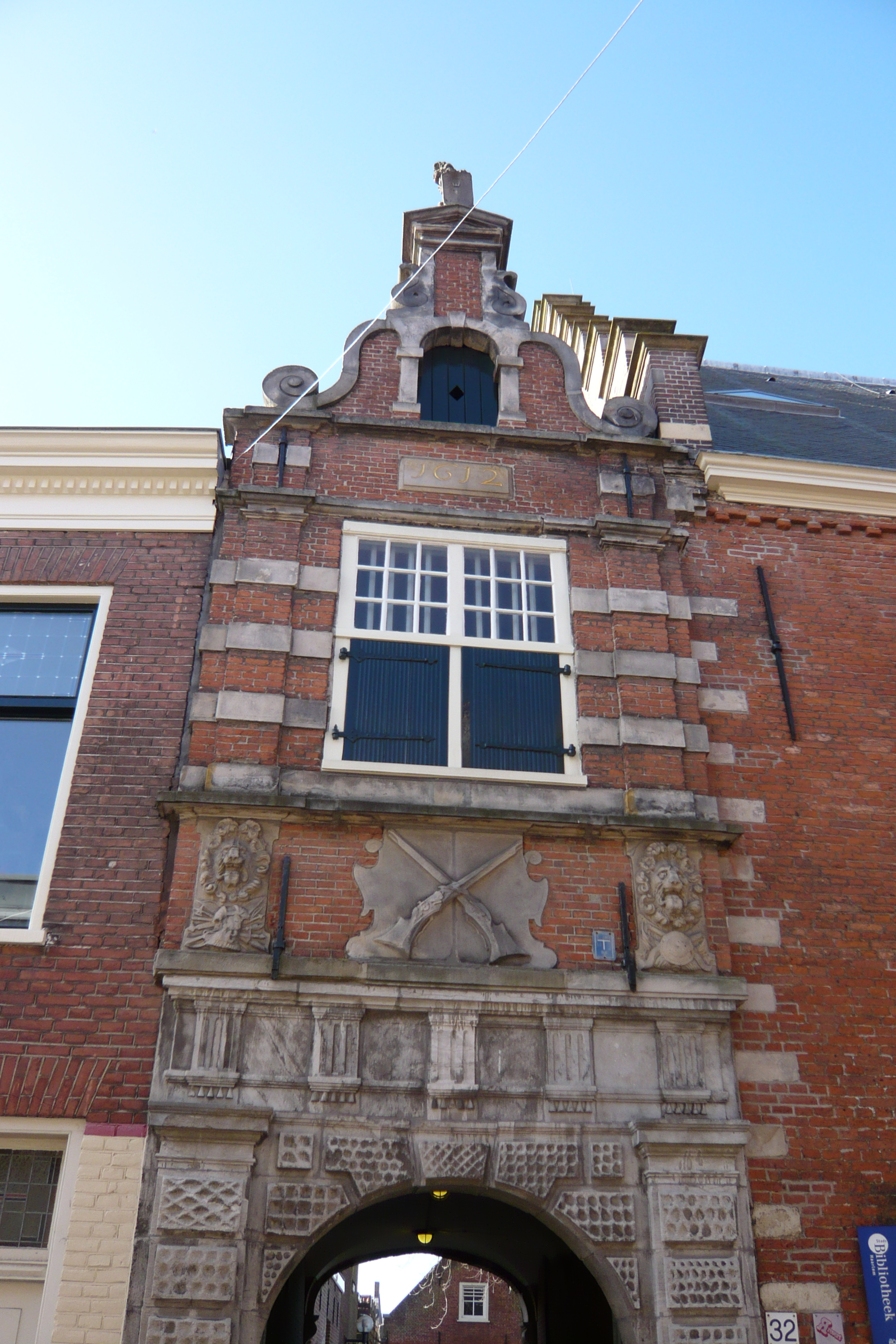
View of the keystone on the gatehouse to the Doelenplein around which the library is situated; it shows the weapons the 'shooters' carried.

The term "Cloveniers", or Cluveniers, just means "musket bearers". The group name changed over time according to the fashions and locations of the guild. Until the siege of Haarlem they were under the patronage of the Saint Adrian, but were most often referred to as the "Jonge schuts", or "New shoots", since they were formed in 1520. After the siege, since all "Catholic" saints were banned, and they had a new meeting hall built in 1612, they became known as the "Nieuwe schuts", or "New shoots". That meeting hall in the Gasthuisstraat is still called the "Doelen" building after them. Today it is a study hall and part of the Haarlem Public Library. The paintings by Hals and others hung in the main hall of the building in the Gasthuisstraat. Today almost all of the schutterstukken that once hung here have been transferred to the Frans Hals Museum; the 1612 painting by Cornelis Engelsz is in the Musée des Beaux-Arts de Strasbourg, France.

=== Group portraits of the Cloveniers ===
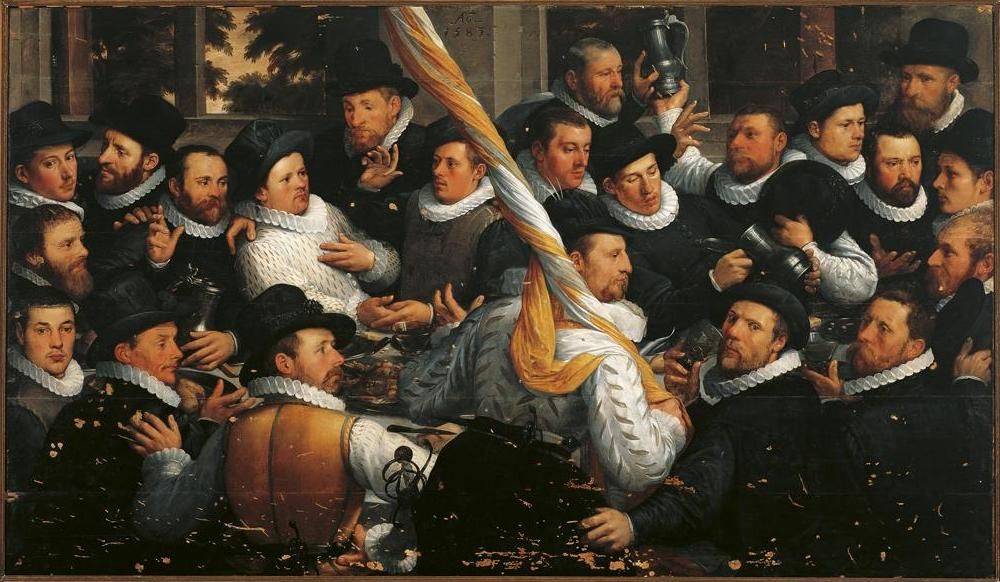
1583, by Cornelis van Haarlem

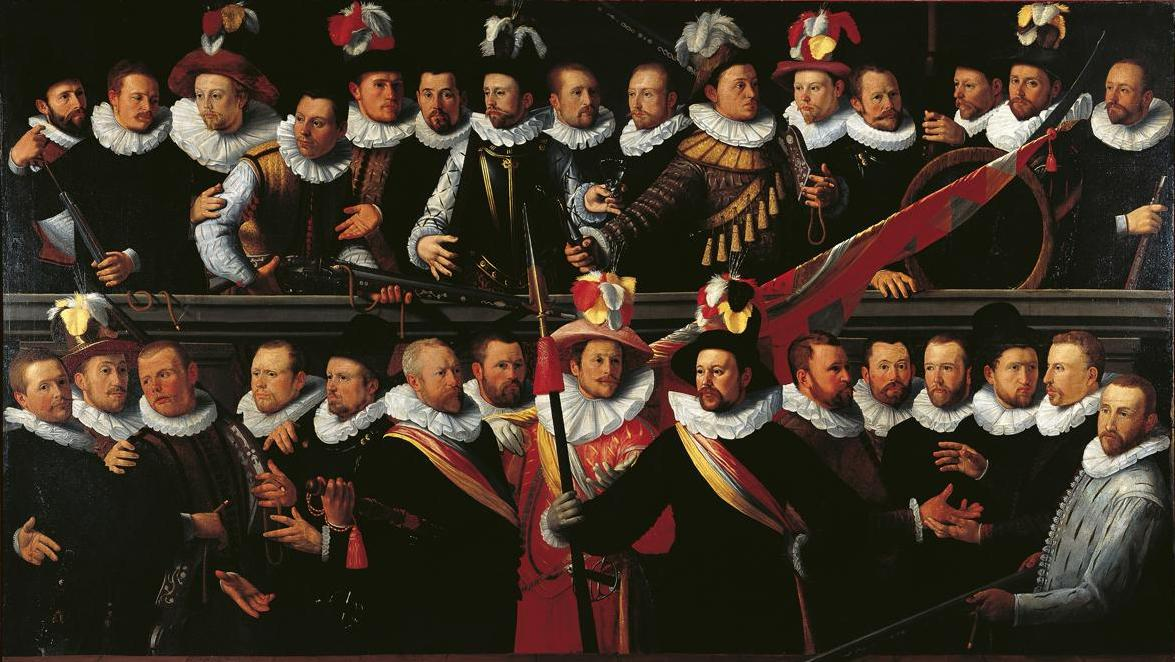
1594, unknown artist

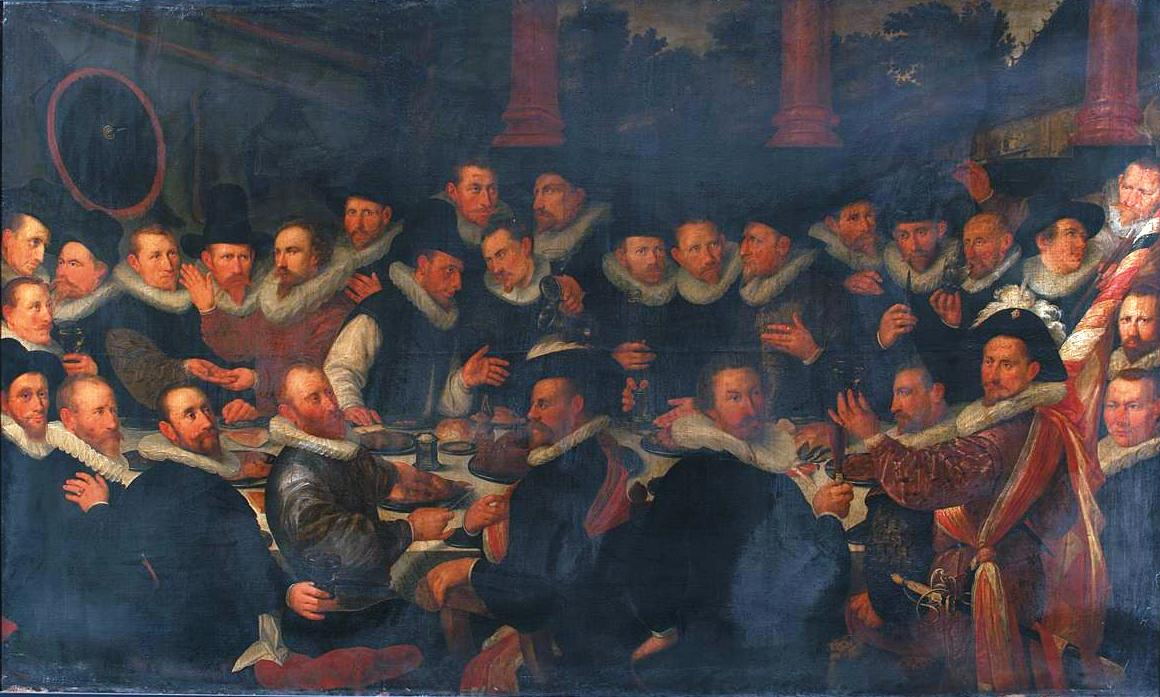
1600, by Frans Pietersz de Grebber

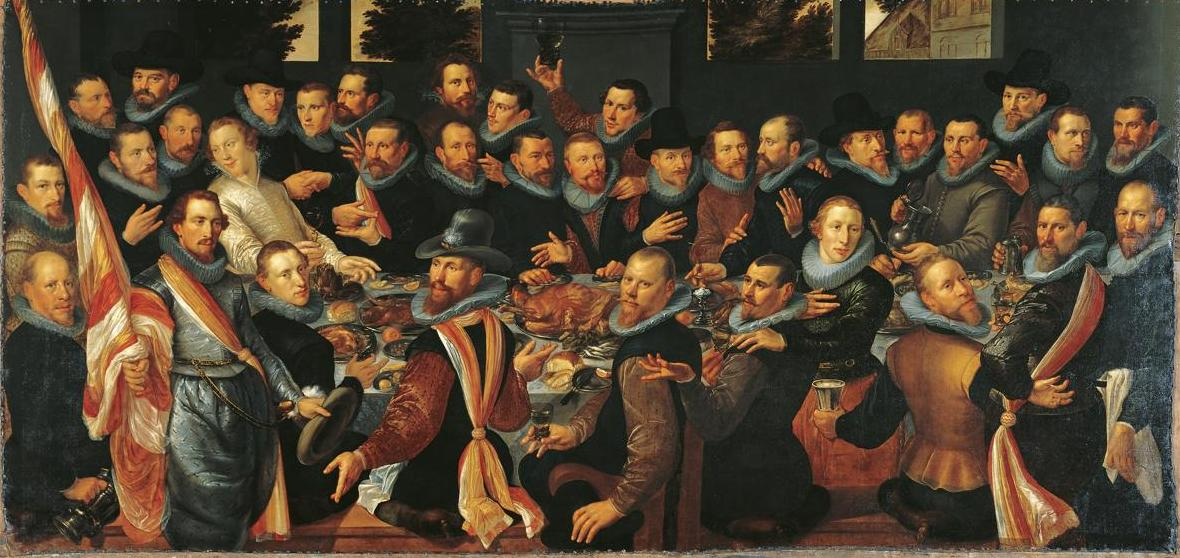
1610, by Frans Pietersz de Grebber

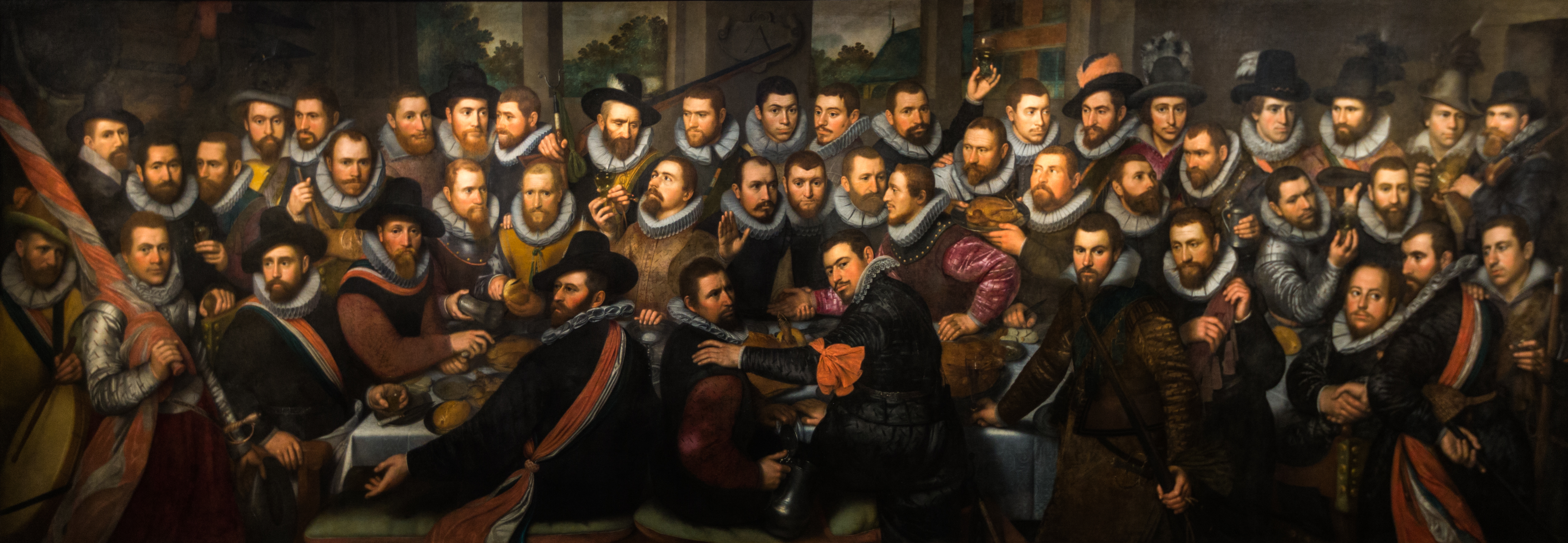
The St Adrian Civic Guard, 1612, by Cornelis Engelsz.

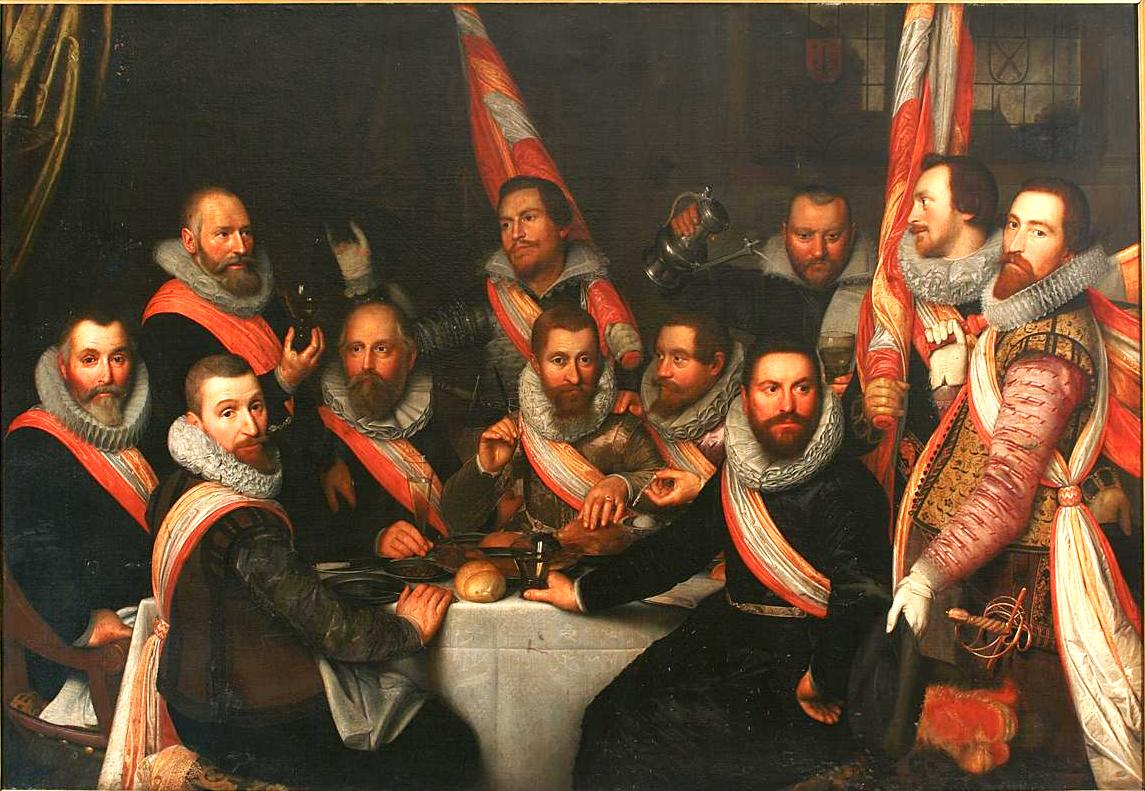
1618, by Cornelis Engelsz.

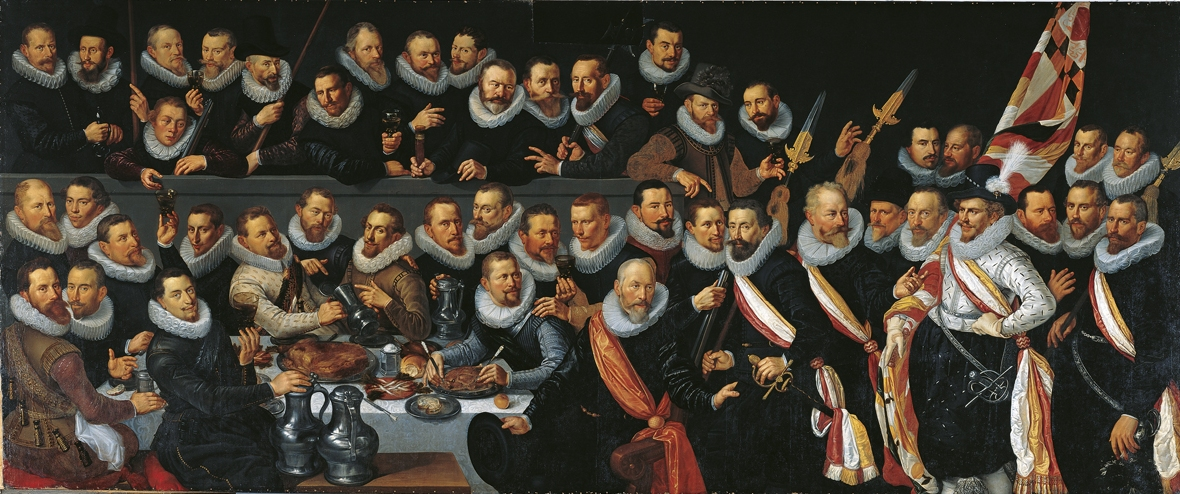
1619, by Frans Pietersz de Grebber

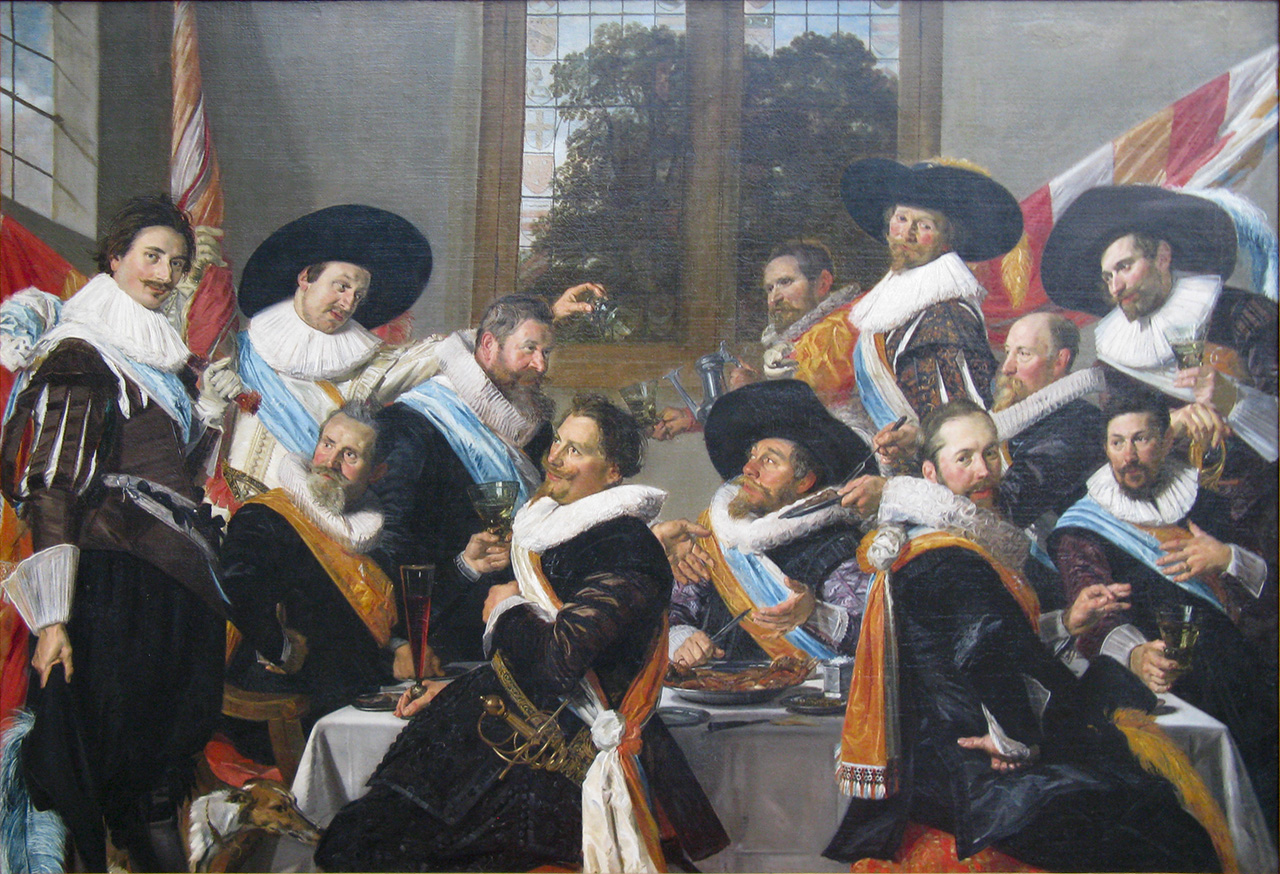
The Banquet of the Officers of the St Adrian Militia Company in 1627, by Frans Hals

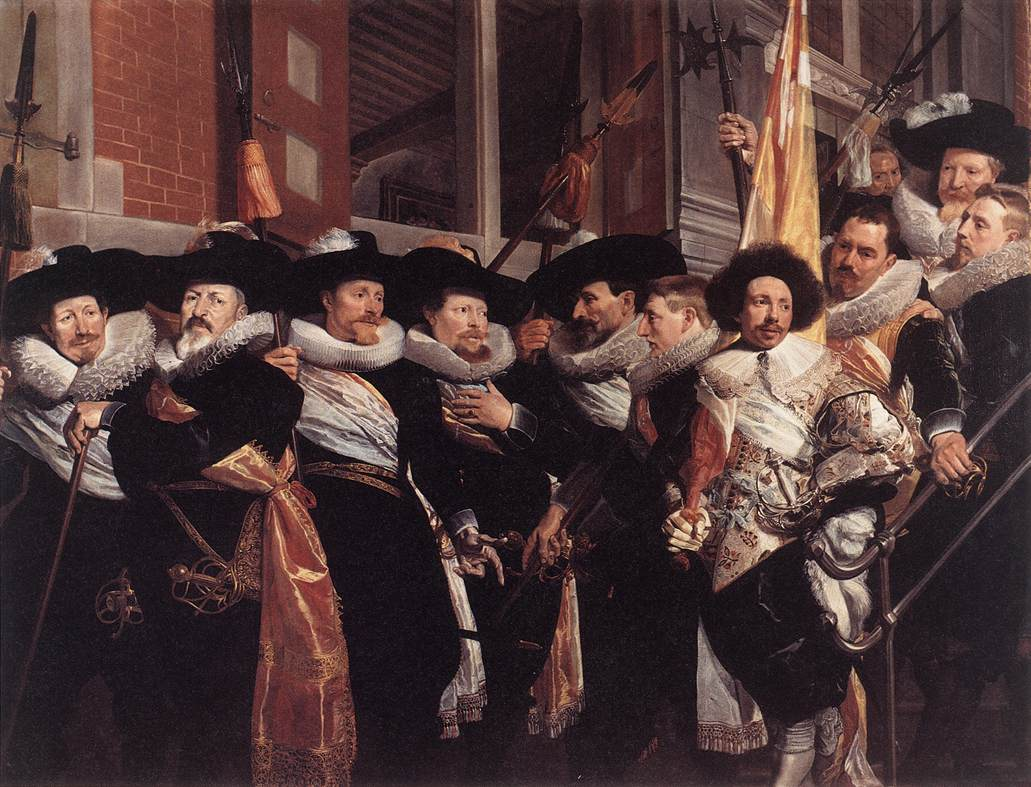
The Officers of the St Adrian Militia Company in 1630, by Hendrik Gerritsz Pot

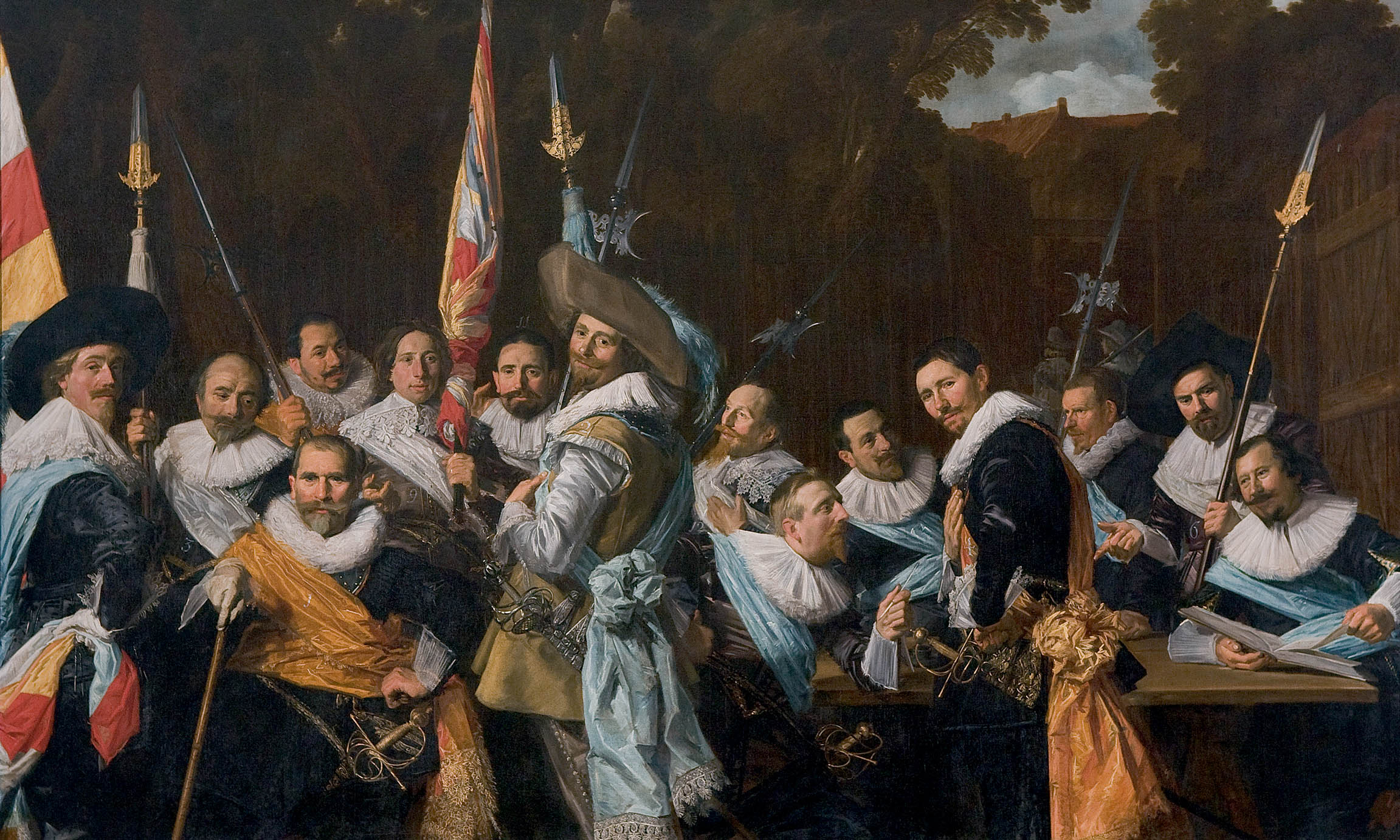
The Officers of the St Adrian Militia Company in 1633, by Frans Hals

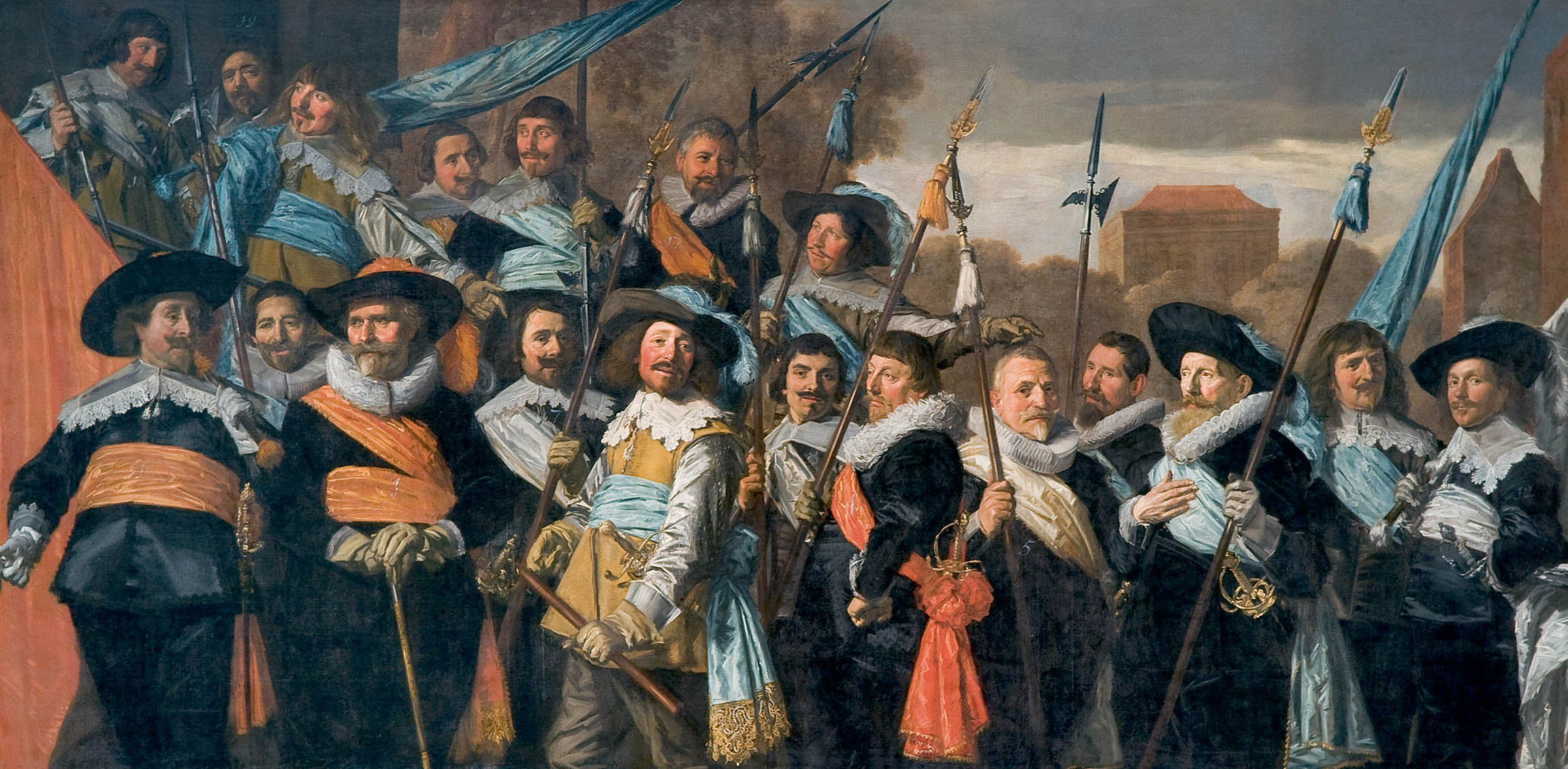
The Officers of the St George Militia Company in 1639, by Frans Hals

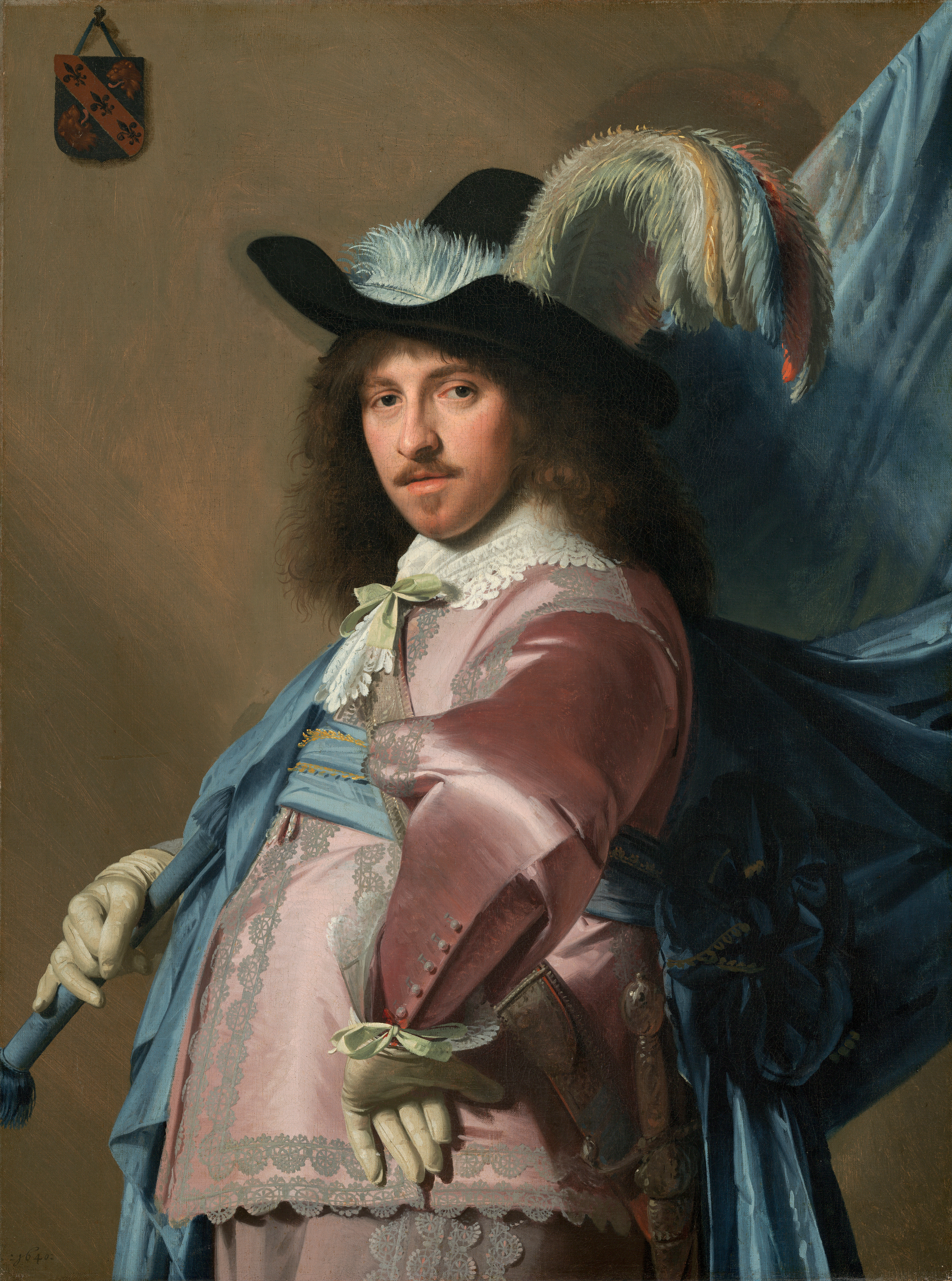
Ensign Andries Stilte, 1640, by Johannes Cornelisz Verspronck

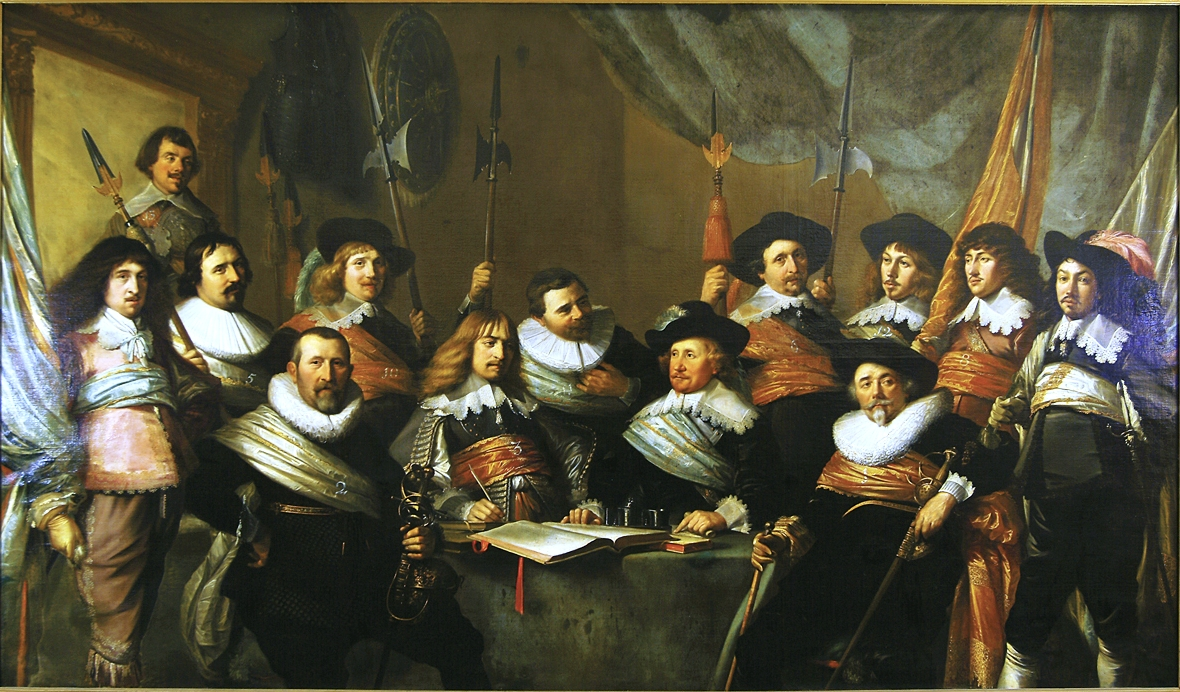
1642, by Pieter Soutman

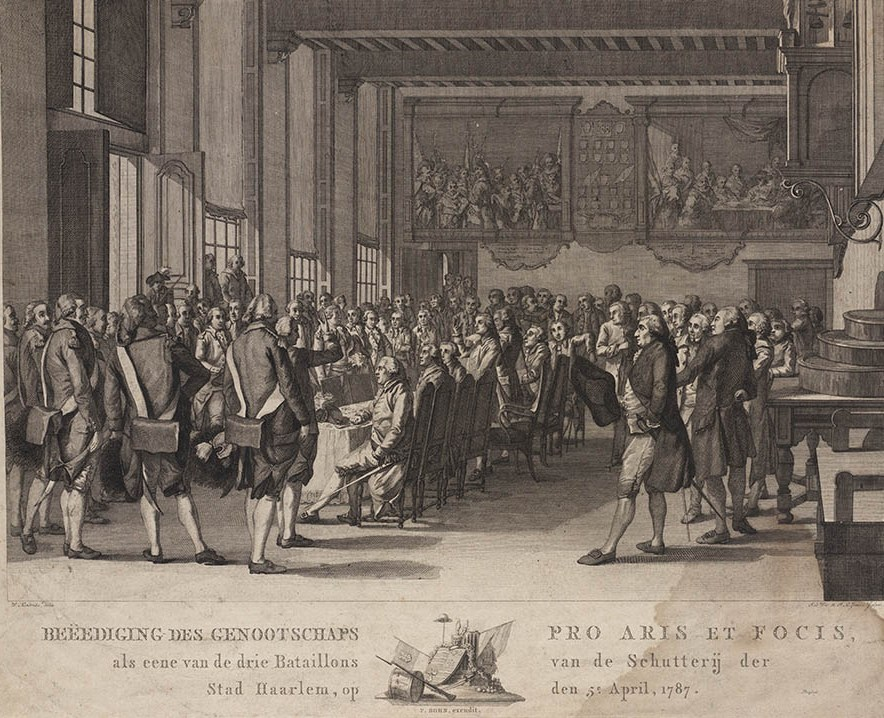
1787, by Wybrand Hendriks

== St. Jorisdoelen ==
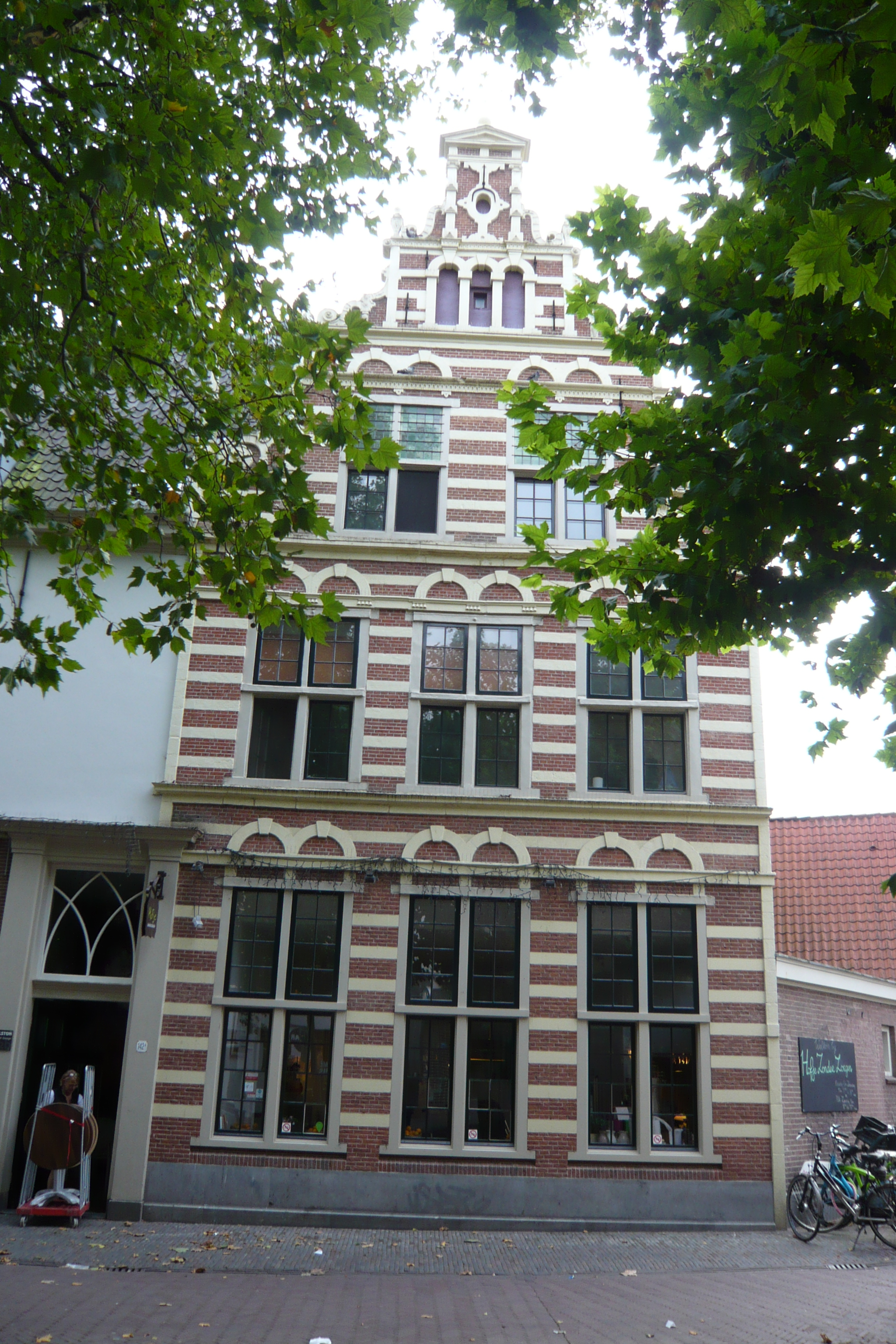
View of one of the halls of the St. Jorisdoelen, built in 1592

In 1577, the city council refurbished the main buildings of the old St. Michiels cloister to house the schutterij called the "Oude schuts", whose hall had been burned in the fire of 1572. Though they officially no longer had a patron saint, they were still referred to as the St. Jorisdoelen, or St. George militia target field. The former garden was converted to include two shooting lanes, and a new meeting hall was built in 1592. Today the location houses a shop, restaurant, and a hofje surrounds the garden called the Proveniershuis.

=== Group portraits of the St. Jorisdoelen ===
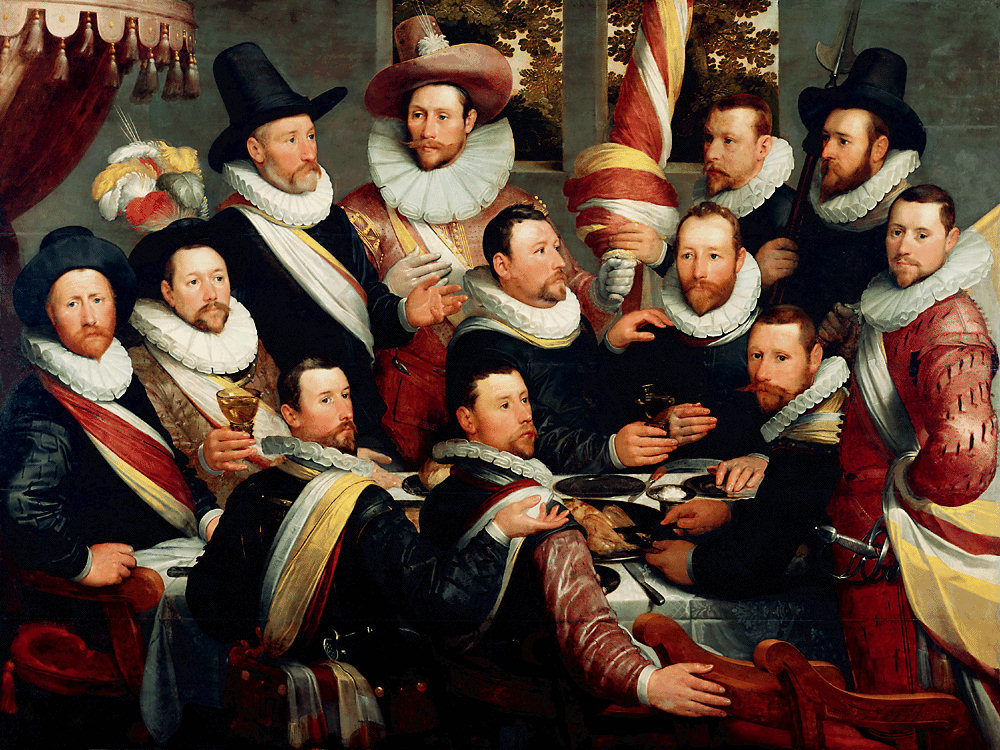
1599, by Cornelis van Haarlem

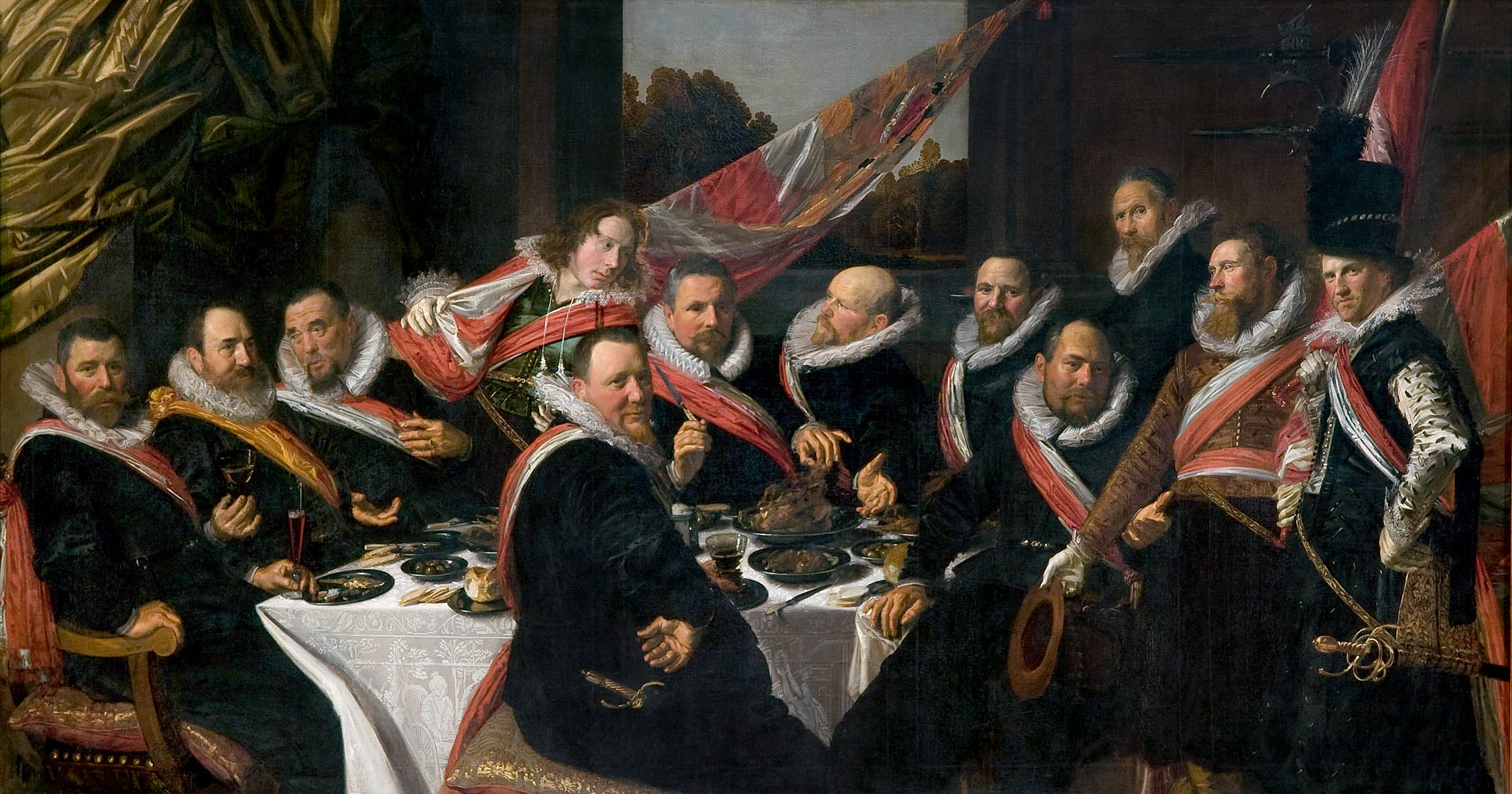
The Banquet of the Officers of the St George Militia Company in 1616, by Frans Hals

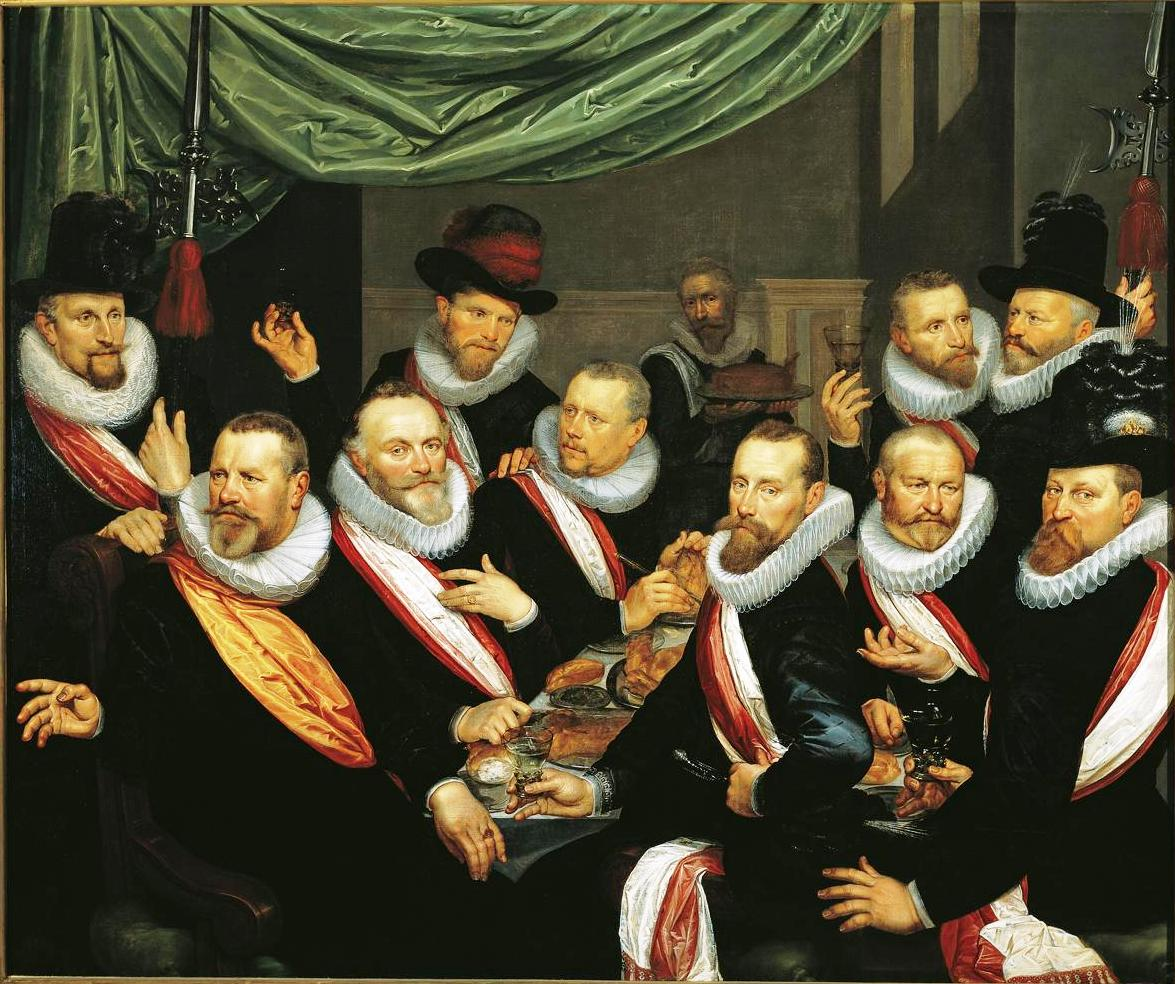
1618, by Frans Pietersz de Grebber

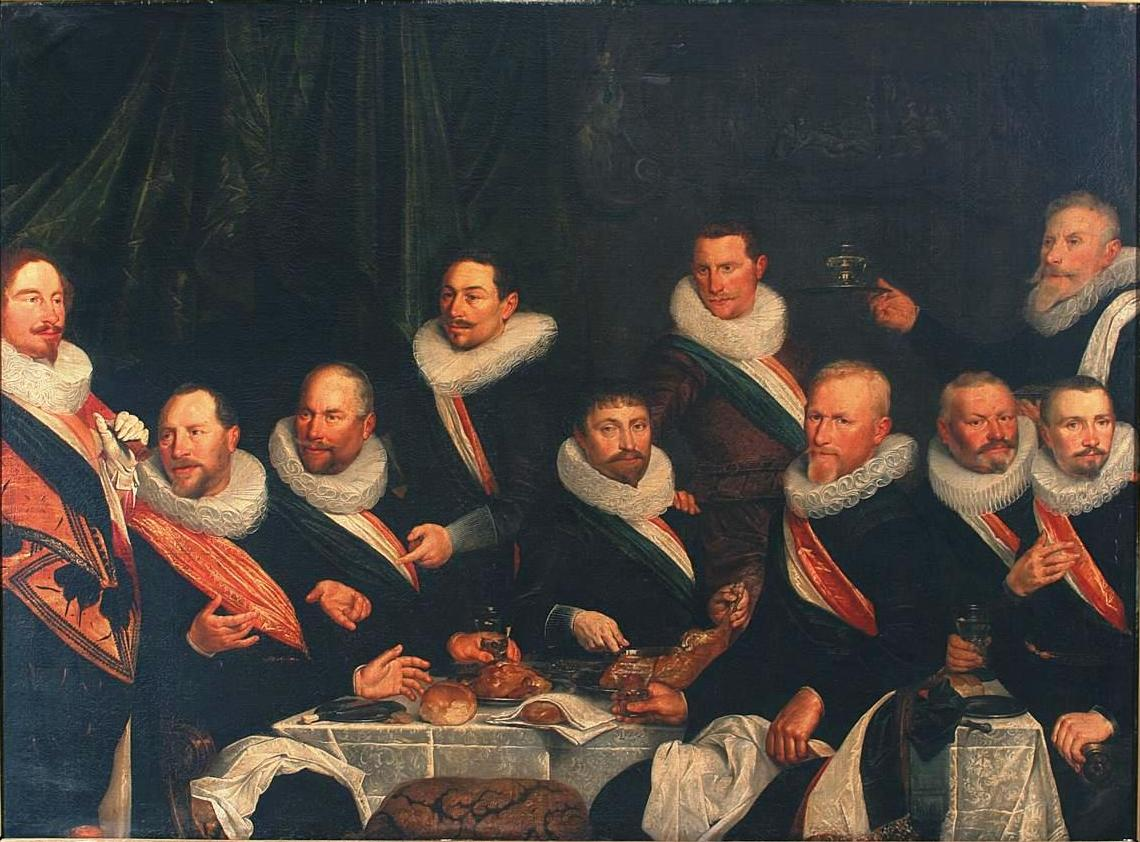
1624, by Frans Pietersz de Grebber

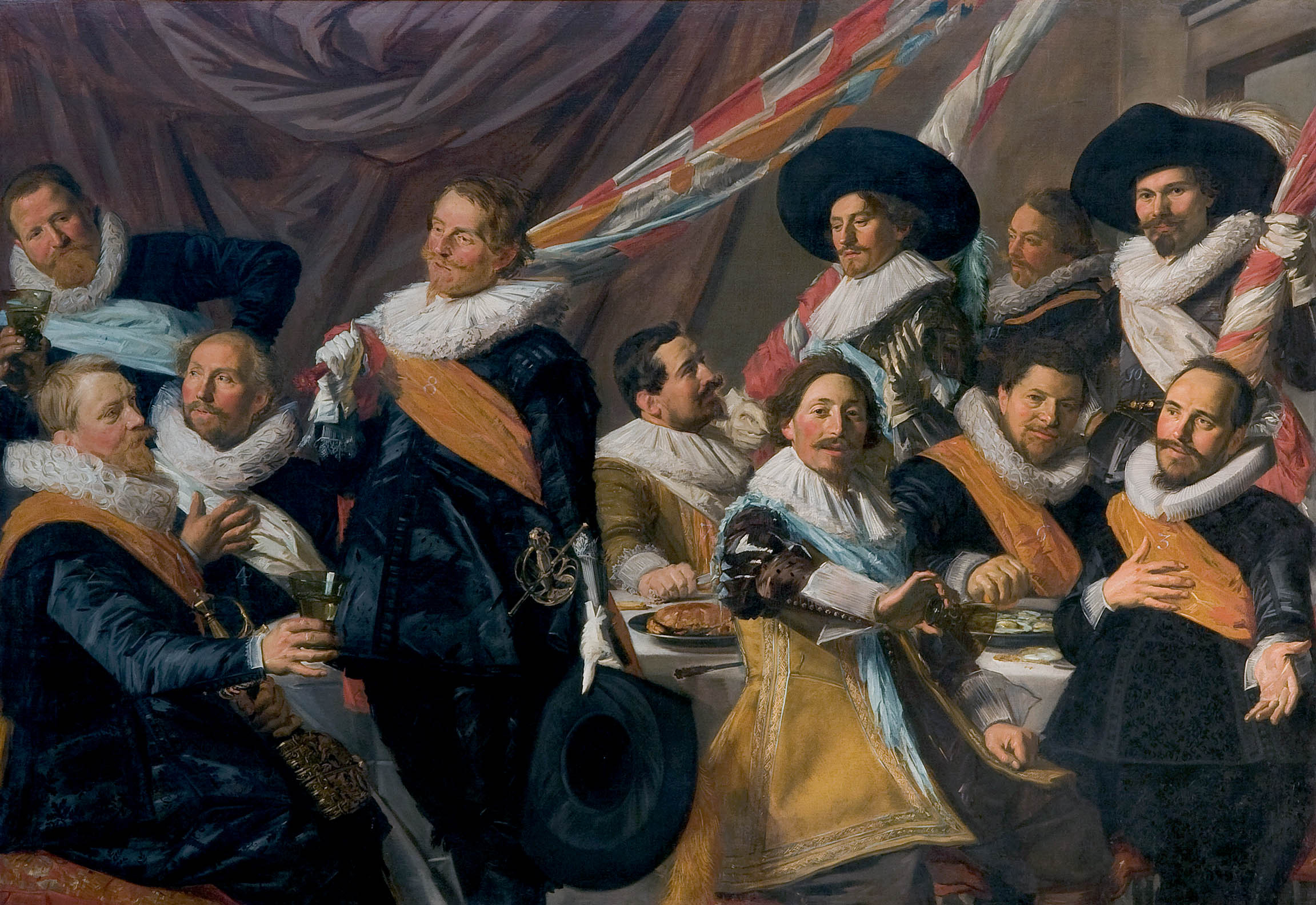
The Banquet of the Officers of the St George Militia Company in 1627, by Frans Hals

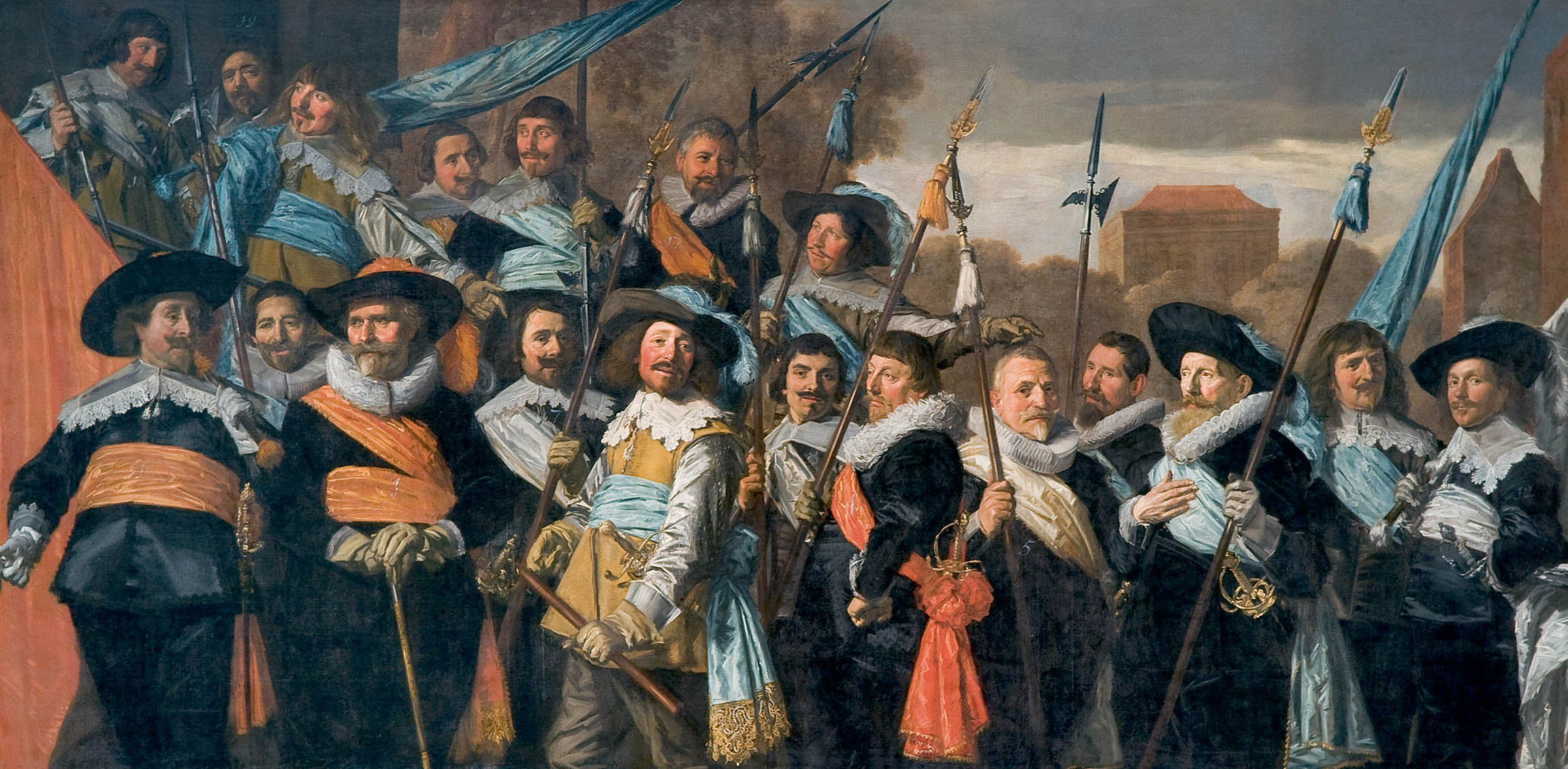
The Officers of the St George Militia Company in 1639, by Frans Hals

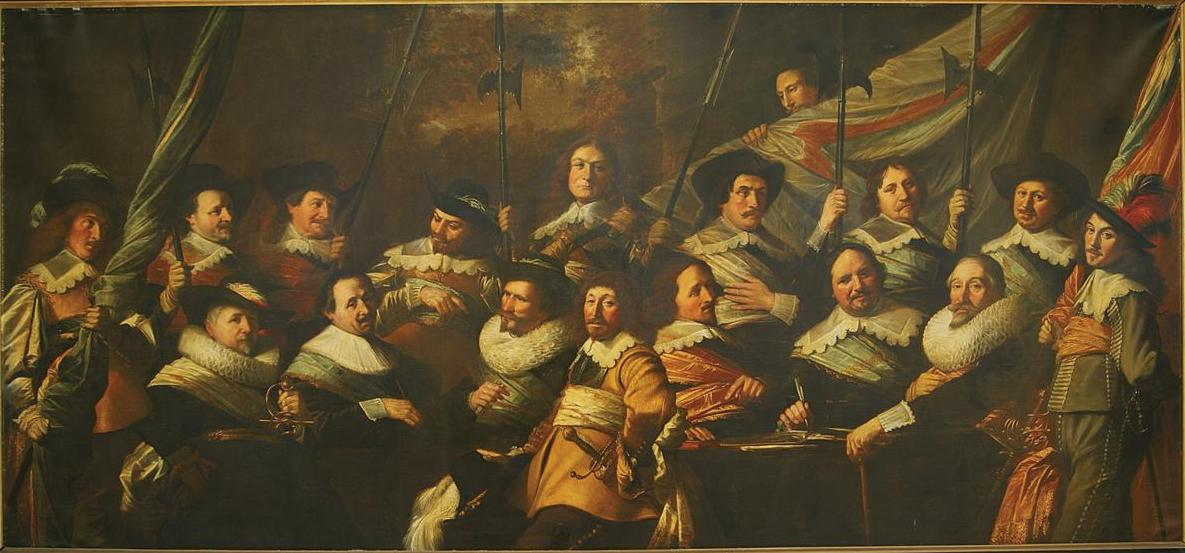
1644, by Pieter Soutman
