= Koning =

Koning is the Dutch and Afrikaans word for "king" and thus may refer to the King of the Netherlands or the King of Belgium. Old spelling variations include Coning, Coninck, Köning, Koninck, Koningh, Konink, and Kooning.

"Koning" and "De Koning" are quite common Dutch surnames and may refer to:

- Ans Koning (1923–2006), Dutch javelin thrower
- Arthur Koning (1944–2015), Dutch rower
- Christina Koning (b. 1954), British novelist and short story writer
- Elisabeth Koning (1917–1975), Dutch sprinter
- Elisabeth Johanna Koning (1816–1887), Dutch painter
- Gerry Koning (b. 1980), Dutch footballer
- Hans Koning (1921–2007), Dutch writer
- Henk Koning (1933–2016), Dutch tax official and politician
- Henry Koning (b. 1960), Dutch sailor
- Jacob Koning, alternate spelling of Jacob Koninck (c.1615–c.1695), Dutch painter (brother of Philips)
- Jean Koning (b. 1976), Dutch actor, director, musician and author
- Karen Koning AbuZayd (b. 1941), American diplomat
- Marcel Koning (b. 1975), Dutch footballer
- Martine Wittop Koning (1870–1963), Dutch nutrition expert and writer of cook books
- Michel Koning (b. 1984), Dutch tennis player
- Peter Koning (b. 1990), Dutch racing cyclist
- Philips Koning, alternate spelling of Philips Koninck (1619–1688), Dutch painter (brother of Jacob)
- Theo Koning (b. 1950), Dutch-born Australian painter
- Victor Koning (1842–1894), French playwright and librettist
- Willemien Koning-Hoeve (born 1965), Dutch politician

De Koning:

- Bill DeKoning (1918–1979), American baseball catcher
- Coen de Koning (1879–1954), Dutch medal-winning speed skater
- Coen de Koning (b. 1983), Dutch sailor
- Hans de Koning (b. 1960), Dutch football player and coach
- Jan de Koning (1926–1994), Dutch government minister from 1977 to 1987
- Jan de Koning (b. 1949), Dutch footballer
- Louis de Koning (b. 1967), Dutch racing cyclist
- Marcelien de Koning (b. 1978), Dutch medal-winning sailor
- Mirjam de Koning (b. 1969), Dutch medal-winning swimmer
- Peter de Koning (b. 1960), Dutch pop singer
- Sam De Koning (b. 2001), Australian rules footballer for Geelong, brother of Tom and son of Terry
- Terry De Koning (b. 1961), Australian rules footballer for Footscray, father of Sam and Tom
- Tom De Koning (b. 1999), Australian rules footballer for Carlton, brother of Sam and son of Terry

De Koningh:

- Leendert de Koningh (1777–1849), Dutch marine and landscape painter
- Michael de Koningh (1958–2016), British music journalist

== See also ==
- De Coninck
- De Koninck
- Konings
- Konink (disambiguation)
- Kooning (disambiguation)
- Koning en Koning, Dutch children's picture book
