= De Koninck =

De Koninck (The King in old Dutch spelling) is a surname. Notable people with the surname include:

- Charles De Koninck (1906–1965), Belgian-Canadian Thomist philosopher and theologian
- David de Koninck alternative spelling of David de Coninck (c.1644 – 1701), Flemish painter
- Jean-Marie De Koninck (born 1948), Quebec mathematician
- Laurent-Guillaume de Koninck (1809–1887), Belgian palaeontologist and chemist
- Lodewijk de Koninck (1838–1924), Flemish writer
- Louis Herman De Koninck (1896–1984), Belgian architect and designer
- Luk De Koninck (born 1952), Belgian television actor
- Servaes de Koninck (c.1654 – c.1701), Flemish composer active in Amsterdam
- Thomas De Koninck (1934–2026), Canadian philosopher

Koninck:

- Jacob Koninck (I) (c.1615 – c.1695), Dutch landscape painter (brother of Philips)
- Jacob Koninck (II) (c.1647 – c.1724), Dutch painter for the Danish court (son of Jacob I)
- Philips Koninck (1619–1688), Dutch landscape painter (brother of Jacob I)
- Salomon Koninck, Dutch painter of genre scenes and portraits and engraver

== See also ==
- De Koninck Brewery, a Belgian brewery
- De Coninck
- De Koning
