= Daniel de Koninck =

Dutch painter

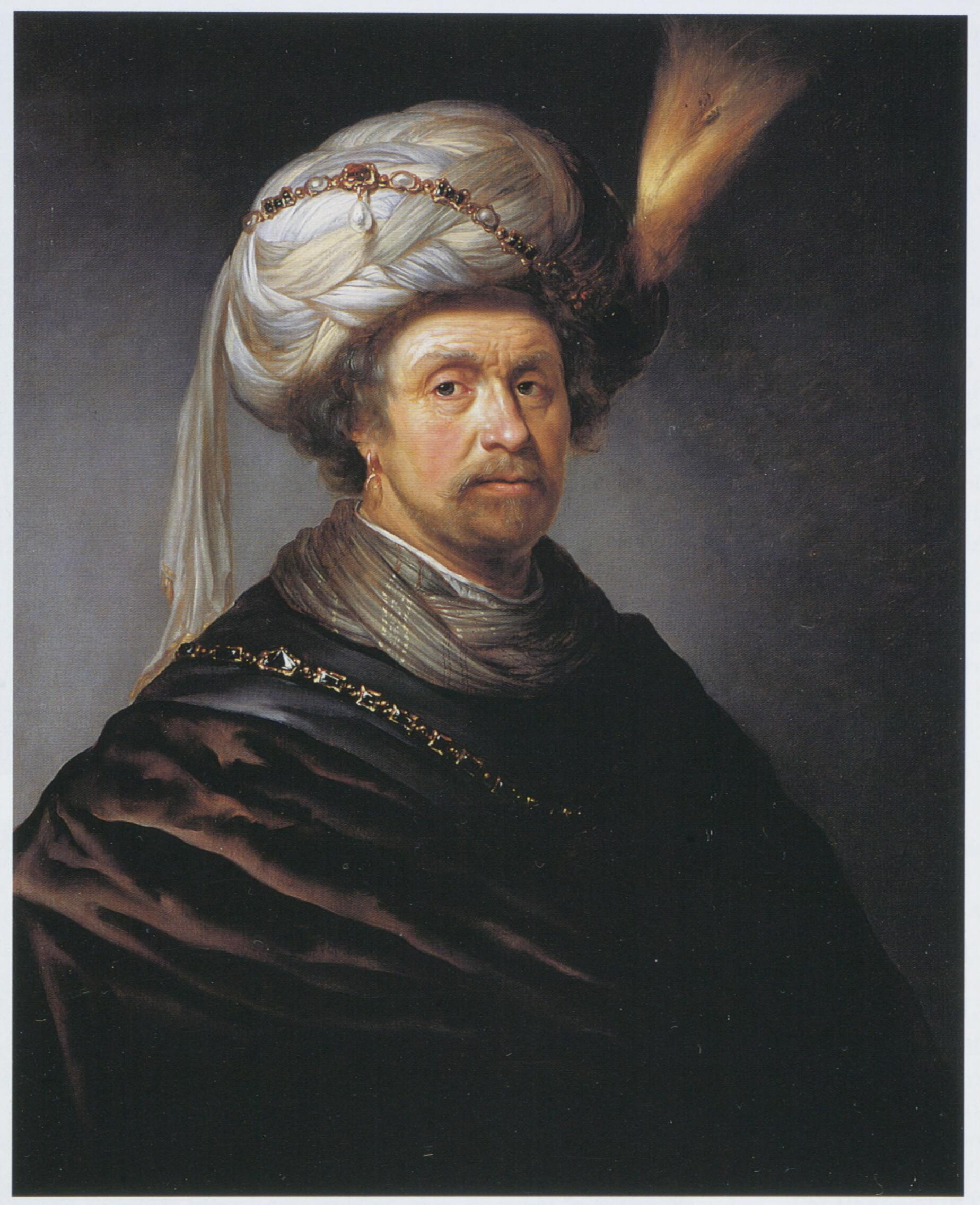
Man in a turban

Daniël de Koninck (1668–1730) was a painter from the Dutch Republic.

== Biography ==
He was born in Amsterdam and is known for genre works and portraits in the manner of Rembrandt. From 1687 to 1690 he was apprenticed to his uncle, Jacob Koninck, at that time an artist at the court in Copenhagen, but in 1690, at the age of twenty-two, he moved to England where he specialized in portraits and tronies in the manner of Rembrandt.

He was the nephew of the artist Philips Koninck.

He died in England.
