= ArtButMakeItSports =

Social media account

- Website type: Social media account
- Available in: English
- Country of origin: United States
- Creator: LJ Rader
- Website: twitter.com/ArtButSports instagram.com/artbutmakeitsports
- Launched: December 2019; 6 years ago
- Current status: Online

ArtButMakeItSports is a group of social media accounts dedicated to finding works of art that closely resemble contemporary sports photographs. Launched in December 2019 on Twitter (now X) and Instagram by American sports analyst and art enthusiast LJ Rader, the accounts have become a viral phenomenon, amassing hundreds of thousands of followers.

In 2026, Rader published a collection of new and previous pairings in a book Art But Make It Sports: Epic Matchups Where Art and Sports Collide.

== History ==
LJ Rader launched ArtButMakeItSports in December 2019 after he began posting pictures of works of art with sports-inspired captions on his personal Instagram account. A sports professional raised in Westchester County, New York, who has worked as a writer, reporter, and analyst, Rader's only formal art education was an art history course he took at Vanderbilt University, but he routinely visits art museums as an enthusiast and keeps a folder containing thousands of photographs of artwork on his phone.

In a 2023 interview, Rader said his "most viral" post came in May 2022, when he paired a photo of basketball player Luka Dončić sneering at opposing player Devin Booker with a 1615 Jusepe de Ribera painting, The Mocking of Christ.

After Rader collaborated with the Utah Jazz to create a video announcement for their 2023–24 schedule, the Jazz senior director of content Angie Treasure described him as "a savant," adding, "I remember everyone was shocked when they learned he wasn’t just putting photos through an A.I. generator." Rader has also partnered with the Atlanta Falcons, but says he does not actively seek out monetized opportunities.

On January 21, 2024, the National Football League's official X account posted a photograph of the football player Jason Kelce shirtless and screaming while holding a can of beer, tagging Rader's account with the message "what say you, @ArtButSports?" Rader replied less than 20 minutes later with a post pairing the image of Kelce with the 1654 Philips Koninck painting The Feast of Bacchus, which amassed over 95,000 likes and drew attention from The New York Times.

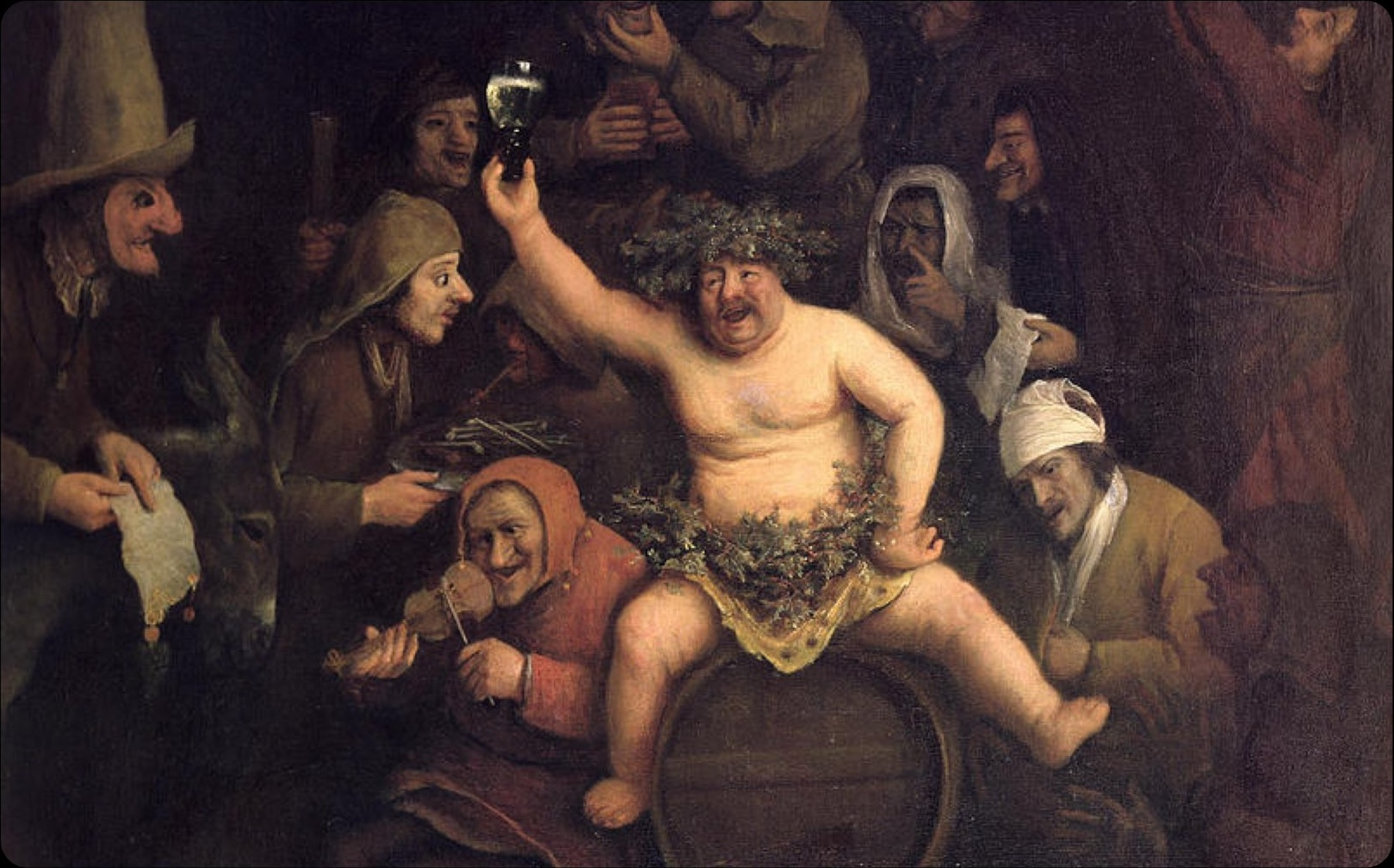
The Feast of Bacchus (1654) by Philips Koninck, as posted by Rader alongside the shirtless photograph of Jason Kelce

== Techniques ==
Rader uses a variety of techniques to find the works of art he posts, including drawing comparisons to colors, poses, and emotions depicted in the sports photographs. Some posts are inspired by a connection Rader instantly identifies between a photograph and a work of art, while others require him to search through online art databases to find a match, often pulling from the styles or motifs of a particular artist. Rader often also rotates and crops the images to emphasize their correspondences.

In response to various speculative accusations, Rader has maintained that he does not use artificial intelligence to find the works of art, both because his accounts predate popular tools such as ChatGPT, and because finding the art manually "keeps [him] sharp and gets [him] out of the house and gets [him] going to different galleries and shows and museums."

== Reception ==
ArtButMakeItSports has received widespread acclaim. In 2022, Sports Illustrated wrote that the response to the accounts has been "overwhelmingly positive," with many posts going viral and Rader only receiving hate comments from a single user.

Scott Cocciola of The New York Times praised the accounts' capacity to bring together the ostensibly distant art and sports communities, writing that Rader "has brought fine art to a new audience while showing the art world that beauty and emotion can surface in surprising places." Bryan Kobrosky of USA Today wrote that Rader has "an astonishing knowledge of the sports world and the art world, and his ability to blend the two together is unparalleled."
