= Coning =

Coning may refer to:

== People ==
- Cornelis Coning (1601–1671), Dutch engraver and mayor of Haarlem, brother of Frederik and Hendrick
- Frederik Coning (1594–1636), Dutch militia officer
- Hendrick Coning (1604–after 1660), Dutch militia officer
- Jacob Coning (c. 1647–1724), Dutch-Danish painter, painter to the Danish court

== Other uses ==
- Coning (aerodynamics), a helicopter phenomenon
- Coning or transforaminal herniation, in brain herniation, the downward movement of the cerebellar tonsils
- Coning, the act of placing traffic cones on the hood of self-driving cars

== See also ==
- Koning, a surname
