= Konings =

Konings is a Dutch surname and may refer to:

- Ad Konings (born 1956), Dutch ichthyologist
- Anthony Konings (1821–1884), Dutch Catholic priest and Redemptorist professor
- Jean Konings (1886–1974), Belgian sprinter
- Giovanni Matteo Konings (died 1929), Zimbabwean Catholic prelate

See also:

- Koning
