= Deconinck =

Deconinck is a Dutch and Belgian surname. Notable people with the surname include:

- Bernard Deconinck (1936–2020), French track cyclist
- Jilke Deconinck (born 1995), Belgian footballer

== See also ==
- De Coninck
