= The Feast of Bacchus (Koninck) =

1654 oil painting by Philips Koninck

- Bacchusfeest (Dutch)
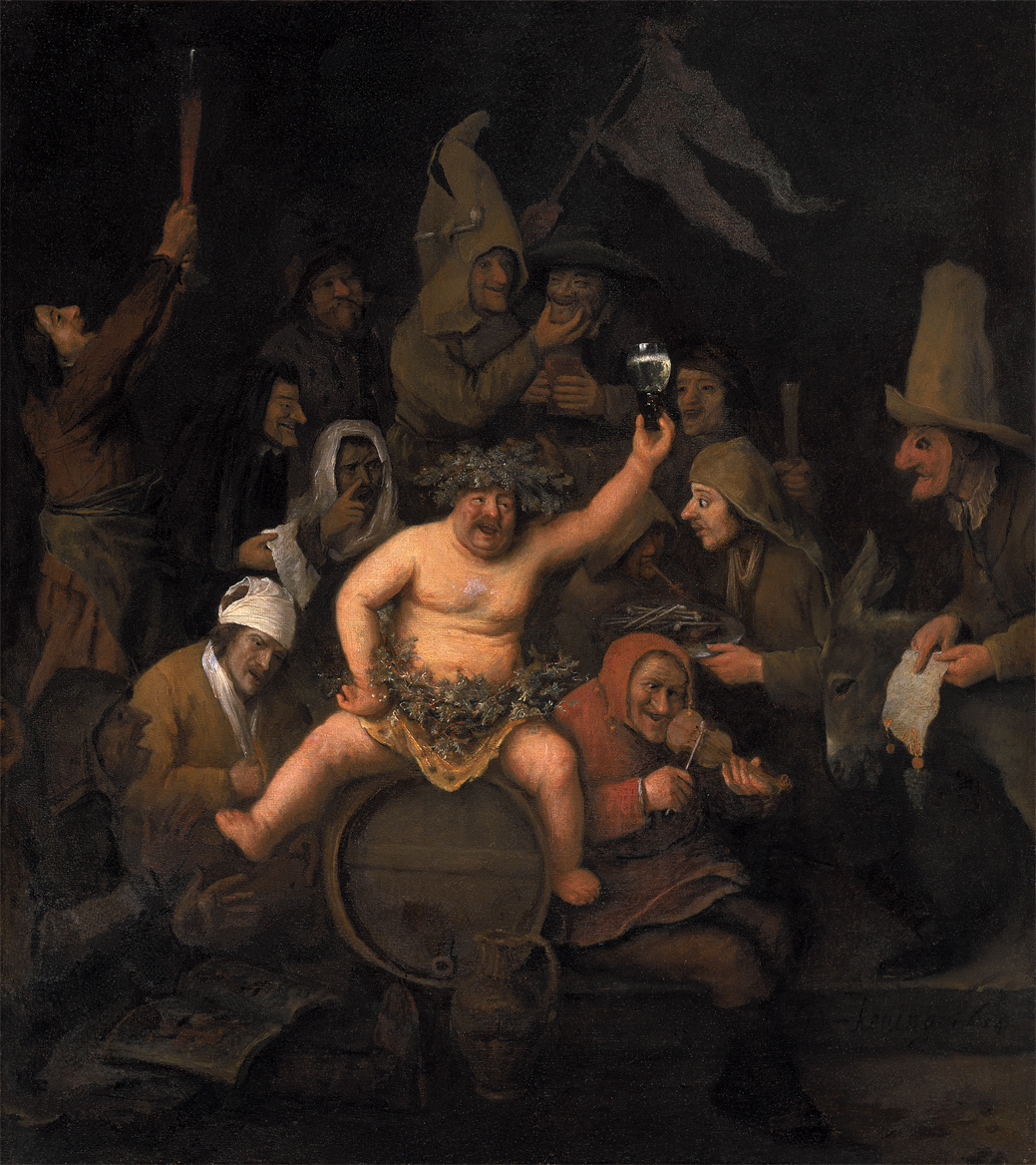
- Artist: Philips Koninck
- Year: 1654
- Medium: oil on canvas
- Dimensions: 71 cm × 63 cm (28 in × 25 in)
- Location: Museum Bredius; The Hague

The Feast of Bacchus (Dutch: Bacchusfeest) is an oil-on-canvas painting that was completed in 1654 by the Dutch painter Philips Koninck. The painting is on display at the Museum Bredius in The Hague. Once thought to be an allegory of the five senses, it may depict a festival held by the Amsterdam Guild of Saint Luke, a celebration of the Bentvueghels, or a meeting of the Chamber of Rhetoric.

== History ==
The painting is by the mid-17th-century Dutch painter, Philips Koninck, who worked in Amsterdam and is known for his landscapes and portraits. He may have been a student of Rembrandt. Koninck signed and dated the painting "P. Koning: 1654". It was painted for Jacob Faes (1621–1661), a wealthy Amsterdam merchant. The Dutch poet Joost van den Vondel wrote a short poem, "On the Triumph of Bacchus, for Jacob Faes by Philips Koninck", about it in 1654. The painting was sold at auction in 1783. It was later acquired by the art collector Abraham Bredius, who gave it to the Museum Bredius in 1925.

== Description ==
Highlighted in the center of the painting is a burly, shirtless man sitting on a wine barrel. He is holding a glass high in the air and is adorned with grape vines, an allusion to Bacchus, the Roman god of wine. There are thirteen people surrounding him. On the right, a person is playing music, while another wears a high hat and stands next to a donkey. Another has a Dutch white clay tobacco pipe in his high hat. The painting shows them celebrating, as if at a Bacchanalia.

It has been thought to represent the five senses. In the 1928 Museum Bredius catalog by F. Julius Oppenheim, it was listed as Honor to Bacchus: An Allegory of the Five Senses. However, art historian Horst Gerson wrote that the painting more likely depicted an Amsterdam Guild of Saint Luke festival. He noted that Koninck attended the festival on October 21, 1654. Gerson also described the painting as resembling the work of the Dutch artist Jan Steen and even Hieronymus Bosch. Art historian Willem R. Juynboll thought that the painting possibly depicted a celebration of the Bentvueghels, a society of Dutch and Flemish artists living in Rome. It may also depict a Chamber of Rhetoric meeting, similar to several paintings by Steen or one attributed to Hendrik Gerritsz Pot, which showed a dispute among the "poets of Bacchus".

== Legacy ==
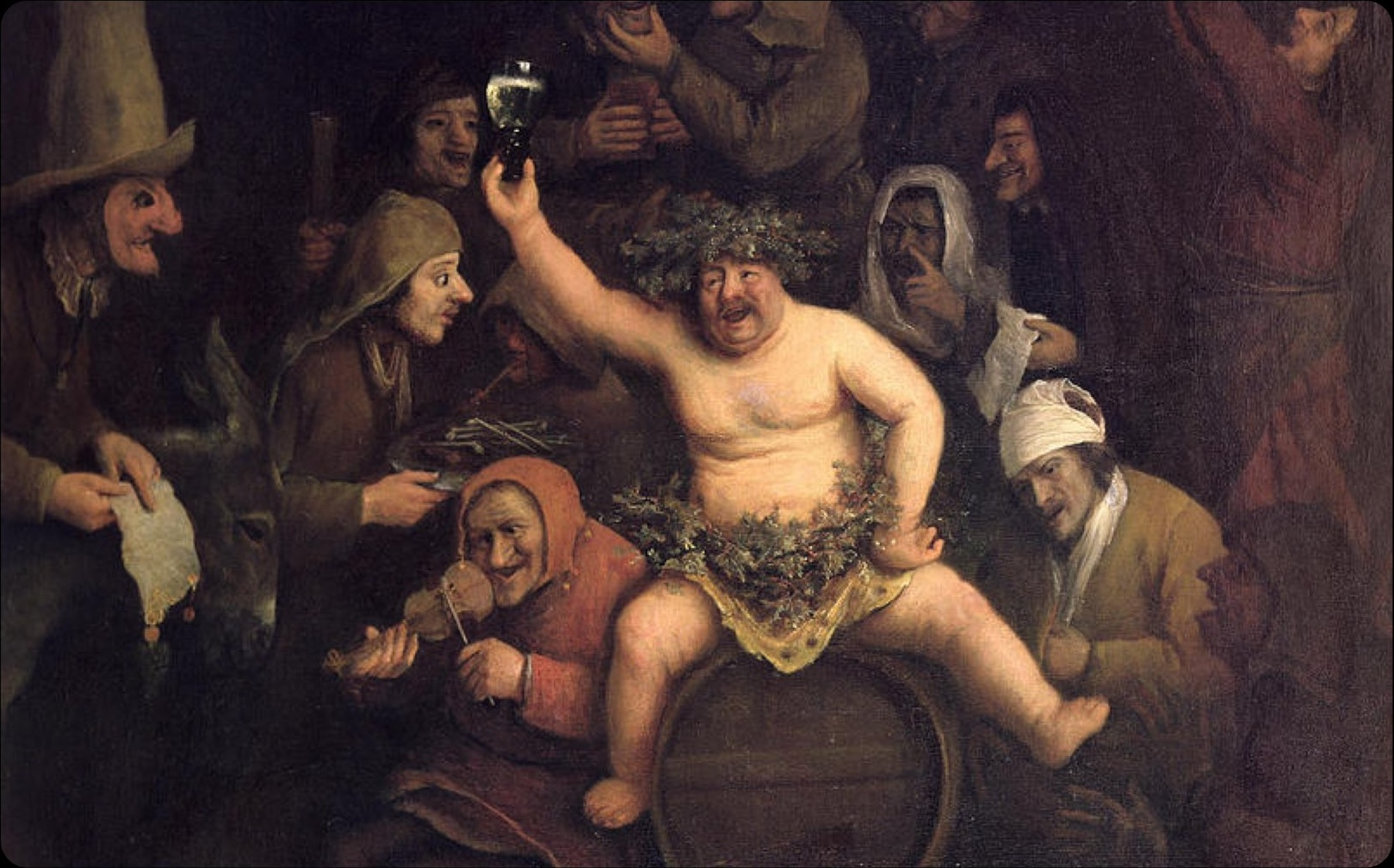
The Feast of Bacchus, posted version

The painting went viral after the NFL Divisional playoff game played between the Kansas City Chiefs and the Buffalo Bills on January 21, 2024. The National Football League contacted LJ Rader of ArtButMakeItSports to see if a photo of Jason Kelce celebrating a touchdown by his brother Travis Kelce could be paired with an appropriate art work. Rader posted a photo by Kathryn Riley with a cropped mirrored version of the painting, a pairing of shirtless celebrations. It has been viewed over 8 million times.

== See also ==
- 1654 in art
- Feast of the Gods – art subject
- The Triumph of Bacchus – by the Spanish painter Diego Velázquez in 1629

== Bibliography ==
- Blankert, Albert (1978). Museum Bredius: Catalogus van de schilderijen en tekeningen [Catalog of paintings and drawings] (in Dutch). The Hague: Museum Bredius.
- Gerson, Horst (1980) [1st ed. 1936]. Philips Koninck: ein Beitrag zur Erforschung der holländischen Malerei des XVII. Jahrhunderts (in German) (2nd ed.). Berlin: Gebr. Mann. ISBN 978-3-7861-1284-6.
