= De Coninck =

De Coninck (Old Dutch spelling variant of "the king") is a surname, most common in Belgium. It can refer to:

- Albert De Coninck (1915–2006), Belgian communist
- David de Coninck (c. 1644 – c. 1703), Flemish painter
- François de Coninck (1902 – after 1928), Belgian rower
- Frank De Coninck (1945–2022), Belgian Ambassador to the Holy See
- Frédéric de Coninck (1740–1811), Dutch merchant active in Copenhagen
- Giles de Coninck (1571–1633), Flemish Jesuit theologian
- Herman de Coninck (1944–1997), Flemish poet, essayist, journalist and publisher
- Monica De Coninck (born 1954), Flemish politician
- Patrice de Coninck (1770–1827), Flemish jurist
- Pieter de Coninck (died 1332/3), Flemish leader of the Battle of the Golden Spurs
- Wim De Coninck (born 1959), Belgian footballer

== See also ==
- 12526 de Coninck, a main-belt asteroid
- Deconinck
- De Koninck
- De Koning
