= Philosopher in Meditation =

Painting attributed to Rembrandt

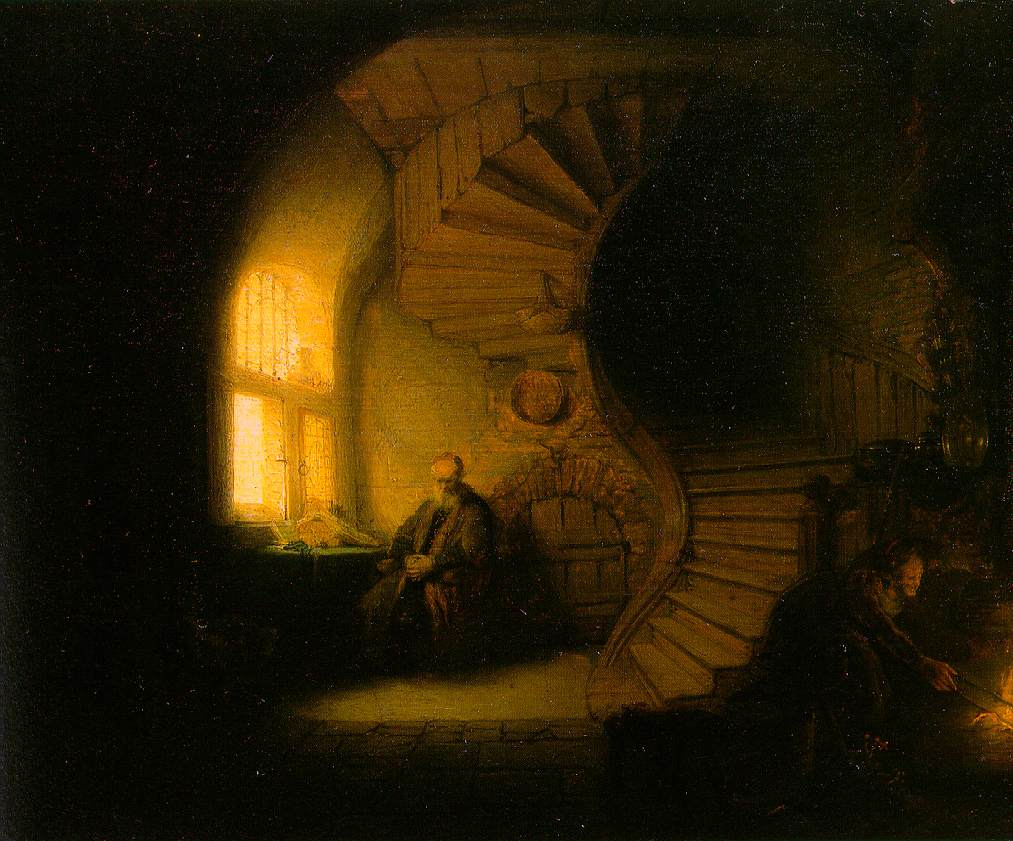
- Philosopher in Meditation (or Interior with Tobit and Anna) by Rembrandt
- Artist: Rembrandt
- Year: 1632
- Movement: Dutch Golden Age painting
- Dimensions: 28 cm × 34 cm (11 in × 13 in)
- Location: Louvre, Paris

Philosopher in Meditation, recently renamed Philosopher in Contemplation by the museum, is the traditional title of an oil painting in the Musée du Louvre, Paris, that is attributed to the 17th-century Dutch artist Rembrandt.

It is signed "RHL-van Rijn" and dated 1632, at the time of Rembrandt's move from Leiden to Amsterdam. Recent scholarship suggests that the painting depicts "Tobit and Anna waiting for their son Tobias" instead. This interpretation is given in an auction catalogue from 1738 (see "Subject matter"), the earliest known source that clearly refers to this painting.

The painting was brought in the middle of the 18th century from The Hague to Paris, where it was associated with another painting ascribed to Rembrandt similar in size, style and motifs; i.e. a small figure in an interior with a spiral staircase (see "Companion piece"). Sold as pendants and identified as "Philosophers", the paintings enjoyed great popularity, making the rounds of major aristocratic collections before being acquired for the royal collections housed in the Louvre Palace. The presumed subject matter of philosophical meditation, the finely graded chiaroscuro treatment and the intricate composition were widely appreciated in France. The painting is mentioned in the writings of many 19th- and 20th-century literary figures, including George Sand, Théophile Gautier, Jules Michelet, Marcel Proust, Paul Valéry, Gaston Bachelard, Paul Claudel, and Aldous Huxley.

The ongoing popularity of the painting may be measured by its presence on the internet, where it is often used as an emblem of philosophy, or interpreted along esoteric or occult lines.

== Description ==
Painted in oils on an oak panel measuring about 11 x 13 in. (28 x 34 cm), the painting depicts in slightly accelerated perspective two figures in a partially vaulted interior that is dominated by a wooden spiral staircase. The architecture includes stone, brick and wood, with arched elements (window, vault, doors) that create an impression of monumentality. On the pre-iconographic level, this is one of the most "graphic" works painted by Rembrandt, in the sense that it contains many straight, curved, circular, and radiating lines: from the lines of the flagstones to those of the window, the bricks, the wainscotting, and of course the staircase. As in the staircase and the basketwork tray at the center of the composition, the curved lines can be said to organize the straight lines. The most conspicuous figure is that of an old man seated at a table in front of a window, his head bowed and his hands folded in his lap. The second figure is that of an old woman tending a fire in an open hearth. A third figure—a woman standing in the stairs carrying a basket and turned to the spectator—is visible in 18th- and 19th-century engraved reproductions of the painting, but virtually invisible in the painting's present state. As it is, the overall lighting is warm and quite subdued owing to the yellowing of the varnish.

== Signature ==
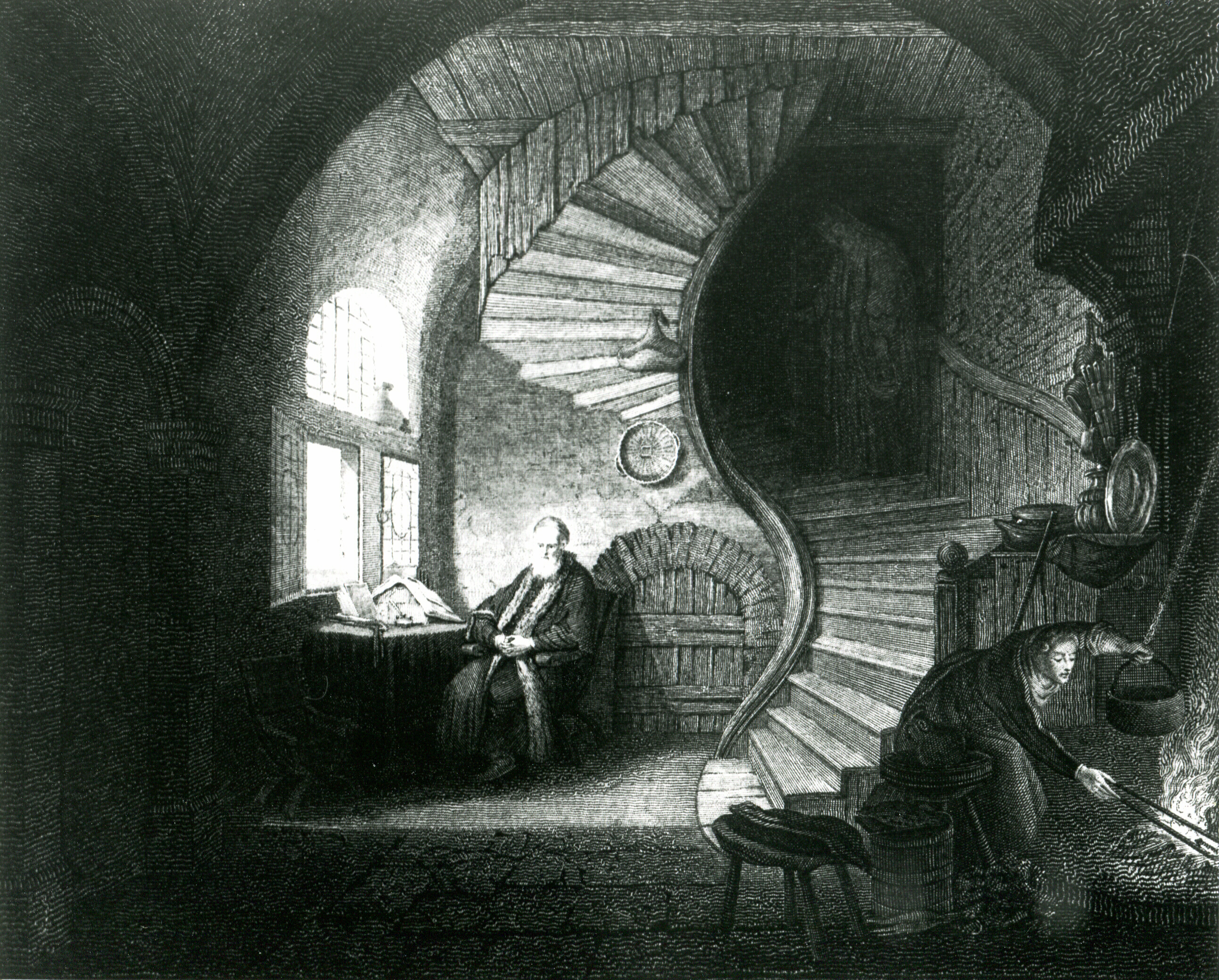
Engraved reproduction by Devilliers l'aîné after Rembrandt's Philosopher in Meditation (1814)

The panel is signed "RHL-van Rijn 163_" at the bottom and left of the center, at a vertical from the figure of the old man. The signature was traced with a fine brush in light pigment on a dark background and is quite difficult to make out. The last digit is a tiny blob of paint, the form and placing of which would tally with a "0", "1" or "2." The type of signature—monogram plus patronymic—would argue for 1632, since the artist is known to have used this type of signature only in that year. This does not mean that the picture was painted in that year or even in Amsterdam, to which Rembrandt had moved in late 1631. In any case, this type of signature is so rare in Rembrandt's oeuvre and date-specific that it argues for authenticity.

== Provenance ==
Close consideration of the known provenance explains how a Dutch scene of biblical domesticity could be turned into a French image of philosophical meditation. In this process, the role of the supposed companion piece (see below), with which it was paired for two centuries and which was also attributed to Rembrandt, proved determinant. Summary mentions of a "Winding stair with a seated old man" in 17th-century inventories could apply to either painting. The earliest unambiguous reference to the painting is in the catalogue for the sale of the collection of the comte de Fraula in Brussels in 1738. The catalogue gives the measurements of the panel and the description: Een Ordonnantie met Tobias, ende eenen drayenden Trap, door Rimbrant (A Composition with Tobit, and a Winding Stair, by Rembrandt).

The painting was bought by Jacques de Roore, an agent bidding on behalf of Willem Lormier, art collector and dealer in The Hague, whose wax seal is still on the back of the panel. On 27 June 1748, Lormier sold the painting for Dfl. 525 to the French collector Marc-René Voyer, marquis d'Argenson. In his manuscript list of the 17 paintings that he sold to Voyer on that occasion, Lormier referred to it as Oud Mannetje en wenteltrap (Old Man with a winding stair). His disregard of the Tobit subject cited in the Fraula catalogue may be due to the fact that he did not attend the auction personally and that he did not own the catalogue. Voyer appears to be the originator of the old man's philosophical vocation, most likely inspired by the companion piece, which he also owned and which clearly shows a scholar in his study. Today, this former "pendant", titled Philosopher with an open book, is attributed to Salomon Koninck.

As late as 1982, the two paintings were believed to have shared the same provenance as far back as 1734, but this was disproved by the Rembrandt Research Project. Korthals Altes claims that Voyer already owned the Koninck when he acquired the Rembrandt, but cites no evidence. In fact, nothing is known of the earlier provenance of the Koninck, or which of the two paintings he acquired first. Assuming that it was the Rembrandt, Anne Leclair notes that: "At an unknown date, Voyer acquired a second 'Philosopher" that he deemed close enough in style and format to make it a pendant". In notes on his "pendants" set down around 1750, Voyer pointed out that "chance brought them together".

Although he waxed enthusiastic about these prized possessions, calling them "unique", by 1752, he had already sold them to his friend, Claude-Alexandre de Villeneuve, comte de Vence. The latter had the two reproduced for the catalogue of his collection by Louis Surugue with the titles Philosophe en méditation (Koninck) and Philosophe en contemplation (Rembrandt). Significantly, the engraver reproduced the Koninck picture first and showed it at the Salon of 1753, while he reproduced the Rembrandt in the following year and showed it at the Salon of 1755. This was the beginning of a long series of graphic reproductions, both in France and Great Britain, that spread the fame of the two "Philosophers", while catering to the vogue for pendants.

The comte de Vence died in 1760, stipulating in his testament that Voyer could choose two paintings from his collection. Voyer did not select the two "pendants", but only the Philosophe en contemplation (Rembrandt), thus separating the very pair that he had created and further attesting to the arbirariness of their association. At the sale of the comte de Vence's collection in 1761, the Philosophe en méditation (Koninck) was purchased for 2,999 livres by a relative of the deceased, the marquis de Vence, who turned around and sold it to the duc de Choiseul, then Secretary of State for the Navy and War. Wanting to curry favor with the influential duc de Choiseul, Voyer offered to part with his treasured Rembrandt so that the latter could enjoy possession of both "Philosophers". And so, for another 3,000 livres the two paintings were reunited in 1762, not to be separated again until 1955.

The "Philosophers" continued their brilliant career in Paris, changing hands every few years: Randon de Boisset in 1772 (14,000 livres), Millon d'Ailly in 1777 (10,900 livres), who then sold it to the comte de Vaudreuil. The culmination came when the two pictures were acquired by Alexandre Joseph Paillet for the royal collection of Louis XVI in 1784 (13,000 livres) and given the honors of the Louvre Palace.

== Subject matter ==
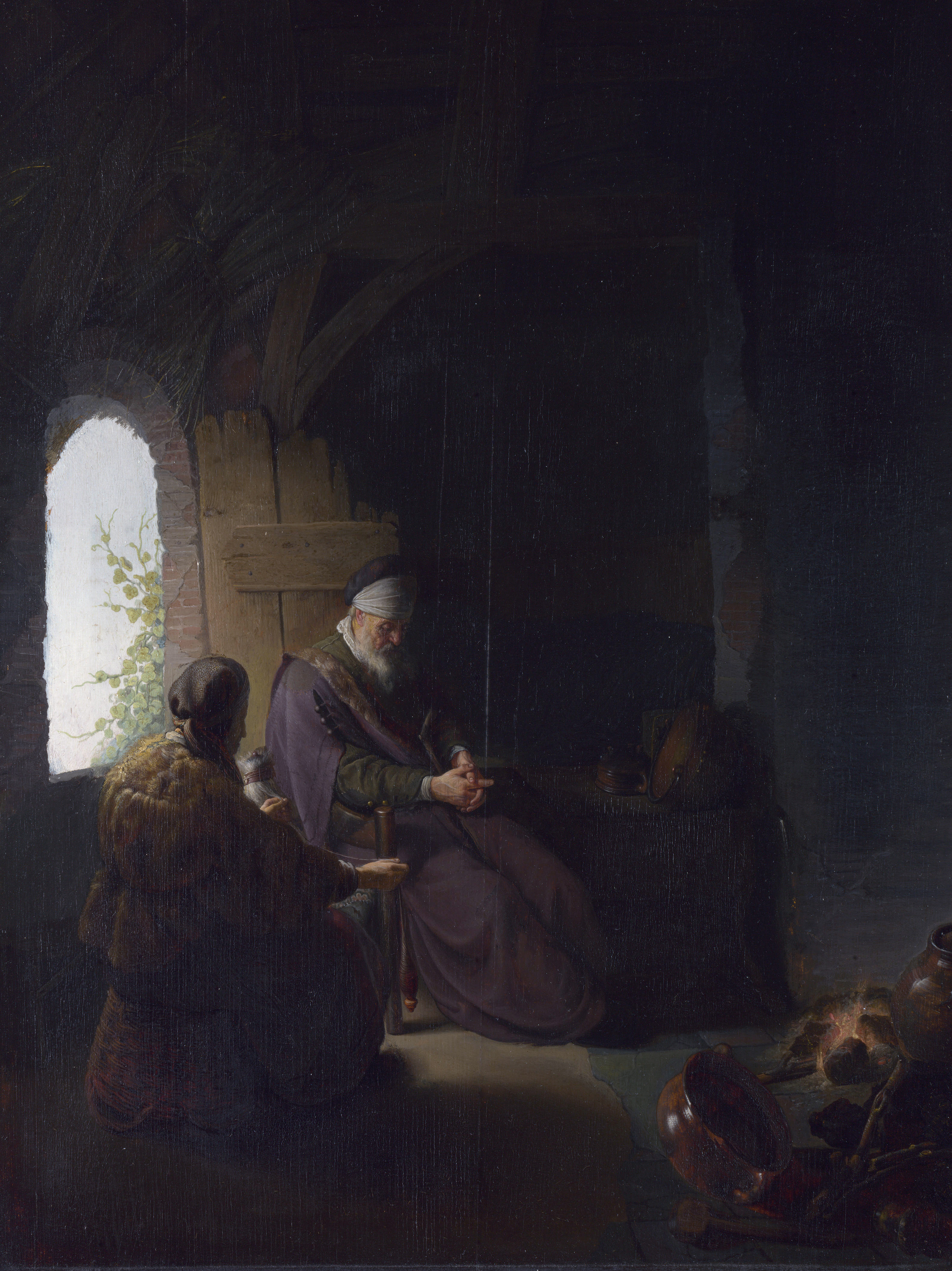
Anna and the Blind Tobit by Rembrandt and Dou (1630)

While the traditional title Philosopher in Meditation has to a large extent been responsible for the painting's popularity, it is iconographically untenable. The painting shows none of the conspicuous attributes of scholarship or philosophy—books, globe, scientific instruments, etc.—and the presence of at least one other figure involved in domestic tasks does not fit in with the solitude associated with study and meditation. Though a large book and a quill seem to be among the few objects on the table in front of the main figure, they are summarily depicted and impossible to identify more precisely: a Bible alone would not suffice to make the figure depicted a scholar or "philosopher". Staircases—whether spiral or not—were not an attribute of philosophy in the early 17th century. Similar observations argue against identifying the main figure as an "alchemist", a subject that would allow for other figures, such as an assistant tending a fire.

The objects depicted suggest a domestic setting, yet the improbable architecture speaks more for a history than a genre subject. The French art historian Jean-Marie Clarke argues that the scene is ultimately derived from the Book of Tobit, one of Rembrandt's favorite Old Testament sources. The sole objection to this interpretation is that, apart from the two main figures—the blind Tobit and his wife Anna— there is no typical iconographic attribute, specifically Anna's spinning wheel. Nevertheless, a plausible interpretation of the scene is Tobit and Anna waiting for the return of their only son, also called Tobias, a scene that Rembrandt had already represented in another version in 1630, in which Anna's spinning gear is minimally indicated. This is supported by an 18th-century source identifying a Rembrandt painting of exactly the same format representing a "Composition with Tobit and a winding stair". The Rembrandt Research Project dismisses this evidence as "certainly incorrect since there are two women in the picture and there is no specific motif from the story of Tobias-"

Earlier inventory mentions of a "winding stair with an old man sitting on a chair" or "winding stair" attributed to Rembrandt are vague and might even refer to the companion painting long attributed to Rembrandt, but now given to Salomon Koninck. Although the title in the Louvre's publications remains Philosophe en méditation catalogues of Rembrandt's painted oeuvre, starting with Bredius (1935) identify the subject more soberly as a "Scholar in an Interior with a Winding Stair". With the rejection of the attribution to Rembrandt by the Rembrandt Research Project in 1986, the title became "Old Man in an interior with a winding staircase".

== Companion piece: Philosopher with an Open Book ==
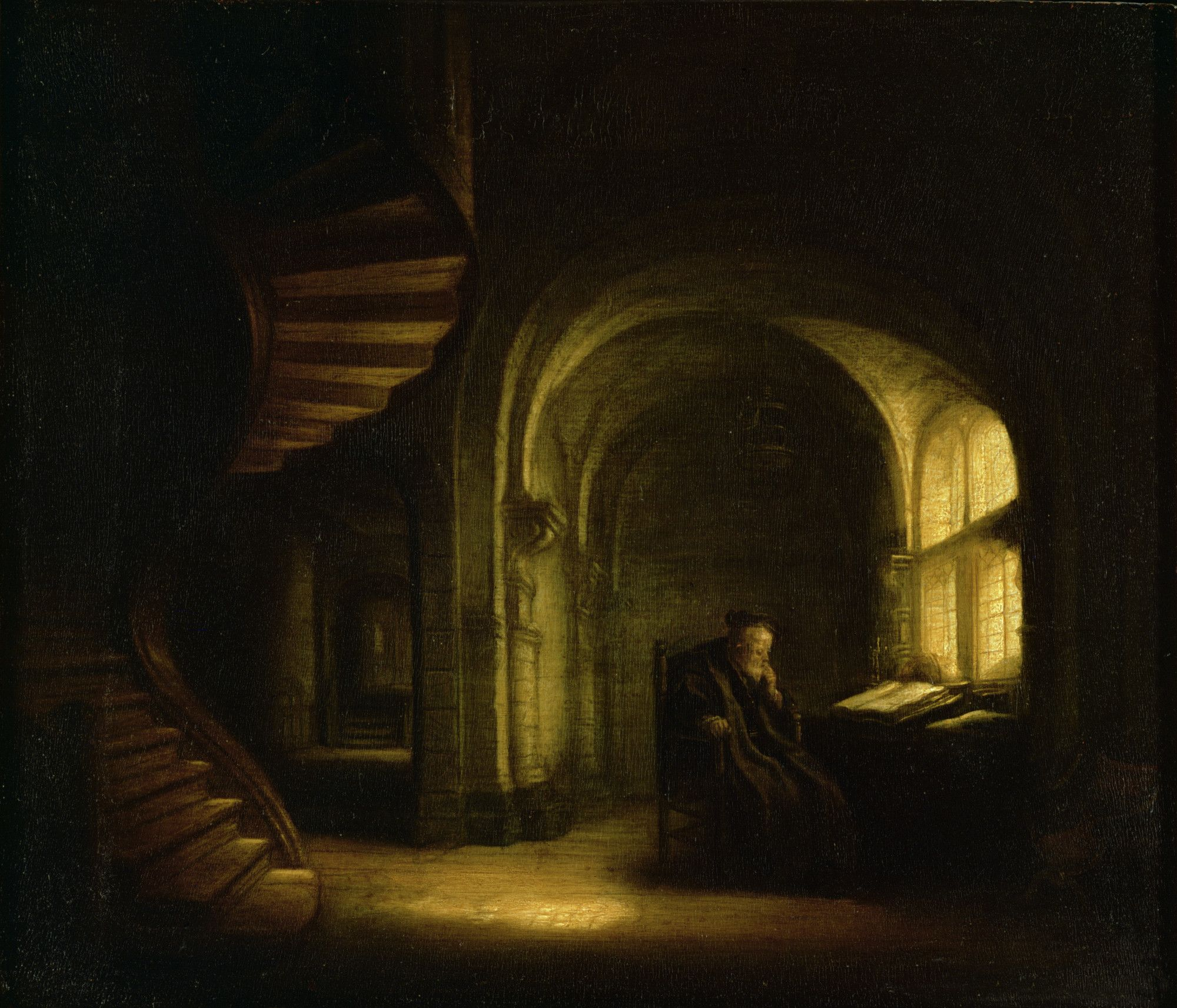
Philosopher with an Open Book by Salomon Koninck

The explanation for the long-standing misinterpretation of the Philosopher in Meditation lies in the fact that, in the second half of the 18th century, it was sold and collected together with a panel of identical size (28 x 33.5 cm) that presented similar motifs—in particular a spiral staircase—and was also attributed to Rembrandt. This painting was originally acquired by Marc-René de Voyer from an unknown source around 1750 and presented as a pendant. Subsequently, the paintings were sold and exhibited together and titled interchangeably Philosophe en méditation or referred to simply as Philosophers. The companion painting shows an old man in a vaulted interior seated in front of a table at a window on which we can see books, a globe, and a crucifix. These accessories and his solitary condition make him a more plausible candidate for philosophical pursuits than the old man in the so-called Philosopher in Meditation, who occupies a space shared by at least one other person, and maybe even two. In spite of the obvious differences in the composition and execution, its attribution to Rembrandt was never called into question. The exception is the American art historian John C. Van Dyke, who whittled Rembrandt's oeuvre down to less than fifty paintings and made short shrift of the Louvre's Philosophers: "Small pictures over which, in the past, there has been much spilling of good printer's ink with no marked results. The pictures are not wonderful...". With that, he attributed the paintings to Salomon Koninck, though one, today's Rembrandt, only tentatively. In 1955, examinations with X-rays and infrared photography at the laboratory of the Louvre revealed notable differences in treatment and caused the attribution to Rembrandt finally to be dropped.

Jacques Foucart (1982), Curator for Dutch and Fleming Painting at the Louvre, like Horst Gerson (1968) and Werner Sumowski (1983), attributes this work to Salomon Koninck (1609–1656), a Rembrandt imitator, dating it to around 1645 and titling it Philosopher with an Open Book. The subject matter and details of the Koninck picture seem to have been directly inspired by a Rembrandt etching dated 1642 that represents St. Jerome in a dark chamber (Bartsch 105), which is the only other known work by Rembrandt that features a complete helical staircase. The traditional iconography of the Doctors of the Church and St. Jerome provided the attributes for 17th-century representations of scholars in their study, which included books, a globe, and often a human skull. The identical format might well be a product of chance (standard supply) and it was long believed that the "pendant" had been enlarged by 2 cm at the top, but an examination of the panel by Clarke and Foucart in 1988 revealed that it was of one piece. Any further speculation on the relationship between the two paintings must take into account manuscript notes from around 1750 written by their first French owner, the marquis de Voyer d'Argenson, who states that the two pictures were brought together "by chance". The provenance of the former companion piece previous to the late 1740s remains unknown: a wax seal on the back has not yet been identified.

== Doubts about the subject ==
In 1738, the painting appeared in the catalogue of the Fraula sale in Brussels with the description "Composition with Tobit and a winding stair". In 1748, Willem Lormier, the art dealer who bought it, listed it in his accounts as an "Old man and winding stair". This suggests that the philosophical reading began only when the painting was paired with the pendant acquired by Marc-René de Voyer (see above, "Companion piece"). When the two paintings entered the Royal Collections in 1784, they were listed as "An old man meditating, an old woman tending a fire in a corner of the painting" and "Another old man, its pendant". In 1805, the librarian Simon-Célestin Croze-Magnan wrote: "But, it will be asked, why give this painting the name of Philosopher in contemplation? There is every reason to think that it was not its author who titled it in this way: he would have criticized his own work in doing so. It may be presumed instead that this fine title was awarded to it by catalogue-makers and dealers who believe that they are giving more depth to the works of the masters by decorating them with a pompous and impressive title."

Such lucidity did not resurface until 1929, when another librarian, Clotilde Brière-Misme, commented: "This old man, whose pensive demeanor earned him the name of 'Philosopher,' is meditating on the Holy Bible rather than on a work of metaphysics." Following the lead of Abraham Bredius (1935), in their catalogues of Rembrandt's oeuvre Kurt Bauch (1966) and Horst Gerson (1968) referred to the figure of the old man simply as a "scholar" (Gelehrter). The Tobit interpretation originated in an article by Jean-Marie Clarke from 1980. On dismissing Rembrandt's authorship in 1986 (see below), the Rembrandt Research Project described the painting as a studio exercise in perspective: when it was reattributed in 2010, it was seen rather as a study in interior light. In their catalogue raisonné of 1986, the Tümpels suggested that the picture of this "scholar" could be read as an allegory of Winter (which would not explain the open window).

== Rembrandt Research Project: disattribution and re-attribution ==
In the second volume of its Corpus of Rembrandt Paintings, which covers the years 1631–1634, the Rembrandt Research Project (R.R.P.) rejected the attribution to Rembrandt of the Philosopher in Meditation. Until then, and except for the "heretical" John C. Van Dyke, this attribution had been unanimously accepted by experts and art historians. The R.R.P. did not introduce any new objective or documentary evidence, but based its judgment on an assessment of Rembrandt's "habits", an appraisal of the painting's style, and the difficulty of fitting it within Rembrandt's production in 1632 or the later 1630s. The R.R.P. did not make any guesses as to who the author of this painting might have been, but relegated it to "Rembrandt's immediate circle, or even to his own workshop". This judgment was criticized by Jean-Marie Clarke who maintained the traditional attribution to Rembrandt and pointed out that the R.R.P. might have had a special stake in rejecting this painting, as the following quote suggests: "In the later part of the 18th century the painting enjoyed a great reputation in France as Le Philosophe en contemplation, and it helped to determine the image of Rembrandt's art to an unwarranted extent."

This disattribution was not accepted by the Louvre and other Rembrandt scholars, and the newly configured RRP has changed its stance since then. In the fifth volume of the Corpus (2011), which covers "small history paintings", the painting is classified without further ado as a "re-attribution" by the director of the RRP, Ernst van de Wetering. The painting was officially re-instated in vol. 6 of the Corpus under no. A86 with the title Interior with a window and a winding staircase and the parenthetical information: "a study in Kamerlicht." There is no further mention of the issue of perspective that was highlighted by the Rembrandt Research Project in volume II when it disattributed the painting and called it just that: a study in perspective. Considering the fact that it is supposed to be a study, this painting is executed in great detail (down to individual nails in the woodwork) and bears a signature and date. There is no evidence that "studies" or "interiors" with figures but without a narrative were in demand on the art market. The inconsistencies in the Rembrandt Research Project's position do not lend credence to its argument that, here, Rembrandt was working without reference to iconography.

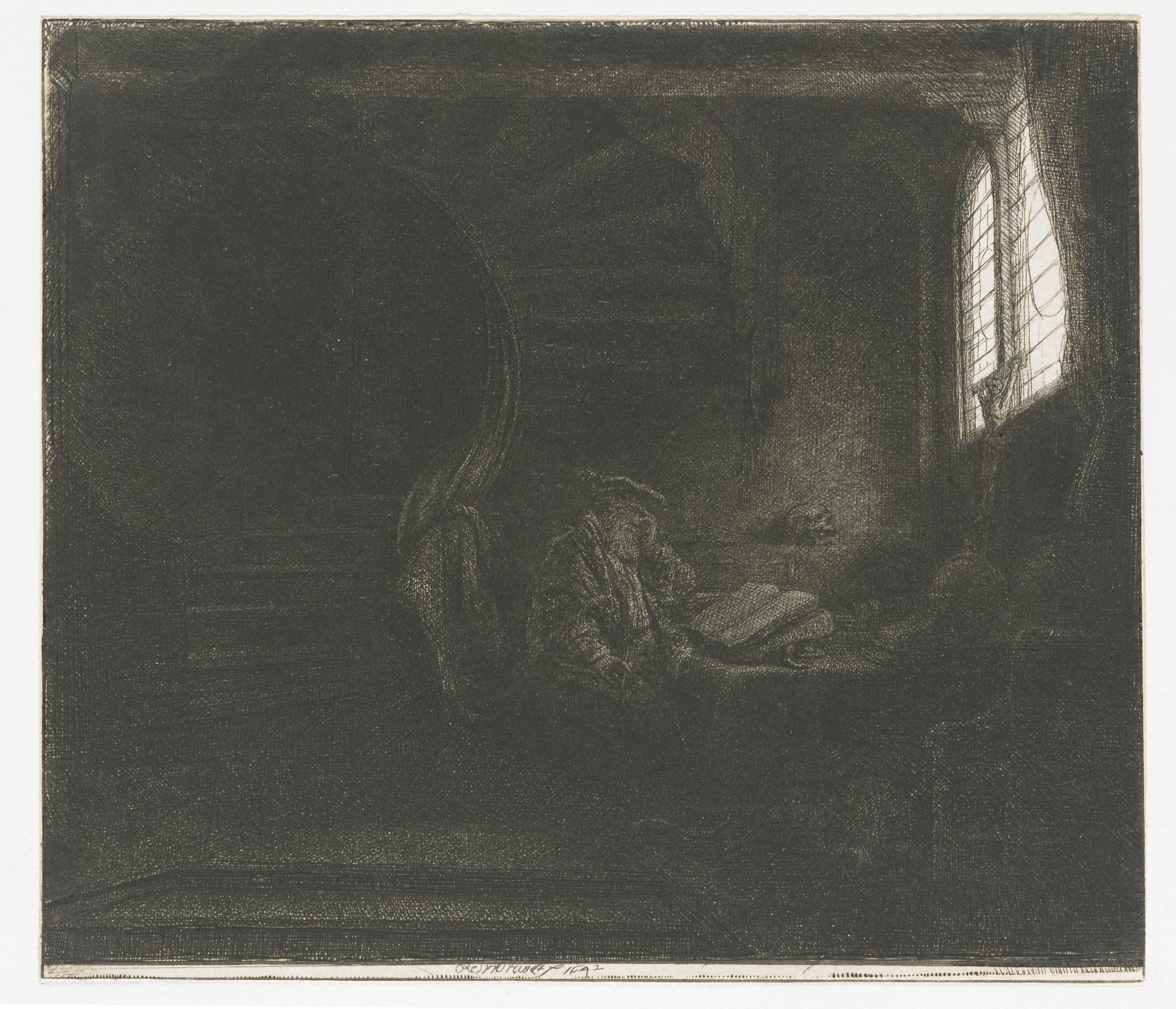
St. Jerome in a Dark Chamber by Rembrandt

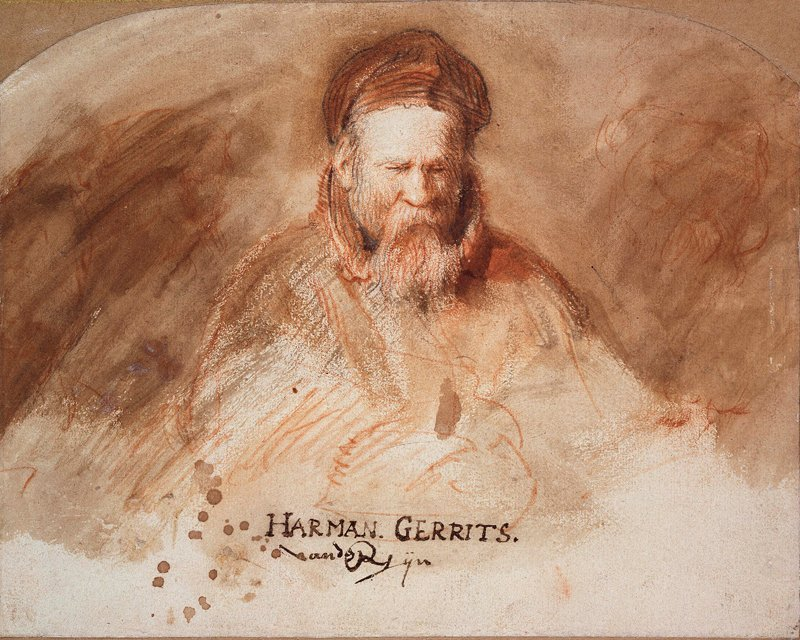
Père de Rembrandt vers 1630

== Esoteric, psychological, and "ocular" interpretations ==
In a lecture given at the Goetheanum in Dornach (1916), the ex-theosophist and founder of the Anthroposophical Society, Rudolf Steiner, described the Louvre Philosopher as the "purest expression of light and dark... All that you see here—the architecture and all the other features—merely provided the occasion for the real work of Art, which lies in the distribution of light and dark." This, he held, was precisely the essence of Rembrandt's art. As it was, he showed only a "lantern slide" of the companion painting by Salomon Koninck discussed above.

With his inversion of the title, Aldous Huxley (1954) sums up most of the "deeper" interpretations of the painting: "There hangs in the Louvre a Méditation du Philosophe, whose symbolical subject-matter is nothing more or less than the human mind, with its teeming darknesses, its moments of intellectual and visionary illuminations, its mysterious staircases winding downwards and upwards into the unknown. The caption to an illustration of the painting (reversed) in the psychoanalyst C. G. Jung's Man and His Symbols (1964) reads: "The inward-looking old man provides an image of Jung's belief that each of us must explore his own unconscious."

Jean-Marie Clarke (1980) advanced a psychological interpretation based on the circular form of the composition and the Yin-Yang-like distribution of light, reading the painting as a Mandala in the Jungian sense: an archetypal symbol of the integrated Self. The chiaroscuro treatment and the presence of many straight lines that are structured by curved lines speaks for an effort at reconciling oppositions. Further, Clarke interpreted the concentricity of the composition and wealth of circular motifs as metaphors for the underlying theme of the painting: the eye and vision. Like Julius Held, Clarke believes that the drawing dated ca. 1630 at the Ashmolean Museum in Oxford (Benesch 64) with the caption "HARMAN GERRITS van der Rhijn" written in Rembrandt's hand that shows his father in a pose similar to that of Tobit here, suggests that he may have been blind at the end of his life. Accordingly, the figure of the blind old man (Tobit) would stand for Rembrandt's father (d. 1630), who opposed his son's wish to become an artist and whose vision the young Rembrandt (Tobias) "healed" with the help of the archangel Raphael ("God heals", a name that can also be considered to symbolize Art). In 2016, Clarke published a theory that relates this and other compositions of the years 1630-33 to developments in the design of his signature in that period; specifically, the sometimes eyelike initial R.

Jean-Pierre Dautun (1983), a student of the French philosopher Raymond Abellio, offered a detailed phenomenological reading along Gnostic lines, interpreting the central motif of the painting (the basketwork tray) as "the navel, the omphalos of the luminous hermetic secret that Rembrandt wishes to transmit: the phenomenological secret that the eye of the genius will be given to those who will conquer the genius of the eye. It is the ineffable secret of this transmission itself, the 'thou art that' of this mutus liber that is his painting, as if to permit an Occidental satori to a koan of his own devise."

The German art historian Karl Clausberg also pointed out the "ocular nature" of the scene and gave it a conceptual framework in his 1999 book Neuronale Kunstgeschichte. In a publication by the Louvre from 2010, Clémence Boulouque reported the following observation: "From a distance, the spiral stairs reminded me of my friend's iris, who did not see the resemblance between her and the little frame. She said that the picture reminded her of the gaze of a scientist in the microscope, the terror of what can done with close-ups, of an eye in a lens, of a man under knowledge."

More recently, as guest curator at the Louvre, the German artist Anselm Kiefer noted in a text explaining his selection of two Rembrandt paintings, the Self-portrait of 1661 and the Philosopher in meditation: "I have always seen these two paintings together, looking at them one after the other when visiting the Louvre. The connection was not due to any motives of content. The meeting of the two paintings happened more on a superficial formal level: the round of the self-portrait's right eyeball portrait[sic] corresponds to the round as a whole in the painting of the philosopher... this round appears like the enlarged eyeball of the self-portrait.

The French philosophy professor Régine Pietra (1992) published an essay in which she used the painting to illustrate the rhetorical figure of hypotyposis; Rembrandt's painting, with its interplay of light and dark, renders the experience of philosophical meditation visually perceptible. The Dutch philosopher Otto B. Wiersma (1999) published an article on the internet that he summarizes in these terms: "The painting of Rembrandt Philosophe en méditation (1632, Louvre Paris) can be characterized as a pictorial meditation on the miracle of vision. A better title would be Méditation visionnaire, because the painting catches the eye in more than one sense."

== See also ==
- List of paintings by Rembrandt
