= Andries Vermeulen =

Dutch painter

- Born: 23 March 1763; Dordrecht
- Died: 6 July 1814 (aged 51); Amsterdam

Andries Vermeulen (1763–1814) was a Dutch painter.

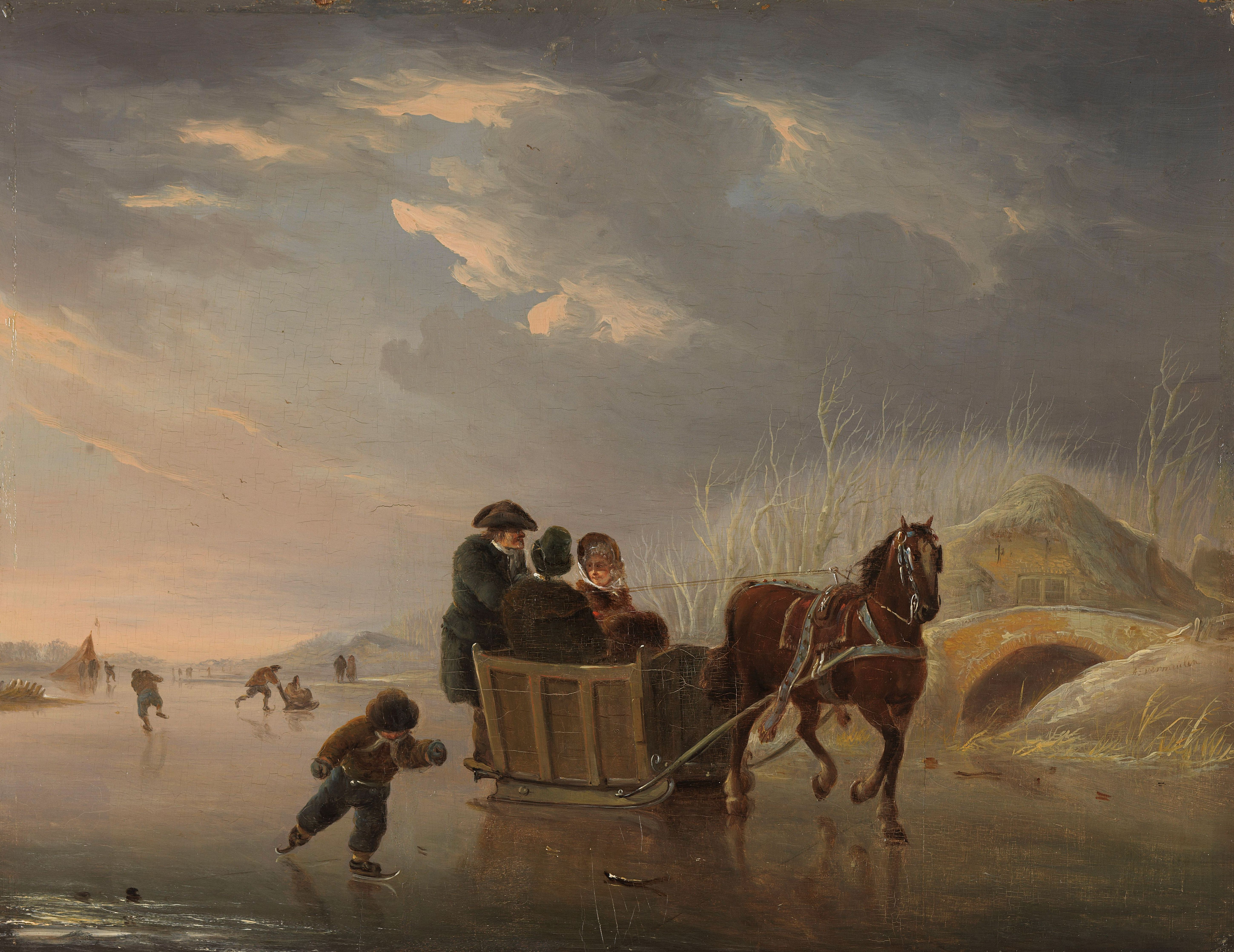
Ice-sledding

Vermeulen was born in Dordrecht. He was taught by his father, Cornelis Vermeulen. He was primarily a landscape painter. He worked for some time in Amsterdam, where he died. He is known for landscapes and engravings and his pupils were Leendert de Koningh and Arnoldus van Well.
