= David Colijns =

Dutch painter

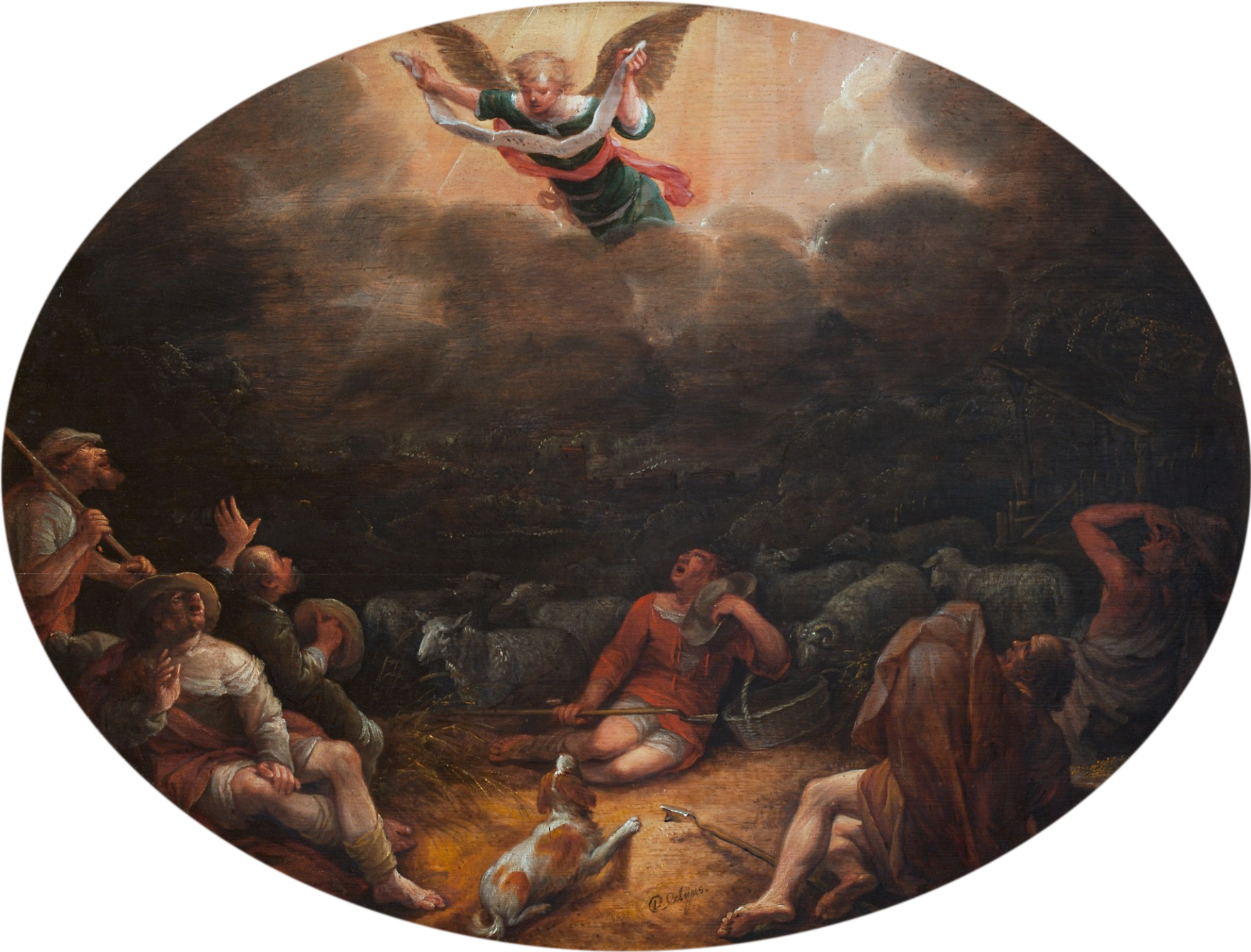
Annunciation to the shepherds (circa 1641)

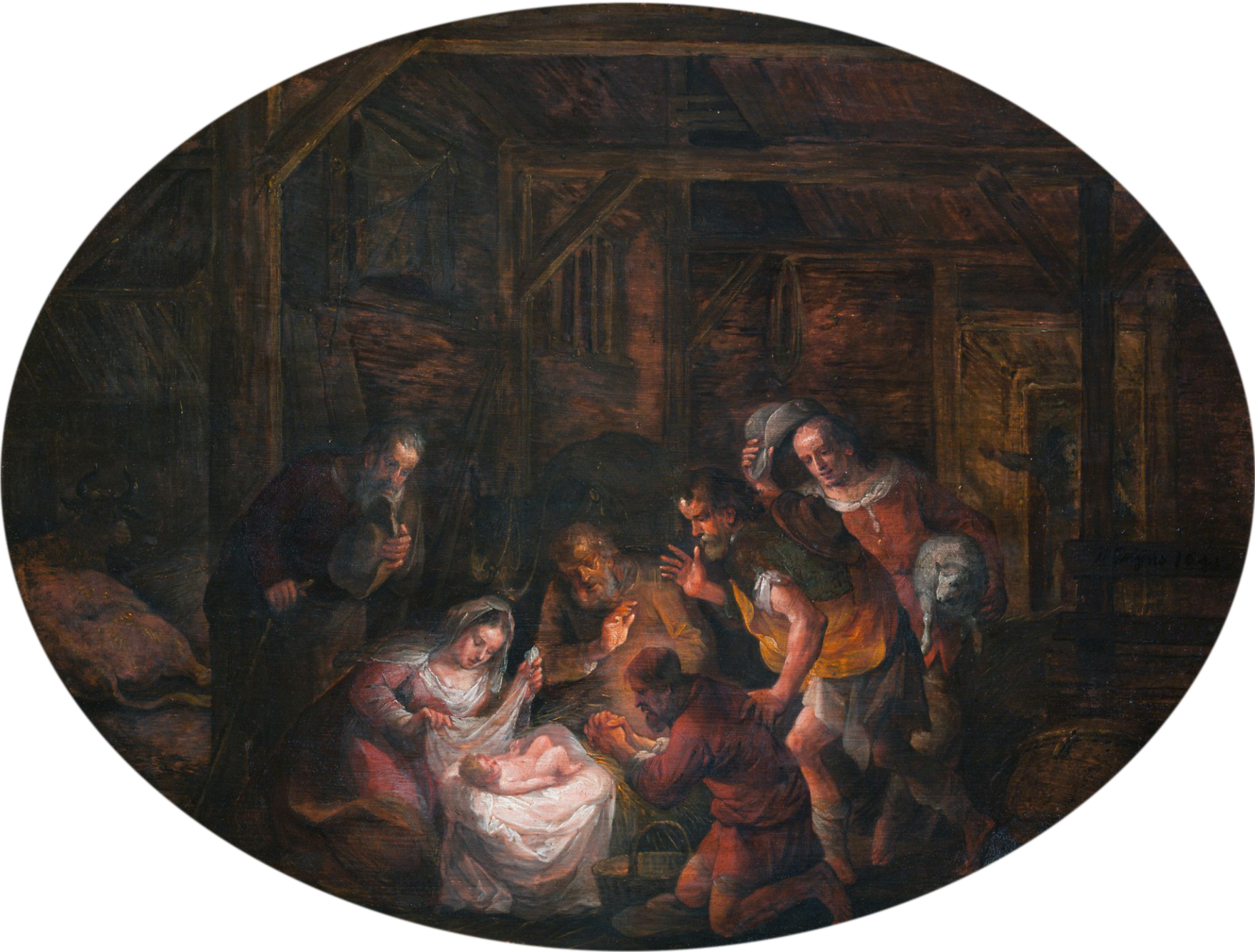
Adoration by the shepherds (1641)

David Colijns (1582 – c.1665) was a Dutch Golden Age painter.

== Biography ==
Colijns was born in Rotterdam. According to Houbraken he painted historical allegories from the bible, especially with a great many figures.

According to the RKD he was the son of Chrispiaen Colijn and in 1621 he became the teacher of Salomon Koninck, and later of Jacob Koninck (ca. 1615-ca.1695). Several religious paintings by his hand hang in the Centraal Museum. He died in Amsterdam.
