= Elisabeth Johanna Koning =

Dutch painter (1816–1887)

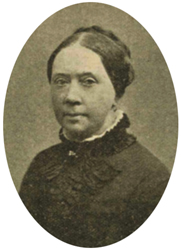
- Born: 1 March 1816; Haarlem, Netherlands
- Died: 25 June 1887 (aged 71); Rotterdam, Netherlands
- Known for: Painting
- Spouse: Sybrand Stapert (m. 1859)

Elisabeth Johanna Koning (1 March 1816 – 25 June 1887) was a Dutch still life painter.

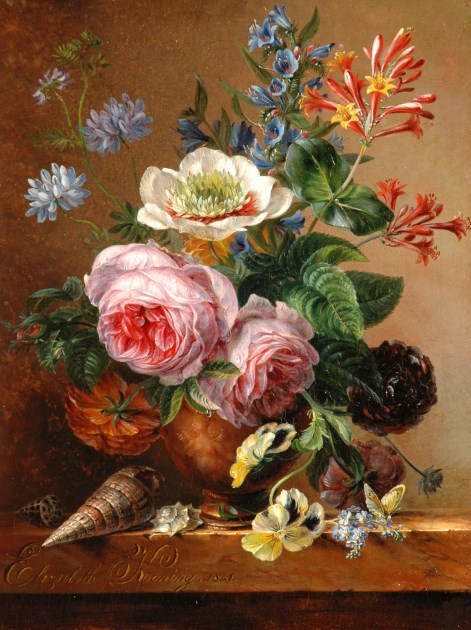
Flower still life, 1841

== Biography ==
Koning was born in Haarlem in 1816 to Leendert Koning and Elisabeth Johanna Deyssenroth. She was born with a right arm that was not fully developed, and because of this, could only work with her left hand. Regardless, as a child she took drawing lessons from her father and was later a pupil of artists such as Henriette Ronner-Knip, Maria Geertruida Barbiers, and Albert Steenbergen.

At the age of nine, Koning was honored by having her drawings exhibited at the 1825 Tentoonstelling Nationale Nijverheid (National Industrial show) in Haarlem. At the age of sixteen, Koning was commissioned by florist Van Eeden to draw the flowers in his greenhouse. She was later commissioned to do the same by Amsterdam banker Adriaan Van der Hoop at his residence in Spaanberg. In 1844, she was made honorary member of Kunst zij ons doel (Haarlem Drawing Society) and a year later she was named member of the Koninklijke Academie van Beeldende Kunsten in Amsterdam (Royal Academy of Art).

In 1859, Koning married the ship captain Sijbrand Stapert and accompanied him to Java, Indonesia. During this trip, Koning was inspired by the local flora and fauna and painted many detailed, colorful watercolors. She was subsequently appointed as the first female member of the Natural History Society of the Dutch East Indies.

Koning and her husband returned to the Netherlands later that year and settled in Groningen. She was primarily occupied with raising Stapert's three children from his previous marriage, as well as their daughter Cornelia, who was born in 1860. She was also a member of the board of one of the artists' society in Groningen and helped organize exhibitions. The family moved to Rotterdam in 1874, where Koning continued to paint, even up until her death in 1887.

== Legacy ==
Koning's collection of botanical drawings is often seen as her most important work. This collection, along with other works, were exhibited at the Academy of Visual Arts in Rotterdam in 1919. Koning also had great success with her floral still life paintings and attracted high-profile clients such as King William II of the Netherlands.

After her marriage, Koning signed works "EJS geb. K" (Elisabeth Johanna Stapert, born Koning). However, since she was active in international shows from an early age and married late in life, she is better known under her maiden name.
