= Leendert de Koningh =

Dutch painter

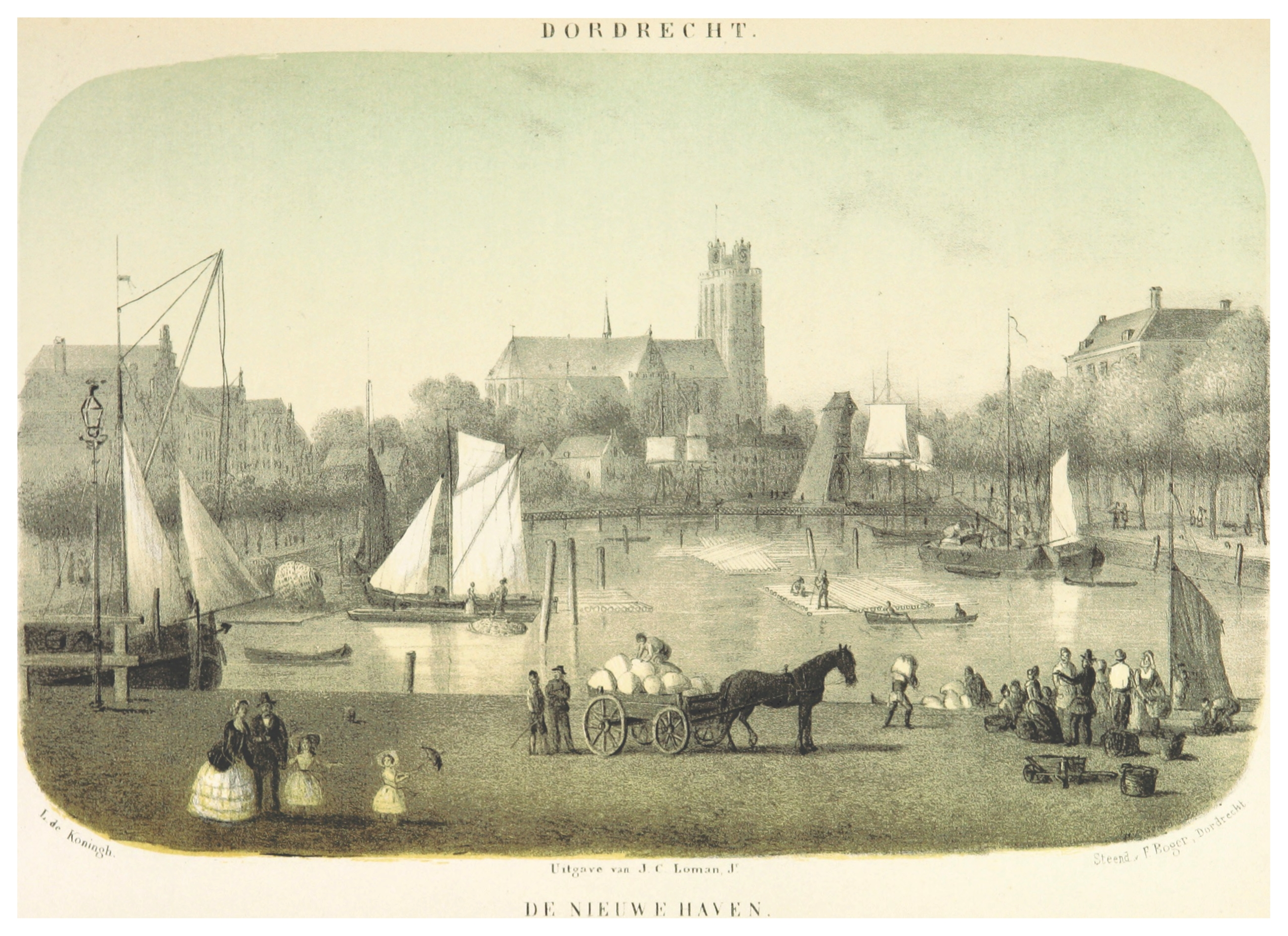
Dortrecht, de Nieuwe Haven - by de Koningh

Leendert de Koningh (12 April 1777 in Dordrecht – 8 June 1849 in Dordrecht), was a Dutch marine and landscape painter.

De Koningh was instructed by A. Vermeulen and M. Versteeg, and in 1801 came to England. In 1803 he was compelled to leave that country during the War of the Third Coalition. He then studied under David in Paris, and through Germany returned to his hometown where he spent the rest of his life, although in 1816 he paid a second visit to England.
