= Martine Wittop Koning =

Dutch nutrition writer

- Born: 10 January 1870; Goch
- Died: 29 July 1963 (aged 93); Huizen
- Occupation: Nutritionist

Martine Diederik Wittop Koning (10 January 1870 – 29 July 1963) was a Dutch nutritionist, vegetarianism activist and cookbook writer. She was a pioneer of domestic science in the Netherlands.

== Biography ==
Martine Konging was born in Goch to Dirk Arnold Wittop Koning (1845–1909) and Martina Susanna Everdina de Moulin (1846–1928). She moved to Amsterdam with her parents and four younger brothers at age 14. In 1891, she attended Amsterdamsche Huishoudschool, a domestic science school on Amsterdam's Prinsengracht and passed her cooking school teacher exam in 1893. In 1895, she moved with the school to its new building on the Zandpad opposite Vondelpark where she was a resident cooking and nutrition teacher. She authored brochures about domestic science and also gave cooking lectures.

In 1900, she became secretary of the Association of Teachers in Domestic Education. Konging later joined a new cooking school on Gabriël Metsustraat in 1906. She worked as a teacher for the school until her retirement in 1935. In 1928, she moved to a house in Huizen which had been built by her brother, architect Adrianus Rudolphus Wittop Koning (1878–1961). Until her death at the age of 93, she was active and worked in her vegetable garden.

Koning has been described as a pioneer of domestic science in the Netherlands and one of the most prolific cookbook authors in Dutch history.

== Vegetarianism ==
Koning was a follower of strict dietary regulations. She was a teetotaller and became a vegetarian in 1900. The school board ordered Koning to eat her meals separately to students because she was a vegetarian. Koning advocated a meatless diet in her lectures and publications. She was a member of the Dutch Vegetarian Association but had to resign in 1919 as some of her non-vegetarian cookbooks contained meat recipes.

== Selected publications ==
Her most successful was Simple and Calculated Recipes (1901), a cookbook for the bourgeoisie. Her other publications include Big vegetarian cook book (Dutch: Groot vegetarisch kookboek), The vegetarian dinner (Dutch:Het vegetarisch middagmaal), Vegetable salad recipes (Dutch: Rauwkost recepten), Our twelve o'clock lunch hour (Dutch:Ons twaalfuurtje), Food in children's homes (Dutch:Voeding in kindertehuizen) and In search of mushrooms (Dutch: Paddestoelen zoeken).
