= Kooning =

Kooning is a surname. Notable people with the surname include:

- Willem de Kooning (1904–1997), Dutch American artist
- Elaine de Kooning (1918–1989), American artist
