= Jacob Coning =

Dutch-Danish painter (c. 1647–1724)

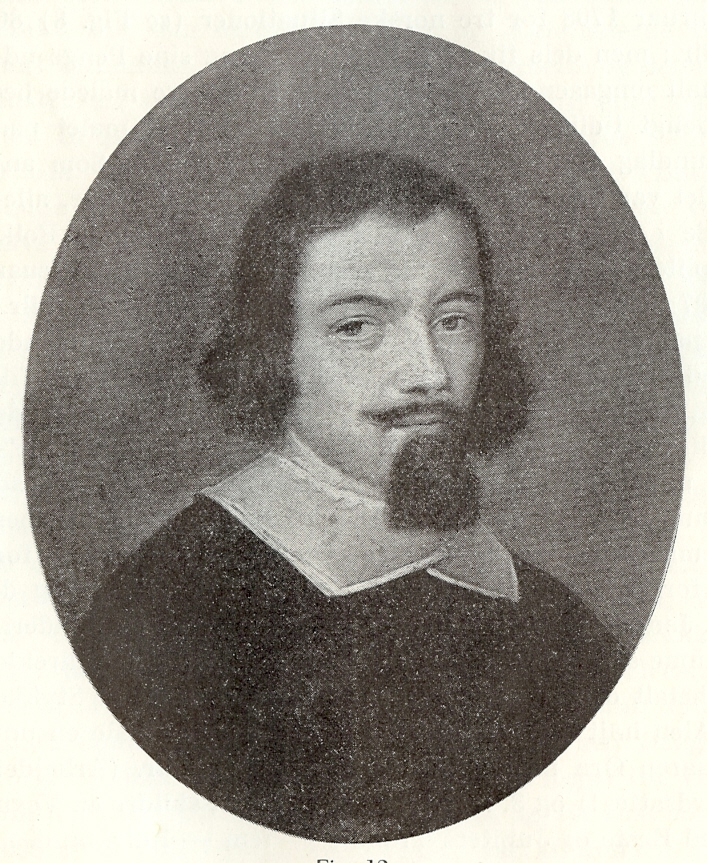
Self-portrait (1699 or 1713)

Jacob Coning or Jacob Koninck II (c. 1647 – 16 July 1724) was a Dutch-Danish painter who was painter to the Danish Court. He was one of the first painters in Denmark-Norway to specialize in topographical painting, continuing the tradition from Dutch landscape painting.

== Biography ==
The son of Dutch painter Jacob Koninck, Jacob Coning was born in The Hague some time around 1647. He trained as a painter under his father and Adriaen van de Velde. In 1676 he travelled to Copenhagen where he settled. From 1680 he worked for the Court. It was possibly his wife, who worked for Queen Charlotte Amalie, who provided the contact to the Court. He mainly made topographical paintings and portraits but also undertook other work such as gilding of frames.

From 1698 to 1699, Coning was in Norway to create topographical paintings for Frederiksberg Palace. Together with a circle of fellow artists, including Thomas Quellinus, Hendrik Krock, Wilchen Riboldt, Otto de Willarts and Georg Saleman, he submitted a proposal to the king for the establishment of an art academy in Copenhagen on 6 October 1701.

In spite of his contact with the Court, Coning suffered from economic difficulties and on several occasions was forced to auction off paintings. He spent his last years in the poorhouse of the Reformed Church in Store Kongensgade.

== Legacy ==
His landscape paintings are renowned significant to cultural and historic value. He was also a portraitist with many customers among the Danish nobility and Norwegian nobility.

== Gallery ==
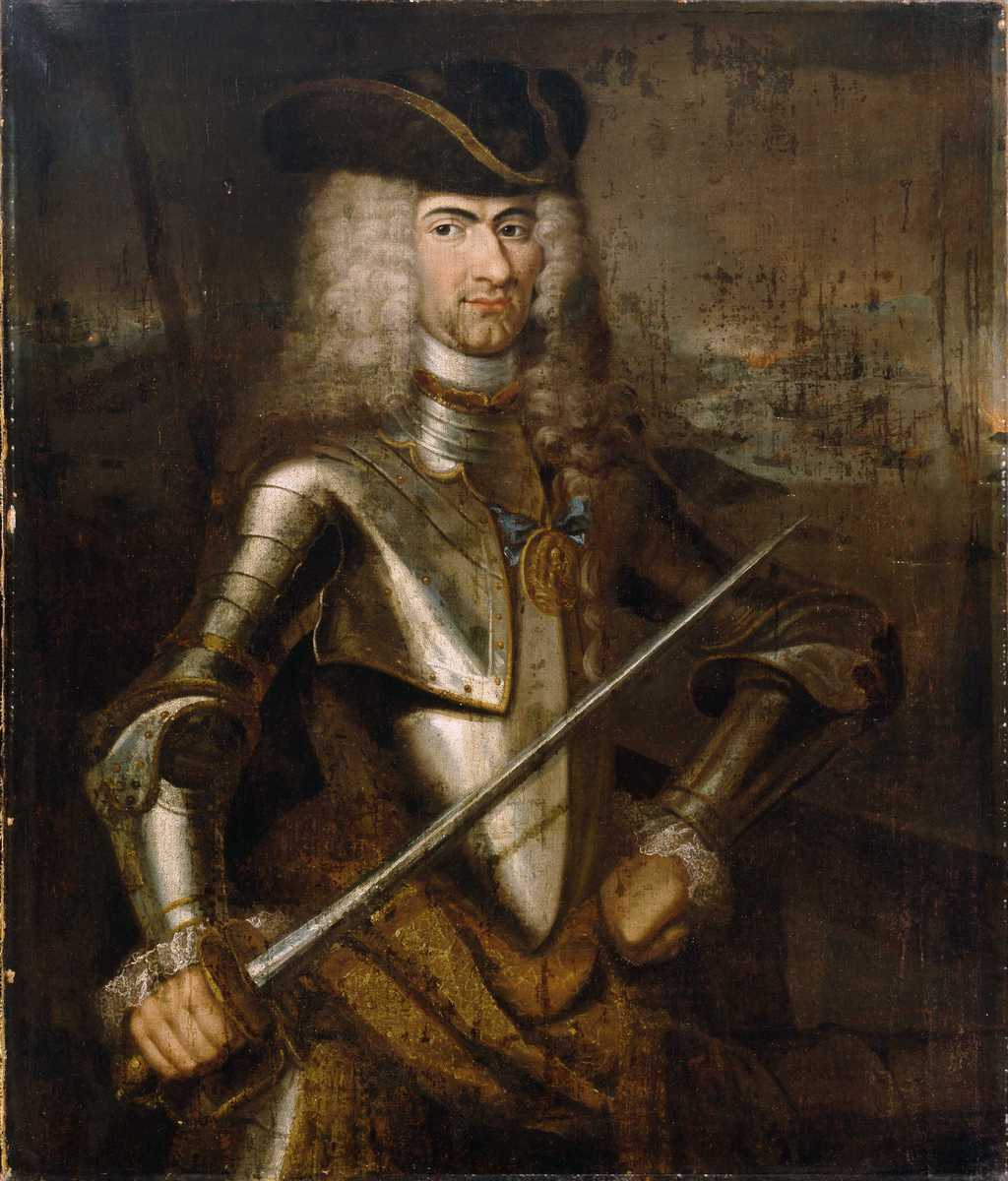
Peter Tordenskjold

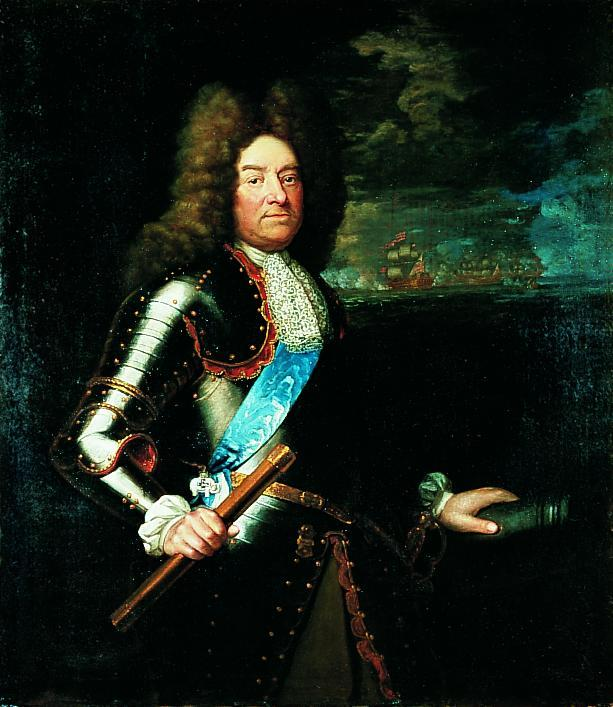
Niels Juel

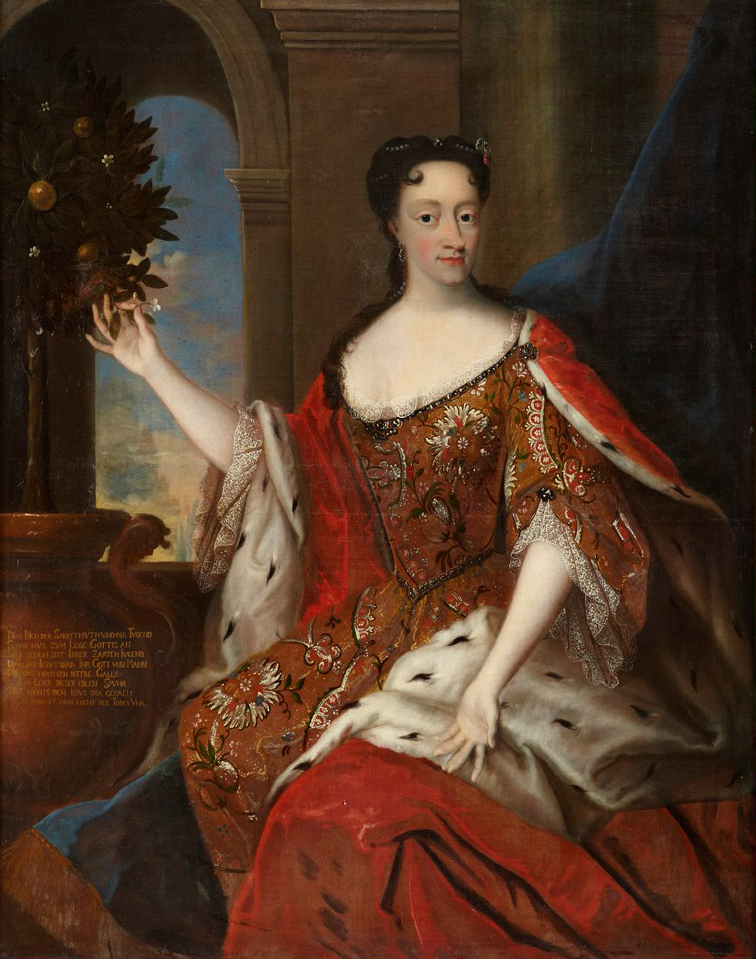
Princess Sophia Hedwig

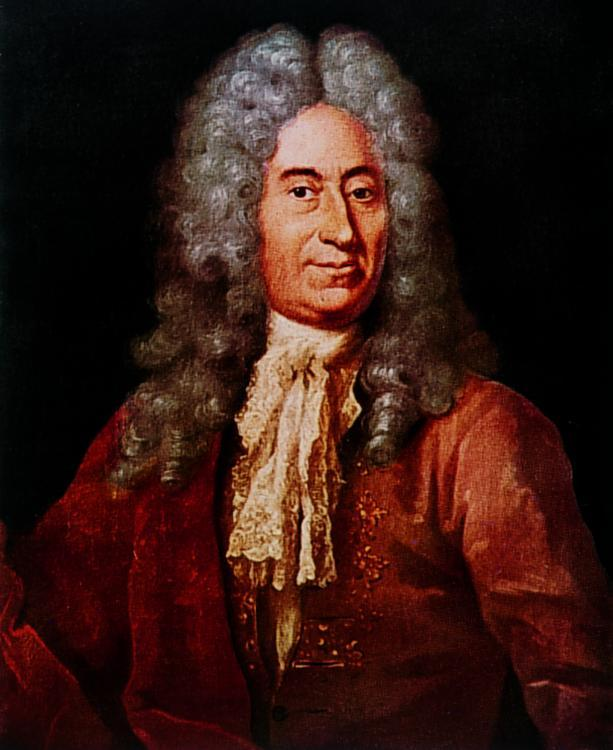
Ole Rømer (c. 1700)
