= Salomon Koninck =

Dutch painter and engraver

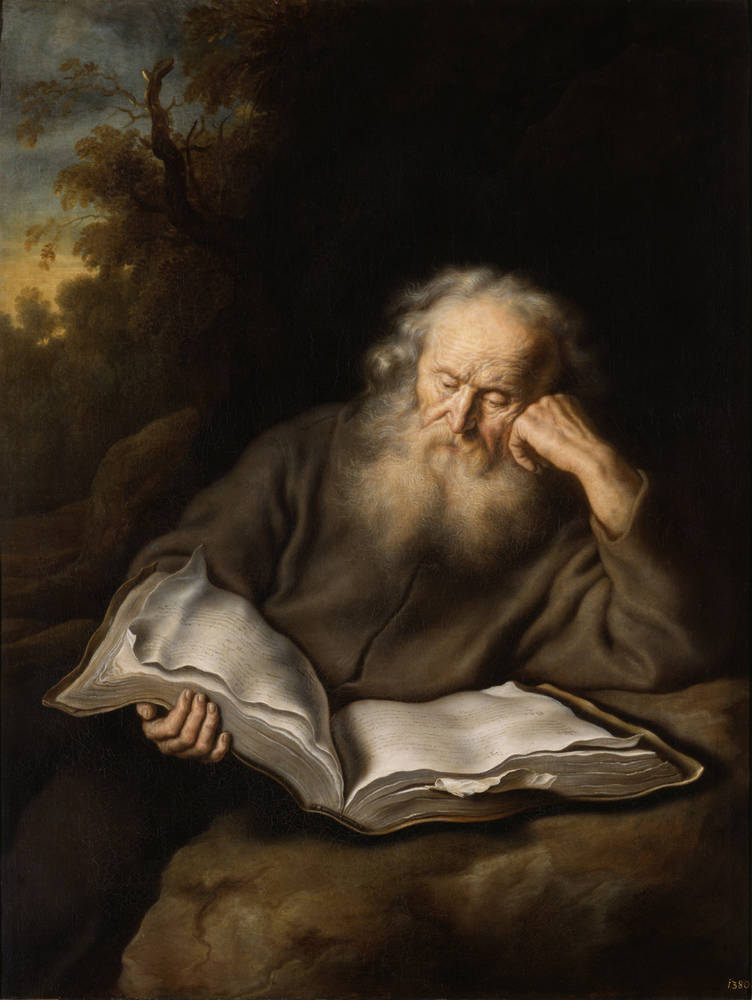
The Hermit by Salomon Koninck

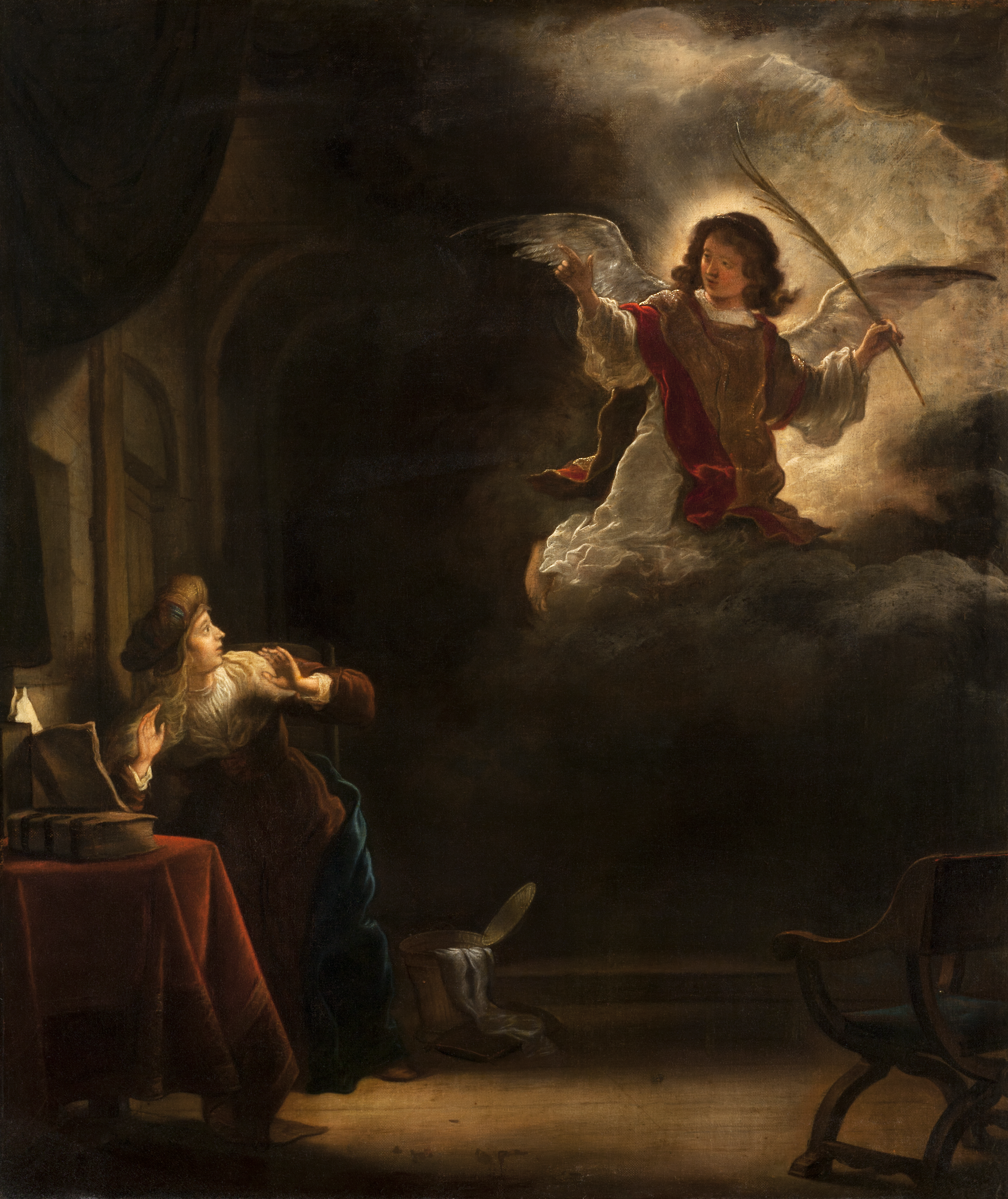
The Annunciation by Salomon Koninck. Oil on canvas,1655. Hallwyl Museum.

Salomon (de) Koninck (1609 – buried 8 August 1656) was a Dutch painter of genre scenes and portraits, and an engraver.

Koninck was born in Amsterdam, the son of a goldsmith, originally from Antwerp, and was a nephew of Philips Koninck. Salomon became a pupil of Pieter Lastman, David Colijns, François Venants and Claes Corneliszoon Moeyaert. From 1630 he was a member of the Sint Lucasgilde. He moved in the circles of Rembrandt and the academy of Hendrick van Uylenburgh, making many copies of Rembrandt's compositions. His paintings have a warm colour palette and include many "philosophers" or scholars. Perhaps one of the better known of these is the Philosopher with an Open Book at the Louvre that was long attributed to Rembrandt and served as companion piece to Rembrandt's Philosopher in Meditation.

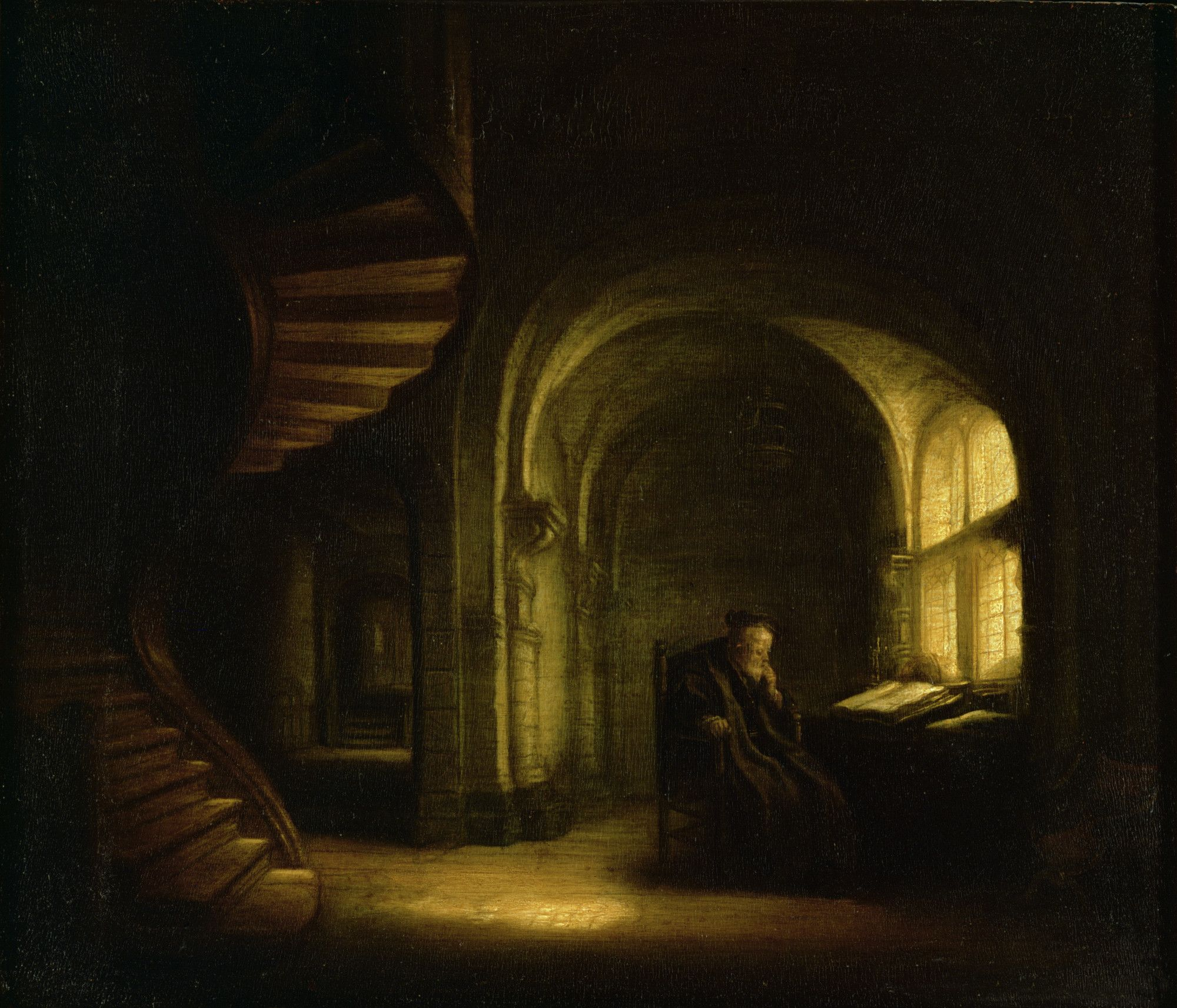
Philosopher with an Open Book by Salomon Koninck

He married a daughter of Adriaen van Nieulandt and later a sister of Antonie van Stralen. He died in Amsterdam in 1656.

In 2019, Koninck's A Scholar Sharpening His Quill (1639) was restituted to the Schloss family from whom it was looted by Nazis.
