= Jacob Koninck =

Dutch landscape painter

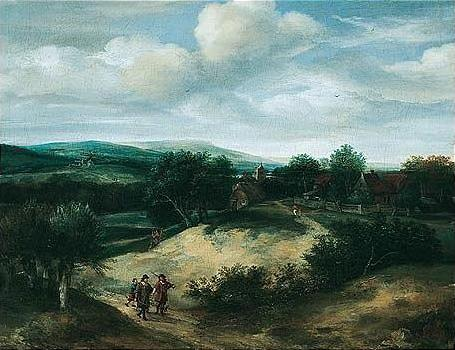
Dune landscape with hunters, 1667

Jacob Koninck (c. 1615 – c. 1695) was a Dutch Golden Age landscape painter.

== Biography ==
Koninck was born in Amsterdam. According to Houbraken he lent his books on perspective to Johannes Verkolje, who became better than he was at perspective drawing. He was a disciple of Adriaen van de Velde who became a popular painter in Copenhagen where he painted for the court of Christian V of Denmark.

According to the RKD he was the uncle of Salomon Koninck, a pupil of David Colijns and became the teacher of his son Jacob II and his younger brother Philips Koninck. He was in Dordrecht from 1633 to 1636, Rotterdam from 1637 to 1645, The Hague from 1647 to 1651, then back in Amsterdam in 1658 (when he probably lent young Verkolje his perspective books).
