= List of national heritage sites in Terneuzen =

75 locations have been designated as national heritage sites in the Dutch municipality of Terneuzen.

== Sites ==
Name	Location	Date designated	Photograph	Notes
Langeweg 9	Axel; 51.2613°N 3.9470°E	5 March 1974		Residential house built in 1896, accompanied by a brick pigsty and by a brick barn from 1707 with a thatched roof.
Nieuwendijk 90	Axel; 51.2747°N 3.9100°E	5 March 1974		Semi-detached house built around the second or third quarter of the 19th century, accompanied by a black-tarred barn from the 18th or 19th century.
4 boundary posts	Overslag; 51.2027°N 3.8929°E	15 July 1981		Four boundary posts with carved coats of arms and writings, denoting "Oostenryk" and "Haar Hoog Mogende".
Hazelarenstraat 39	Koewacht; 51.2372°N 3.9227°E	19 September 1972		Farmhouse, built in 1818 according to an inscription. It has a driveway from the 18th century or the first quarter of the 19th century, and it is accompanied by a little house, a brick stable and three sheds.
Magrette 1	Axel; 51.2872°N 3.8890°E	5 March 1974		Brick residential house built in the 18th or 19th century, accompanied by a wooden barn from around the 18th century with a thatched roof.
Vaartwijk	Axel; 51.2889°N 3.8963°E	5 March 1974		Whitewashed brick residential house, built in 1680 according to the anchor emblem. It is accompanied by a summer house.
Mosselhuisstraat 1	Sas van Gent; 51.2535°N 3.8052°E	5 March 1974		Whitewashed brick residential house, accompanied by a brick car shed with a thatched roof.
Oostkade 31	Sas van Gent; 51.2264°N 3.8023°E	5 March 1974		Classicist building with plastered cornice facades. It is built on a bluestone plinth and a basement, and the ground storey has an arcade-like design in the front.
Westkade 103 and 104	Sas van Gent; 51.2285°N 3.8008°E	5 March 1974		Building with a cross-wing plan, constructed in the first half of the 19th century. It has a plastered cornice facade, and it is built on a natural stone plinth that includes the windows of the semi-basement. The main floor, on top of the rusticated ground floor, has an arcade style and arched windows with iron balcony railings.
Tide mill	Sas van Gent; 51.2296°N 3.7999°E	5 March 1974		Remnants of a former tide mill with masonry, part of old fortifications.
Boundary post	Philippine; 51.2802°N 3.7594°E	11 June 1975		Bluestone boundary post, showing the Austrian coat of arms and the Dutch Republic Lion on opposite sides. It used to mark the border between the Austrian Netherlands and the Dutch Republic.
Graafjansdijk A 83 L1	Westdorpe; 51.2316°N 3.8188°E	5 March 1974		Farmstead with a renovated residential house (not part of the heritage site) and a wooden barn with a thatched roof. Two Austrian bluestone boundary posts from 1612–1621 stand at the entrance of the driveway.
Markt 3	Biervliet; 51.3291°N 3.6879°E	3 July 1974		Residential house with a basement and 12-pane and 16-pane sliding windows.
Burgemeester Maarleveldstraat 5	Biervliet; 51.3291°N 3.6877°E	3 July 1974		Residential house with a wide plastered front facade that has a cornice with mouldings and dentils. It is connected to a neighbouring national heritage site, Burgemeester Maarleveldstraat 7.
Burgemeester Maarleveldstraat 7	Biervliet; 51.3291°N 3.6876°E	3 July 1974		Residential house with a wide plastered front facade that has a cornice with mouldings and dentils. It is connected to a neighbouring national heritage site, Burgemeester Maarleveldstraat 5.
Former town hall	Biervliet; 51.3292°N 3.6874°E	3 July 1974		Building that was the town hall of Biervliet and later served as a pub. It was built on raised ground, and it has a plastered gable that is topped by a ridge turret.
Kerkstraat 11	Biervliet; 51.3296°N 3.6875°E	3 July 1974		Plastered residential house with cross-wing plan. It has 12-pane sliding windows.
Reformed church	Biervliet; 51.3297°N 3.6875°E	3 July 1974		Aisleless church, built in 1659, that is topped by a tented roof with a wooden turret. It has three stained-glass windows.
Markt 5	Biervliet; 51.3289°N 3.6881°E	3 July 1974		Residential house with a straight facade. The roof has been altered.
Markt 13	Biervliet; 51.3296°N 3.6887°E	3 July 1974		Residential house with a straight facade. The front door frame has fluted posts and a transom light.
Molenstraat 5	Biervliet; 51.3299°N 3.6876°E	3 July 1974		Single-storey building with a tiled gable roof.
Windmill	Biervliet; 51.3298°N 3.6867°E	3 July 1974		Round stone windmill without a platform that was built in 1842.
Weinig Rust	Hoek; 51.3025°N 3.7894°E	5 July 1978		Farmhouse with a gable roof and a stone bearing the data 1854. It has a driveway with a cast-iron gate and two barns to the south of the farmhouse. The eastern barn served as a bakehouse, while the other is made of wood and has a half-hip roof.
Windmill	Hoek; 51.3093°N 3.7773°E	5 March 1974		Round stone windmill with a platform that was built in 1856.
Windmill	Spui; 51.2983°N 3.8779°E	5 March 1974		Round stone windmill that was built in 1807.
Aandijkseweg 6	Zaamslag; 51.3354°N 3.9413°E	5 March 1974		Brick farmhouse with tiled gable roof, built in the 17th century.
Molenweg 6	Zaamslag; 51.3223°N 3.8769°E	5 March 1974		Plastered farmhouse with tiled gable roof. It is accompanied by a wooden barn, painted blue-grey open, with a thatched hip roof and an open carriage shed with a tiled gable roof.
Church	Zaamslag; 51.3124°N 3.9133°E	5 March 1974		Church that is a national heritage site because of a 17th-century pulpit and a 1868 organ by Van den Haspel, Scholgens en Van der Weijde. The organ was modified in 1952 by W. van Leeuwen.
Veerstraat 59	Zaamslag; 51.3164°N 3.9363°E	5 March 1974		Brick farmhouse with tiled gable roof, built in the first quarter of the 20th century. It has driveways and hedges.
Kleine Huissenspolderweg 5	Zaamslag; 51.3424°N 3.8949°E	5 March 1974		Partially plastered farmhouse with yellow bricks and tiled gable roof. It has a driveway, and it is accompanied by a wooden barn with a thatched hip roof and a brick carriage shed with a tiled gable roof.
Castle remains	Axel; 51.2637°N 3.9061°E	16 August 1974		Remains of the medieval castle of the Lords of Axel.
Torenberg	Zaamslag; 51.3108°N 3.9158°E	11 October 1973		Motte from the 13th or 14th century.
Windmill	Axel; 51.2679°N 3.9084°E	13 June 1990		Flour mill located on top of a former bastion. It was built in 1750.
Westdam 6	Sas van Gent; 51.2273°N 3.7969°E	15 November 1991		Body of a brick octagonal windmill located on top of the former Generaliteit bastion. It was built in the 2nd quarter of the 19th century.
Tunnel system	Sas van Gent; 51.2271°N 3.7966°E	26 March 1991		Tunnel system from the 17th century, located in the former Generaliteit bastion. It starts 10.5 metres (34 ft) from the western facade of a former windmill with seven radiating passages, having widths of 60 centimetres (24 in) and lengths varying between 6.5–10 metres (21–33 ft). The passages are lined with stone and vaulted.
Church	Zuiddorpe; 51.2353°N 3.9049°E	11 November 1997		Neo-Gothic cross-shaped basilica, built in 1886 and designed by P.J. van Genk. The complex includes eight chapels from 1888, forming a processional corridor, and a churchyard.
Eerste Verkorting 10	Axel; 51.2536°N 3.9317°E	13 October 1999		Farmhouse built around 1895, accompanied by several barns. The complex contains six national heritage sites.
Markt 2	Axel; 51.2653°N 3.9088°E	23 September 1998		A shop premises, built in 1920 in the late transitional architectural style.
Water tower	Axel; 51.2588°N 3.9094°E	11 November 1997		Water tower, built in 1936 in the functional expressionist architectural style.
Stationsstraat 3	Axel; 51.2676°N 3.9069°E	11 November 1997		Residential house, built around 1917 in the transitional architectural style.
Dorpsplein 11	Zuiddorpe; 51.2348°N 3.9040°E	11 November 1997		Residential house, created around 1920 by major conversion of two older buildings. The new facade design uses Art Deco architecture.
Eben Haëzer	Zaamslag; 51.3152°N 3.9508°E	28 October 1997		Farm complex, built in 1868, that consists of a residential house, a large transverse barn, a pigsty and/or sheep pen, and two boundary posts at the entrance from the road.
Zorg en Genot	Terneuzen; 51.3232°N 3.8623°E	26 April 2004		Farm complex, built in 1898, that consists of a residential house, a large transverse barn, a pigsty, and an entrance gate.
Drieweg 1	Zaamslag; 51.3158°N 3.8765°E	28 October 1997		Farm complex consisting of a residential house, a transverse barn with Flemish influences, and a car shed. The house has been dated to around 1900, while the year of construction of 1932 is indicated on the roof of the barn.
Former town hall	Zaamslag; 51.3126°N 3.9131°E	28 October 1997		Former town hall that was constructed around 1904 in the Renaissance Revival style.
Nieuwstraat 4	Terneuzen; 51.3377°N 3.8260°E	28 October 1997		Office building, constructed around 1920 in the Amsterdam School style for a bank.
Nieuwstraat 27	Terneuzen; 51.3388°N 3.8246°E	28 October 1997		Arsenal, built in 1848 for the fortified town of Terneuzen.
