= Zandstra =

Zandstra is a surname. Notable people with the surname include:

- Peter Zandstra (fl. 1999), Canadian scientist
- Falko Zandstra (b. 1971), Dutch speed skater
- Jerry Zandstra (fl. 1991), American religious official

== See also ==
- Zandstraat
