= Spui =

Spui or SPUI may refer to:

- Spui (Amsterdam), a square in the centre of Amsterdam, Netherlands
- Spui (river), in the Netherlands
- Spui (tram station) in The Hague, Netherlands
- Spui, Zeeland, a town in the Netherlands
- Single-point urban interchange, a type of highway interchange
