= City rights in the Low Countries =

Aspect of medieval history

City rights are a feature of the medieval history of the Low Countries, and, more generally, the Holy Roman Empire of the German Nation. A liege lord, usually a count, duke or similar member of the high nobility, granted to a town or village he owned certain town privileges that places without city rights did not have.

In Belgium, Luxembourg, and the Netherlands, a town, often proudly, calls itself a city if it obtained a complete package of city rights at some point in its history. Its current population is not relevant, so there are some very small cities. The smallest is Staverden in the Netherlands, with 40 inhabitants. In Belgium, Durbuy is the smallest city, whilst the smallest in Luxembourg is Vianden.

== Overview ==
When forced by financial problems, feudal landlords offered for sale privileges to settlements from around 1000. The total package of these comprises town privileges.

Such sales raised (non-recurrent) revenue for the feudal lords, in exchange for the loss of power. Over time, the landlords sold more and more privileges. This resulted in a shift of power within the counties and duchies in the Low Countries from the aristocracy to the bourgeoisie, starting in Flanders. Some of these cities even developed into city-states. The growing economic and military power concentrating in the cities led to a very powerful class of well-to-do merchants and traders.

== Common City rights ==
Privileges

- Defensive walls (the right to erect a defence wall around an inhabited area)
- Market right (the right to hold markets and receive income from them)
- Staple right (the right to store and exclusively trade particular goods, often only granted to a few cities)
- Toll right (the right to charge tolls)
- Mint right (the right to mint city coinage)
- Taxation (the right to levy taxes)
- Weighing (the right to organize official weighing: cargo, livestock, produce, building material, trading goods etc.)

Freedoms

- Personal freedom (citizens had a relative degree of personal freedom in comparison to citizens of rural areas: they were not subject to the liege lord and had freedom of mobility) – Hence the old saying "Stadslucht maakt vrij" ('City air makes free').

Governance

- Self-governance (Well-to-do citizens could sometimes elect local government officials)
- Judiciary and law-making (Within its boundaries the city could have a great degree of autonomy)

== Rights granted to the cities of present-day Belgium ==
=== Grants of city rights, alphabetically. ===
- 1174 Aalst
- 1194 Aarschot
- 1166 Ath
- 1221 Antwerp
- 1332 Bastogne
- 1386 Bilzen
- 1386 Bree
- 1128 Bruges
- 1229 Brussels
- 1180 Damme
- 1241 Deinze
- 1233 Dendermonde
- 1229 Diest
- 1244 Dilsen-Stokkem
- 1331 Durbuy
- 1240 Eeklo
- 1178 Ghent
- 1068 Geraardsbergen
- 1206 Halen
- 1225 Halle
- 1153 Harelbeke
- 1209 Herentals
- 1386 Herk de Stad
- 1066 Huy
- 1210 Hoogstraten
- 1174 Ypres
- 1127 Kortrijk
- 1211 Landen
- 1211 Leuven
- 1212 Lier
- 1244 Maaseik
- 1301 Mechelen
- 1163 Nijvel
- 1267 Ostend
- 1189 Oudenaarde
- 1147 Poperinge
- 1250 Roeselare
- 1240 Ronse
- 1594 Spa
- 1245 Tielt
- 1243 Tienen
- 1183 Torhout
- 1212 Turnhout
- 1107 Zoutleeuw

== Rights granted to the cities of present-day Luxembourg ==
=== Modern era ===
Note several of the following were first granted city rights during the medieval period.

- 1843 Diekirch
- 1843 Echternach
- 1843 Grevenmacher
- 1843 Luxembourg City
- 1843 Remich
- 1843 Vianden
- 1843 Wiltz
- 1906 Esch-sur-Alzette
- 1907 Differdange
- 1907 Dudelange
- 1907 Ettelbruck
- 1907 Rumelange
- 1914 Hollerich-Bonnevoie

== Rights granted to the cities of the present-day Netherlands ==
The first community in the contemporary Kingdom of the Netherlands to receive city rights was Deventer in 956. It can be argued that some cities have older rights: for instance Nijmegen may have been granted city status during the Roman Empire. Another case is Voorburg, which is built on the site of the Roman settlement Forum Hadriani and was granted city status in about AD 151, but was abandoned in the late 3rd century: thus the current settlement is not considered an uninterrupted continuation of the Roman city. At the end of the Middle Ages, the number of grants of city status fell dramatically.

The strong position of merchants and traders allowed the Netherlands to become the first modern republic in the 16th century.

=== End of city rights ===
The institution of city status gradually came to an end with the development and centralization of a national government. In the Netherlands the last city to receive real city rights (as defined above) was Willemstad in 1586. During the Dutch Republic, only Blokzijl gained city rights (in 1672). After the Batavian Revolution in 1795, municipalities were styled after the French model and city rights were abolished by law. Although partially restored after 1813, cities did not fully regain the authority they had previously had: law-making and the judiciary had become part of the state. After the Constitution of 1848 and the Municipal Law of 1851, the differences between the legal privileges of cities, towns, and villages were permanently erased.

In the early 19th century, when several important towns (especially The Hague) wanted to call themselves cities, the custom of granting city status was briefly revived. The last grant of city status in the Netherlands was to Delfshaven in 1825. But the city status granted during this period was quite different from the privileges bestowed in the Middle Ages, and were merely symbolic. This is also the case for cities such as The Hague and Assen, which received their status during the Napoleonic period.

=== Grants of city rights, chronologically ===
- 956 Deventer
- 1118 Stavoren
- 1122 Utrecht
- 1127 Aardenburg
- 1180 Hulst
- 1183 Biervliet
- 1185 's-Hertogenbosch (Den Bosch)
- 1190 Zutphen
- 1204 Maastricht
- 1212 Bergen op Zoom
- 1212 Breda
- 1213 Axel
- 1213 Geertruidenberg
- 1217 Middelburg
- 1220 Dordrecht
- 1223 Westkapelle
- 1223 Domburg
- 1230 Nijmegen
- 1230 Oisterwijk
- 1230 Zwolle
- 1231 Harderwijk
- 1231 Roermond
- 1232 Sint Oedenrode
- 1232 Eindhoven
- 1233 Elburg
- 1233 Grave
- 1233 Lochem
- 1233 Arnhem
- 1233 Gendt
- 1234 Harlingen
- 1236 Kampen
- 1237 Doesburg
- 1237 Doetinchem
- 1237 Oostburg
- 1242 Sint Anna ter Muiden
- 1243 Rijssen
- 1243 Sittard
- 1245 Groningen
- 1245 Haarlem
- 1246 Delft
- 1246 's-Gravenzande
- 1248 Ommen
- 1248 Winkel
- 1248 Zierikzee
- 1249 Oldenzaal
- 1252 Hasselt
- 1254 Alkmaar
- 1256 or 1258 Rhenen
- 1259 Amersfoort
- 1260 Vreeland
- 1263 Goor
- 1263 Wageningen
- 1265 Oudewater
- 1266 Leiden
- 1271 Montfort
- 1271 Nieuwstadt
- 1272 Gouda
- 1272 Steenbergen
- 1272 Venlo
- 1273 Vlaardingen
- 1275 Genemuiden
- 1275 Schiedam
- 1276 Susteren
- 1277 Groenlo
- 1280 Schoonhoven
- 1283 Nieuwpoort
- 1285 Leeuwarden
- 1289 Medemblik
- 1290 Sluis
- 1295 Gein
- 1296 Muiden
- 1298 Beverwijk
- 1298 Dokkum
- 1298 Staverden
- 1299 Hattem
- 12?? Tiel
- 1300 Amsterdam
- 1300 Eembrugge
- 1300 Wijk bij Duurstede
- 1300 approx. Naarden
- 1303 IJzendijke
- 1303 Waalwijk
- 1306 Brielle
- 1312 Goedereede
- 1313 Asperen
- 1314 Huissen
- 1315 IJlst
- 1315 Vlissingen
- 1315 Wieringen
- 1315 Zaltbommel
- 1318 Culemborg
- 1318 Heusden
- 1322 Gorinchem
- 1322 Ammerstol
- 1325 Enschede
- 1325 Ootmarsum
- 1327 Appingedam
- 1327 Steenwijk
- 1328 Maasbommel
- 1329 Montfoort
- 1329 Wessem
- 1331 IJsselstein
- 1331 Wilsum
- 1333 Delden
- 1333 Grafhorst
- 1336 Vianen
- 1340 Rotterdam
- 1343 Echt
- 1345 Eemnes-Buiten
- 1346 Helmond
- 1349 Batenburg
- 1354 Vollenhove
- 1355 Berlikum
- 1355 Enkhuizen
- 1355 Monnickendam
- 1355 Veere
- 1355 Weesp
- 1356 Woudrichem
- 1357 Edam
- 1357 Hoorn
- 1357 Klundert
- 1357 Megen
- 1362 Hardenberg
- 1364 Broek
- 1364 Rhenen
- 1366 Tholen
- 1371 Gennep
- 1372 Woerden
- 1372 Hindeloopen
- 1374 Franeker
- 1374 Reimerswaal
- 1374 Workum
- 1375 Borculo
- 1379 's-Heerenberg
- 1380 Ravenstein
- 1381 Geervliet
- 1382 Hagestein
- 1383 Bunschoten
- 1388 Bredevoort
- 1391 Baarn
- 1391 Heukelum
- 1394 Almelo
- 1395 Buren
- 1396 Haastrecht
- 1398 Noordwijk
- 1399 Oss
- 13?? Ameide
- 1402 Schellinkhout
- 1404 Keppel
- 1405 Goes
- 1407 Leerdam
- 1408 Coevorden
- 1410 Purmerend
- 1413 Nijkerk
- 1414 Abbekerk
- 1414 Hoogwoud
- 1414 Hem
- 1414 Spanbroek
- 1414 Weert
- 1414 Wognum
- 1415 Barsingerhorn
- 1415 Langedijk
- 1415 Niedorp
- 1415 Schagen
- 1415 Texel
- 1419 Terborg
- 1426 Sloten
- 1427 Zevenbergen
- 1431 Kortgene
- 1439 Eemnes-Binnen
- 1442 Gramsbergen
- 1452 Valkenburg
- 1455 Bolsward
- 1456 Sneek
- 1469 Heenvliet
- 1477 Brouwershaven
- 1480 Ravestein
- 1482 Bronkhorst
- 1487 Zevenaar
- 1506 Philippine
- 1574 Arnemuiden
- 1584 Terneuzen
- 1585 Willemstad
- 1672 Blokzijl
- 1806 Austerlitz
- 1806 The Hague (Den Haag/'s-Gravenhage)
- 1809 Assen
- 1809 Meppel
- 1809 Oosterhout
- 1809 Roosendaal
- 1809 Tilburg
- 1811 Maassluis
- 1812 Zaandam
- 1816 Sas van Gent
- 1819 Delfzijl
- 1819 Winschoten
- 1825 Delfshaven

== See also ==
- Town privileges
- History of urban centers in the Dutch Low Countries
- City status in the United Kingdom
- Scottish Burgh

== Bibliography ==
- Karl von Hegel (1891). Städte und gilden der germanischen völker im mittelalter (in German). Leipzig: Duncker & Humblot.
