= Zandstraat =

- Village
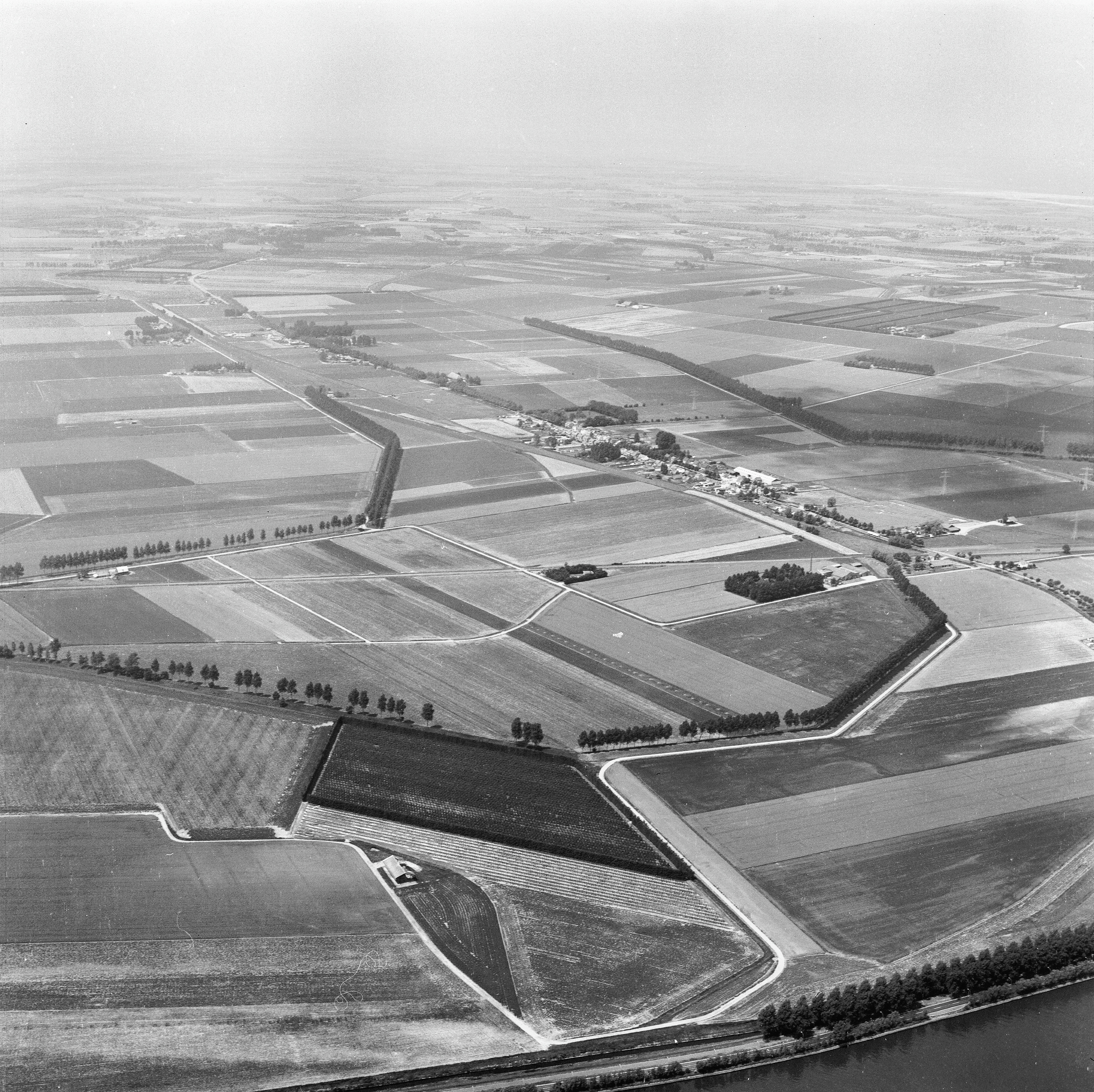
- Aerial photo of Zandstraat

- Location in the province of Zeeland in the Netherlands Zandstraat (Netherlands)
- Coordinates: 51°15′57″N 3°48′37″E
- Country: Netherlands
- Province: Zeeland
- Municipality: Terneuzen
- Time zone: UTC+1 (CET)
  - Summer (DST): UTC+2 (CEST)
- Postal code: 4551
- Dialing code: 0115

Zandstraat is a small village in the Dutch province of Zeeland. It is a part of the municipality of Terneuzen, and lies about 27 km southeast of Vlissingen.

Zandstraat is not a statistical entity, and the postal authorities have placed it under Sas van Gent. Zandstraat developed after 1848 when the land was poldered. It consists of about 150 houses. The Catholic Pastor van Erk Church was built in 1949 and decommissioned in 2013.
