= Overslag, Netherlands =

Overslag
- Village
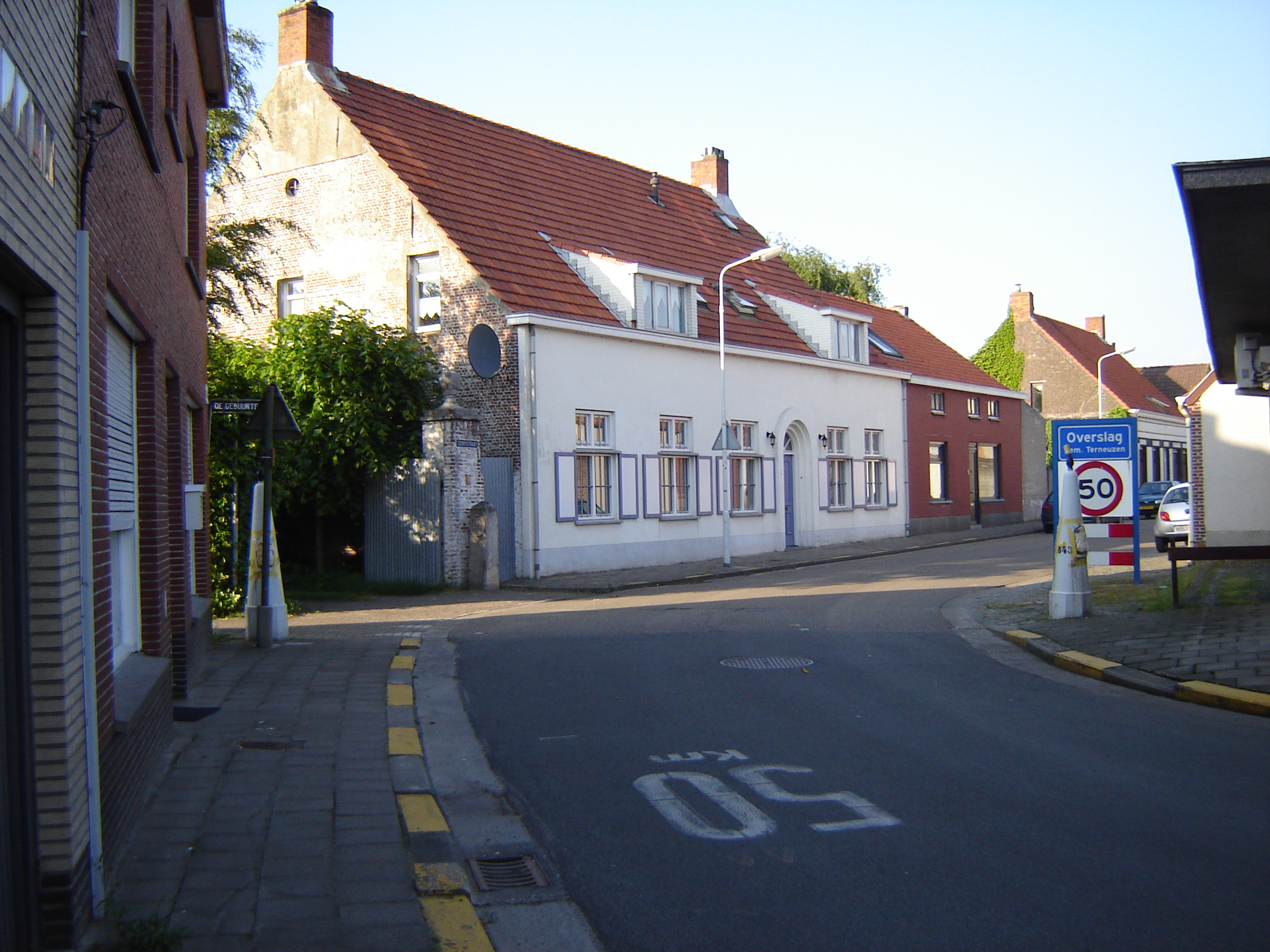
- View on the Dutch side

- Coat of arms

- Location in the province of Zeeland in the Netherlands Overslag (Netherlands)
- Coordinates: 51°12′3″N 3°53′23″E
- Country: Netherlands
- Province: Zeeland
- Municipality: Terneuzen

Area
  - Total: 6.84 km^{2} (2.64 sq mi)
- Elevation: 2.1 m (6.9 ft)

Population (2021)
  - Total: 235
  - Density: 34.4/km^{2} (89.0/sq mi)
- Time zone: UTC+1 (CET)
  - Summer (DST): UTC+2 (CEST)
- Postal code: 4575
- Dialing code: 0115

Overslag is a village in the Dutch province of Zeeland. It is a part of the municipality of Terneuzen, and lies about 36 km southeast of Vlissingen.

The village was first mentioned in 1542 as "ten Overslach", and means place where goods could be transferred. It was located where the canal from Axel and canal from the Belgian Wachtebeke were closed together. It is a border village which is cut in two by the Netherlands-Belgian border. In 1547, the Sassevaart was dug and Overslag become obsolete for the transfer of goods. The parish church is located on the Belgian side. During World War I, it was not possible to completely shut the border and the Wire of Death, a lethal electric fence, ran through the village.

Overslag was a separate municipality until 1970, when it was merged with Axel.

== Gallery ==
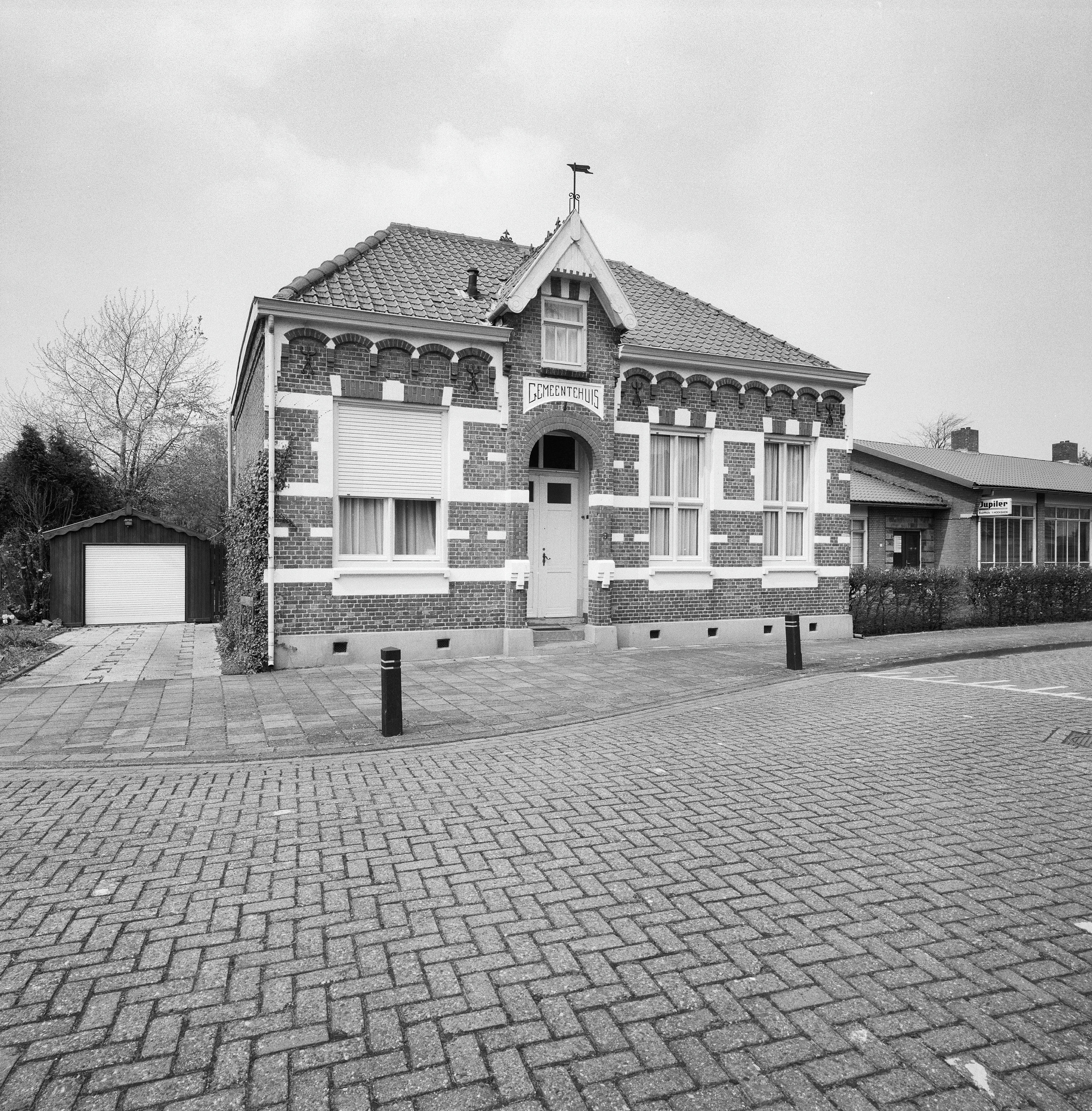
Former town hall

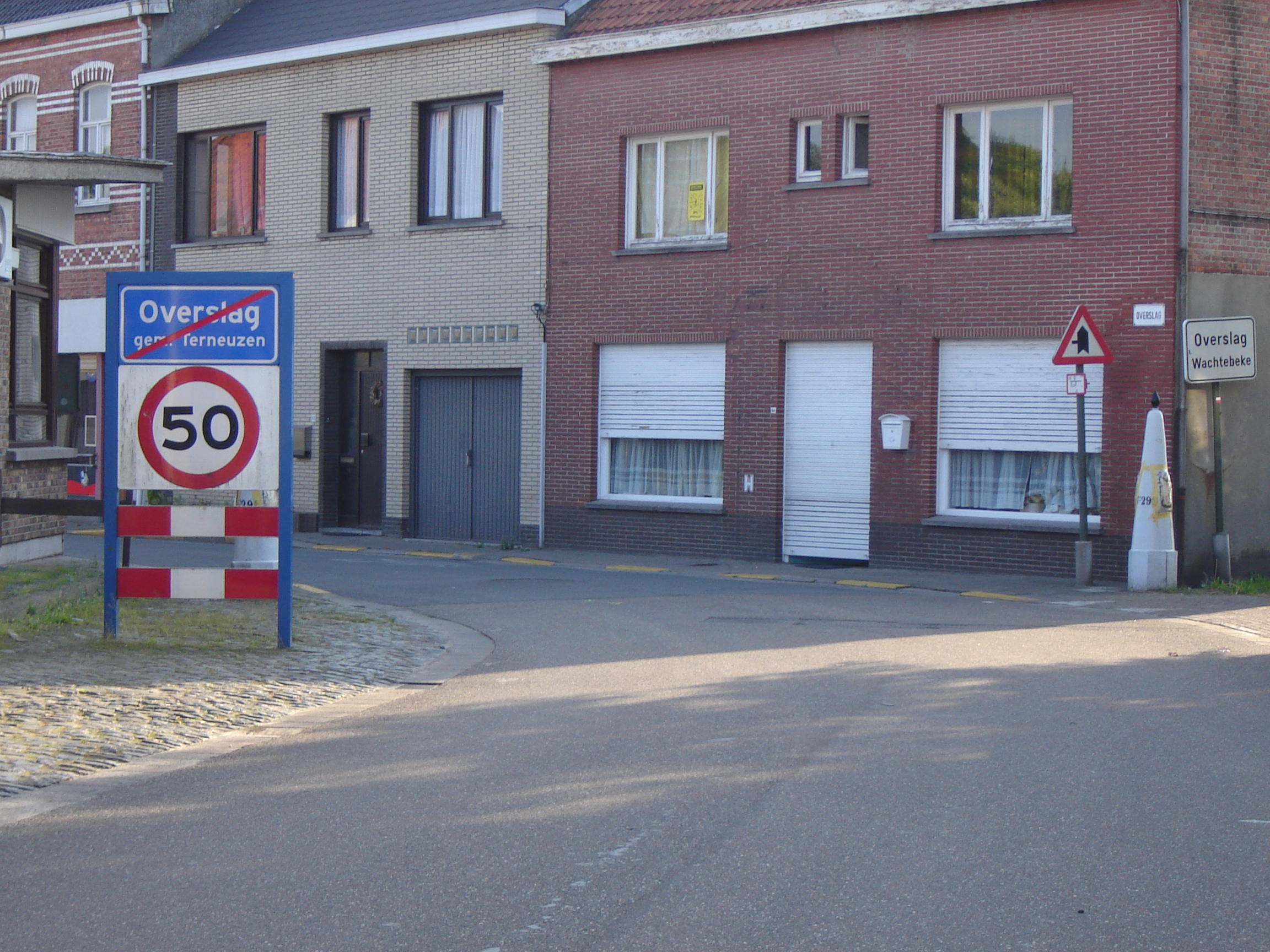
View on Belgian side
