= Hoek, Zeeland =

Hoek
- Village
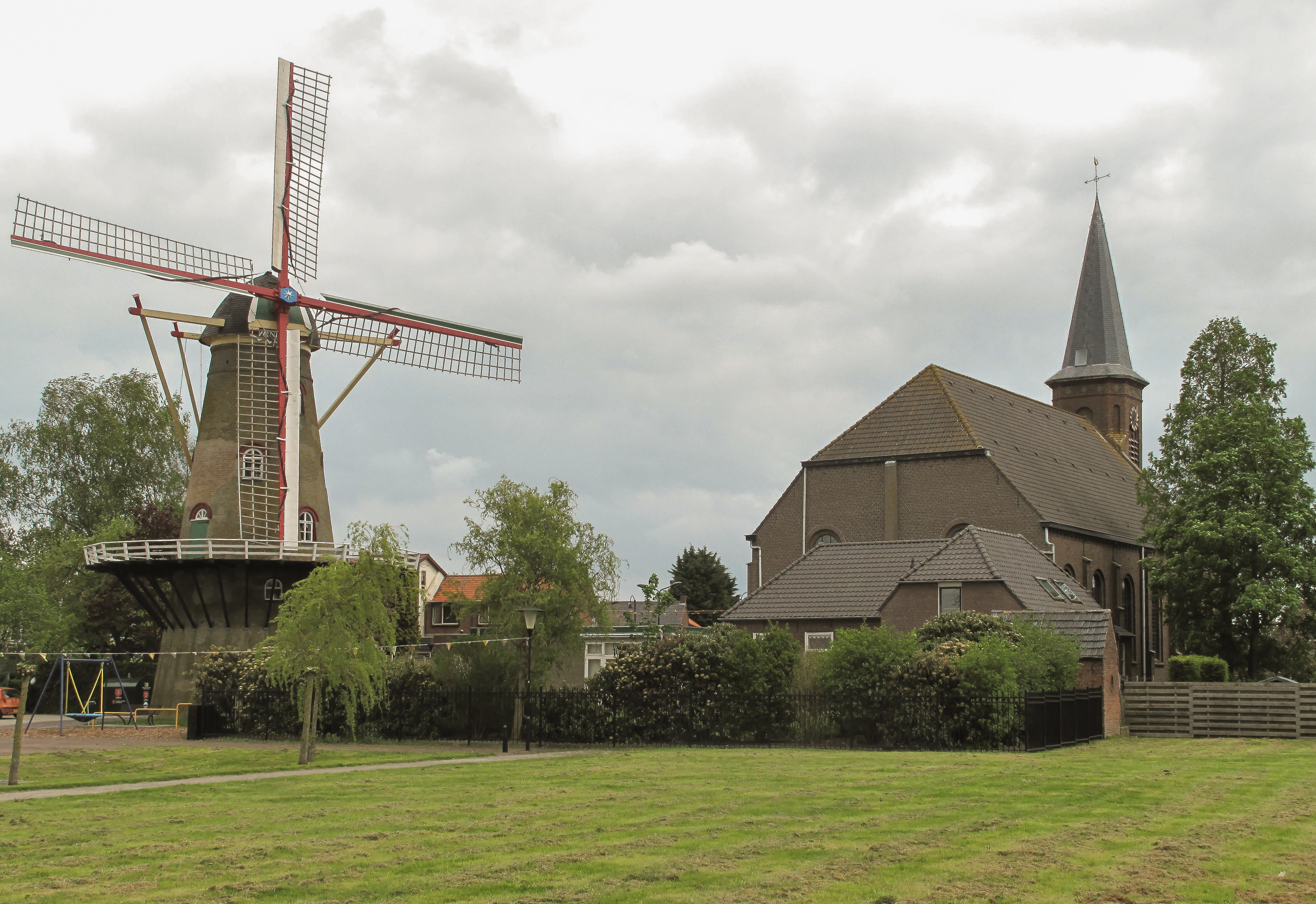
- Wind mill and Dutch Reformed church

- Flag Coat of arms

- Location in the province of Zeeland in the Netherlands Hoek (Netherlands)
- Coordinates: 51°18′34″N 3°46′45″E
- Country: Netherlands
- Province: Zeeland
- Municipality: Terneuzen

Area
  - Total: 33.29 km^{2} (12.85 sq mi)
- Elevation: 1.6 m (5.2 ft)

Population (2021)
  - Total: 2,940
  - Density: 88.3/km^{2} (229/sq mi)
- Time zone: UTC+1 (CET)
  - Summer (DST): UTC+2 (CEST)
- Postal code: 4542
- Dialing code: 0115

Hoek (Dutch pronunciation: [ɦuk]) is a village in the municipality of Terneuzen in the Dutch province of Zeeland. It lies about 22 km south-east of Vlissingen and about 30 km north of Ghent in Belgium.

== History ==
Hoek is a dike village which developed at a location where three dikes met. To defend the former inlet Braakman, Fort Nassau was built near Hoek in 1588 opposite the fortress of Philippine. After Hulst was conquered by the Dutch Republic in 1645, the fort started to deteriorate.

The Dutch Reformed church is an aisleless church from 1608. In 1900, a tower was added in Renaissance Revival style with a needle spire. In 2015, it was severely damaged by fire, and restored in 2016.

The grist mill Windlust was built in 1857. It was in service until 1958. It was restored between 1979 and 1980 and returned to active service.

Hoek was home to 420 people in 1840. Hoek was a separate municipality until 1970 when it became part of the municipality of Terneuzen.

== Gallery ==
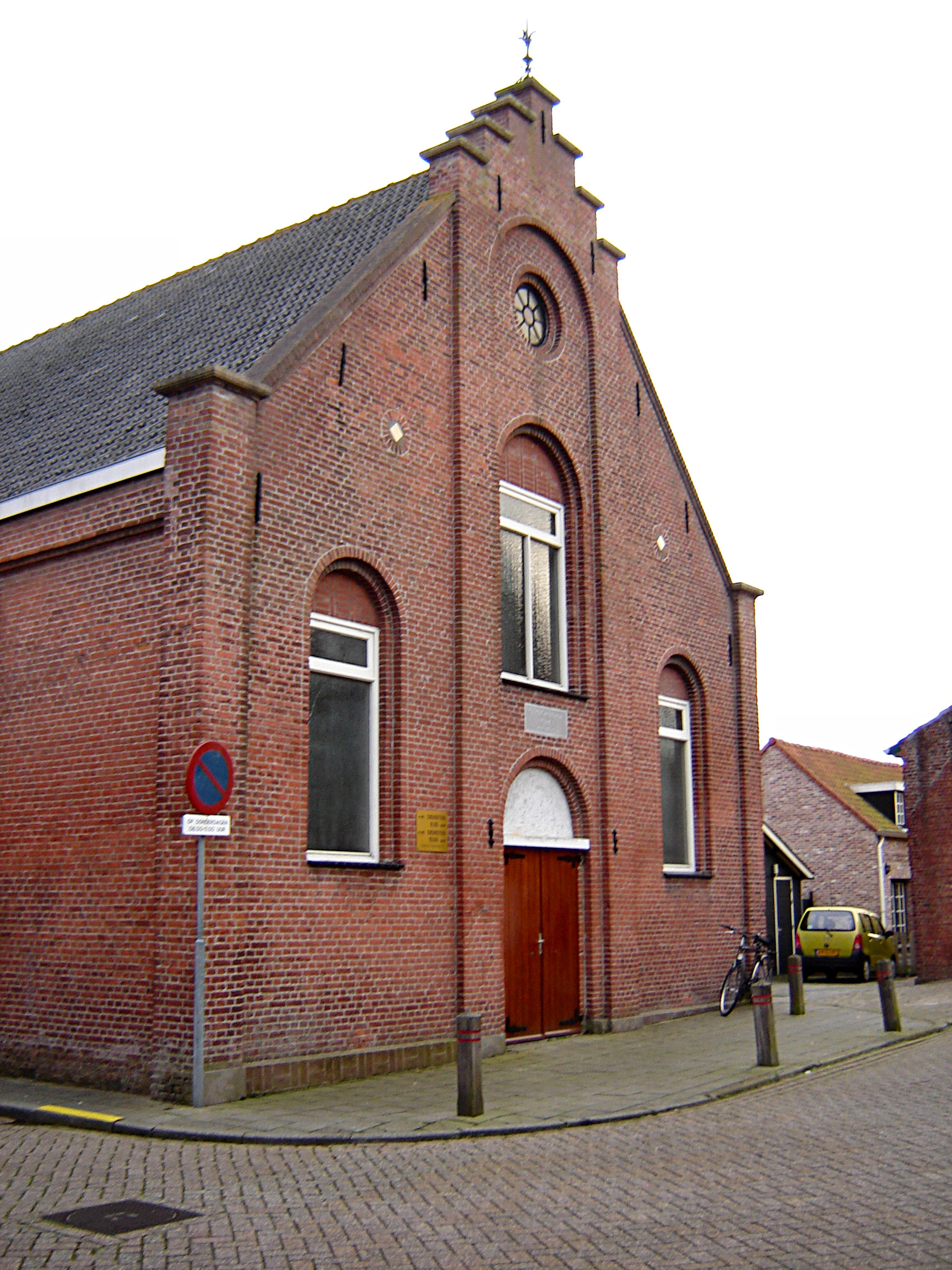
Church of the Reformed Churches in the Netherlands (Liberated) in Hoek.

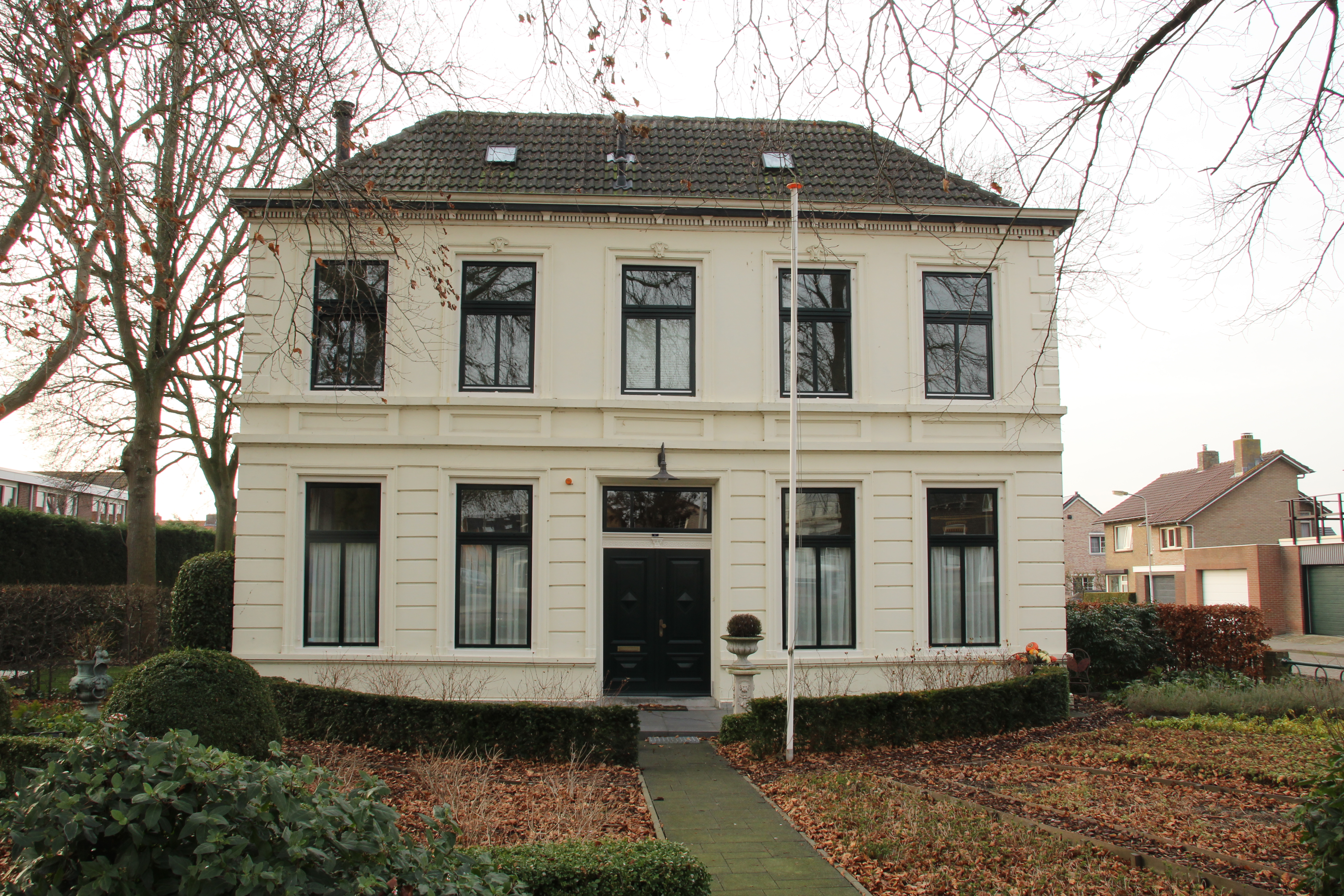
Villa in Hoek

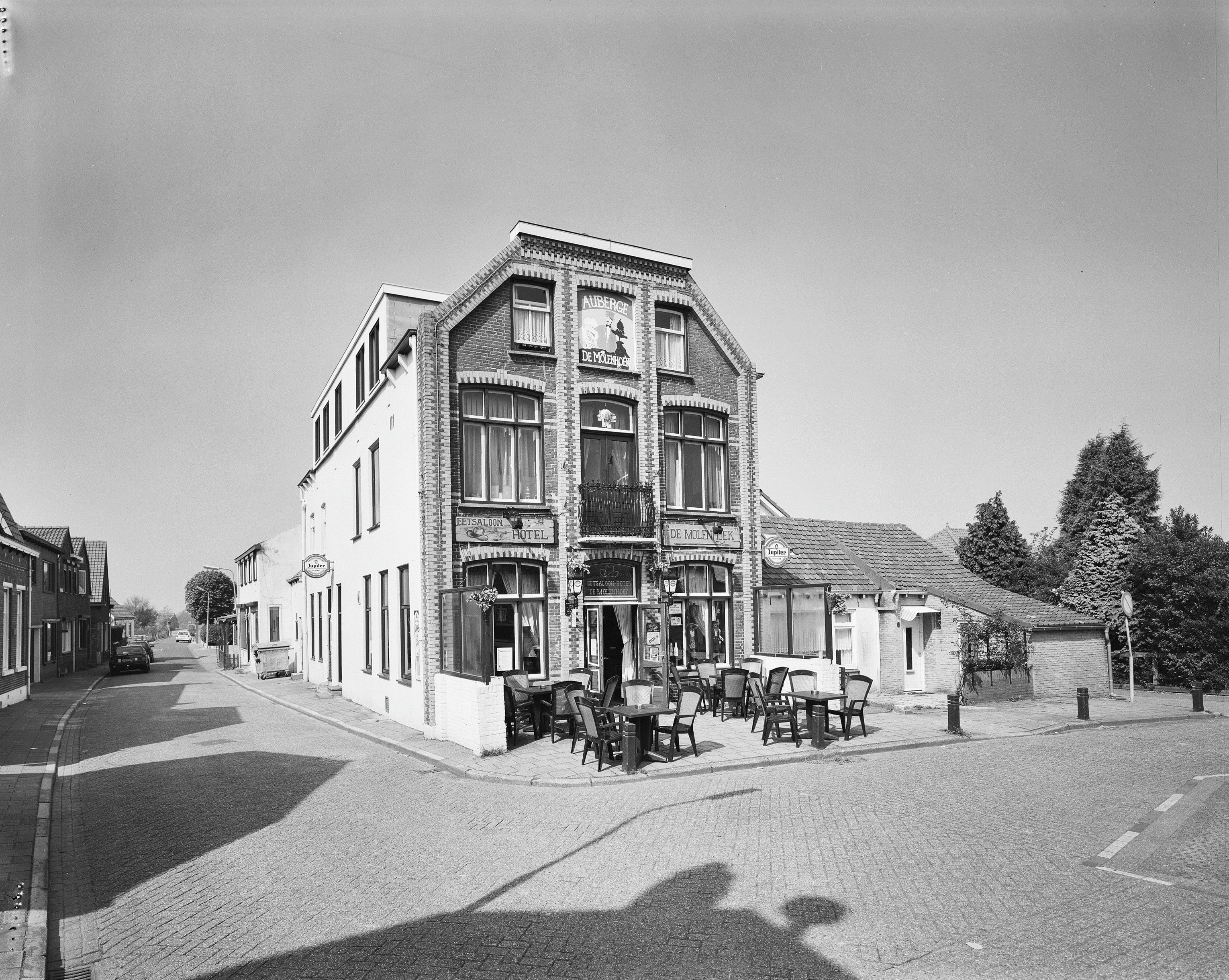
Hotel in Hoek
