= Biervliet =

- Small city
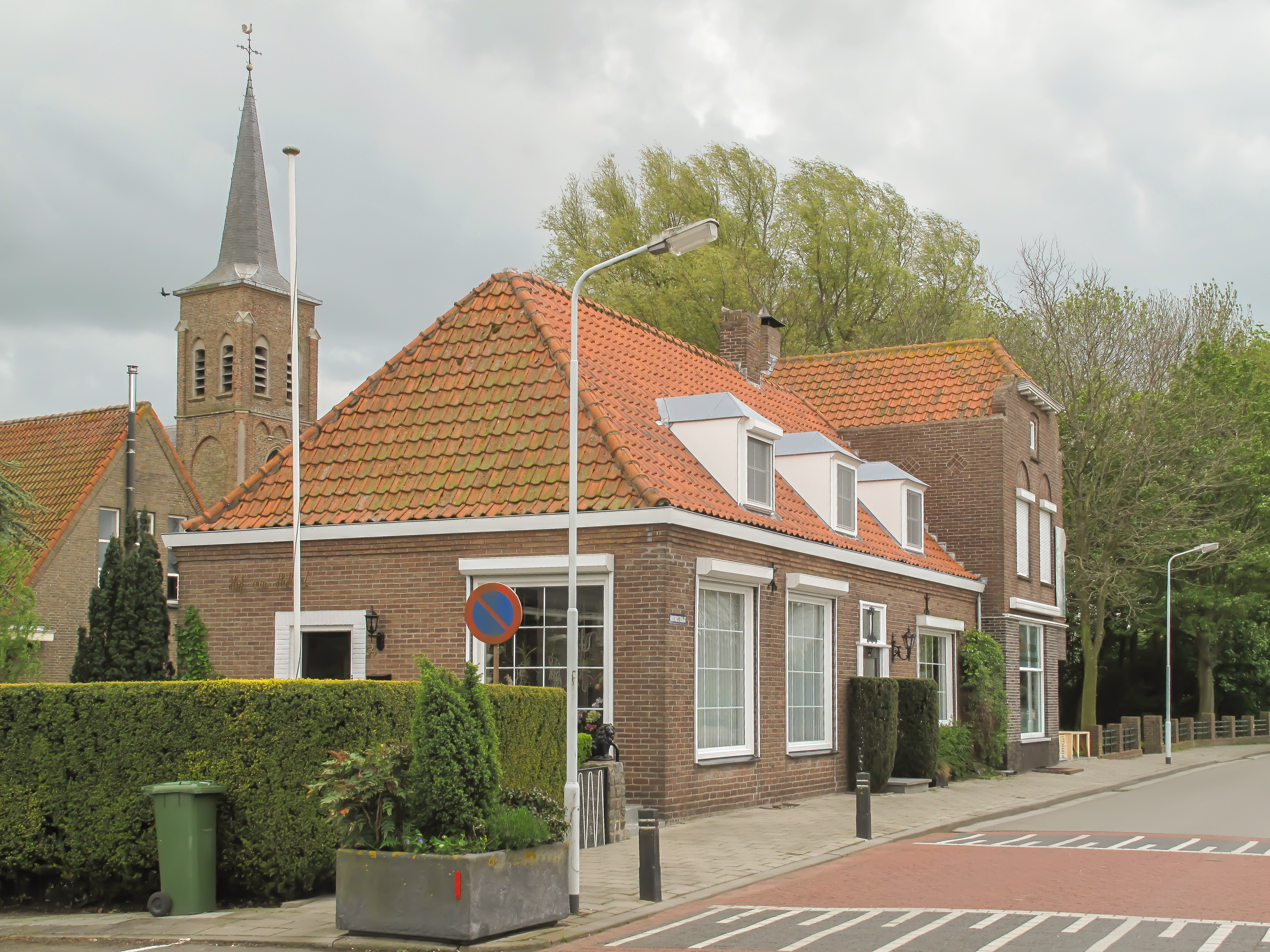
- Street view with Our Lady Immaculate Conception church

- Flag Coat of arms

- Location in the province of Zeeland in the Netherlands Biervliet (Netherlands)
- Coordinates: 51°19′41″N 3°41′8″E
- Country: Netherlands
- Province: Zeeland
- Municipality: Terneuzen

Area
  - Total: 21.34 km^{2} (8.24 sq mi)
- Elevation: 2.9 m (9.5 ft)

Population (2021)
  - Total: 1,550
  - Density: 72.6/km^{2} (188/sq mi)
- Time zone: UTC+1 (CET)
  - Summer (DST): UTC+2 (CEST)
- Postal code: 4521
- Dialing code: 0115

Biervliet is a small city in the Dutch province of Zeeland. It is a part of the municipality of Terneuzen, and lies about 16 km South of Vlissingen.

Biervliet received city rights in 1183. It was originally a fishing village which specialised in herring. The flood of 1375 resulted in the creation of the former inlet Braakman, and after the St. Elizabeth's flood of 1404, Biervliet was on an island. In 1572, it was captured by the Geuzen. From 1619 onwards, the surrounding areas were enclosed with dikes and harbour disappeared in 1866.

The Dutch Reformed Church in Biervliet has a number of intact stained windows dating from 1660 to 1661. The Catholic Our Lady Immaculate Conception church is a three-aisled Gothic Revival church which was built between 1857 and 1858 to replace the medieval Mary church.

Biervliet was home to 1,860 people in 1840. Biervliet used to be an independent municipality. In 1970, it was merged into Terneuzen.

== Notable people ==
It is the home town of William Buckels (or Beuckelszoon), a 14th-century fisherman credit for inventing the process of preparing soused herring known as gibbing.

== Gallery ==
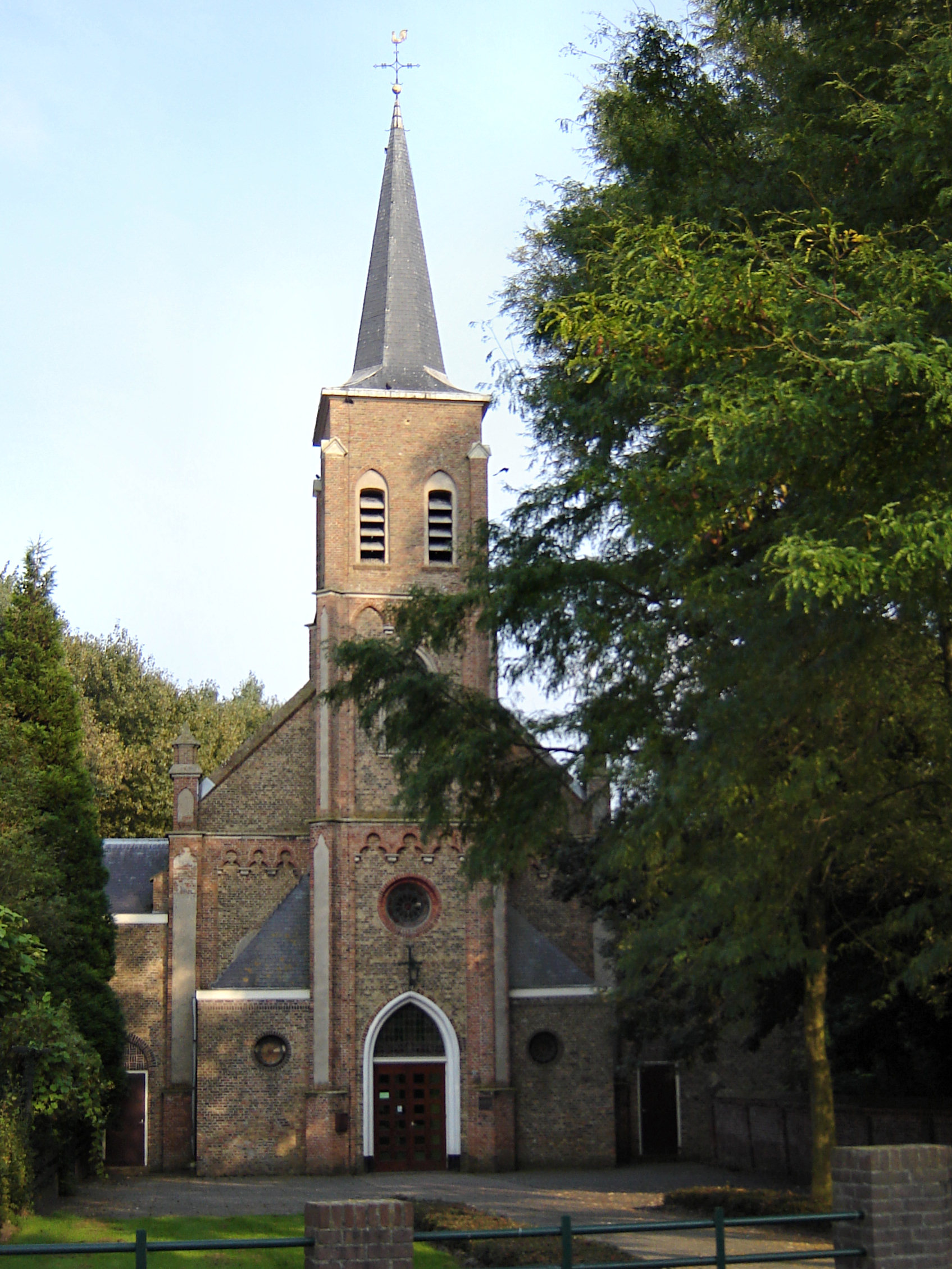
Our Lady Immaculate Conception church

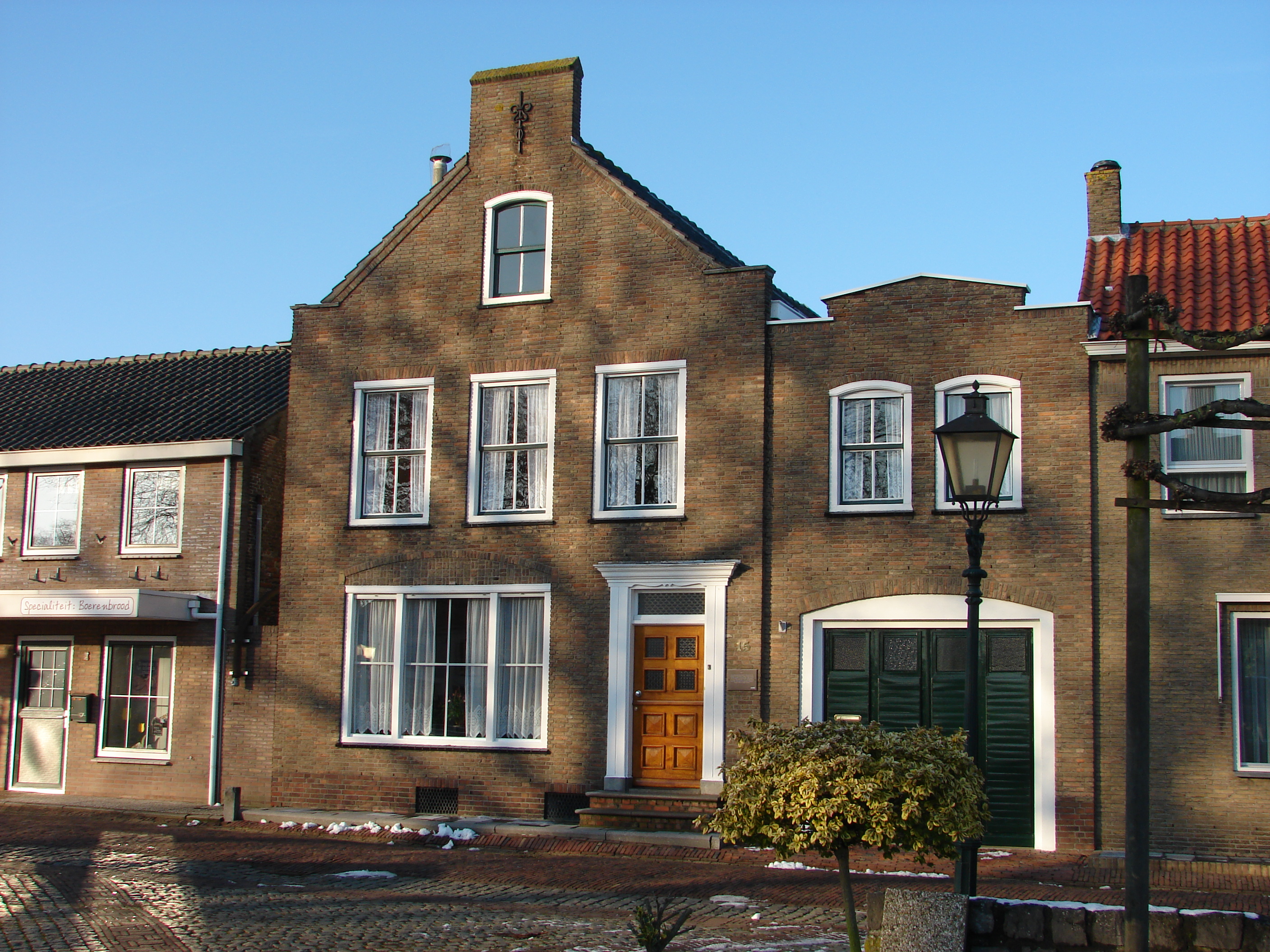
House in Biervliet

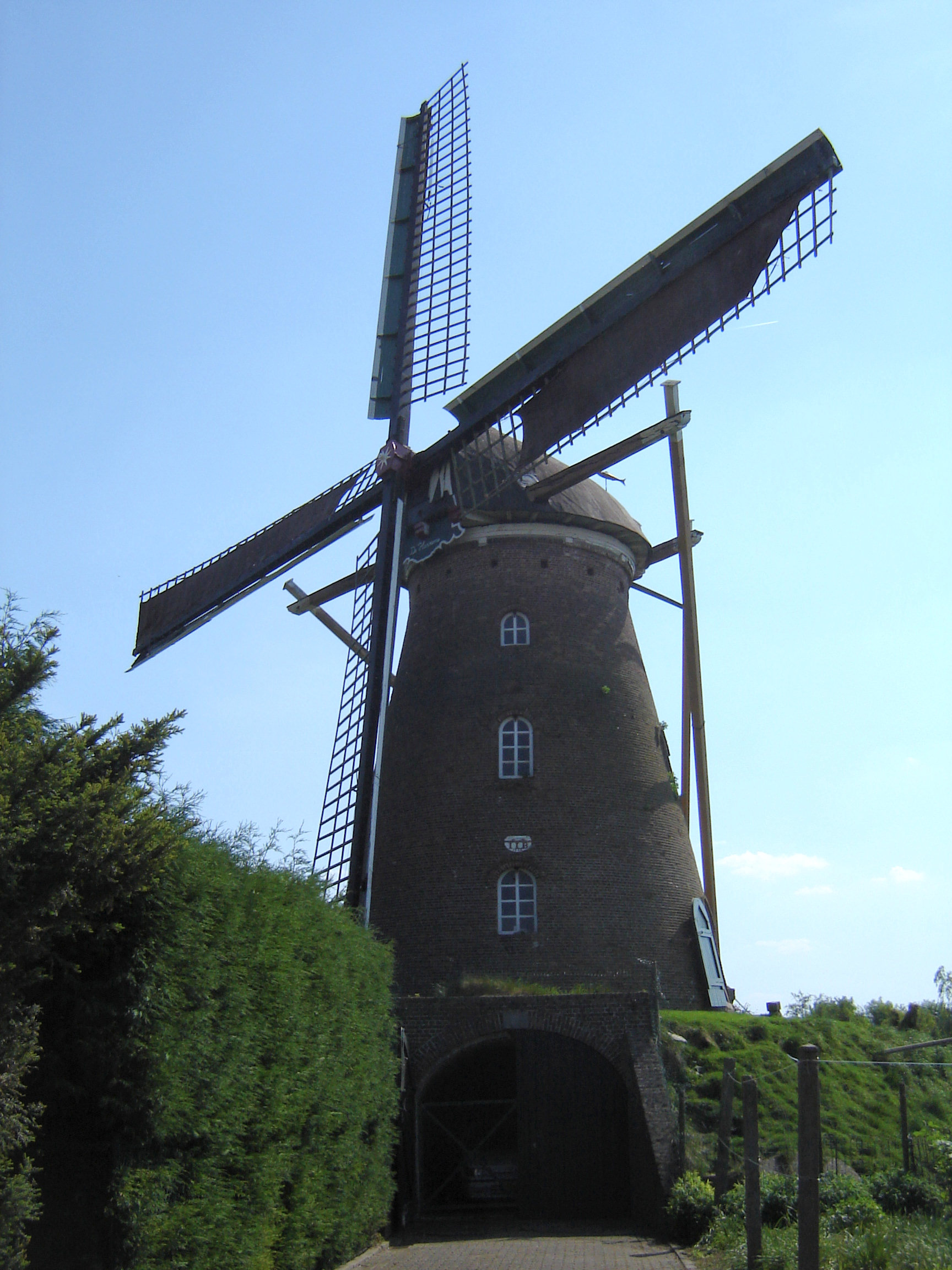
Wind mill De Harmonie

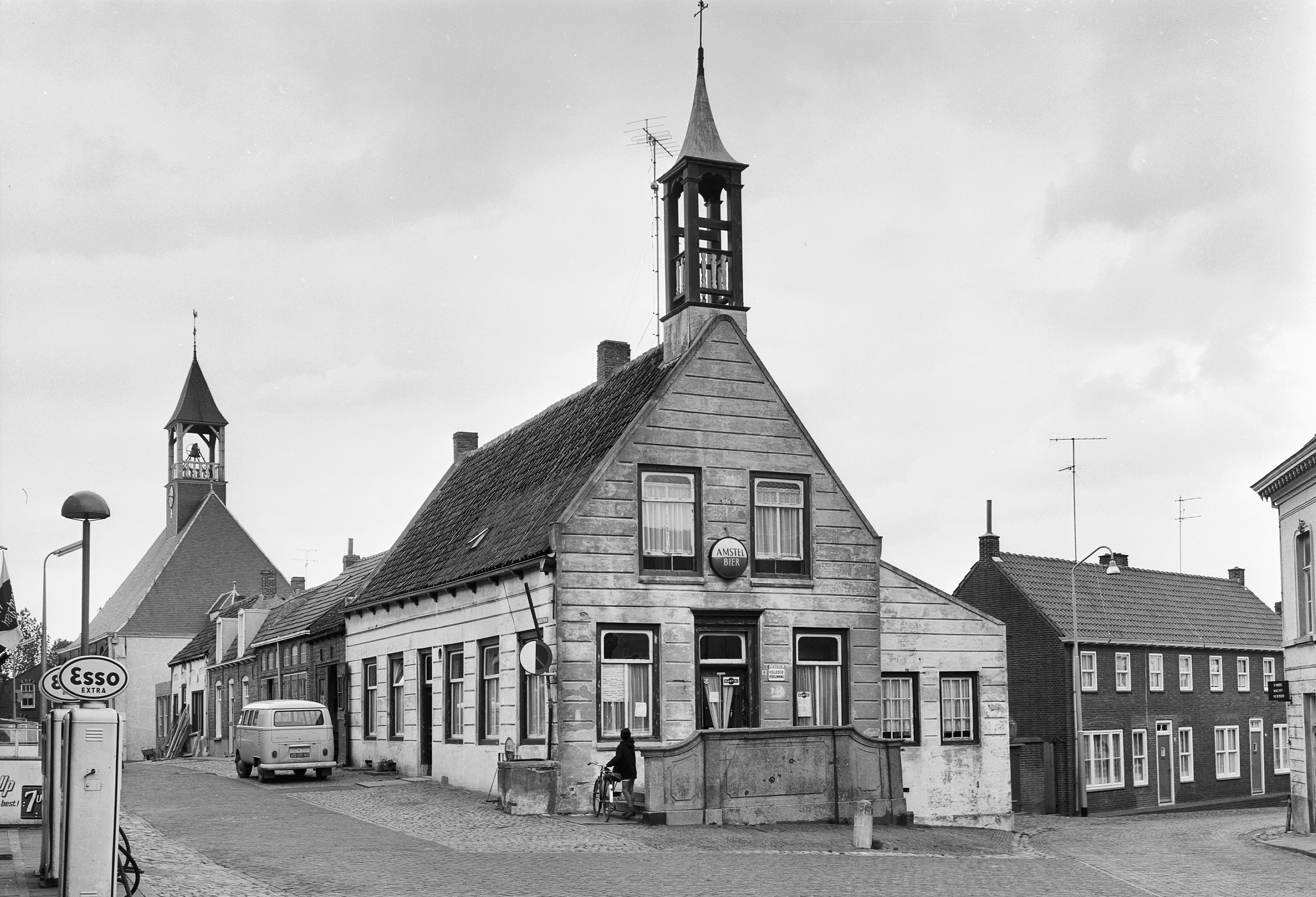
Former town hall (1967)
