= Terneuzen =

- Municipality
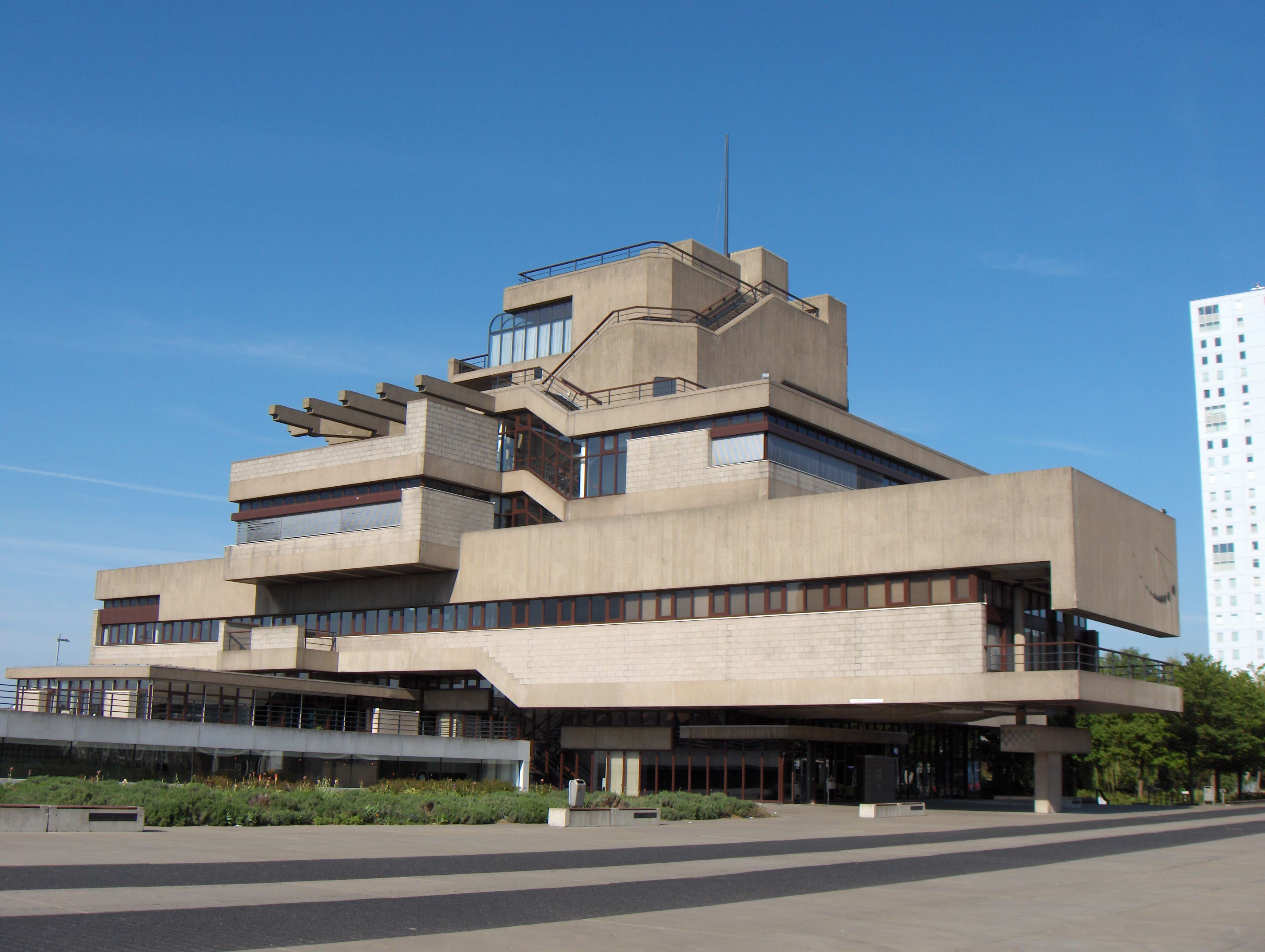
- Terneuzen city hall

- Flag Coat of arms

- Location in Zeeland
- Coordinates: 51°20′N 3°50′E
- Country: Netherlands
- Province: Zeeland

Government
  - Body: Municipal council
  - Mayor: Franc Weerwind (D66)

Area
  - Total: 317.76 km^{2} (122.69 sq mi)
  - Land: 250.38 km^{2} (96.67 sq mi)
  - Water: 67.38 km^{2} (26.02 sq mi)
- Elevation: 1 m (3.3 ft)

Population (January 2026)
  - Total: 55,955
  - Density: 223/km^{2} (580/sq mi)
- Demonym: Terneuzenaar
- Time zone: UTC+1 (CET)
  - Summer (DST): UTC+2 (CEST)
- Postal codes: 4521, 4531–4533, 4535–4539, 4541–4543, 4551, 4553, 4554, 4571, 4574–4576
- Area code: 0115
- Website: www.terneuzen.nl

Terneuzen (Dutch pronunciation: [tərˈnøːzə(n)]) is a city and municipality in the southwestern Netherlands, in the province of Zeeland, in the middle of Zeelandic Flanders. With 55,955 inhabitants, it is the most populous municipality of Zeeland.

== History ==
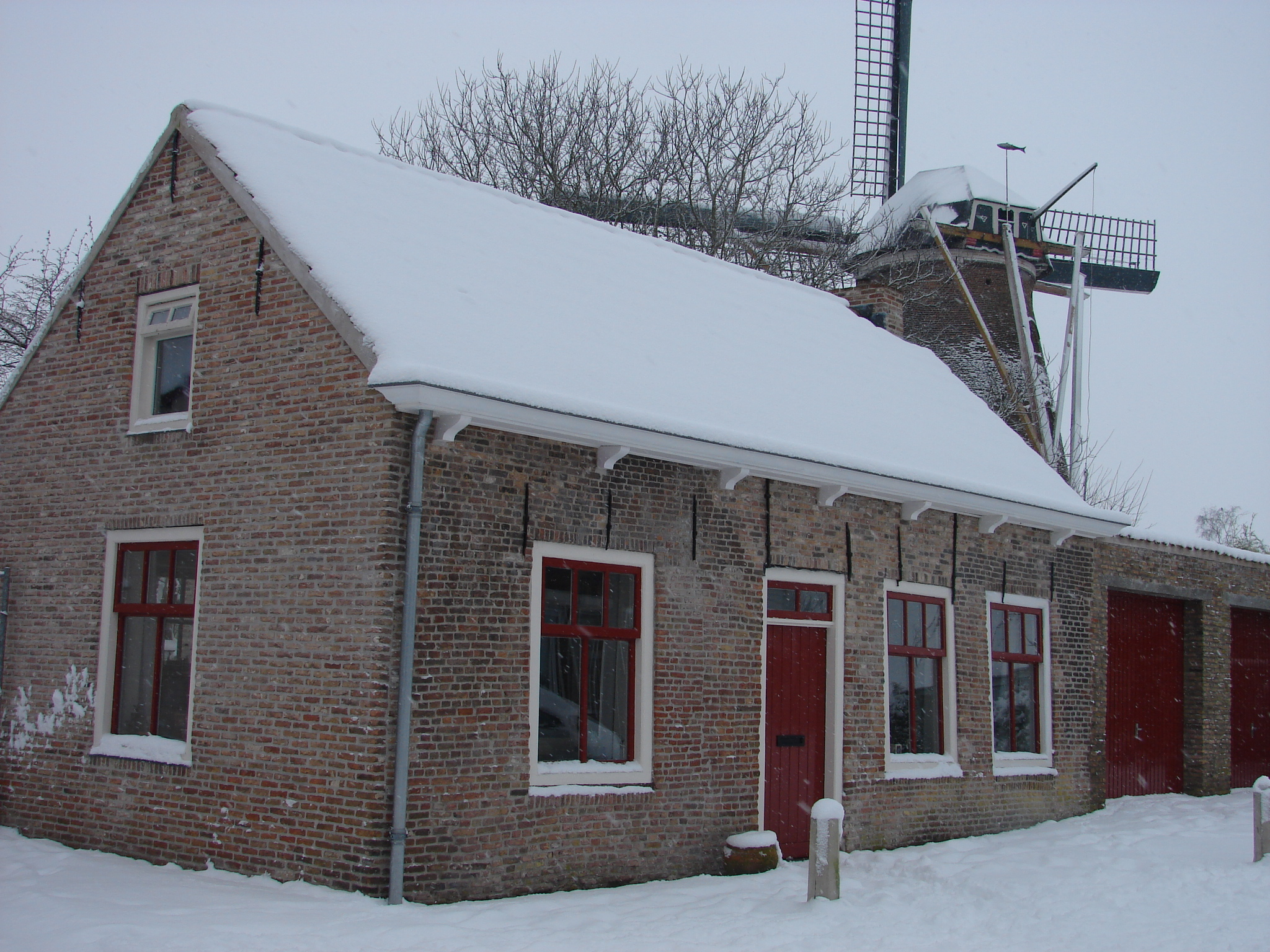
Historical house (national site) in Terneuzen

Its first known mention as ter Nose dates from 1325, and Terneuzen was a strategically located port on the waterways to Ghent, in present-day Belgium.

It received provisional city rights in 1584, which were confirmed two years later.

Terneuzen is often cited as the place of residence of Willem van der Decken, the captain of the legendary ghost ship from the story of the Flying Dutchman. While most early versions referred to Amsterdam, Frederick Marryat first mentioned Terneuzen as the place of residence in his 1839 novel The Phantom Ship.

The municipality was officially called Neuzen until a name change in 1877.

The municipality of Terneuzen absorbed the neighbouring municipalities of Biervliet, Hoek and Zaamslag on 1 April 1970 and the municipalities of Axel and Sas van Gent in 2003.

== Geography ==
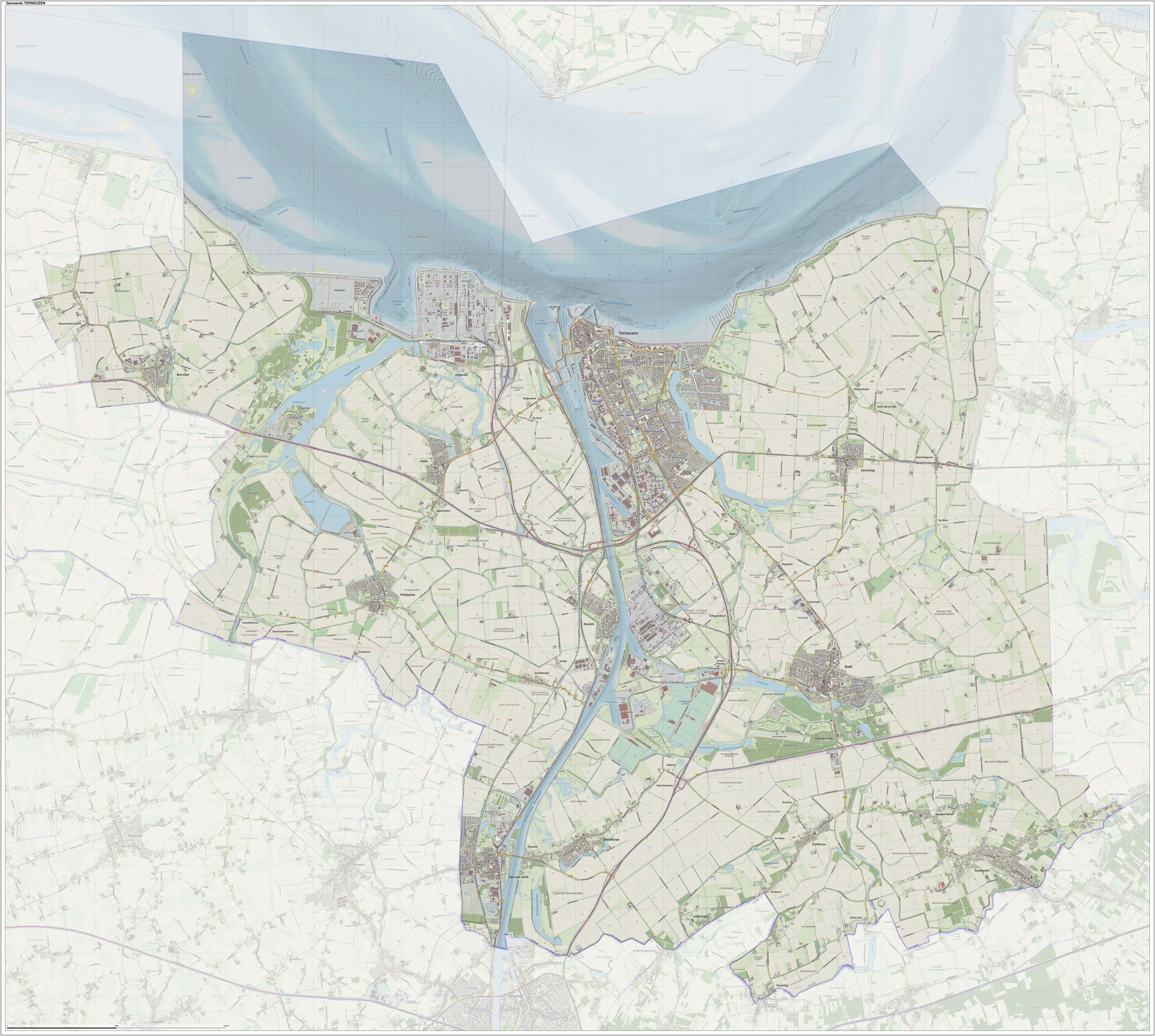
Map of the municipality of Terneuzen, June 2015

The city of Terneuzen is located on the southern shore of the Western Scheldt estuary.

The municipality of Terneuzen consists of the following population centres:

- Terneuzen (city) (25,450)
- Axel (7,785)
- Sas van Gent (3,850)
- Zaamslag (2,780)
- Hoek (2,930)
- Koewacht (2,495)
- Sluiskil (2,240)
- Philippine (2,080)
- Westdorpe (1,890)
- Biervliet (1,550)
- Zuiddorpe (900)
- Spui (175)
- Overslag (250)

== Economy ==
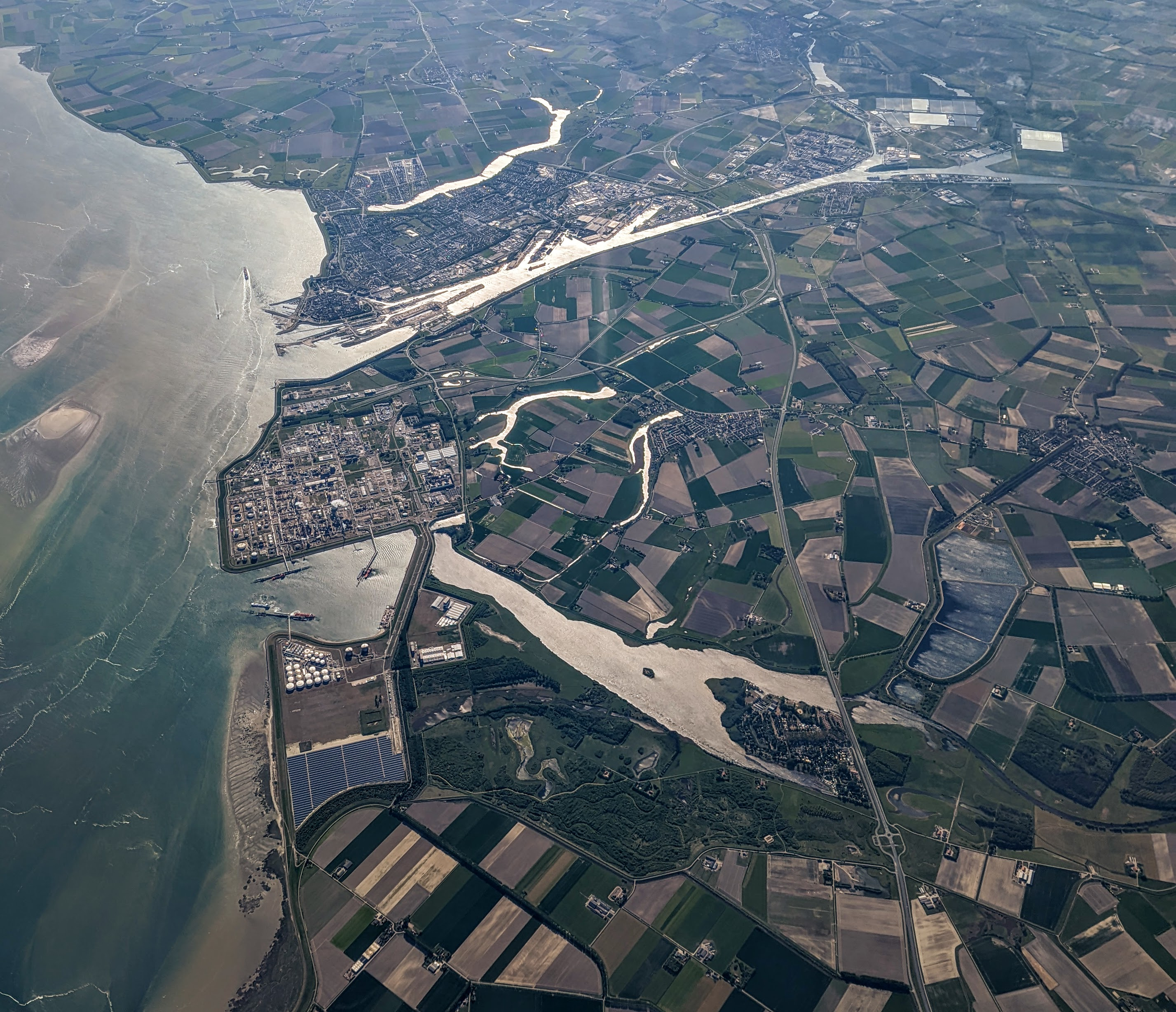
Aerial view of Terneuzen from the west, including the Dow chemical plant below the Ghent–Terneuzen Canal, and the old town above it

Industry is the largest economic sector in the municipality in terms of jobs, while logistics and agriculture play an important role too.

The Ghent–Terneuzen Canal is still an important shipping route connecting the Port of Ghent. The port of Terneuzen is the third-largest in the Netherlands, after those of Rotterdam and Amsterdam. The largest site of the Dow Chemical Company outside of the United States, which opened in 1965, is located in Terneuzen.

== Transport ==
Terneuzen can be reached from the rest of the Netherlands via the Western Scheldt Tunnel, which opened in March 2003. Terneuzen is not linked to the rest of the Netherlands by rail, although the Dow Chemical plant is served by a freight-only line to Ghent in Belgium (Terneuzen's passenger rail service was withdrawn in 1951).

== See also ==
- List of national heritage sites in Terneuzen

== Notable residents ==
- Lupus Hellinck (1493 or 1494 – 1541) a Flemish composer of the Renaissance
- Sir Bernard de Gomme (1620–1685) a military engineer
- Pieter Paulus (1753–1796) a jurist, fiscal (prosecutor) of the Admiralty of the Maze and politician
- Francien de Zeeuw (1922–2015) a Dutch resistance fighter during WWII and the first female member of the Dutch armed forces
- Lodewijk van den Berg (1932–2022) astronaut on a Challenger Space Shuttle mission
- Jacques Hamelink (born 1939 in Driewegen – 2021) a poet, novelist and literary critic
- Klaas de Vries (born 1944) a omposer, co-founded the Rotterdam School of music
- Eric van Damme (born 1956) an economist
- Jos de Putter (born 1959) a film director, film critic and screenwriter
- Mark Janse (born 1959 in Sas van Gent) research professor in Asia Minor and Ancient Greek at Ghent University
- Erik de Bruyn (born 1962) film director and actor
- Peter van Dommelen (born 1966) an archaeologist and academic
- Sandra Roelofs (born 1968) former first lady of Georgia
