= Spui, Zeeland =

Spui
- Village
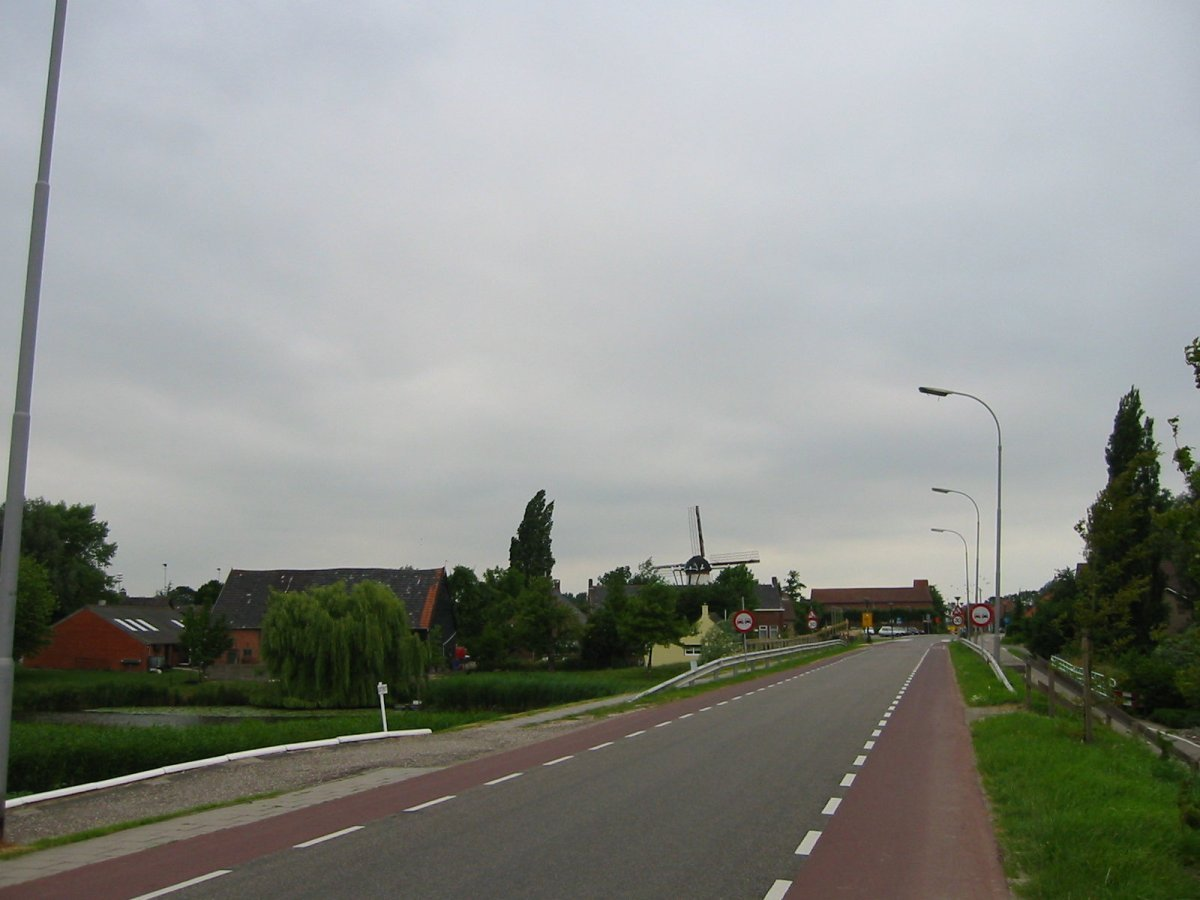
- View on Spui

- Location in the province of Zeeland in the Netherlands Spui (Netherlands)
- Coordinates: 51°17′52″N 3°52′43″E
- Country: Netherlands
- Province: Zeeland
- Municipality: Terneuzen

Area
  - Total: 1.29 km^{2} (0.50 sq mi)
- Elevation: 2.0 m (6.6 ft)

Population (2021)
  - Total: 190
  - Density: 150/km^{2} (380/sq mi)
- Time zone: UTC+1 (CET)
  - Summer (DST): UTC+2 (CEST)
- Postal code: 4539
- Dialing code: 0115

Spui is a village in the Dutch province of Zeeland. It is a part of the municipality of Terneuzen, and lies about 27 km southeast of Vlissingen.

The village was first mentioned in 1549 as "ter Zouter Speye", and refers to a type of discharge lock.

In 1941, the association building was converted into a Reformed Church. In 1974, it was no longer used, and has been converted in a Masonic lodge.

== Gallery ==
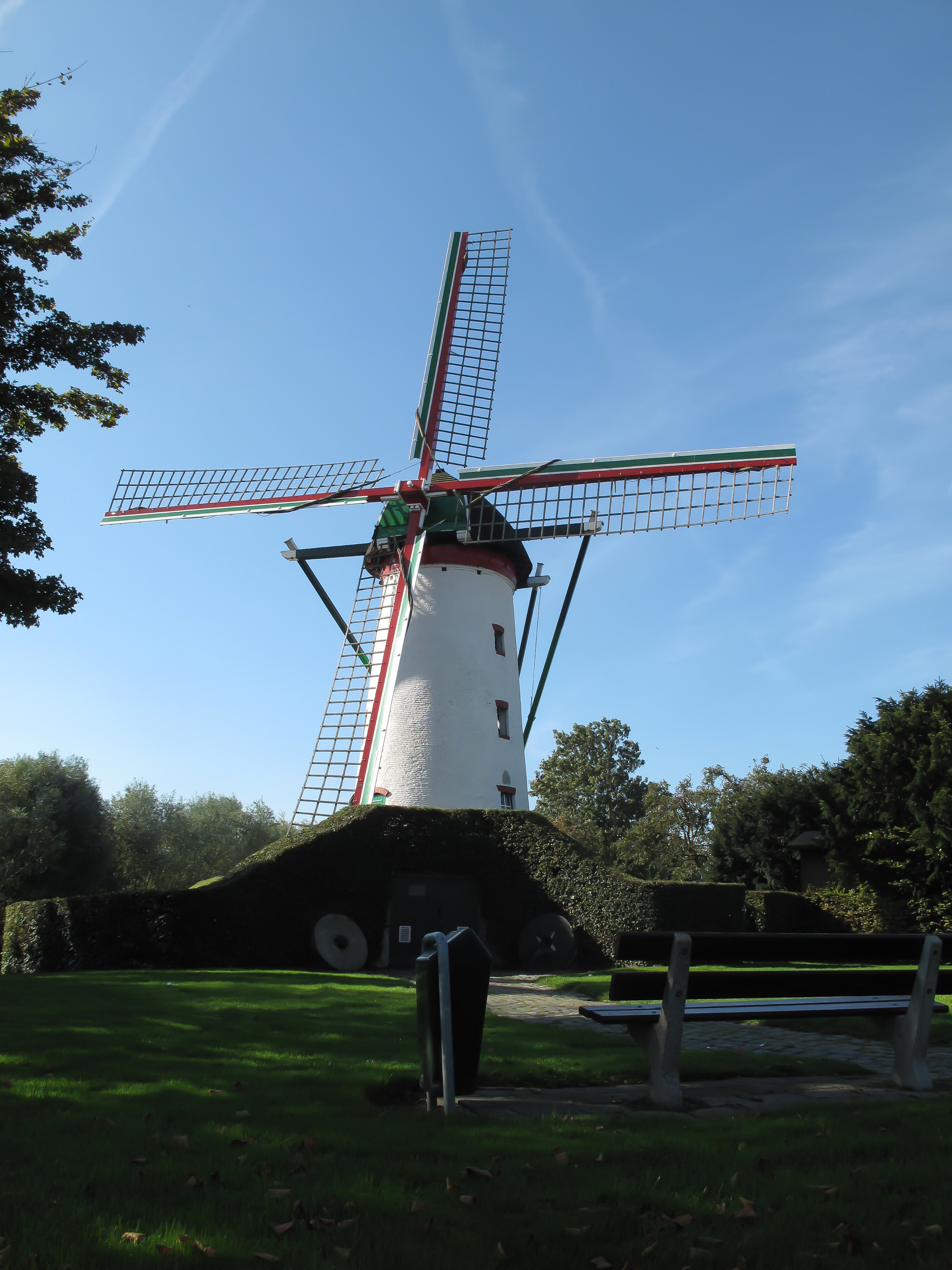
Spui, windmill: Eben Haëzer

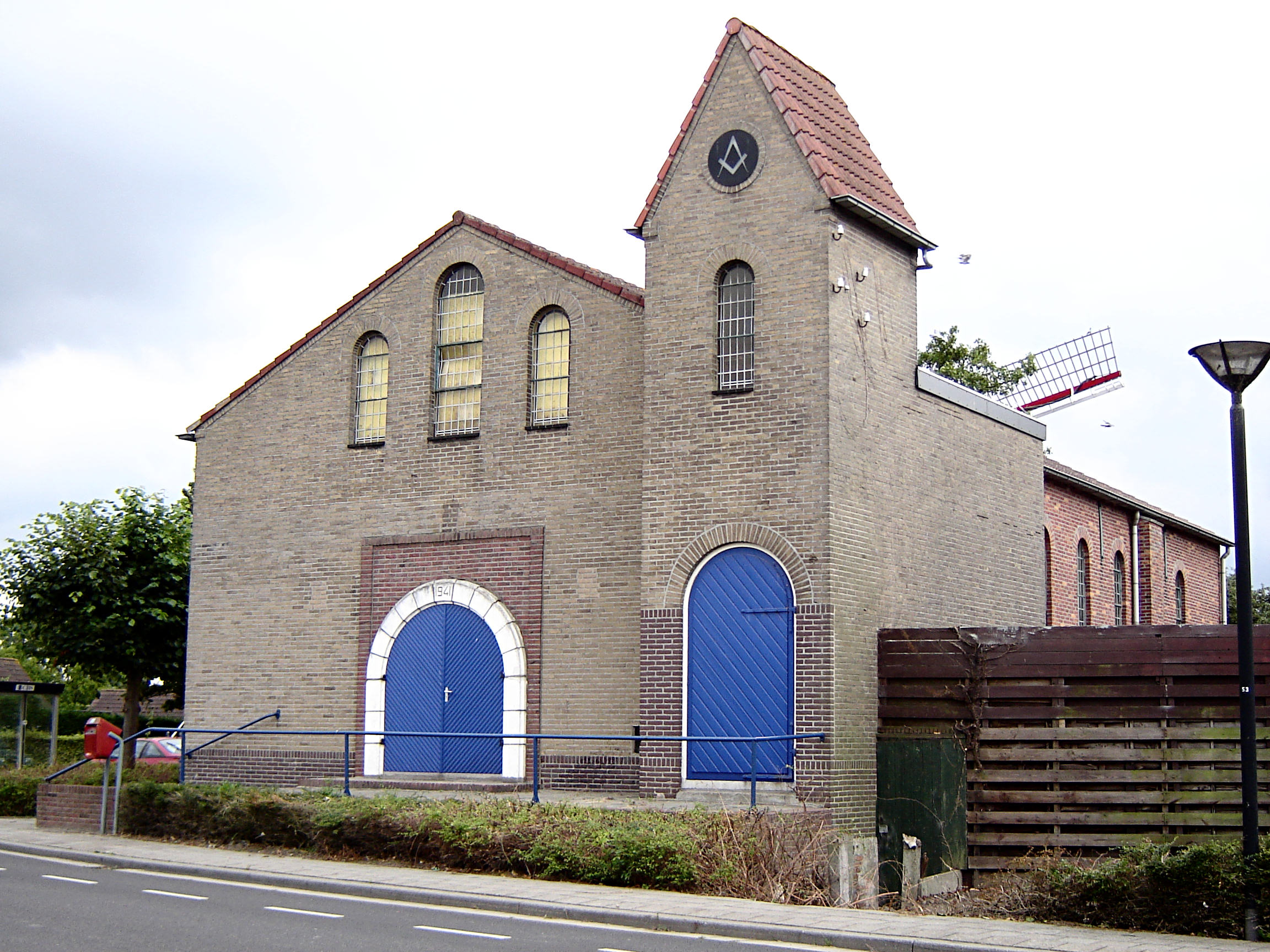
Former reformed church. Now Masonic lodge
