= Axel, Netherlands =

Axel
- City
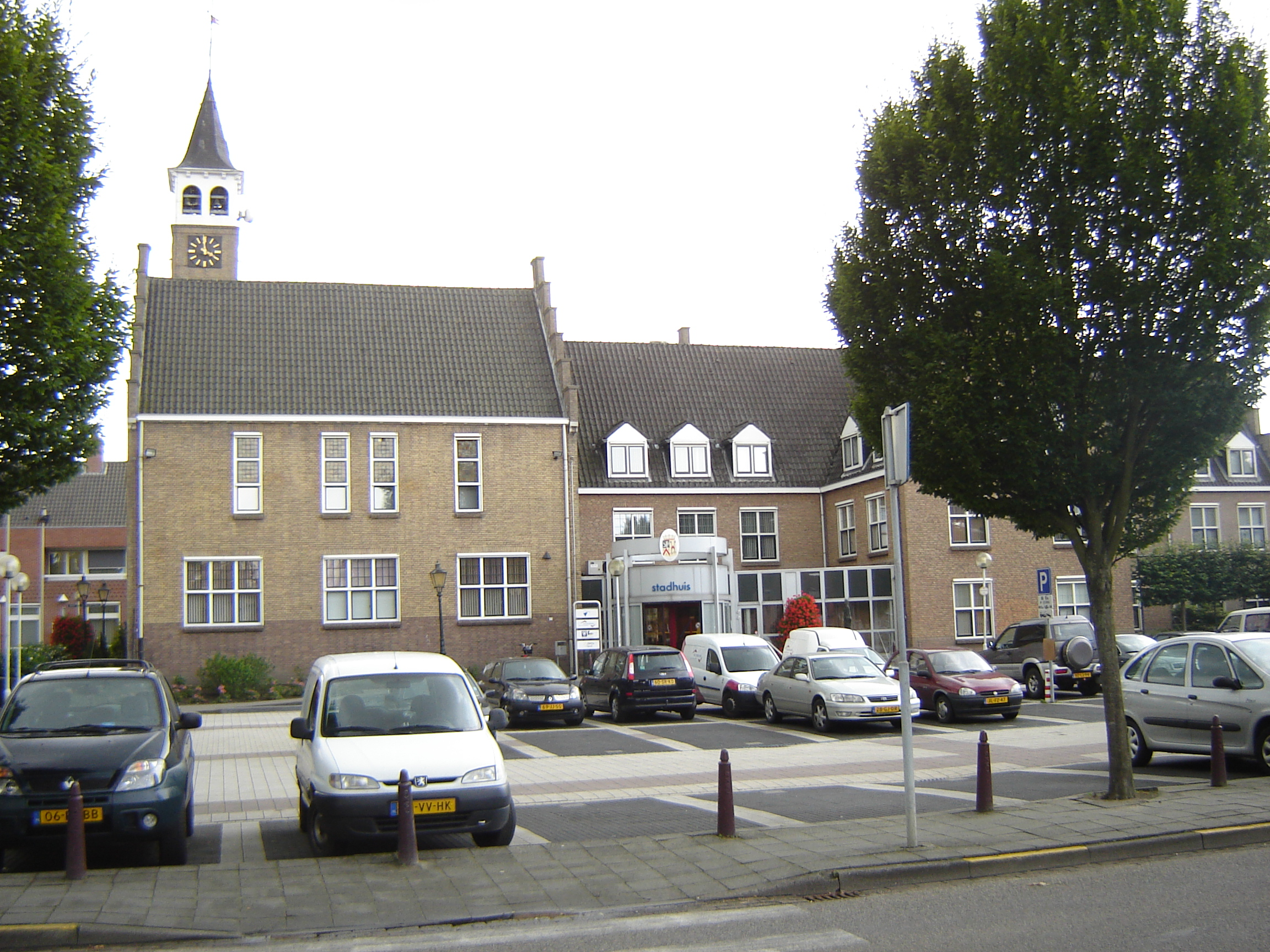
- Former town hall

- Flag Coat of arms

- Location in the province of Zeeland in the Netherlands Axel (Netherlands)
- Coordinates: 51°15′56″N 3°54′32″E
- Country: Netherlands
- Province: Zeeland
- Municipality: Terneuzen

Area
  - Total: 37.30 km^{2} (14.40 sq mi)
- Elevation: 0.5 m (1.6 ft)

Population (2021)
  - Total: 7,880
  - Density: 211/km^{2} (547/sq mi)
- Time zone: UTC+1 (CET)
  - Summer (DST): UTC+2 (CEST)
- Postal code: 4571
- Dialing code: 0115

Axel is a city in the southwest Netherlands. It is located in the municipality of Terneuzen, Zeeland, about 31 km southeast of Vlissingen. Axel received city rights in 1213.

== History ==
The city was first established between 987 and 994 as Axla. The etymology is unclear. Axel was located on the former creek Axelse Gat which had its mouth in the former Braakman inlet. A church was built around 1100, and a castle around 1200. It was a gateway to Ghent, and received city rights in 1213. The city was plundered around 1380 and in 1452 by Ghent. The All Saints' Flood of 1570 resulted in Axel finding itself on an island.

Axel was conquered by Maurice, Prince of Orange in 1586 and was fortified. In 1601, eight bastions and one ravelin were constructed around the city. Axel was a strategically important place, because it controlled access to Antwerp and Ghent which were in Spanish hands. In 1789, Axel was reattached to the mainland. The fortifications were removed in 1816. In 1851, Axel lost its harbour.

The Catholic St Gregorius the Great Church is a single-aisled church in Gothic Revival style which was built between 1862 and 1863. The grist mill Stadsmolen (lit: City wind mill) was built in 1750. In 1911, it was reduced to a rump and a motor was installed. In 1995, it was bought by the municipality and restored between 1998 and 1999. It is in service on most Saturdays and grinds grain.

Axel was home to 1,226 people in 1840. In 1871, a railway station opened on the Mechelen to Terneuzen railway line. The line closed in 1951. The building was demolished in 1968.

In September 1944, Axel was the scene of fighting and destruction during the Battle of the Scheldt. On 19 September, Axel was liberated by Polish forces.

Axel was an independent municipality until 2003 when it was merged into Terneuzen.

== Notable residents ==
- E. M. Valk-Heijnsdijk (1867–1945), cookbook writer and restaurateur

== Gallery ==
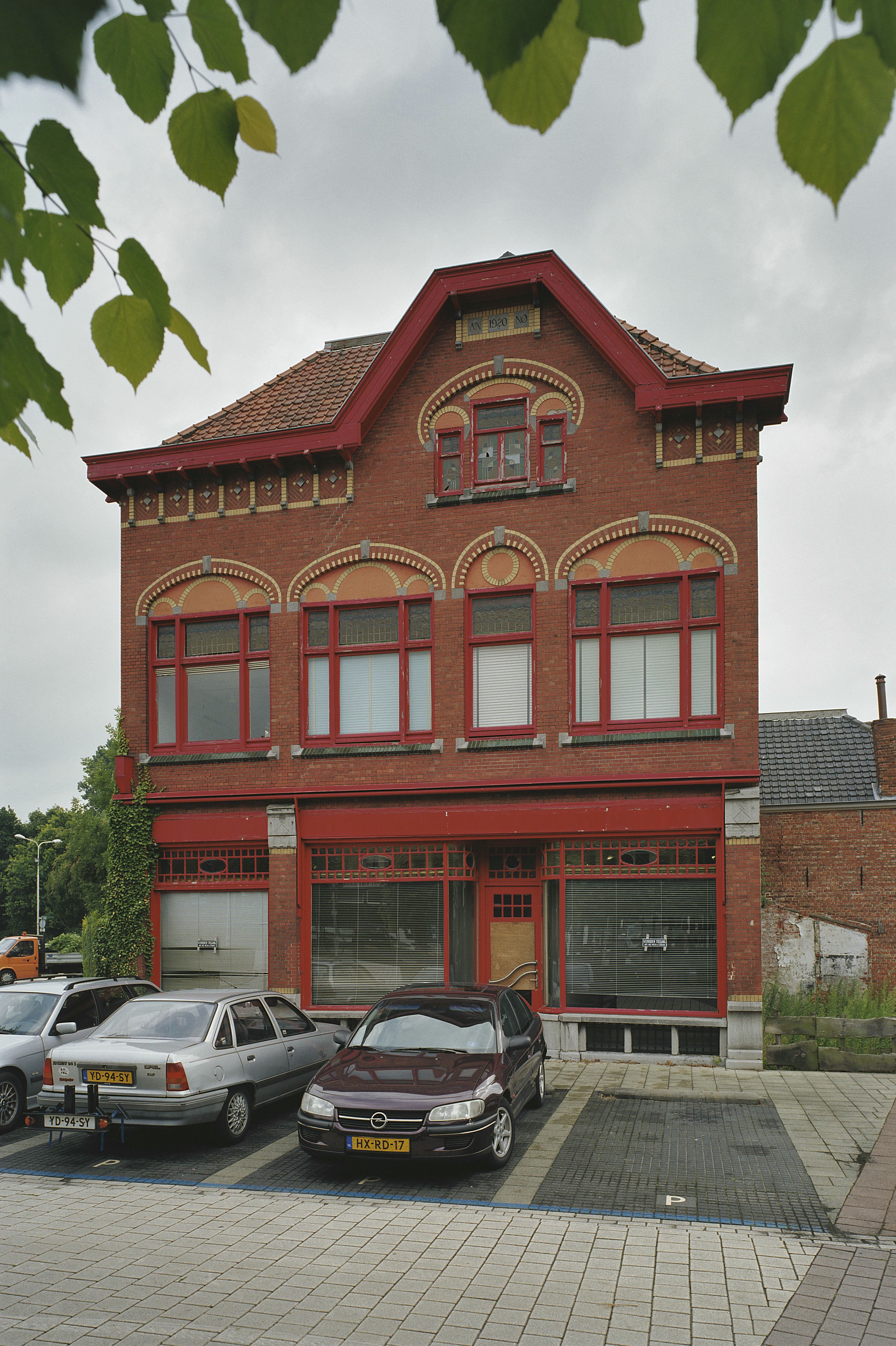
Building in Axel

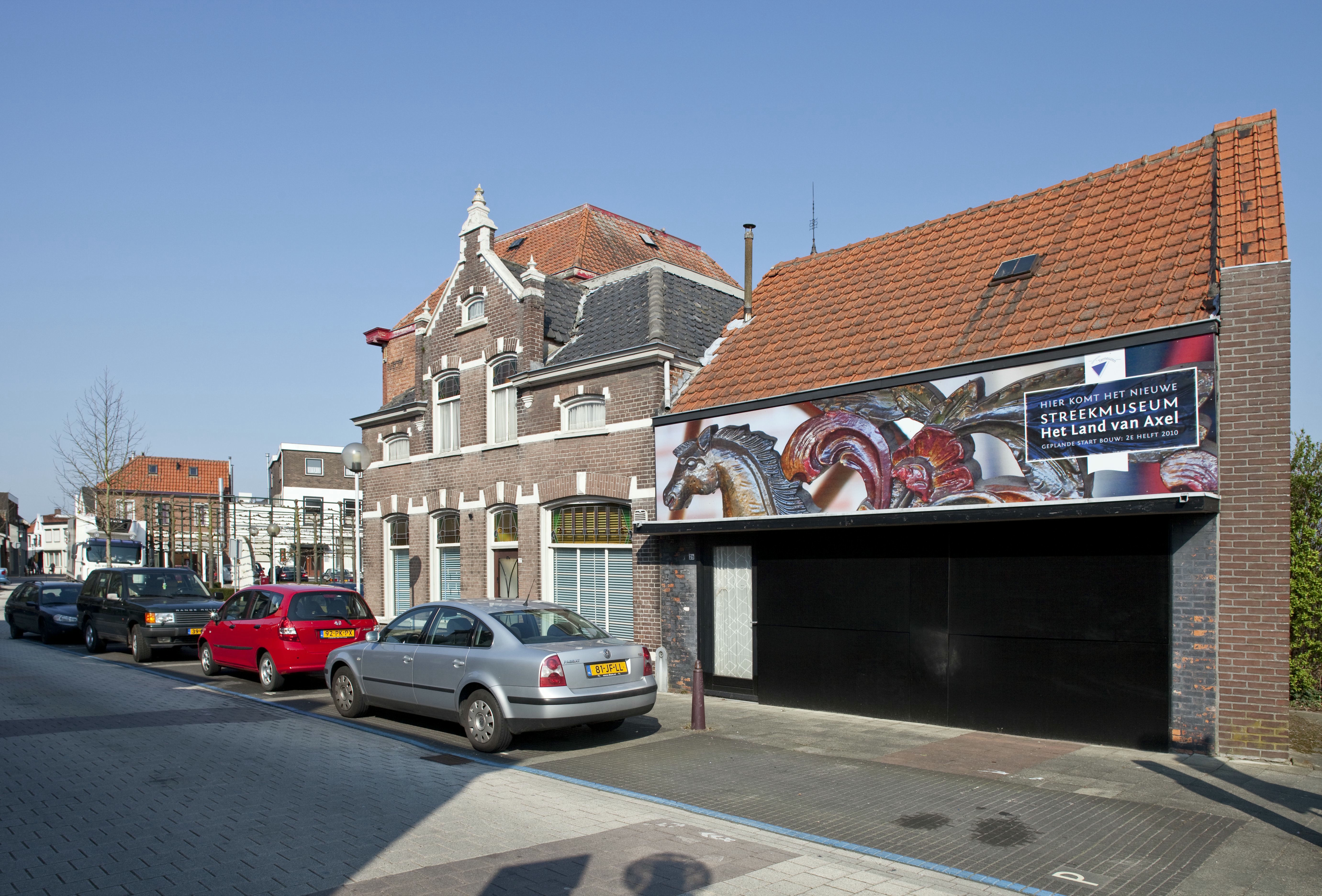
Street view

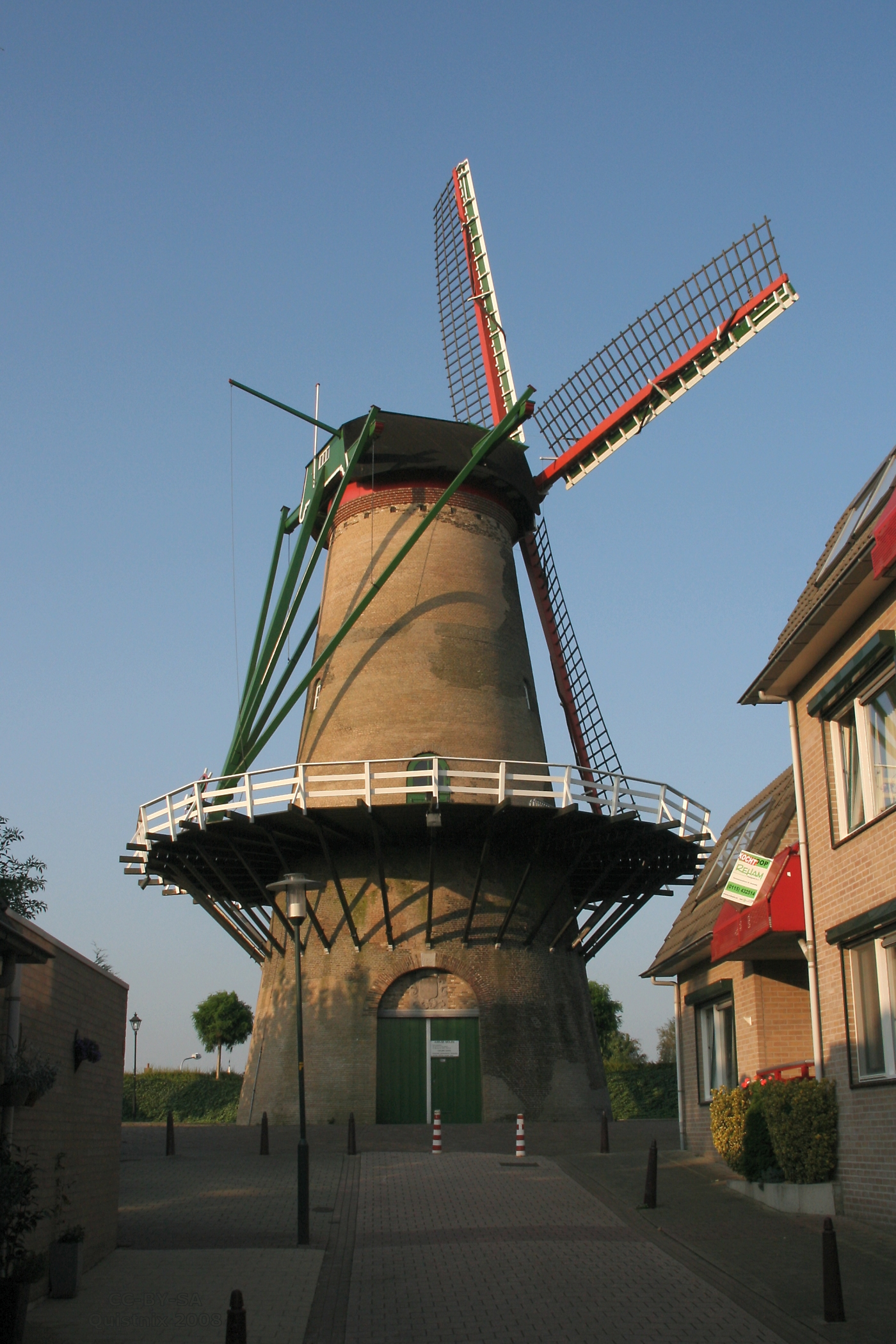
Wind mill De Stadsmolen

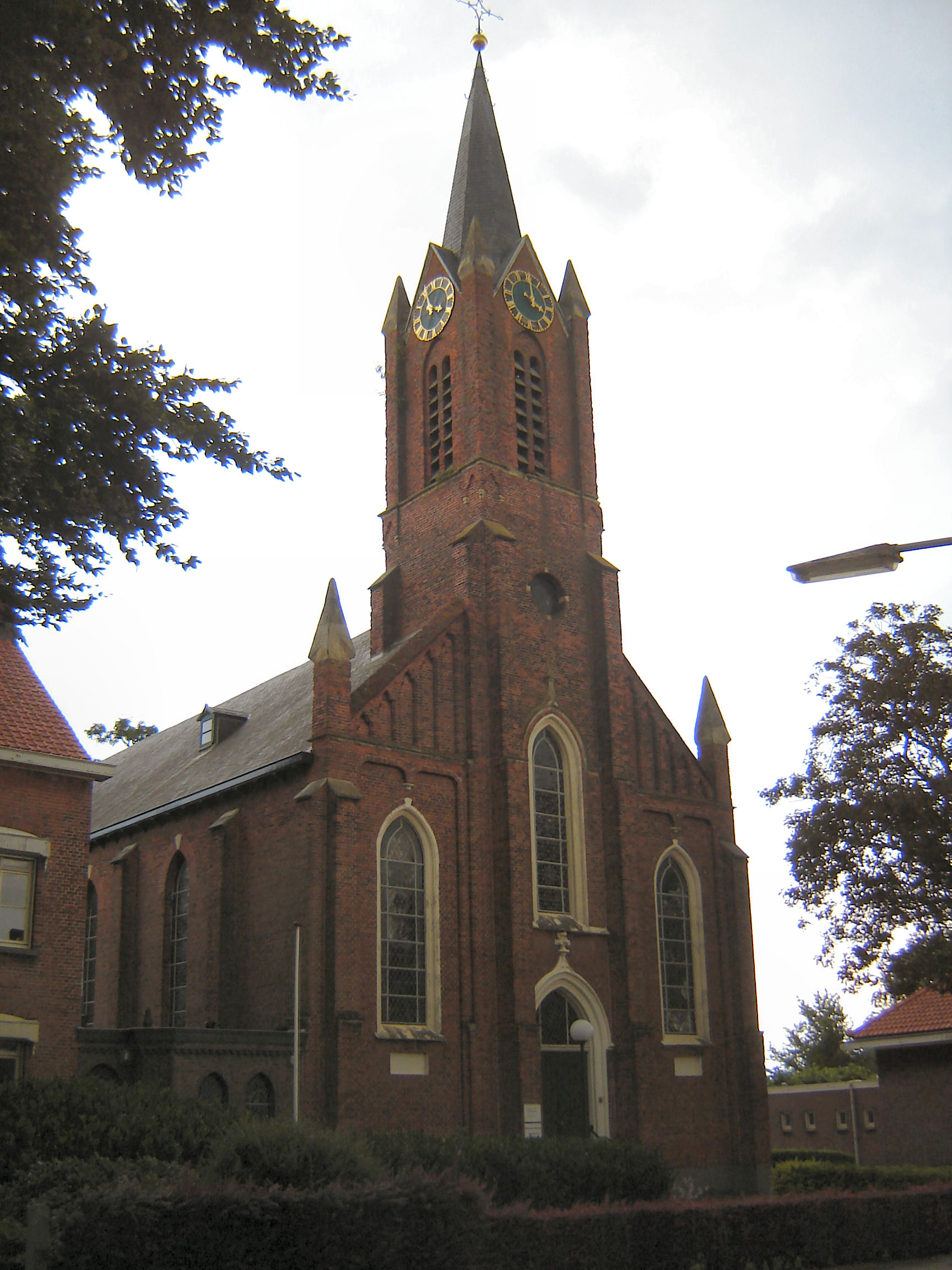
St Gregorius the Great Church
