= Sas van Gent =

- Small city
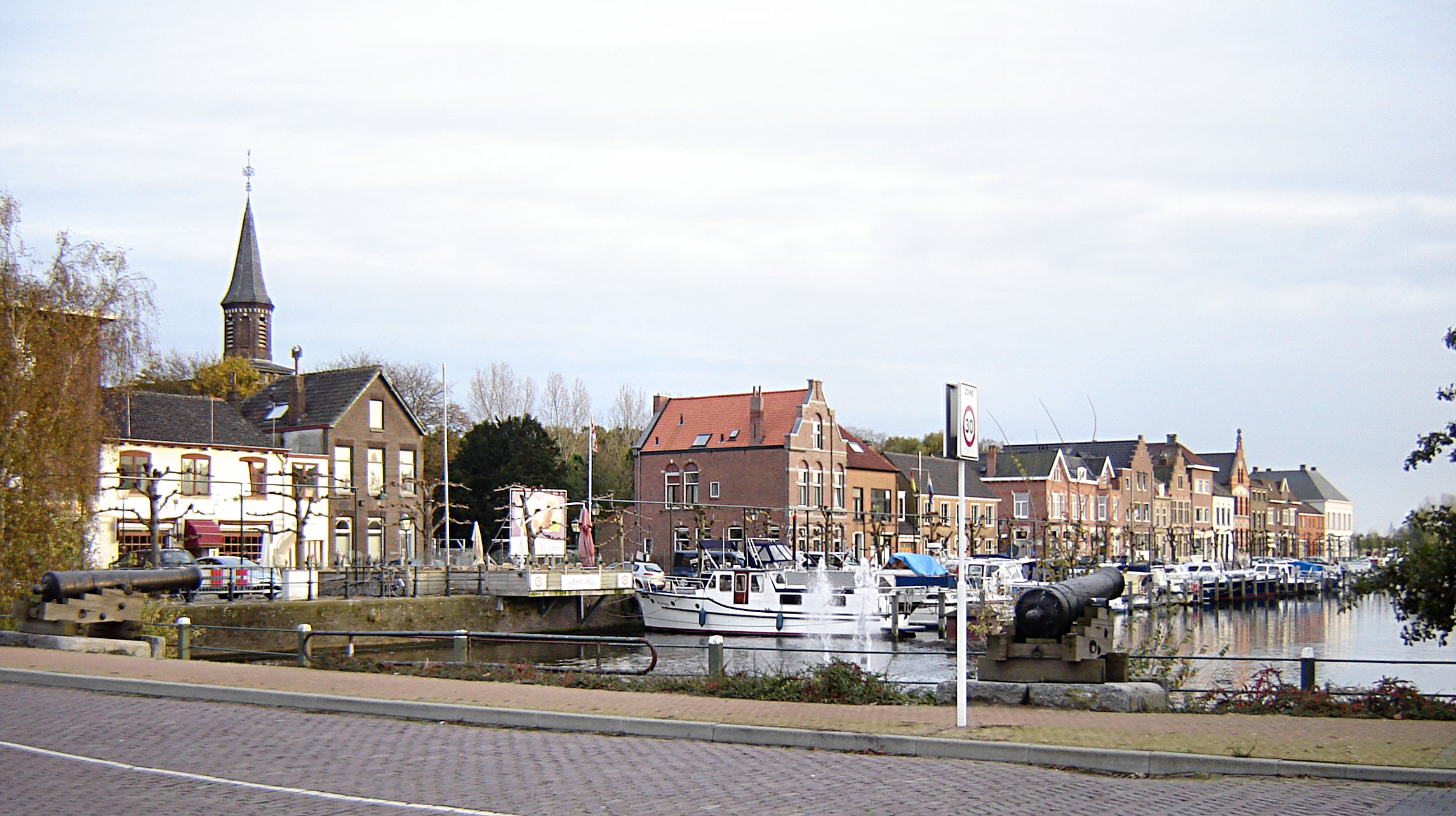
- View on Sas van Gent

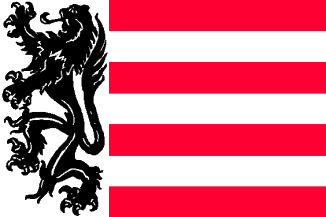
- Flag Coat of arms

- Location in the province of Zeeland in the Netherlands Sas van Gent (Netherlands)
- Coordinates: 51°13′40″N 3°47′50″E
- Country: Netherlands
- Province: Zeeland
- Municipality: Terneuzen
- Established: 1547

Area
  - Total: 18.45 km^{2} (7.12 sq mi)
- Elevation: 2.7 m (8.9 ft)

Population (2021)
  - Total: 3,780
  - Density: 205/km^{2} (531/sq mi)
- Time zone: UTC+1 (CET)
  - Summer (DST): UTC+2 (CEST)
- Postal code: 4551
- Dialing code: 0115
- Website: http://www.sasvangent.nl

Sas van Gent is a town in the Netherlands. It is located in the Dutch province of Zeeland. It is a part of the municipality of Terneuzen and lies about 30 km south of Vlissingen on the border with Belgium.

The Ghent–Terneuzen Canal passes through Sas van Gent, and at that point there was a lock in the canal. The name of the village, Sas van Gent, means sluice of Ghent, as it sits just north of the Belgian city of Ghent.

== History ==
Sas van Gent is a border fortress which was founded in 1547 when the city of Ghent received permission from Charles V, Holy Roman Emperor to dig a canal to the Westerschelde. Between 1551 and 1563, a lock was constructed north of Zelzate which was subsequently fortified. In 1583, it was captured by Spanish troops.

In 1644, it was conquered by Frederick Henry, Prince of Orange and became part of the Dutch Republic. The city was attacked by the French in 1672 but could not be taken. The French returned in 1747, and conquered the city. Between 1825 and 1827, the Ghent–Terneuzen Canal was dug, and a side canal was dug to Sas van Gent between 1882 and 1885.

The Catholic Assumption of Mary church is a three-aisled basilica like church built between 1891 and 1892 and designed by Joseph Cuypers. The church is a replacement of its 1739 predecessor.

Sas van Gent was home to 854 people in 1840. In 1869, a railway station opened on the Terneuzen to Ghent railway line. The line was closed in 1939, and the building was demolished in 1967.

The city started to industrialize in the late 19th century. As the rest of Zeeland did not have enough fresh water for sugar production, Sas van Gent got two beet sugar factories. The first was the NV Zeeuwsche Beetwortelsuikerfabriek founded in 1872. The other was a cooperative; the Eerste Nederlandsche Coöperatieve Beetwortelsuikerfabriek (ENCBS). A museum dedicated to the industrial heritage is located in the warehouses of the former ENCBS, which closed down in 1989. The other sugar factory has been closed in 1986.

Sas van Gent was a separate municipality until 2003, when it was merged with Terneuzen. The former municipality covered an area of 63.65 km² (of which 3.02 km² water).

The former municipality of Sas van Gent also included the following towns, villages and townships: Philippine, Westdorpe, Zandstraat. All are now part of Terneuzen.

== Gallery ==
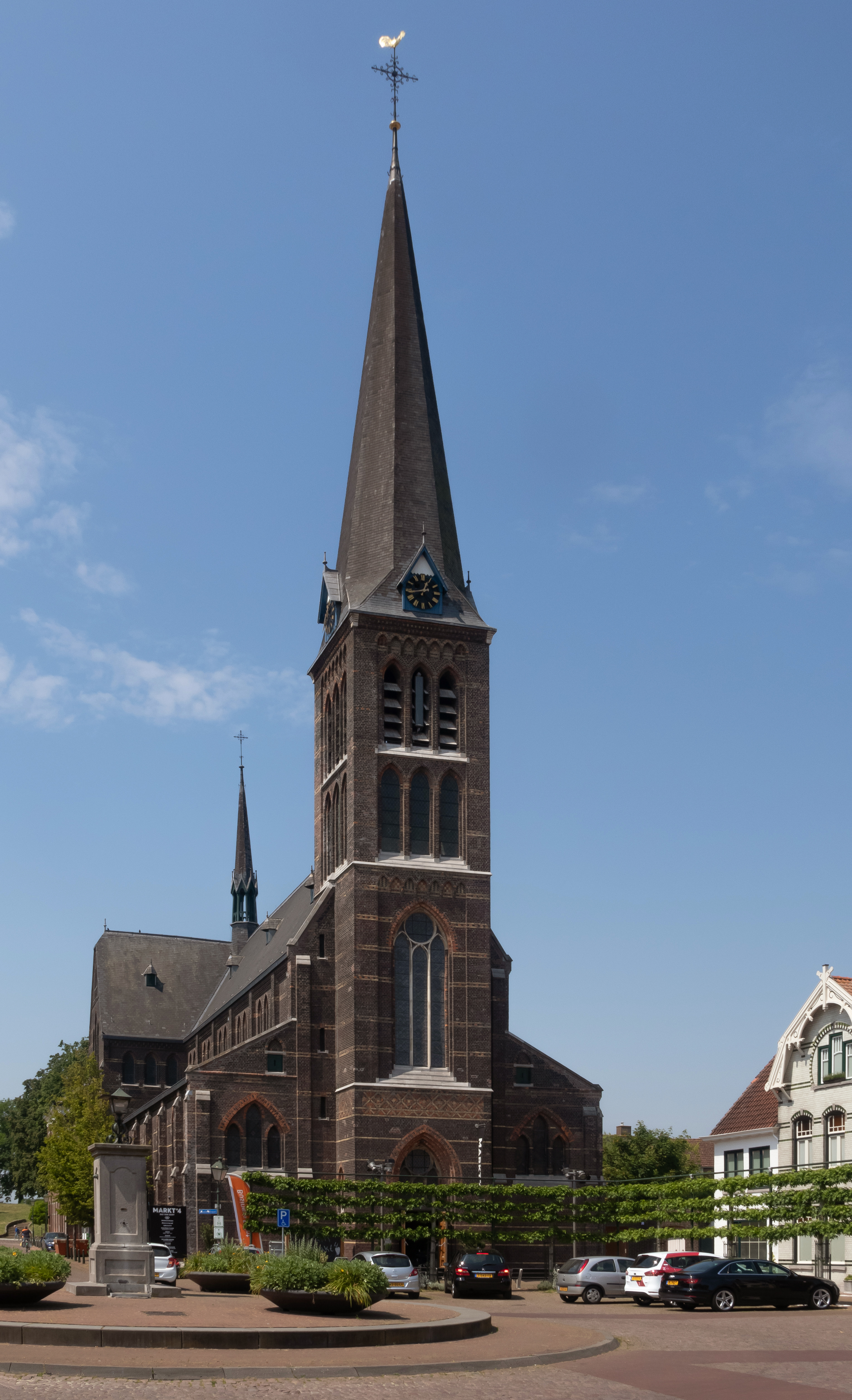
Church: the Maria Hemelvaartkerk

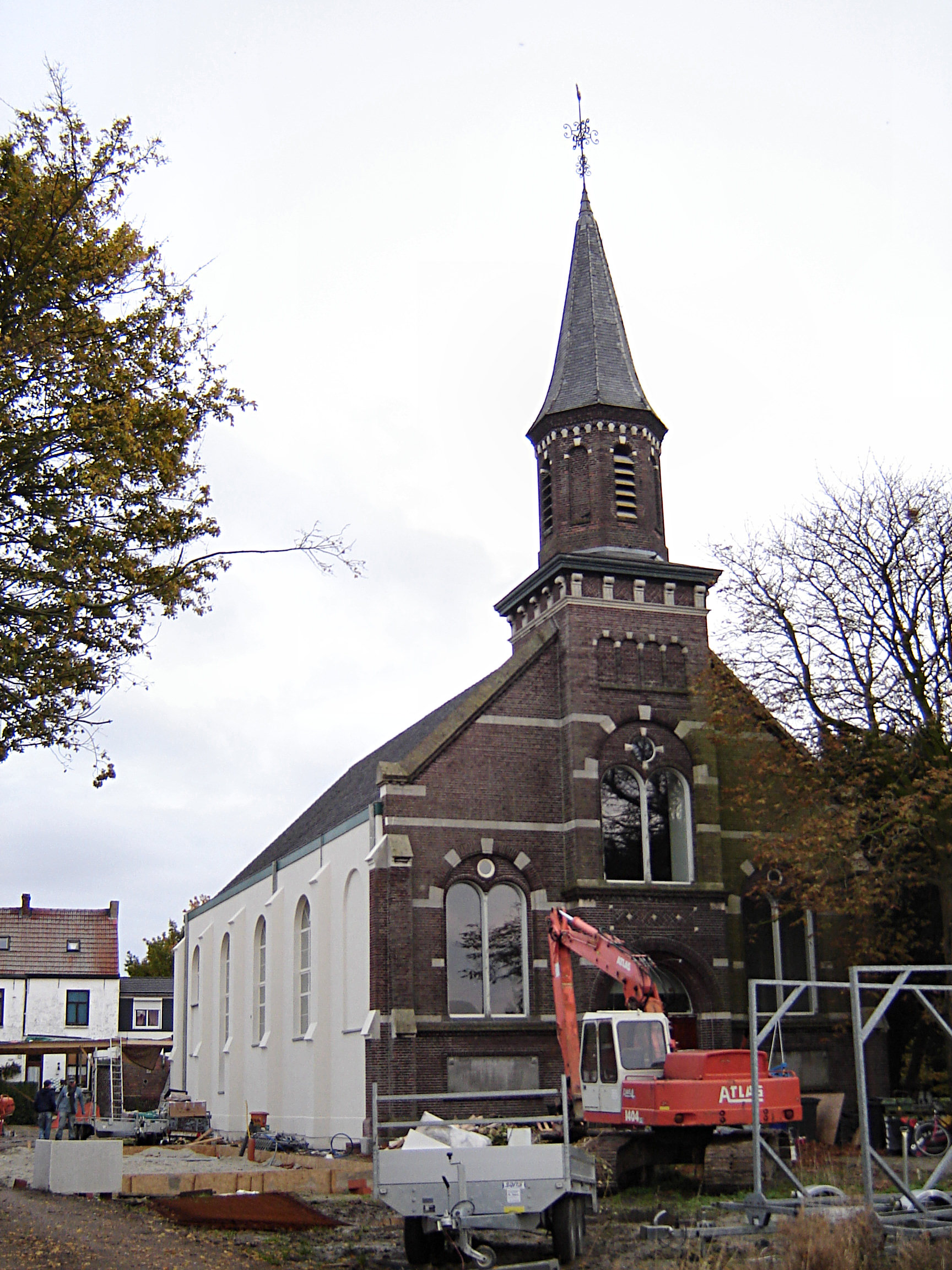
Dutch Reformed church

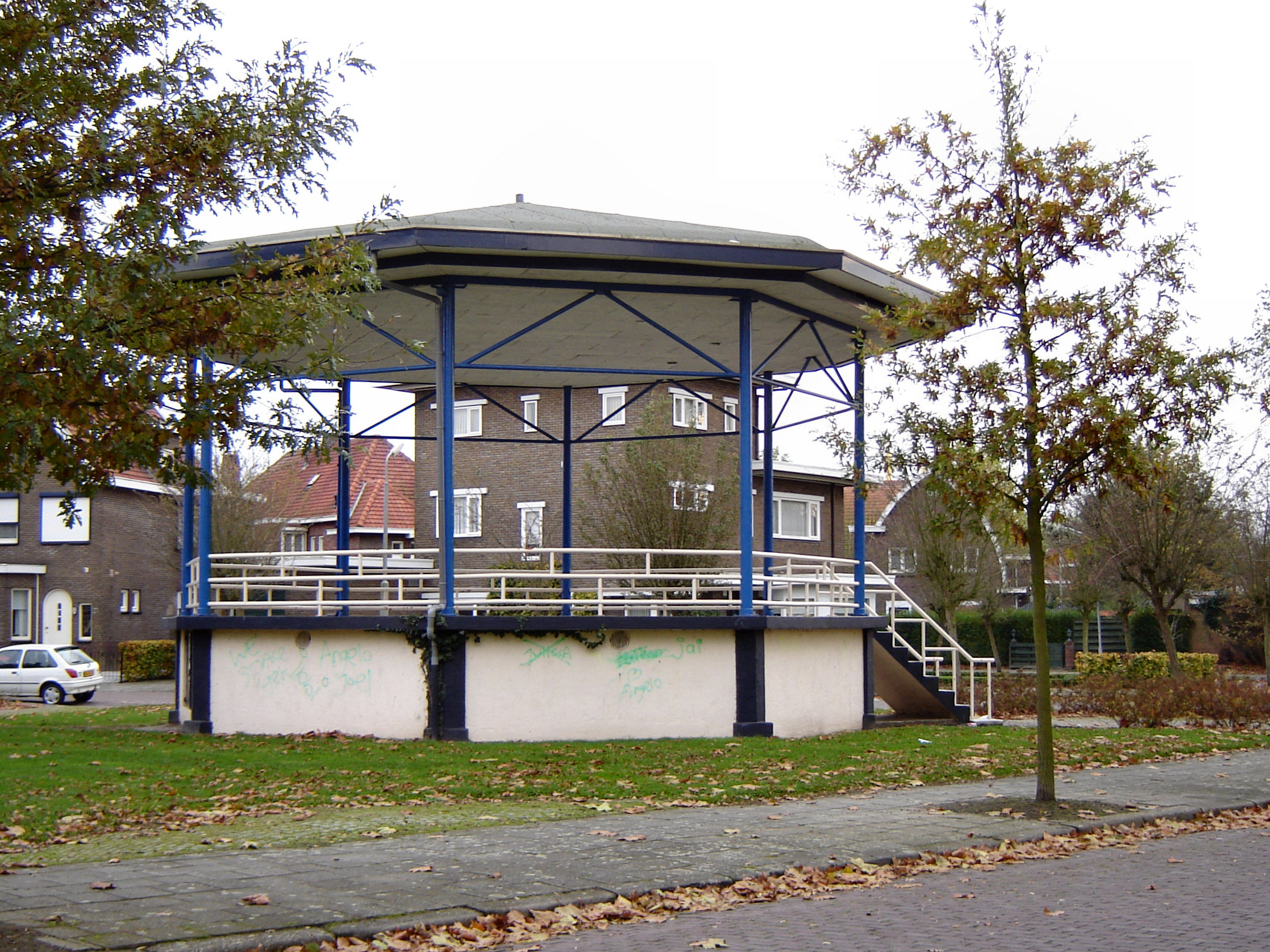
Bandstand

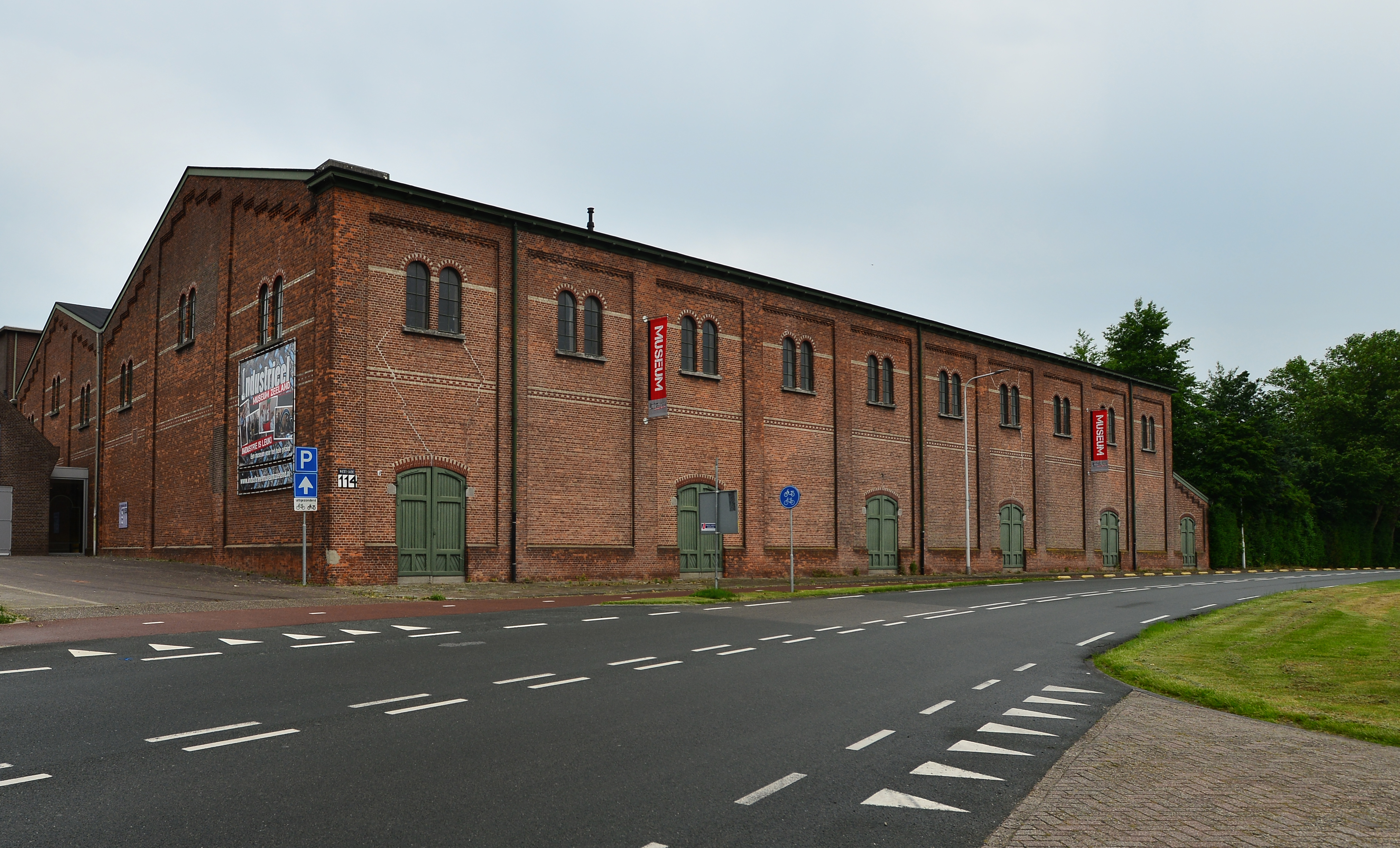
Industrial museum
