= Chronici Zelandiae =

The Chronici Zelandiae (in full: Chronici Zelandiae Libri duo auctore Jacobo Eyndio, Domino Haemstede), is a book by Dutch writer Jacob van den Eynde, better known as Jacob Eyndius. The book was published for the first time in 1634, twenty years after the author's death.

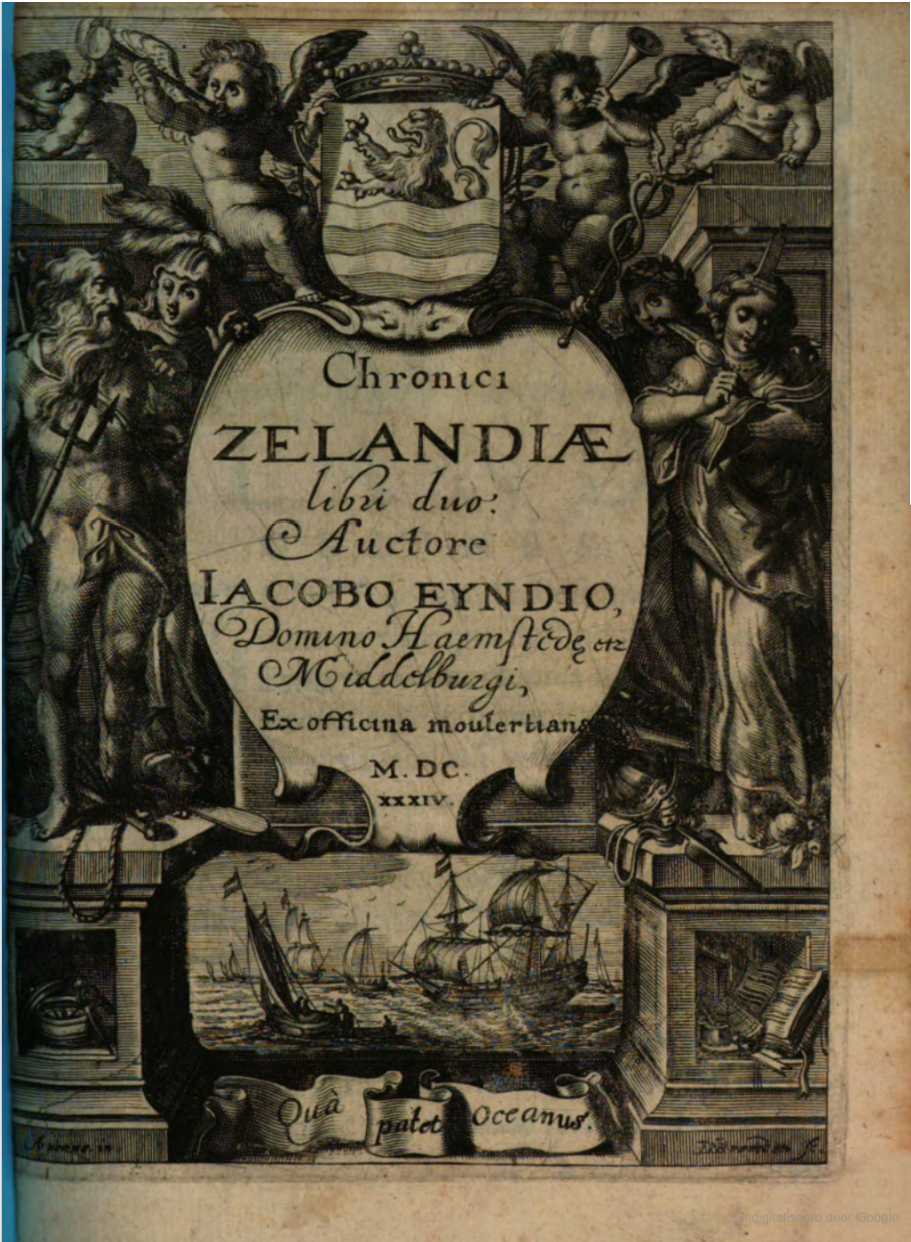
Front page of the Chronici Zelandiae (1634)

Van den Eynde wrote this book during his stay in Haamstede, on the island of Schouwen, in Zeeland, where he retired during the Twelve Years' Truce, after serving as a captain under Maurice, Prince of Orange. Van den Eynde was well versed in Latin poetry, and this book was written in Latin. The book, a chronicle of the land of Zeeland, was the first of its kind.

Van den Eynde didn't manage to finish this work before his untimely death, in 1614, and the Chronici fell into oblivion. It was later rescued by the State of Zeeland. The State saved this work and brought it back to light, publishing it under the name Chronici Zelandiae Libri duo auctore Jacobo Eyndio, Domino Haemstede.

According to Heer de Witte, this book is a "gold mine of scholarship," and, among all those written about Zeeland, "the one worth reading the most." The first book of the Chronici was translated into Dutch by Mattheus Smallegange, and inserted verbatim into his Kronijk van Zeeland.

The 1634 edition of the Chronici includes a 22-page foreword, with a dedication to the State of Zeeland and acknowledgments to the editor Jean de Brune and the printer Simon Moulert. There are also a few poems in honor of the author and a very short preface.

The first book, which ends at page 131 in the first edition, deals with the "antiquities of Zeeland." The first book is quite vague, obscure, with Eyndius presenting the reader with "but a few citations, hors d'oeuvre, conjectures and enigmas."

The author becomes more concrete in the second book, where, however, according to some authors, his style is still vague and magniloquent, and the poet seems almost to be imitating Tacitus. In this work, Eyndius debunked some myths regarding the Dutch counts. On the other hand, he also made up some myths in favor of Zeeland. For instance, Eyndius fabled that the pillars of Hercules were to be found in Zeeland.

Eyndius' work of demythologization was followed by such great names in Dutch historiography as Petrus Scriverius (1576-1660), Jan Uytenhage de Mist (1636-1668), and Simon van Leeuwen (1626-1682).
