= Jacobus Eyndius =

Dutch poet, scientist, historian and captain

Jonkheer Jacobus Eyndius
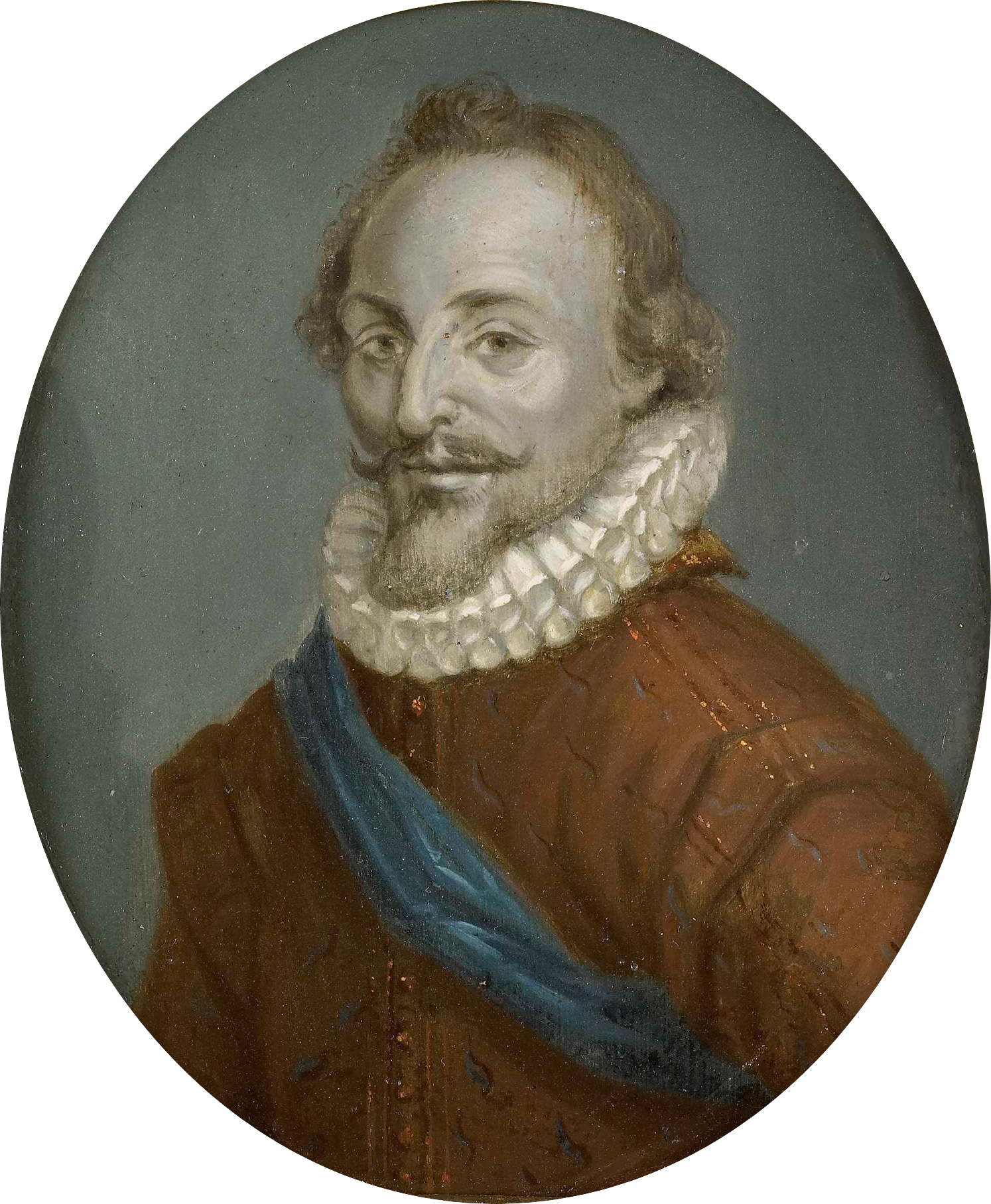
- Born: Jacob van den Eynde; 1575; Delft, Habsburg Netherlands
- Died: 11 September 1614 (aged 38–39); Haamstede, Zeeland, Netherlands
- Occupations: Poet, writer, military leader
- Spouse: Clara van Raaphorst
- Writing career
- Period: Dutch Golden Age
- Genres: Mythology, Latin poetry
- Notable works: Chronici Zelandiae; Poëmata

The Honourable Jacob van den Eynde III (1575 – 11 September 1614) also known as Jacques van den Eynde, and better known as Jacobus Eyndius, was a Dutch poet, scientist, historian, and captain. His best known work is the Chronici Zelandiae. His motto was Marte prudens pace clemens.

== Early years ==
Jacob van den Eynde was born in 1575 in Delft, the son of Jhr. Jacob van den Eynde, Governor of Woerden, and Maria van Hogendorp. In 1609, Van den Eynde married Clara/Claire van Raaphorst/Raephorst. She was the daughter of Albert de Raephorst and Agathe de Culembourg. Her mother was the daughter of a man born out of wedlock named Palensteyn, of the house of Culembourg. She had bought the lordship of Haamstede, on the island of Schouwen, from the lord of Cruyningen. Thus, Van den Eynde acquired the lordship of Hamstede from his wife through their marriage. After his untimely death, she remarried to Jacob de Witte, who consequently inherited the lordship, since Van den Eydne had no children.

== Military career ==
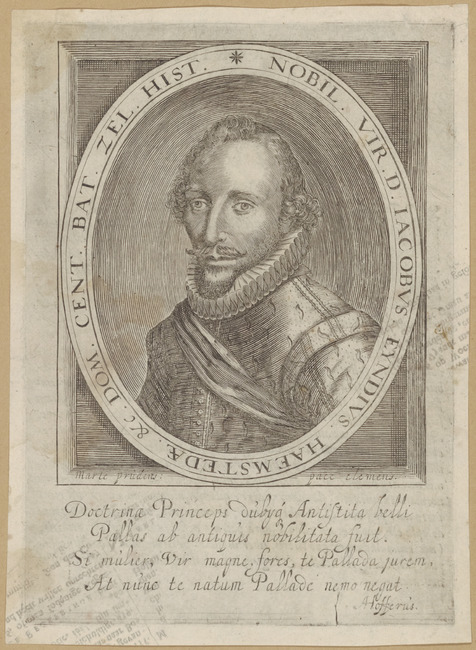
Jacob van den Eynde

Upon finishing his studies, he pursued a military career and was captain of an infantry regiment at the service of Maurice, Prince of Orange. He distinguished himself in this position. His military career didn't prevent him from cultivating his passion for the letters. Van den Eynde's father Jacob, Governour of Woerden, had himself been an author of poetry in Latin.

In order to dedicate himself wholly to writing, Van den Eynde interrupted his military career. There is uncertainty on when he did so, but he probably left on the occasion of the Twelve Years' Truce.

== Poetry ==
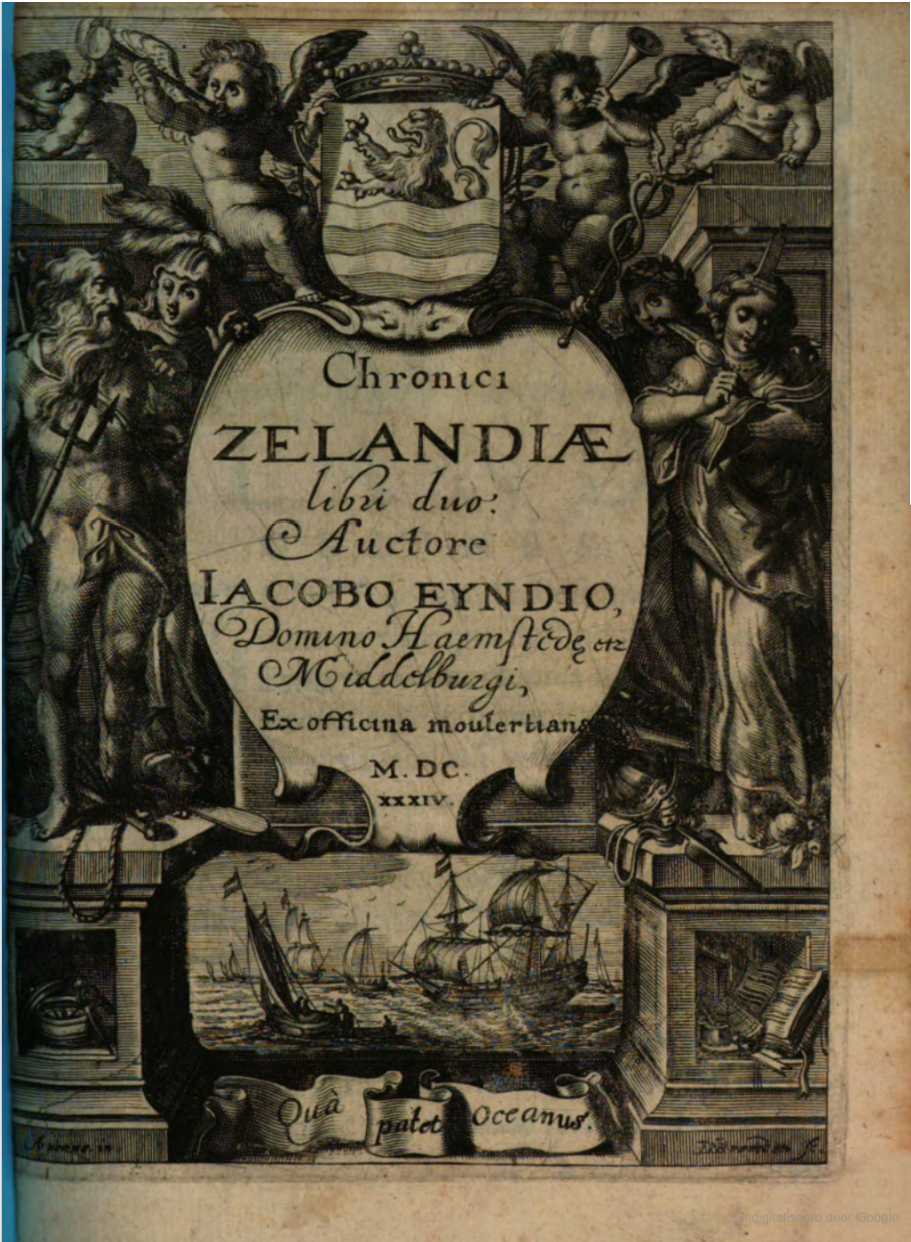
Front page of the Chronici Zelandiae (1634)

Eyndius was well versed in poetry. His works show his skills in the field of letters, especially Latin poetry. He also mastered Greek, and the Antiquité profane. His best known book of poetry is the Poëmata. This collection of poems is divided into six sections, namely: Nassovica; Belli Flandrici libri duo; Mars exul.; Senatus Convivalis; Epicedium in acerbum Jani Dousae sunus; Nugarum liber unus.

The first two books are in heroic verse. In 1614, Adrien Hoffer praised them thusly:

Quid rear? armatusne in te spiravit Apollo,
Ac docuit quo sint bella gerenda modo?
An studiis, Eyndii, Mavors operatur honestits,
Suggesit quo sint bella canenda pede?

The last book (Nugarum liber unus) of the Poëmata was later reprinted with some pieces by Daniël Heinsius. Ole Borch commented on Van den Eynde's poems: Faverunt & Musae Jacobo Eyndio, Centurioni Batavo, cujus Bellum Flandricum [...] non parum gratiae habet: durior ejusdem Mars exul: venustiores Elegi, nec adeo in Nugis nugatur.

== Works ==
During his stay in Haamstede, Eyndius wrote two books in Latin: a chronicle of Zeeland, which was the first of its kind. The unfinished work fell into oblivion after Van den Eynde's death, but was later rescued by the State of Zeeland. The State brought this work back to light by publishing it under the name of Chronici Zelandiae Libri duo auctore Jacobo Eyndio, Domino Haemstede. According to the 19th-century biographer Samuel de Wind, this work is a "gold mine of scholarship," and, among all those written on Zeeland, "the one worth reading the most." The first book of the Chronici was translated into Dutch by Mattheus Smallegange, and inserted verbatim into his Kronijk van Zeeland.

The 1634 edition of the Chronici includes a 22-page foreword, with a dedication to the State of Zeeland and acknowledgments to the editor Jean de Brune and the printer Simon Moulert; a few poems in honor of the author, and a very short preface. The first book, which ends at page 131 in the first edition, deals with the "antiquities of Zeeland." The first book is very poetical, esoteric, seldom glossing the facts, and Eyndius presents the reader with "but a few citations, hors d'oeuvre, conjectures, and enigmas." He is more concrete in the second book, where, however, his style is still "vague and harsh," and the author seems to be imitating Tacitus. In this work, Eyndius claimed to debunk some myths regarding the Dutch counts. On the other hand, he also made up some myths for Zeeland, such as that the pillars of Hercules were to be found there. Eyndius' work of demythologization was overshadowed by such great names in Dutch historiography as Petrus Scriverius (1576-1660), and Simon van Leeuwen (1626-1682).

Van den Eynde's Saltationibus Veterum is dedicated to Joseph Scaliger. The work seems to have been included by Johann Georg Graevius in his Trésor des antiquités romaines.

- Poëmata (1611)
- Chronici Zelandiae libri duo (1634)
- De Saltationibus Veterum
- Hydropyricon liber

== Legacy ==
Eyndius' works were rescued by the State of Zeeland, and published twenty years after his death. His chronicle of Zeeland has been praised as the best of its kind. The work inspired Mattheus Smallegange, who continued it in his Nieuwe Cronyk van Zeeland.
