= Adriaan van Schrieck =

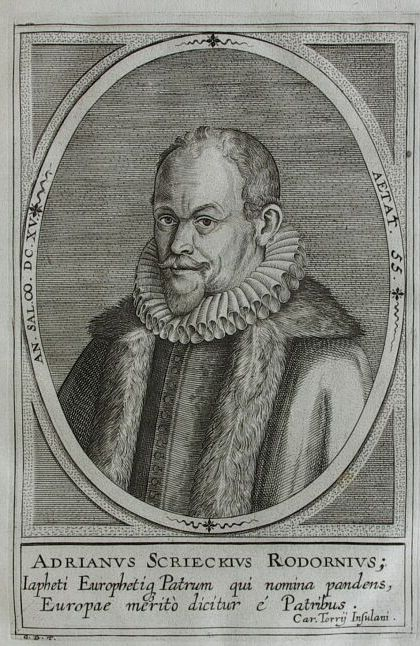
- By Guillaume du Tielt, 1614
- Born: 1560; Bruges, Flanders, Habsburg Netherlands
- Died: 1621 (aged 60–61); Ypres, Flanders, Habsburg Netherlands
- Occupation: Civil servant
- Known for: Prehistory, History, Linguistics

Adriaan van Schrieck (Bruges, 26 December 1560 – Ypres, 26 December 1621), lord of Rodorne, was a Flemish office holder and humanist, known for his historical and linguistic work. He is also known by his Latin name, Adrianus Schrieckius.

== Life ==
Adriaan van Schrieck was born in Bruges. After his earliest education in his native city, he attended the University of Paris to study philosophy and law. There he came into contact with famous people such as the French statesman and Chancellor of the Kingdom of Navarre, Henri de Mesmes, and François Pithou.

Upon return to his homeland, he met Gerard Horne, count of Baucigny, and Nicolas de Montmorency, count of Estaires, by whose offices he was appointed bailiff of Cassel, Estaires, La Bassée and Loker. Later he was appointed councillor to the Archdukes Albert and Isabella. Finally, between 1609 and 1619 he was chancellor of the city of Ypres, where he spent his last years until he died of a stroke in December 1621.

In his spare time he devoted himself to historical research, supported by a network of humanist scholars in the Habsburg Netherlands and the Dutch Republic that included Nicolaas Cromhout, Erycius Puteanus and Josse de Rycke (nl). Schrieck's historical works include the history of Ypres and the prehistory of Europe.

== Bibliography ==
- Schrieck, Adriaen van (1614). Van t'Beghin der eerster Volcken van Europen, in sonderheyt van den oorspronck ende Saecken der Neder-Landren (in Dutch). François Bellet.
- Scrieckius, Adrianus (1615). Monitorum secundorum libri V. : quibus originum rerumque Celticarum et Belgicarum opus suum nuper editum, altius et auctiùs è fontibus Hebraicis, ipsâque rerum origine deducit, probat, firmatque : ad Teutones, Belgas, Gallos, Italos, Iberos, Britannos, Danos, et Aquilonares : admirandae Celtarum antiquitatis et hactenus inauditae et animadversae observationis de vera et falsa origine monimentum sive Europa rediviva (in Latin). Ypris Flandrorum: ex officina typographica Francisci Belletti.
- Scrieckius, Adrianus (1620). Adversariorum libri IIII : his argumentis : linguam hebraicam esse divinam et primogeniam : linguam teutonicam esse secundam, et dialecto tantùm ab hebraea distare : apologia pro divo Hieronymo : metrum hebraicum, post d. Hieronymum ignoratum, nunc repertum : de vulgaribus hebraizantium, historicorum, geographorum, et criticorum, circa origines, erroribus (in Latin). Ex officina Francisci typographica Belletti, Ipris Flandrorum.

== Ancestors ==
16. Ioannes van Scrieck; °Westdorpe - †Zuiddorpe fled the flood of 1421
8. Simon van Scrieck; °Zuiddorpe - †Zuiddorpe soldier under Philip the Good
17. Adriana Stelandia
4. Ioannes van Scrieck; °Zuiddorpe - †Zuiddorpe destitute by flooding
2. Petrus van Scrieck; °Zuiddorpe - †Bruges koopman die op Noorwegen voer
1. Adrianus van Scrieck; °Bruges - †Ypres civil servant, historian, Lord of Rodorne
6. Ioannes
3. Cornelia Maestera; niece of bishop Pieter de Corte (nl)

This ancestry is based on the biography by Leonardus Neytsius (wikisource), with Van Schrieck's Monita from 1615. Neytsius, who was a canon of St. Donatian's Cathedral in Bruges, had forwarded the biography on 1 May 1613 in a recommendation letter to the bishop of Ypres, Jan de Visschere.
