= The New Chronicles of Zeeland =

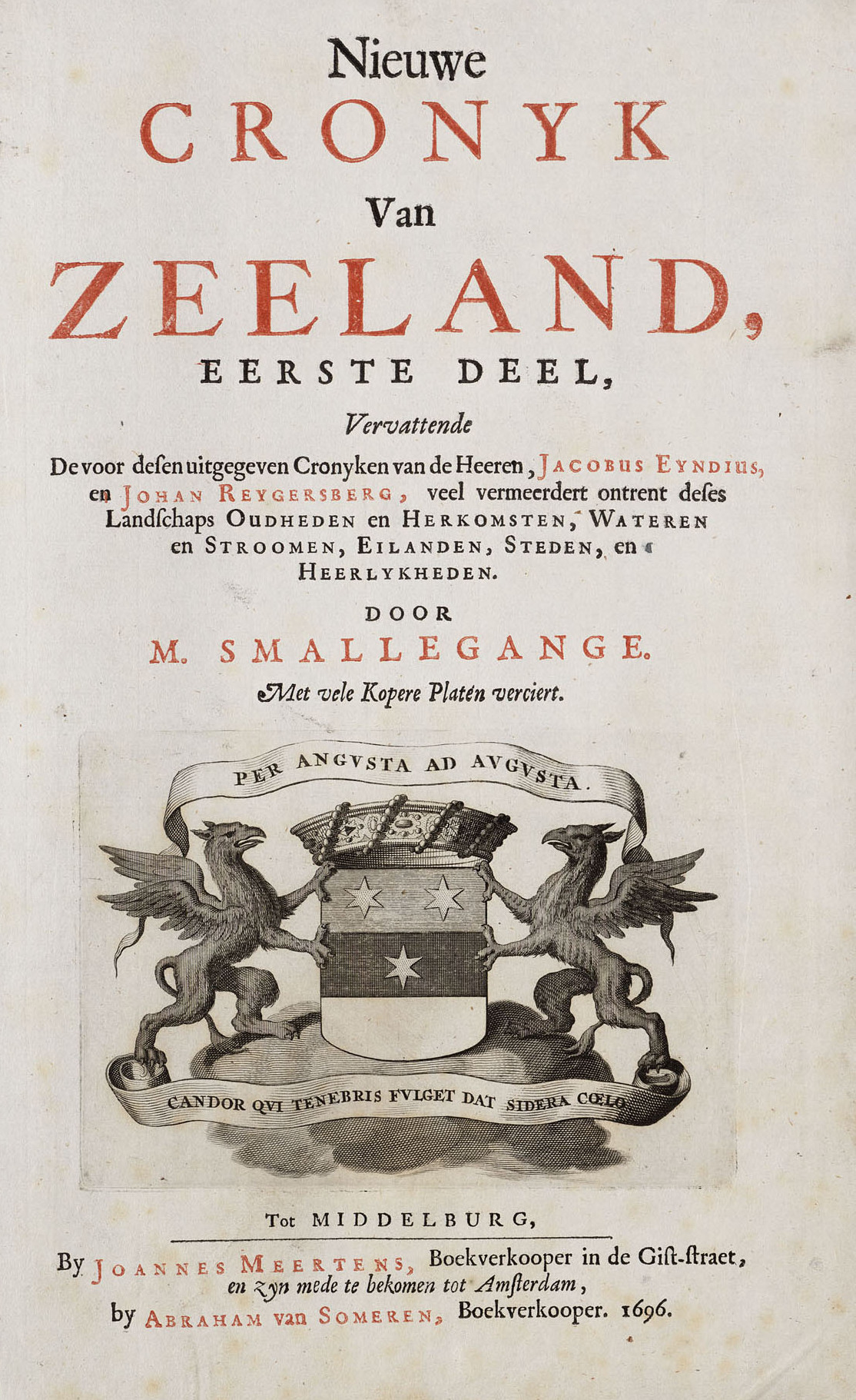
Title page of New Chronicles of Zeeland

The New Chronicles of Zeeland (Dutch: Nieuwe Cronyk Van Zeeland) is a reference work published in 1700 by the historian Mattheus Smallegange (1624 – 1710).

It is an extensive (almost 800-page long), illustrated description of Zeeland. The Cronyk was completed in 1696, but first appeared in 1700. The years of delay were caused by disagreements between the Zeeland cities and the States of Zeeland (the regional government).

This book is a summary and continuation of other chronicles published earlier by Jacobus Eyndius (Chronici Zelandiae), Johan Reygersberg and Marcus Zuerius van Boxhorn. Smallegange copied verbatim parts of the older chronicles whenever he could make use of them. He himself collected material about the history of Zeeland. This research cost him time and money, but he received financial support from the States of Zeeland. Much was also taken from the works of Marcus Zuerius van Boxhorn and Olivier de Wree.

The book deals with the political and military history of Zeeland, as well as its economy, geography and polity. Smallegange deals with all towns, fiefdoms, and a number of characters and institutions of Zeeland. The book is illustrated with maps, city and harbor views and images of buildings and country estates. Everything expresses the prosperity and wealth of the Zeeland elite of that time.

== Background and publishing ==
The book was printed by the Middelburg printer Johannes Meertens. Meertens was a representative of the flourishing printing and book trade in Middelburg in the 17th century. By the end of the 16th century, the city had already attracted a large number of book printers from the Southern Netherlands. Publishers and printers did not appear in other cities in Zeeland until after 1600.

The city councils were in need of people skilled in printmaking. The new political situation, in which Zeeland was a sovereign region and the cities were quite powerful, made it necessary to issue numerous printed placards and ordinances. The introduction of the Reformed faith, too, generated an increase in demand, what with the need for practical religious manuals such as the Bible and the psalm books.

In addition, there was a demand for charts, especially for the flourishing sea shipping industry. The Visscher-Roman atlas from 1655 is the best known example thereof. The production of atlases, incidentally, soon shifted to Amsterdam, in the 17th century. Middelburg was the undisputed center of the printing press in Zeeland and its publishing houses also had a reputation that extended beyond Zeeland. Between 1550 and 1700, more than 1,300 books were published and printed in the Zeelandic capital. The peak was in the 1660s. After that, the number of books printed in Middelburg started to fall rapidly. Printers and booksellers from other major Dutch cities outnumbered the Middelburgers. The Cronyk was published when the publishing profession in Middelburg was already in decline. Nevertheless, the book is still an important work for this province.

== Sequel ==
A second part was foreseen, but the project never materialized. Smallegange summarized this in a short Besluyt, which appeared in 1704. He did write other books, however, including a number of genealogies and translations.

== Literature ==
- Geschiedenis van Zeeland, deel 2: 1550–1700, Zwolle/Utrecht 2012, 199–295
- Arno Neele e.a., Religie en cultuur, in: Paul Brusse en Wijnand Mijnhardt (red.)
- P.J. Verkruijsse, Mattheus Smallegange (1624–1710) en zijn cronyk van Zeeland, Schiedam 1977.
- S. de Wind; Iets over Mattheüs Smallegange en zijne kronijk van Zeeland. Uit: Nehallenia, dl.1 P. 35–74 (1849)
- P.J. Verkruijsse; Rumoer rond een zeventiende-eeuws ziekbed: of, de vier versies van Mattheus Smalleganges sinnebeeld met elkaar vergeleken (Amsterdam) (1967)
- P.J. Verkruijsse; Mattheus Smallegange (1624–1710): Zeeuwse historicus, genealoog en vertaler. Descriptieve persoonsbibliografie (1983)

== See also ==
- nl:Nieuwe Cronyk van Zeeland, article on the native Dutch Wikipedia
