= Willem Schrijver =

Dutch patrician and politician

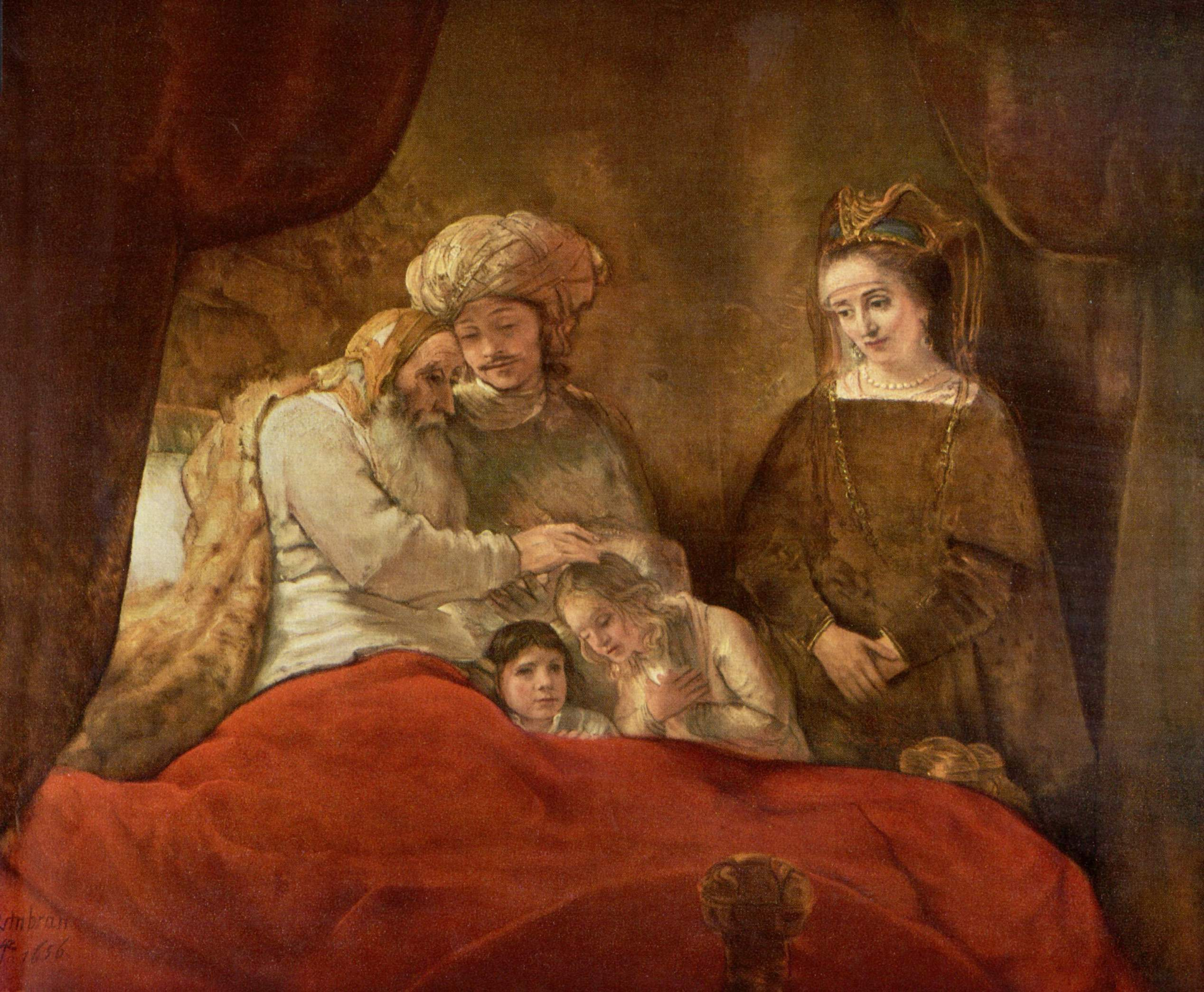
Jacob Blessing the Sons of Joseph by Rembrandt, 1656, probably with portraits of Willem Schrijver, his father, wife and sons, as biblical characters

Willem Schrijver (Leiden, 1608 – Amsterdam, October 17, 1661) was a Dutch patrician and politician of the Dutch Golden Age.

== Biography ==
Willem was born in the city of Leiden, the son of the important philologist Pieter Hendricksz Schrijver, aka Petrus Scriverius, and his wife Anna van der Aar. Willem grew up in Amsterdam and held various positions in the city, becoming a lieutenant in the citizen guard in 1651 and a captain in 1653. In 1655, he became commissioner of the city of Amsterdam, and between 1656 and the year of his death in 1661 he was part of the Vroedschap. Between 1658 and also 1661, he was a councilor to the Admiraliteit van West-Friesland en het Noorderkwartier.

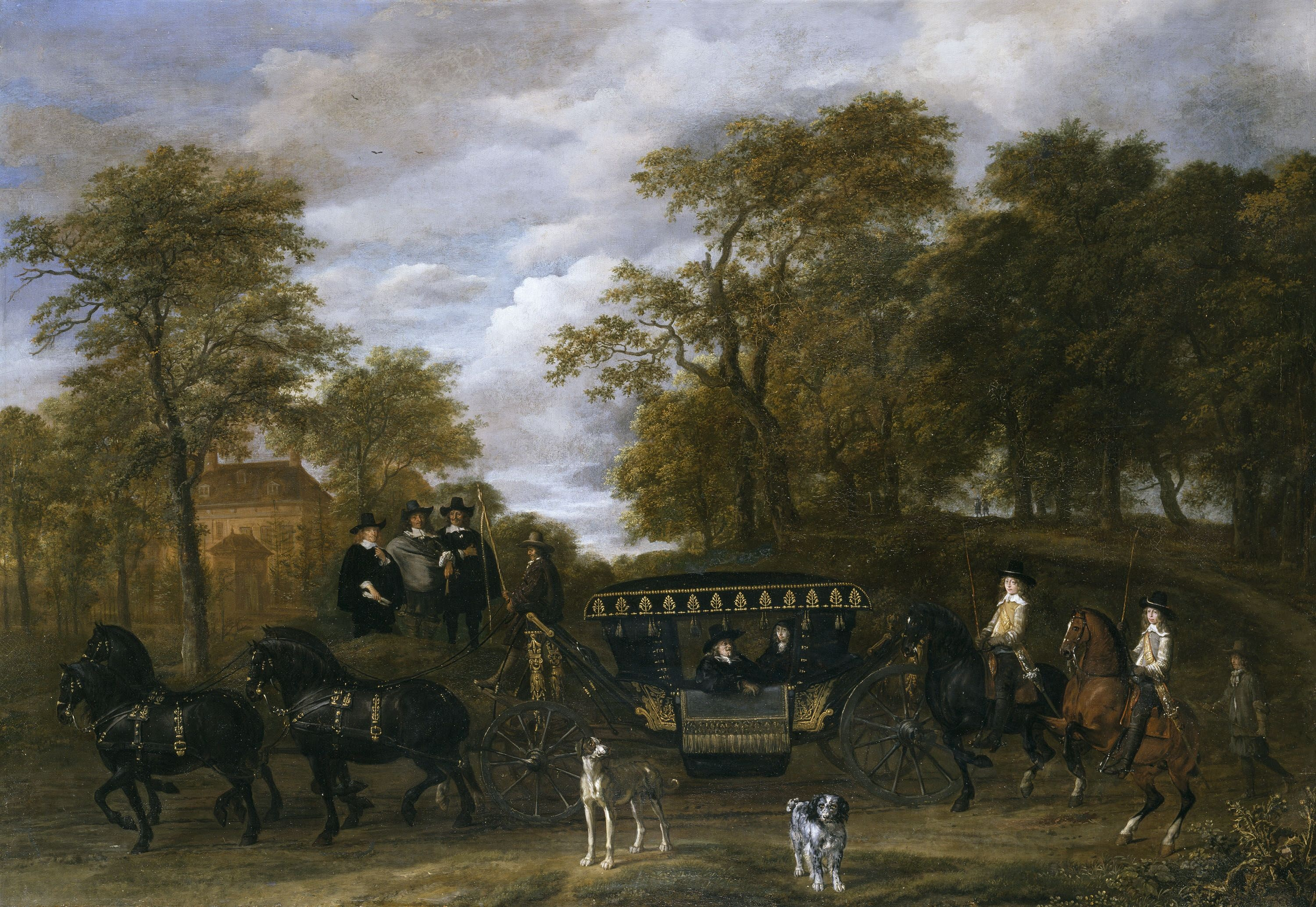
Cornelis de Graeff at Soestdijk, painted by Thomas de Keyser and Jacob van Ruisdael (1656-1660)

In 1645, Willem married the extremely wealthy patrician daughter Wendela de Graeff, daughter of burgomaster Jacob Dircksz de Graeff and Aaltje Boelens Loen and widow of Pieter van Papenbroek. Due to this marriage he became a brother-in-law to statesman and Amsterdam burgomaster Cornelis de Graeff and uncle by marriage of Grand pensionary Johan de Witt. The couple had the son Willem Schrijver II (1651–1673), who married Margaretha Six (1653–1704). He was ranked 57 among the richest people of the Golden Age with a sum of 580,000 guilders. The family of Willem and Wendela lived in a town house on the Herengracht.

In 1655/56, Willem commissioned Rembrandt the painting Jacob Blessing the Sons of Joseph, which depicts his father Petrus, himself (as Joseph) with his wife Wendela and their two sons from her first and second marriage as biblical characters. Around 1660, Willem was also painted at The Arrival of Cornelis de Graeff and Members of His Family at Soestdijk, His Country Estate by Thomas de Keyser and Jacob van Ruisdael. Alongside his brothers-in-law Pieter Trip and Andries de Graeff, he is the first of the three figures standing on the roadside to the right of center.

== Source ==
- Johan Engelbert Elias, De Vroedschap van Amsterdam, 1578–1795, Deel 1, p 498
