= Jacob Blessing the Sons of Joseph (Rembrandt) =

1656 painting by Rembrandt

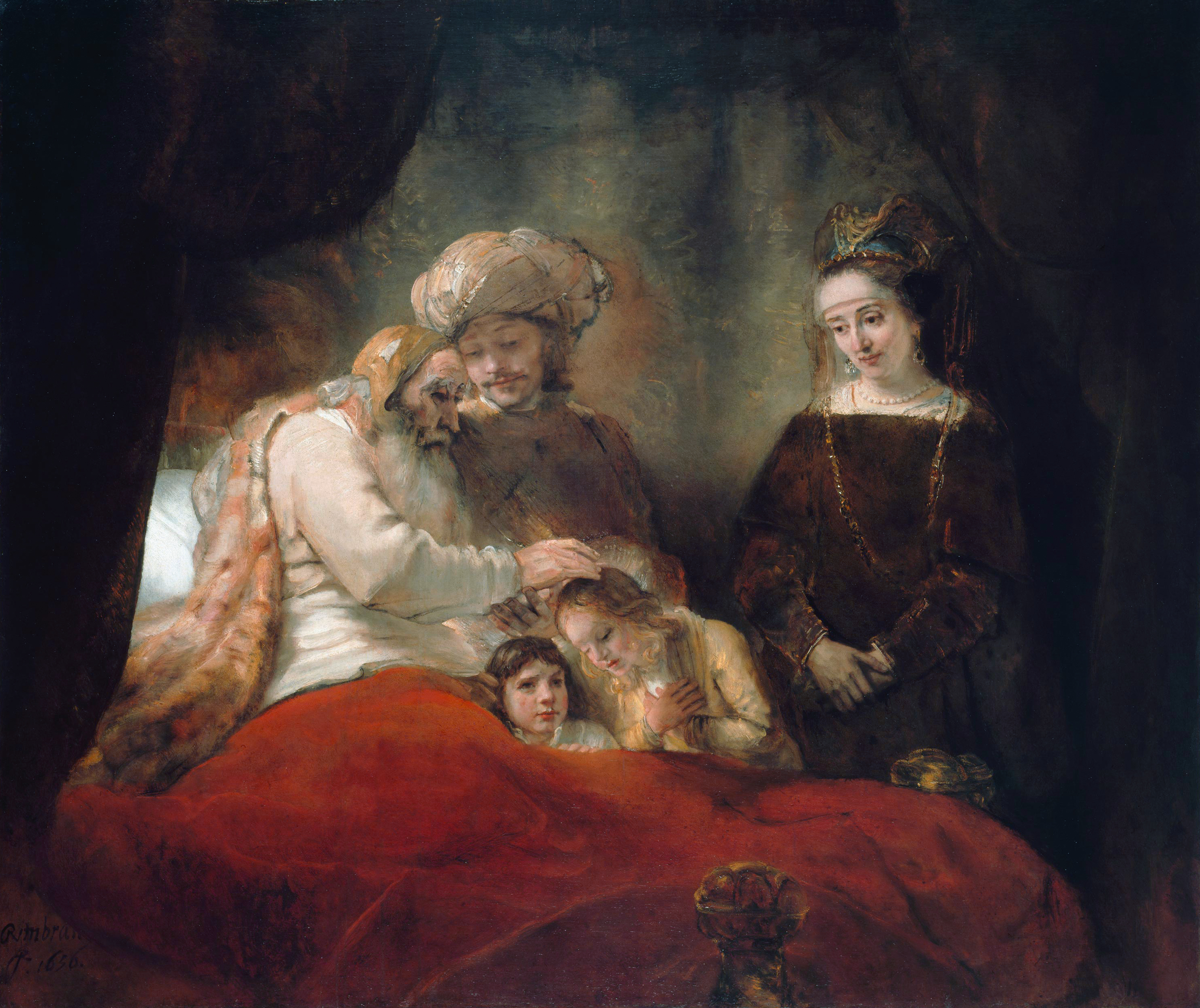
- Artist: Rembrandt
- Year: 1656
- Medium: Oil on canvas
- Dimensions: 173 cm × 209 cm (68 in × 82 in)
- Location: Schloss Wilhelmshöhe, Kassel, Hesse, Germany

Jacob Blessing the Sons of Joseph is a 1656 oil painting by Dutch artist Rembrandt van Rijn, now in the Gemäldegalerie Alte Meister in Kassel, Germany. It is said to have almost "a sculptural surface with a translucent glaze over paint".

The painting was commissioned by the Amsterdam patrician Willem Schrijver, and according to the Rembrandt scholar Gary Schwartz includes portraits of his family, as the biblical characters. Jacob is his father Petrus Scriverius, the Latinised form of Peter Schrijver (1576–1660), an important Dutch scholar who had gone blind by 1650. Joseph is the commissioner Willem Schrijver, and his young sons are two of his sons. The subject in art does not usually include the minor biblical figure of Joseph's wife Asenath, but adding her allowed a portrait of Willem's wife Wendela de Graeff. The portrait historié ("historicized portrait") was used by some Dutch Golden Age painters, notably Jan de Bray. The owning museum is sceptical of these identifications, regarding the figures as too generalized to be portraits.

== Later history ==
After Willem Schrijver's death in 1661, Wendela's brother Andries de Graeff, burgomaster of Amsterdam, took over her estate, including the Rembrandt painting discussed here. The painting belonged to the De Graeff family until 1752. After the death of Gerrit de Graeff van Zuid-Polsbroek, the family heirs sold the work through Anthony Rutgers, a Hamburg art dealer, to Landgrave William VIII of Hesse-Kassel, who added it to his art collection at his Bellevue Palace in Kassel.

In 2014–2015 the painting was in the major exhibition "Late Rembrandt" in the Rijksmuseum Amsterdam.

== Background ==
Jacob Blessing the Sons of Joseph shows a scene from the Old Testament book of Genesis, Chapter 48. In this scene, Joseph brings his two sons (Manasseh and Ephraim) to his dying father Jacob so that they can receive the family blessing. According to tradition, the eldest son is blessed with the patriarch's right hand. However, Jacob deliberately crossed his arms and put his right hand on Ephraim's (the younger son's) head and his left hand on Manasseh's (the oldest son's) head. Joseph was displeased and thought that his father was making a mistake. When Joseph tried to correct his father, Jacob refused and told Joseph that he was purposefully blessing the younger son.

== Asenath ==
Asenath was the daughter of an Egyptian priest. According to chapter 41 in the book of Genesis, she was given to Joseph by the pharaoh, himself. She is not usually included in depictions of this subject, and though more general religious interpretations have been suggested, the main reason for her addition here is to allow a family portrait of the commissioner's family, that of the Amsterdam patrician Willem Schrijver, It shows him with his wife Wendela de Graeff and their children as biblical figures.".

Asenath's ornate headdress is certainly not a typical Dutch style of the period. Some scholars compared it to 15th-century Burgundian fashions, but Marieke de Winkel has suggested it draws from contemporary depictions of females from the Ottoman Empire, or specifically Cairo, taken as a contemporary equivalent for Asenath's foreigness as an Egyptian.

== Artistic qualities ==
Rembrandt is famous for his use of light and shadow (Chiaroscuro) and Jacob Blessing the Sons of Joseph is not an exception. This draws attention to the main characters of Jacob, Joseph, Ephraim, Manasseh, and Asenath while obscuring the background. In particular, there seems to be a halo surrounding Ephraim as he is being blessed. Also notable is the prominent colors that Rembrandt used. The yellows, browns, and reds give the painting a mood that is "both intimate and sacred, tender and solemn".

== See also ==
- List of paintings by Rembrandt
