= Portrait of Anna van der Aar =

Painting by Frans Hals

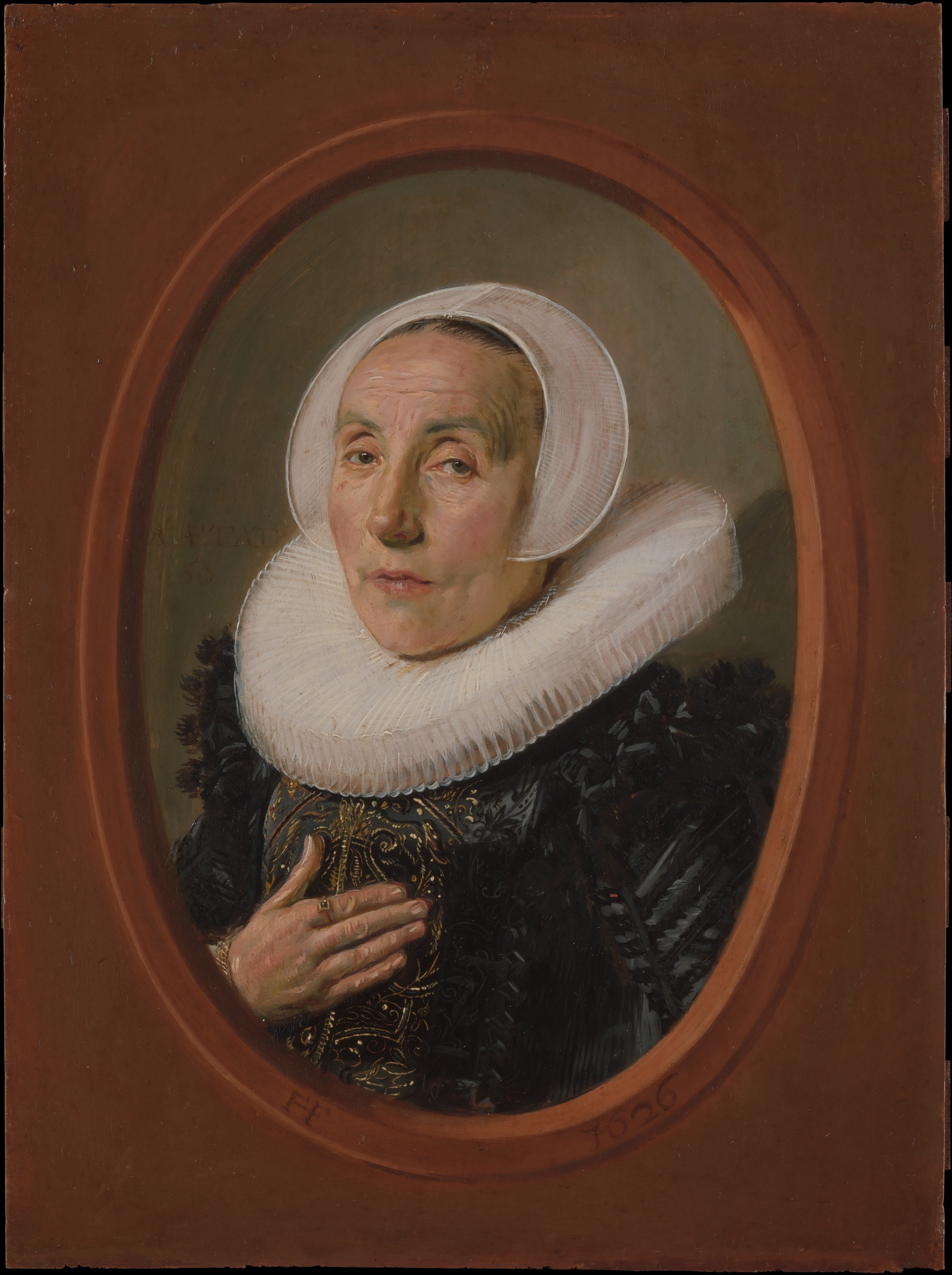
- Portrait of Anna van der Aar, 1626, oil on panel, 22.2 x 16.5 cm
- Artist: Frans Hals
- Year: 1626
- Catalogue: Hofstede de Groot, Catalog 1910: #225
- Medium: Oil on panel
- Dimensions: 22.2 cm × 16.5 cm (8.7 in × 6.5 in)
- Location: Metropolitan Museum of Art; New York
- Owner: Bequest of Mrs. H. O. Havemeyer, 1929
- Accession: 29.100.9
- Website: MET online

Portrait of Anna van der Aar is an oil-on-panel painting by the Dutch Golden Age painter Frans Hals, painted in 1626 and now in the Metropolitan Museum of Art, in New York. It is considered a pendant portrait to that of her husband, the writer Petrus Scriverius.

== Painting ==
This painting was documented by Hofstede de Groot in 1910, who wrote:

225. ANNA VAN DER AAR (born in 1576), wife of Petrus Scriverius. B. 66; M. 73. Half-length; in a painted oval. She is turned three-quarters left. Her right hand is on her bosom. She wears a black dress embroidered with gold, a white cap, and a large ruff. [Pendant to 224.] Inscribed in the right centre, "Ao AETAT 50," and below on the painted frame signed with the monogram and the date 1626; panel, 8 1/2 inches by 6 inches. Mentioned by Paul Eudel, L'Hôtel Drouot en 1881, p. 72; and see Moes, Iconographia Batava, No. 7. Engraved by Adrien Didier in the Wilson catalogue.

In the collection of M. J. Caan van Maurik, Oudewater. Sales. John W. Wilson of Brussels, Paris, March 14, 1881 see 1873 catalogue, p. 82 (80,000 francs, with pendant).

E. Secretan, Paris, July I, 1889, No. 125 (91,000 francs, with pendant). In the collection of the late H. O. Havemeyer, New York.

== Pendants ==
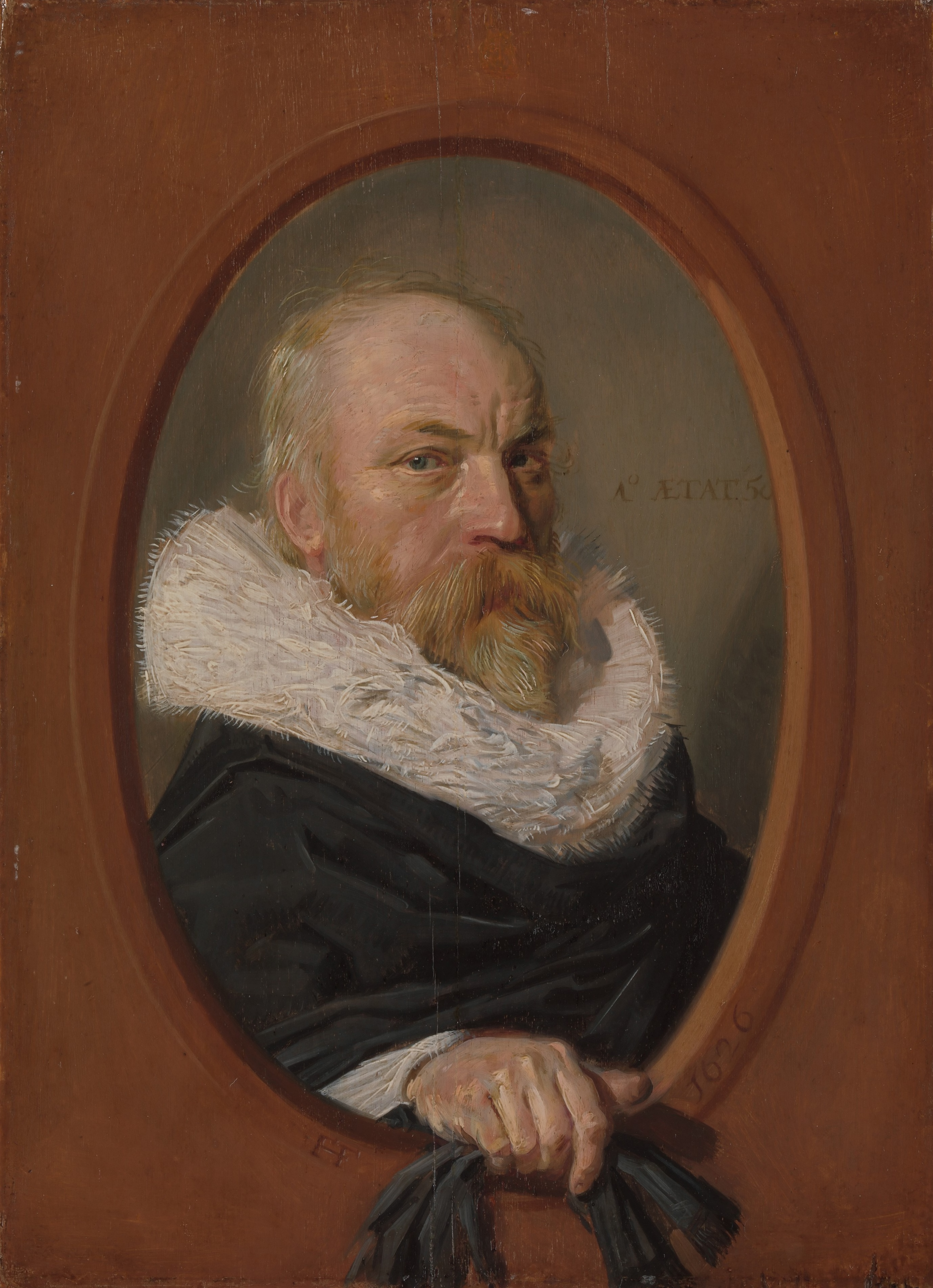

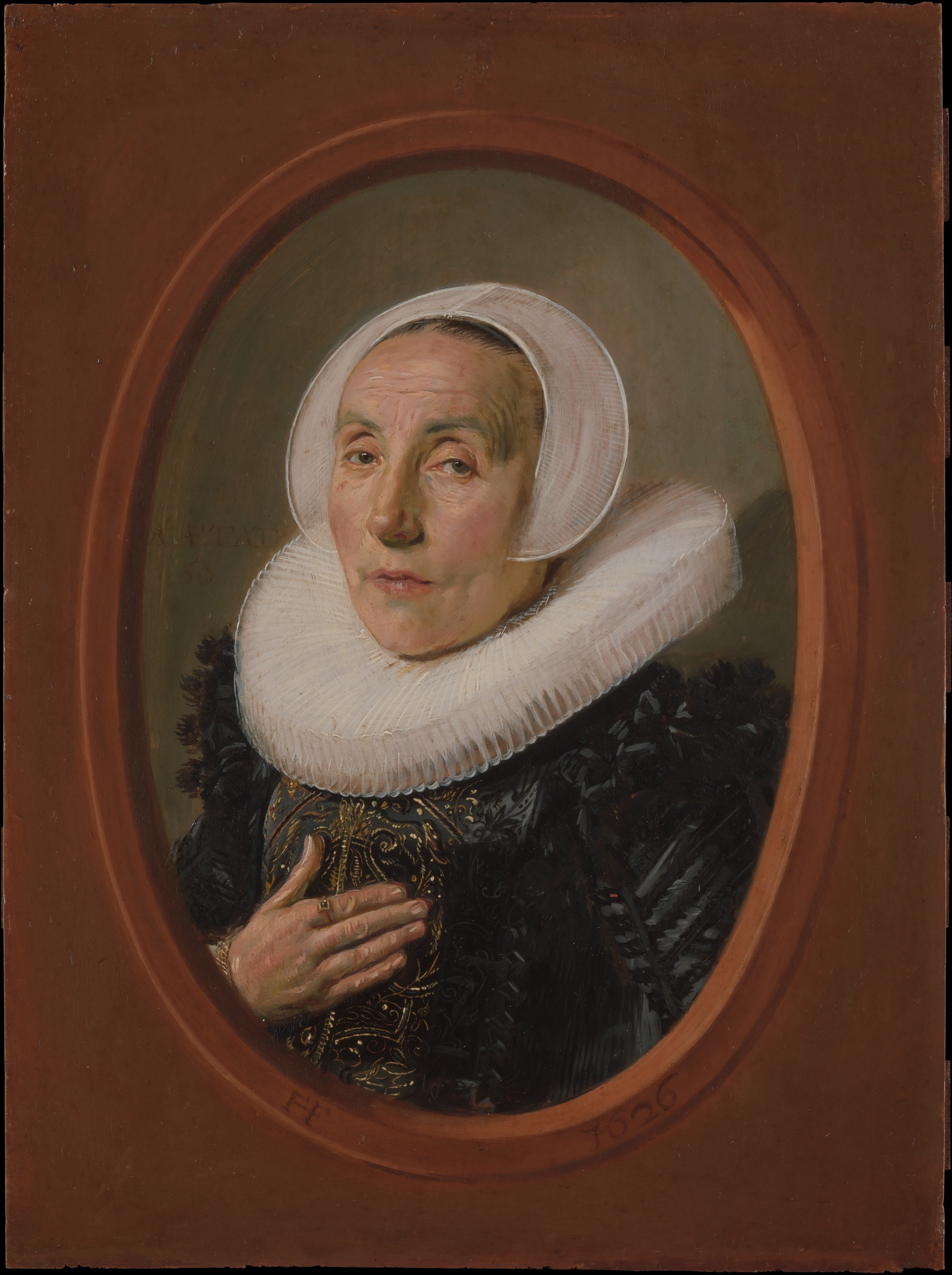

== See also ==
- List of paintings by Frans Hals
