= The Arrival of Cornelis de Graeff and Members of His Family at Soestdijk, His Country Estate =

Painting by Thomas de Keyser and Jacob van Ruisdael

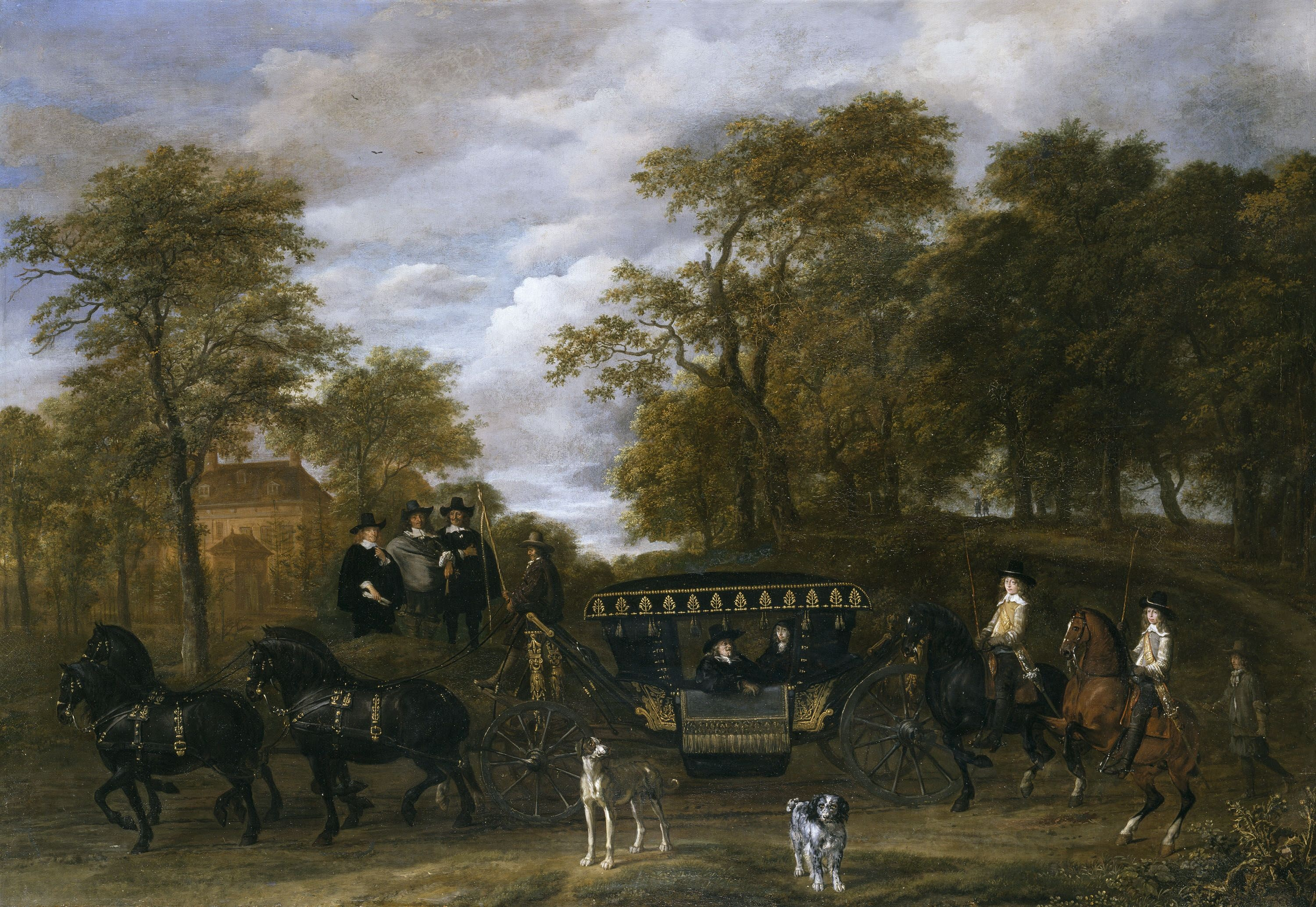
The Arrival of Cornelis de Graeff and Members of His Family at Soestdijk, His Country Estate by Jacob van Ruisdael

The Arrival of Cornelis de Graeff and Members of His Family at Soestdijk, His Country Estate (c. 1660) is an oil on canvas painting by the Dutch Golden Age painters Thomas de Keyser and Jacob van Ruisdael. It is in the collection of the National Gallery of Ireland in Dublin.

The painting shows the arrival of the wealthy Amsterdam burgomaster Cornelis de Graeff with his second wife Catharina Hooft and his sons Pieter and Jacob de Graeff at Soestdijk Palace, his country estate near Utrecht. The three men on the left are his brothers-in-law Willem Schrijver and Pieter Trip and his younger brother Andries de Graeff.

The dimensions are 118.4 cm × 170.5 cm (46.6 in × 67.1 in).

Art historian Seymour Slive attributes the background and country estate to the hand of Jacob van Ruisdael in his 2001 catalogue raisonné. Hofstede de Groot did not include this work in his 1911 catalogue raisonné of Ruisdael. The carriage, people and animals are from the hand of Thomas de Keyser.

The painting was commissioned by de Graeff. This is the only known commissioned work by Jacob van Ruisdael.

== See also ==
- List of paintings by Jacob van Ruisdael
