= Mattheus Smallegange =

Dutch historian

Mattheus Smallegange (Goes, baptized December 29, 1624 - Goes, January 5, 1710) was a Dutch historian, lawyer, genealogist and translator.

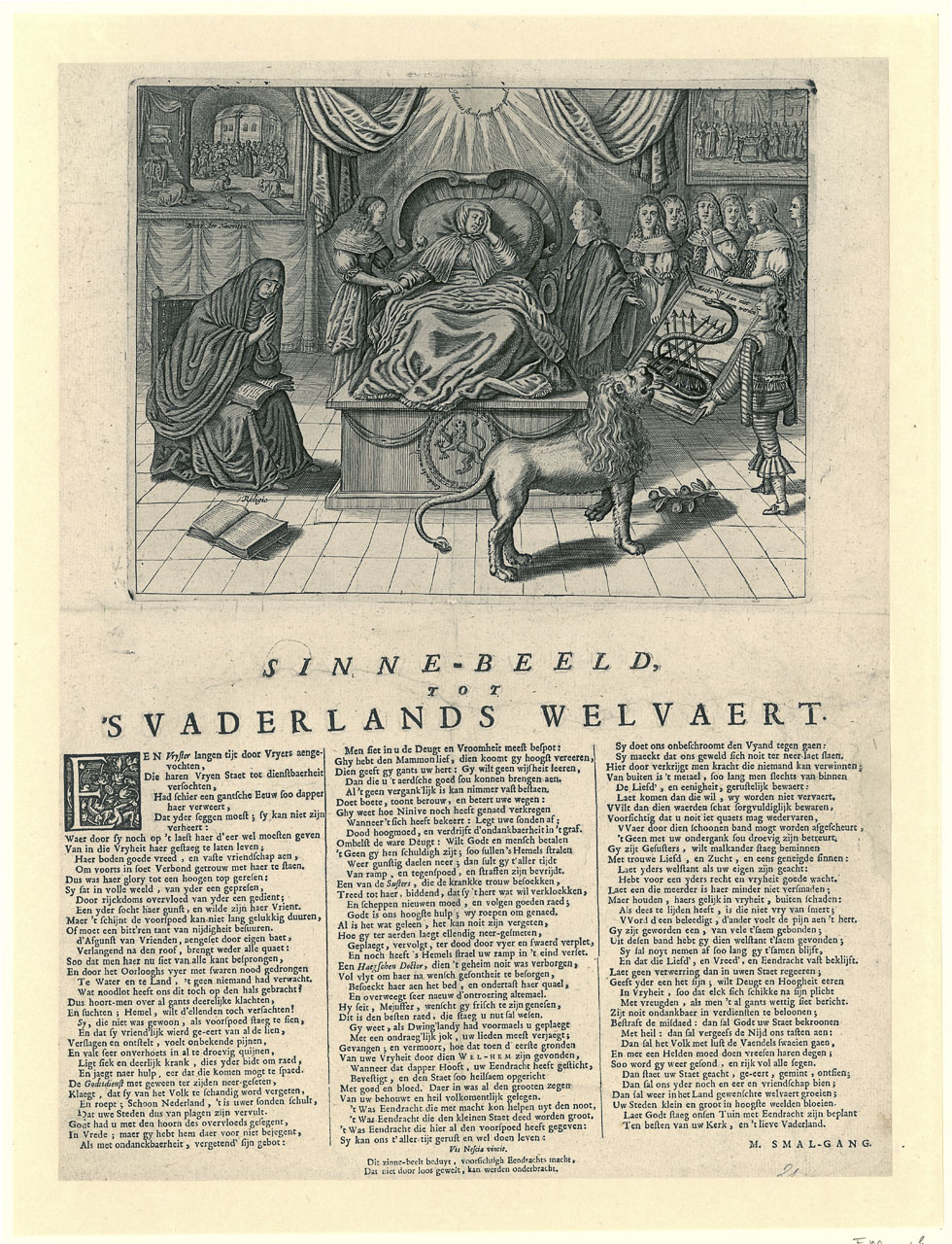
Picture from the Smalleganges Sinne

He studied law in Utrecht (1638 - 1647). However, he probably didn't graduate.

In 1651 he traveled through France to further develop his skills in the French and Italian language. After his return, he established himself as commissioner of the militia in Goes. Around 1660 he lived in Amsterdam and began to publish. After publishing his Sinnebeeld in honor of Wilhem the III ( 1665 ) he was expelled from the city for a year.

After that time he is found again in Goes, and is also mentioned in Middelburg. In 1682 he started writing his best-known work: Nieuwe Cronyk Van Zeeland, an extensive (almost 800-page long) illustrated description of Zeeland. The Cronyk was finished in 1696, but only appeared in 1700. The years of delay were caused by disagreements between the Zeeland cities and the States of Zeeland - the regional government.

The work is a continuation and summary of the chronicles of Jacobus Eyndius (Chronici Zelandiae) and Johan Reygersberg (Dye Chronijck van Zeelandt). Much (sometimes verbatim) was also taken from the work of Boxhorn and Vredius (Olivier de Wree). Whenever he could, Smallegange copied parts of the old chronicles.

Smallegange's Cronyk was published when the publishing profession in Middelburg, which had been flourishing in the early 17th-century, was already on in decline. Nevertheless, his book is still an interesting work for the province. A second part was foreseen, but never materialized. Smallegange summarized this in a short Besluyt, which appeared in 1704. He did write other works, including a number of genealogies and translations.

Smallegange was a passionate researcher and collector of historical details, which cost him a lot of time, effort and money. The collection of material for his masterpiece, the Cronyk, was financed by the State. He died, unmarried, in a rented room in Goes.

== Literature ==
- de Wind, S. (1849). "Something about Matthew Smallegange and his chronicle of Zeeland". Nehallenia, part 1. pp. 35–74.
- Verkruijsse, P.J. (1967). Noise around a seventeenth-century sickbed: or, the four versions of Mattheus Smalleganges sinnebeeld compared to each other. Amsterdam.
- PJ Verkruijsse; Mattheus Smallegange (1624-1710) and his cronyk van Zeeland; Interbook International (Schiedam) (1977)
- PJ Verkruijsse; Mattheus Smallegange (1624-1710): Zeeland historian, genealogist and translator. Descriptive personal bibliography (1983)
