= Wendela de Graeff =

Dutch patrician (1607–1652)

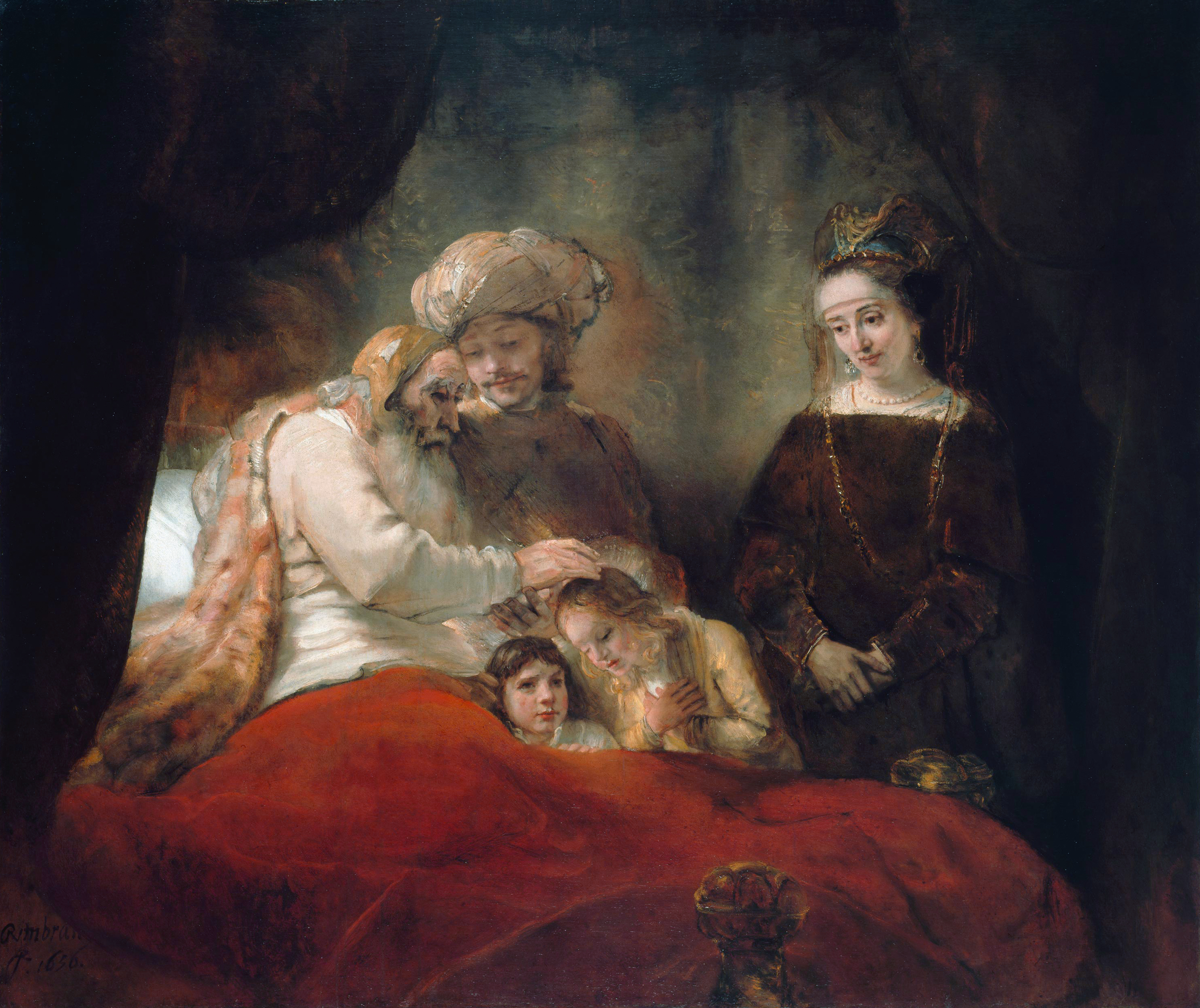
Jacob Blessing the Sons of Joseph by Rembrandt (Portrait of the family of Willem Schrijver and Wendela de Graeff as biblical characters; 1656)

Wendela de Graeff (also Wijntje de Graeff, September 22, 1607 – February 27, 1652) was a Dutch patrician and a member of the de Graeff family.

== Biography ==
Wendela was the daughter of Amsterdam burgomaster Jacob Dircksz de Graeff and Aaltje Loen from the Boelens Loen family.

Wendela had a daughter, Margaretha Nooms (1632–1650), from a premarital relationship with Willem Nooms, Lord of Aarlanderveen, whom she acknowledged as her legitimate child.

Wendela first married Pieter van Papenbroeck in 1634; he died on April 17, 1642. After his death, she inherited a fortune of 439,000 guilders. In 1645, she married Willem Schrijver, the son of the prominent Dutch scholar Petrus Scriverius.

When she remarried Willem Schrijver in 1645, Wendela de Graeff lived on the Herengracht in Amsterdam. There her mother-in-law Elisabeth Jacobsdr Pancras, widow of Marten van Papenbroeck, had bought two adjacent houses and yards in 1644 for 38,000 guilders: the present numbers 210 and 212, close to burgomaster Cornelis de Graeff, who lived in no. 216. Six children were born from both marriages: Jacobus Martinus and Aaltje van Papenbroeck (married Gerard Bicker (I) van Swieten), Pieter (died at a young age), Anna (died at a young age), Jan and Wilhelmus Schrijver (1651-1673), married to Margaretha Six (1653-1704).

In 1655/56 Willem commissioned Rembrandt to paint Jacob Blessing the Sons of Joseph, which depicts his father Petrus, himself (as Joseph) with his late wife Wendela (as Asenath) and their two sons from her first and second marriage as biblical characters.

Wendela de Graeff-Schrijver died in 1652 and is buried in the Oude Kerk in Amsterdam, in the Sint Cornelis choir, which was the family grave of the De Graeff family. After Wendela's death, Willem Schrijver and the Van Papenbroeck family fought for this inheritance. When Willem died in 1661, Wendela's brother Andries de Graeff took over his position. Most of the fortune went but after the appeals process to the Van Papenbroeck. However, the painting from Rembrandt became the property of De Graeff.

== Coat of arms ==
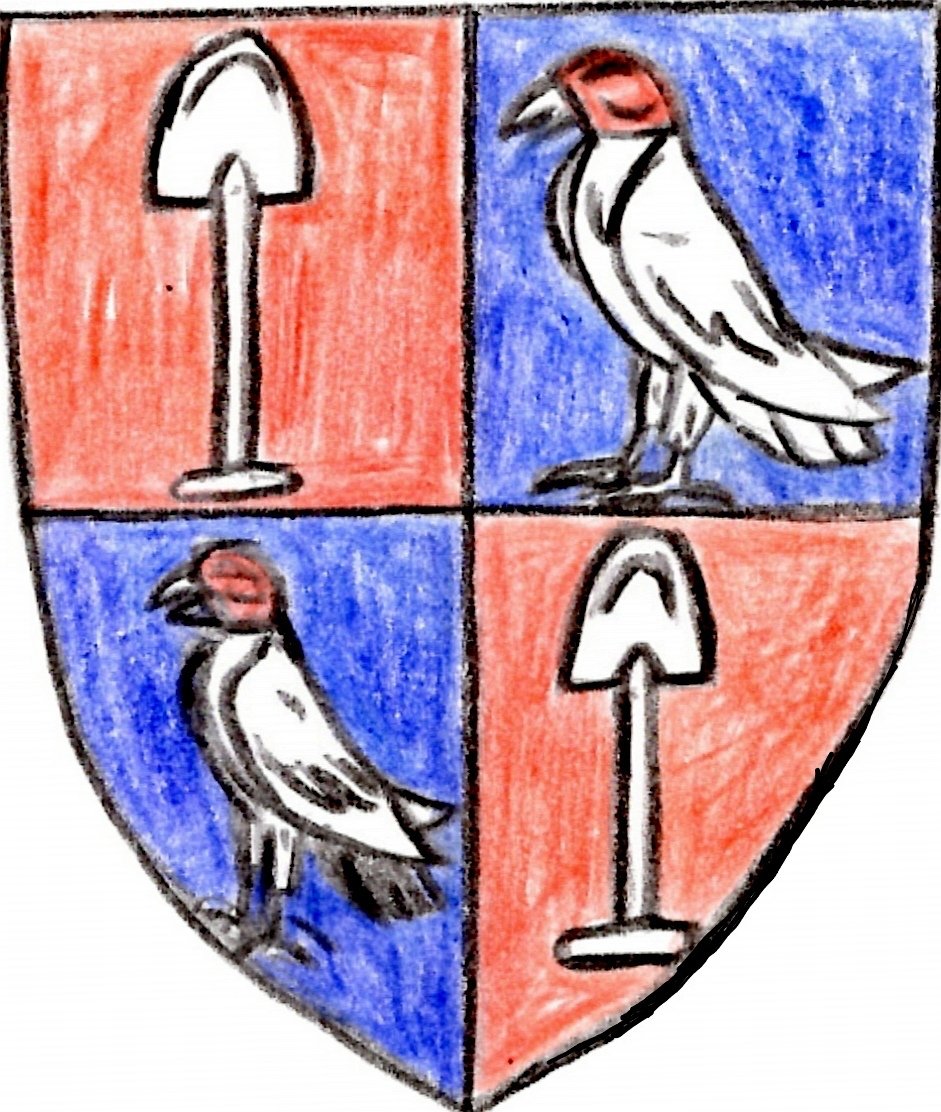
Coat of arms

Wendela de Graeff's coat of arms of origin was quartered and showed the following symbols:

- field 1 (left above) the silver shovel on a red background of their paternal ancestors, the Herren von Graben
- field 2 (right above) it shows a silver falcon on a blue background. The origin of the falcon lies in the possession of the Valckeveen estate (later the Valckenburg estate) in Gooiland
- field 3 (left below), same as field 2
- field 4 (right below), same as field 1
- helmet covers in red and silver
- helm adornment shows an upright silver spade with ostrich feathers (Herren von Graben)
- motto: MORS SCEPTRA LIGONIBUS AEQUAT (DEATH MAKES SEPTRES AND HOES EQUAL)
