= Marcus Zuerius van Boxhorn =

Dutch linguist (1612–1653)

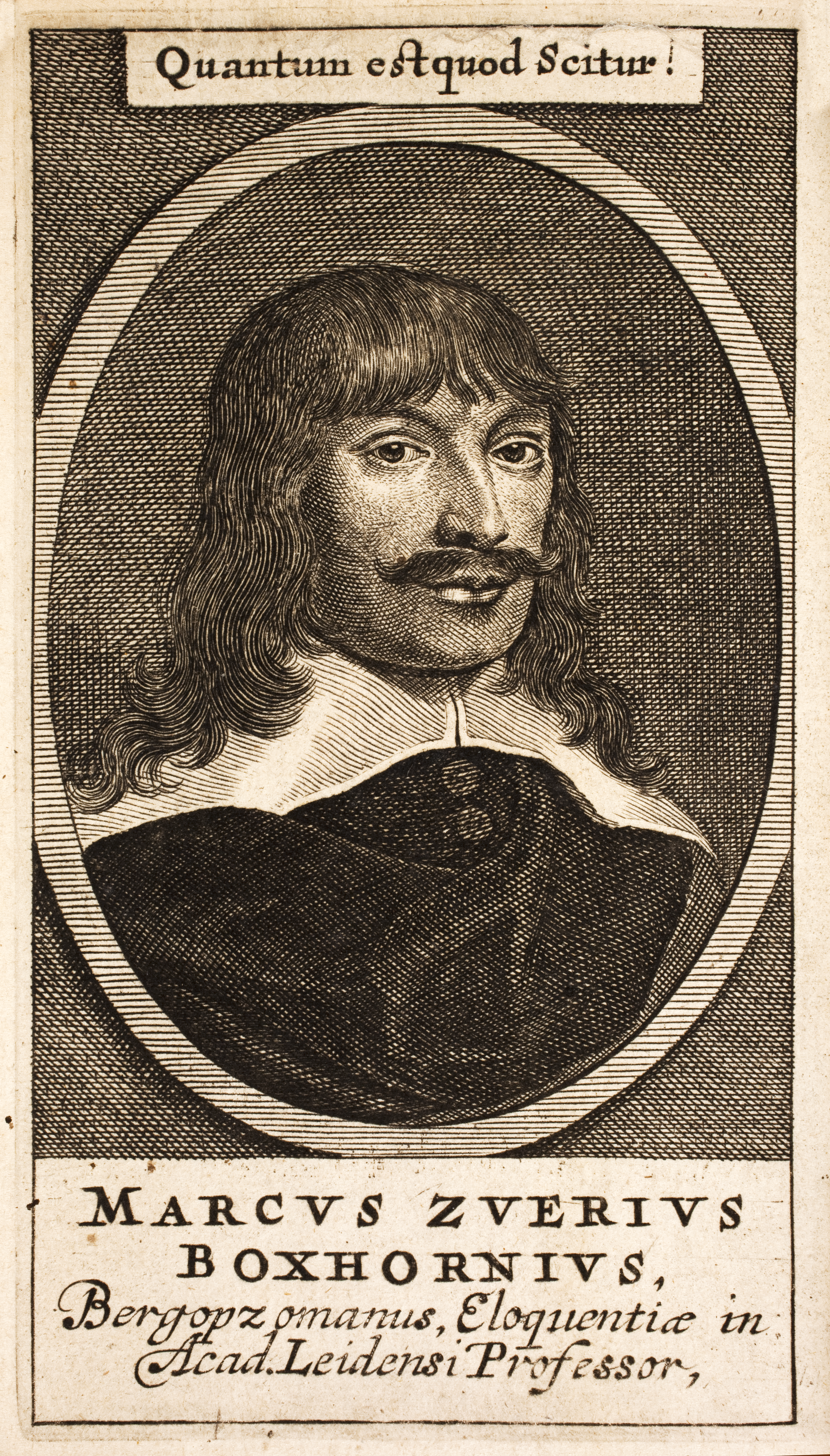
Etched portrait from the editions of Boxhorn's works by Caspar Commelijn (1660ff.), after a portrait of c. 1640

Marcus Zuerius van Boxhorn (August 28, 1612 – October 3, 1653) was a Dutch scholar (his Latinised name was Marcus Zuerius Boxhornius). Born in Bergen op Zoom, he was professor at the University of Leiden. He discovered the similarity among Indo-European languages, and supposed the existence of a primitive common language which he called 'Scythian'. He included in his hypothesis Dutch, Greek, Latin, Persian, and German, later adding Slavic, Celtic and Baltic languages. He excluded languages such as Hebrew from his hypothesis. He died in Leiden.

== Indo-Scythian theory ==
Boxhorn wrote numerous works, especially about the history of his homeland.

Marcus Zuërius van Boxhorn was one of the most important historical linguists. His Indo-Scythian theory laid the foundation for today's understanding of the Indo-European language family. In the 17th century he first investigated a possible genetic relationship mainly in European languages. In his opinion, languages such as Greek, Latin, Welsh, German, Russian, Celtic, Turkish, Latvian, Lithuanian and later also Persian had a common original language. Van Boxhorn first described his Indo-Scythian theory in 1637 in a letter to his friend Claudius Salmasius, who later added Sanskrit to van Boxhorn's theory. In 1647 van Boxhorn published his theory in three parts.

At that time, many people believed that Hebrew was the original human language. This assumption was mostly based on biblical sources. Two compatriots of van Boxhorn, Johannes Goropius Becanus (1519–1572) and Adriaan van Schrieck (1560–1621), however, were of the opinion that Dutch was the original language. Van Boxhorn rejected this theory and assumed a common original language of Latin, Greek, Germanic, Russian, Welsh, Latvian, Lithuanian, Turkish and Persian, which he named Scythian. He did not believe that all languages are derived from a single language.

Van Boxhorn first publicly postulated his theory in a work about the goddess Nehalennia, whose statues and altars were discovered in January 1647 in the Dutch province of Zeeland. Van Boxhorn dealt with the origin of the name of Nehalennia, which had not yet been clarified. The first volume of his work van Boxhorn wrote in the form of an open letter to the Countess Amalia of Solms-Braunfels, in the third volume he explained his so-called Indo-Scythian theory and presented evidence for it.

The inspiration for van Boxhorn's theory was, among other things, the Lexicon Symphonum published in Basel in 1537 by the Bohemian humanist Sigismund Gelenius, who was born in Prague. Even before Boxhorn, the University of Leiden had studied the genetic relationship of languages and language groups. In 1575, Franciscus Raphelengius (Ravlenghien) (1539–1597), professor of Hebrew in Leiden, taught his students about the similarities between the Persian and the Germanic languages, which suggested a genetic relationship. This idea was later developed in Leiden by Bonaventura de Smet and later Johann Elichmann. In the library of his friend Petrus Scriverius, also known as Peter Schrijver, Boxhorn found the works of Rudolphus Agricola von Groningen, alias Roelof Huisman, Johannes Aventinus (Turmair) and Hadrianus Junius von Hoorn, alias Adriaen de Jonghe, who examined the relationship between Greek, Latin and Germanic.

A century after Boxhorn postulated his theory, the French scholar Gaston-Laurent Cœurdoux (1691–1779) found grammatical evidence that Sanskrit was related to Indo-Scythian, i.e. Indo-European languages. In 1771 he found cognates of the verb "to be" in Sanskrit and Latin, which indicated a relationship. In Germany, van Boxhorn's theory was propagated in 1686 in the thesis of Swedish philologist Andreas Jäger at the University of Wittenberg. In England the theory became known at the beginning of the 18th century and was spread by Lord Monboddo (James Burnet). Inspired by these writings, Sir William Jones (1746–1794) also dealt with the Indo-European theory. Because of his high standing with the British colonial government and his status in Asian society, he won recognition of the kinship of Sanskrit to Greek and Latin. Although Jones himself made no studies on this relationship, he mentioned the work of Lord Monboddo, from which he had learned of van Boxhorn's results.

== Methodology ==
Van Boxhorn

To prove the common origin of languages, van Boxhorn compared etymologies, inflection patterns and grammars of Greek, Latin, Persian, Old Saxon, Dutch and German, Gothic, Russian, Danish, Swedish, Lithuanian, Czech, Croatian and Welsh. He found similarities that suggest a genetic relationship of these languages. Van Boxhorn was the first to include not only Greek, Germanic, Romance and Slavic languages in the language family, but also Persian, Sanskrit, Celtic and Baltic languages.

Marcus Zuerius van Boxhorn compared not only similar words in different languages, but whole inflection patterns and grammars. He was of the opinion that the relationship between languages must be verifiable on the basis of systematic grammatical correspondences and not only postulated on the basis of similar-looking word forms. He was the founder of the methodology for studying language that we now call the comparative method.

Van Boxhorn viewed language as an organic system and warned against loan words and Wanderworts, which spread as loanwords among languages and cultures, and which can influence the comparison of languages. A kinship of languages is often wrongly suspected on the basis of similar words, but these have been adopted from one language and originally come from another language. Van Boxhorn wanted to prevent these misinterpretations by systematically comparing inflection morphology and other grammatical features.

== Works ==
- Prima religionis Christianae Rudimenta, Leiden, 1650

== Literature ==
- Lyle Campbell / William J. Posner: Language Classification. History and Method. Cambridge University Press, Cambridge 2008.
- Daniel Droixhe: La linguistique et l’appel de l’histoire, 1600–1800. Rationalisme et révolutions positivistes. Droz, Genf 1978.
- Daniel Droixhe: Boxhorn's Bad Reputation. A Chapter in Academic Linguistics. In: Klaus D. Dutz (Ed.): Speculum historiographiae linguisticae. Kurzbeiträge der IV. Internationalen Konferenz zur Geschichte der Sprachwissenschaften (ICHoLS IV), Trier 24-27 1987. Nodus, Münster 1989. p. 359–84.
- Daniel Droixhe: Boxhorn, in: R. E. Asher (Eds.): The Encyclopedia of Language and Linguistics. Pergamon Press, Oxford 1994.
- Daniel Droixhe: Souvenirs de Babel. La reconstruction de l’histoire des langues de la Renaissance aux Lumières. Académie royale de langue et de littérature françaises de Belgique, Brüssel 2007.
- R.H.F. Hofman: Marcus Zuerius Boxhorn (1612-1653), in: L. Toorians (Ed.): Kelten en de Nederlanden van prehistorie tot heden. Peeters, Leuven/Paris 1998. pp. 149–167.
- George van Driem: Languages of the Himalayas. An Ethnolinguistic Handbook of the Greater Himalayan Region. Brill, Leiden 2001. p. 1412.
- B. van Wayenburg: Marcus van Boxhorn. Uitvinder van de Europese oertaal. In: Mare di libri 32 2004.
