= Zuiddorpe =

- Village
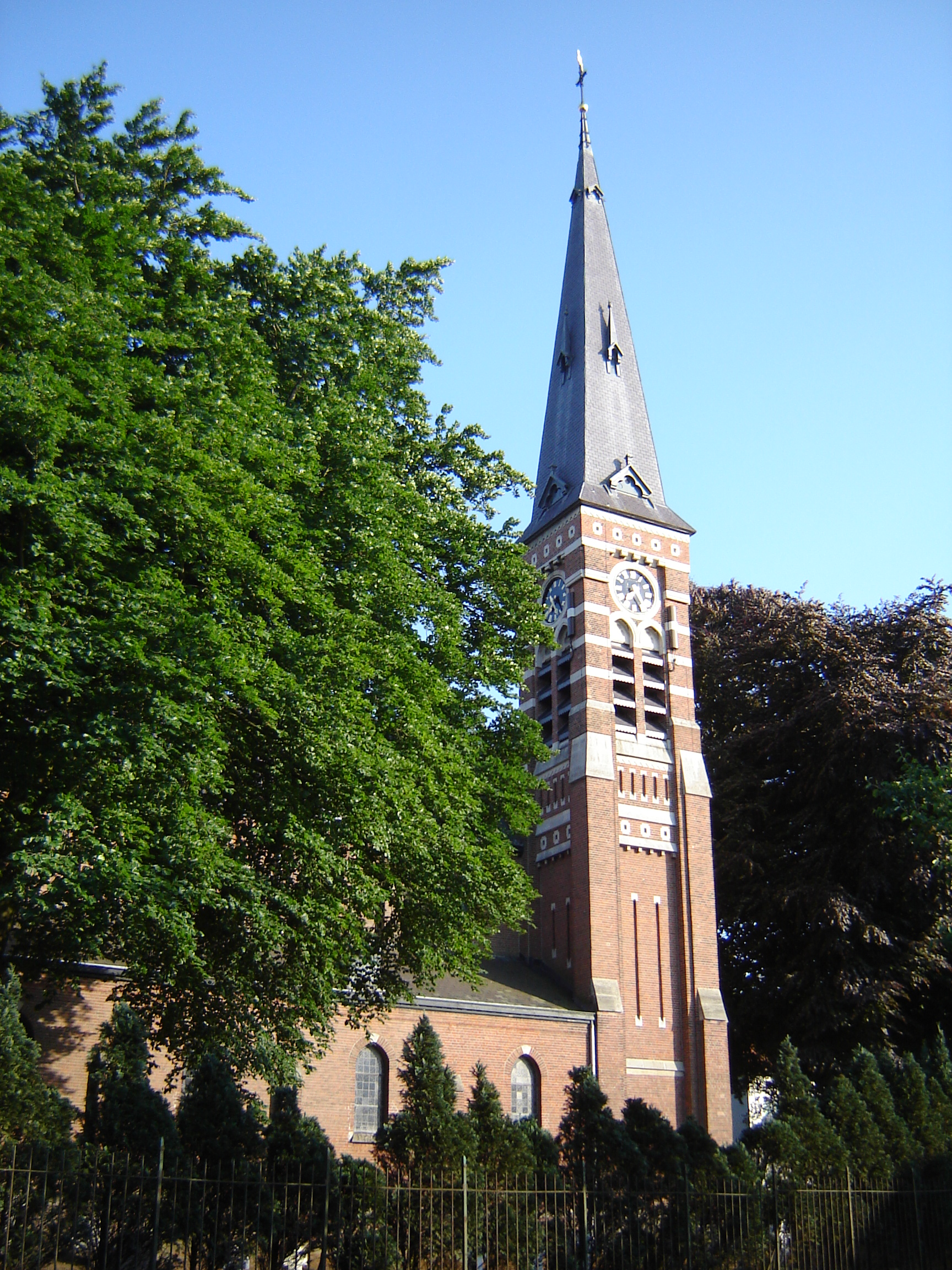
- Assumption of Mary church

- Coat of arms

- Location in the province of Zeeland in the Netherlands Zuiddorpe (Netherlands)
- Coordinates: 51°14′3″N 3°54′6″E
- Country: Netherlands
- Province: Zeeland
- Municipality: Terneuzen

Area
  - Total: 9.25 km^{2} (3.57 sq mi)
- Elevation: 1.9 m (6.2 ft)

Population (2021)
  - Total: 890
  - Density: 96/km^{2} (250/sq mi)
- Time zone: UTC+1 (CET)
  - Summer (DST): UTC+2 (CEST)
- Postal code: 4574
- Dialing code: 0115

Zuiddorpe is a village in the Dutch province of Zeeland. It is a part of the municipality of Terneuzen, and lies about 34 km southeast of Vlissingen.

== History ==
The village was first mentioned in 1366 or 1367 as Zuutdorp, and means "southern village". South has been added to distinguish from Westdorpe and is relative to Axel. Zuiddorpe is a road village with a village square. A parish has been known to exist since 1236 which was called "De Moeren" in reference to the peat excavation in the nearby moorlands.

The Catholic Assumption of Mary church is a three-aisled church with a tower in the north-western corner. It was built between 1885 and 1886 to replace its 1817 predecessor. The church has a richly decorated pulpit from 1637.

Zuiddorpe was home to 702 people in 1840. It was a separate municipality until 1970, when it was merged with Axel. In 2003, it became part of the municipality of Terneuzen.
