= Westdorpe =

- Village
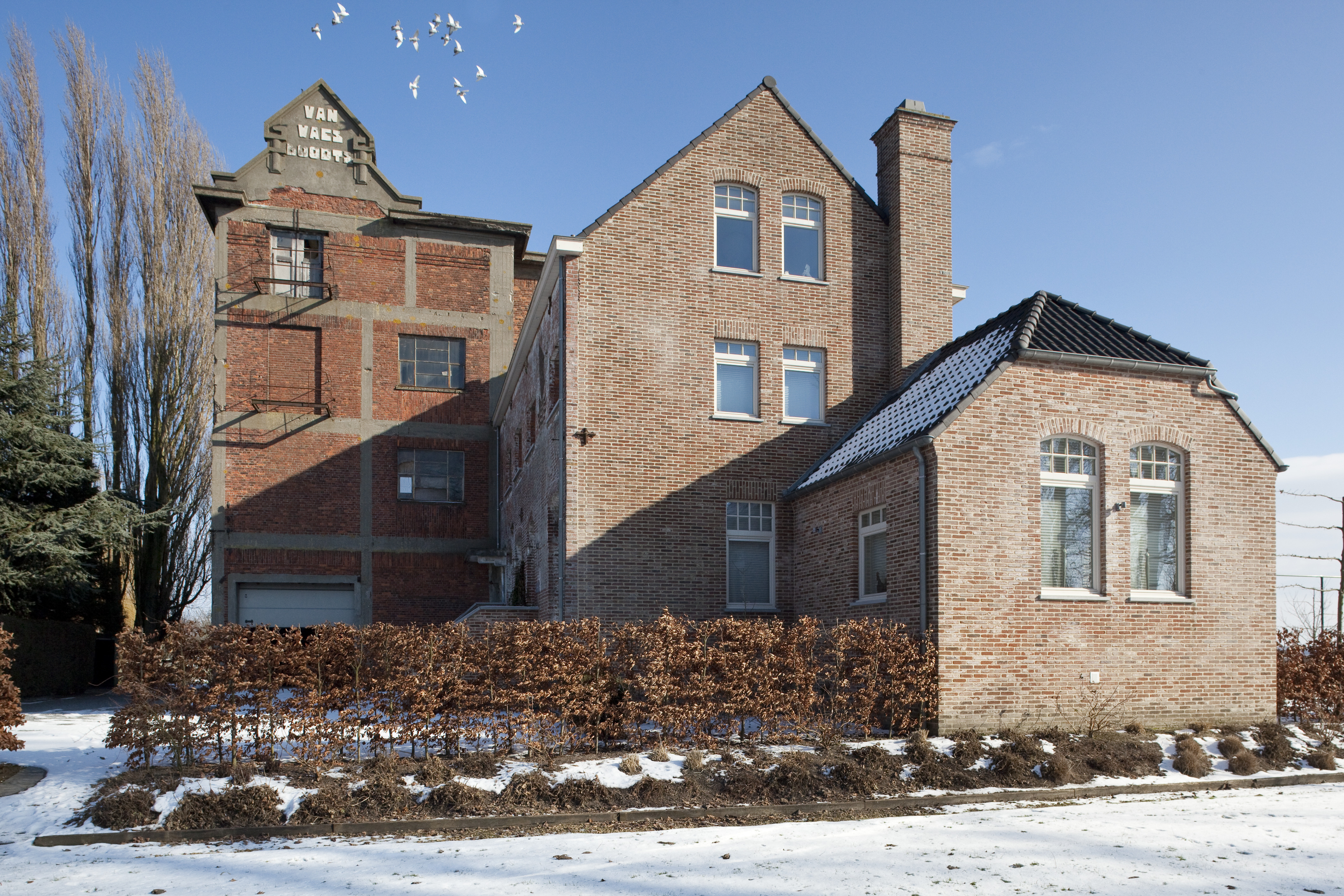
- Former brewery Van Waes Boodts

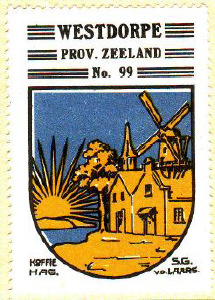
- Coat of arms

- Location in the province of Zeeland in the Netherlands Westdorpe (Netherlands)
- Coordinates: 51°13′52″N 3°49′40″E
- Country: Netherlands
- Province: Zeeland
- Municipality: Terneuzen

Area
  - Total: 24.06 km^{2} (9.29 sq mi)
- Elevation: 3.1 m (10 ft)

Population (2021)
  - Total: 1,915
  - Density: 79.59/km^{2} (206.1/sq mi)
- Time zone: UTC+1 (CET)
  - Summer (DST): UTC+2 (CEST)
- Postal code: 4554
- Dialing code: 0115

Westdorpe is a village in the Dutch province of Zeeland. It is a part of the municipality of Terneuzen, and lies about 31 km southeast of Vlissingen.

== History ==
The village was first mentioned in 1545 as Westdorp, and means "western village". West is relative to Axel. The original village was lost in a flood in 1545. It was rebuilt by 1570 to the south-west. In 1586, it was inundated as a result of the Dutch Revolt. The current Westdorpe dates from 1674 when the area was poldered. Westdorpe was part of the Spanish Netherlands until 1644 when it was conquered by the Dutch Republic.

The Visitation of Mary church was built in 1887. In 1940, it was blown up, and it was rebuilt in 1947. It is a three-aisled church with a detached tower. There used to be three beer breweries in Westdorpe.

Westdorpe was home to 1,410 people in 1840. Westdorpe was a separate municipality until 1970, when it was merged with Sas van Gent. In 2003, it became part of Terneuzen.

== Notable people ==
- Ed van Dommelen (1934—2021), politician and mayor of Huijbergen.

== Gallery ==
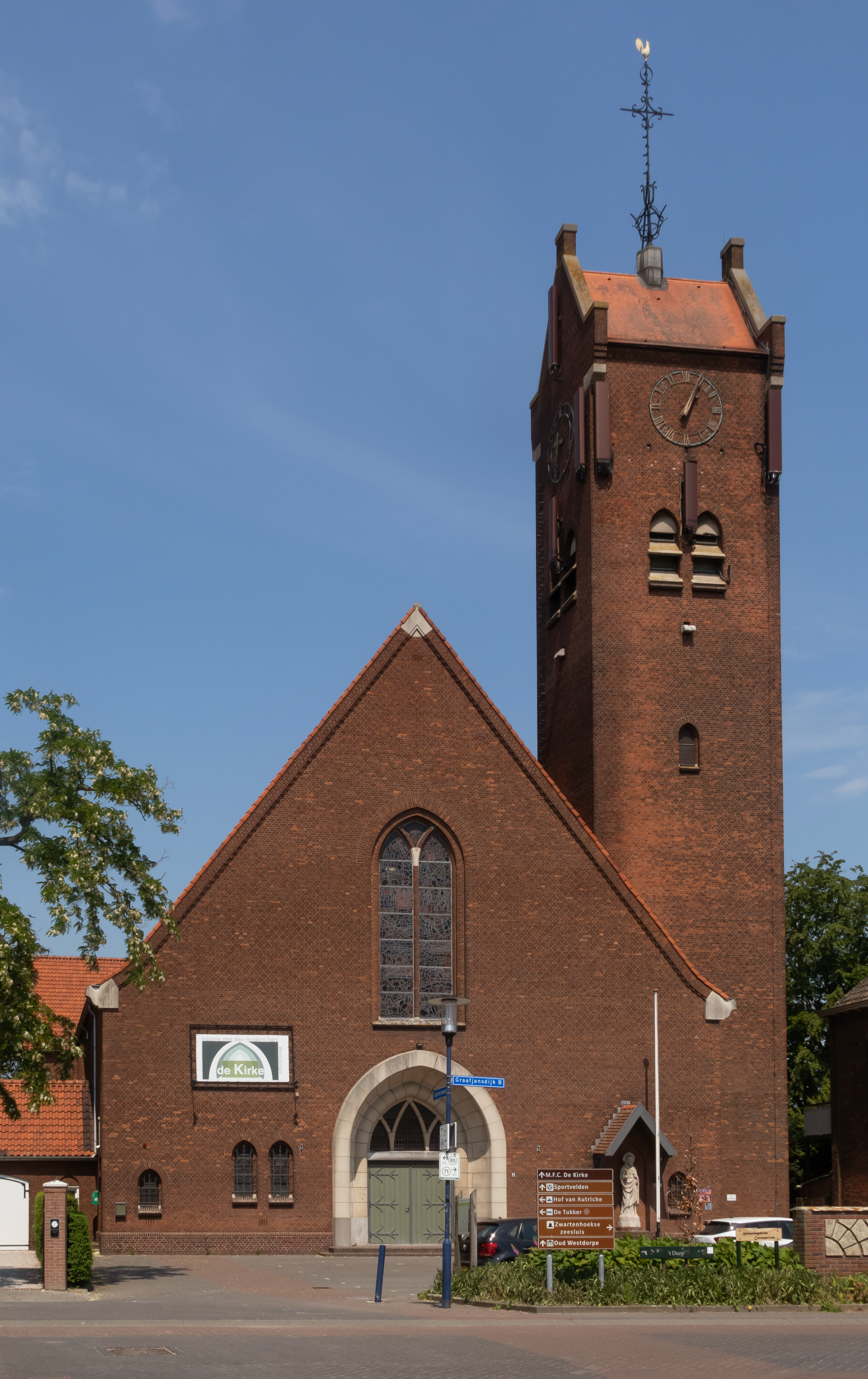
Visitation of Mary church

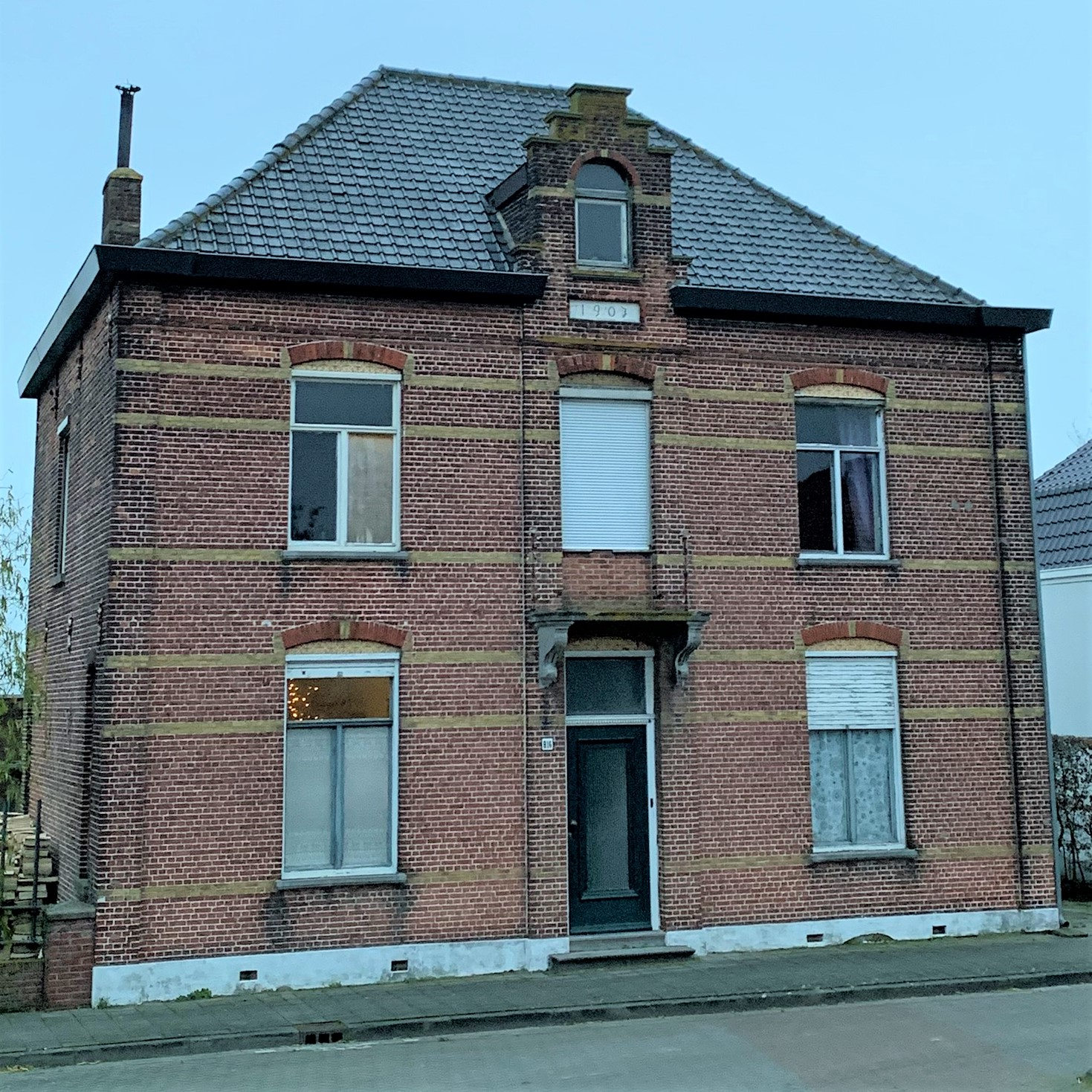
House in Westdorpe

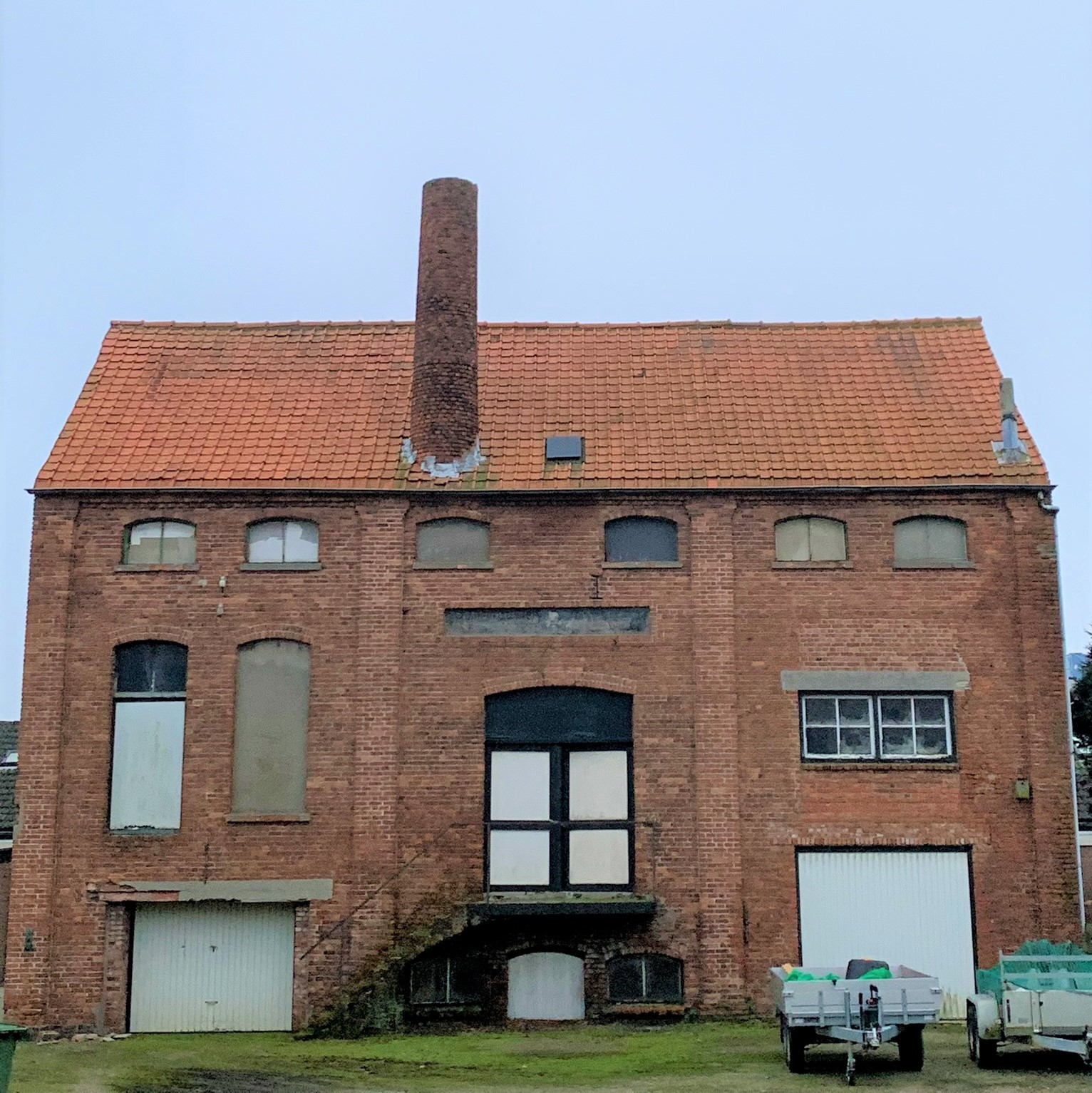
Former beer brewery De Witte Leeuw

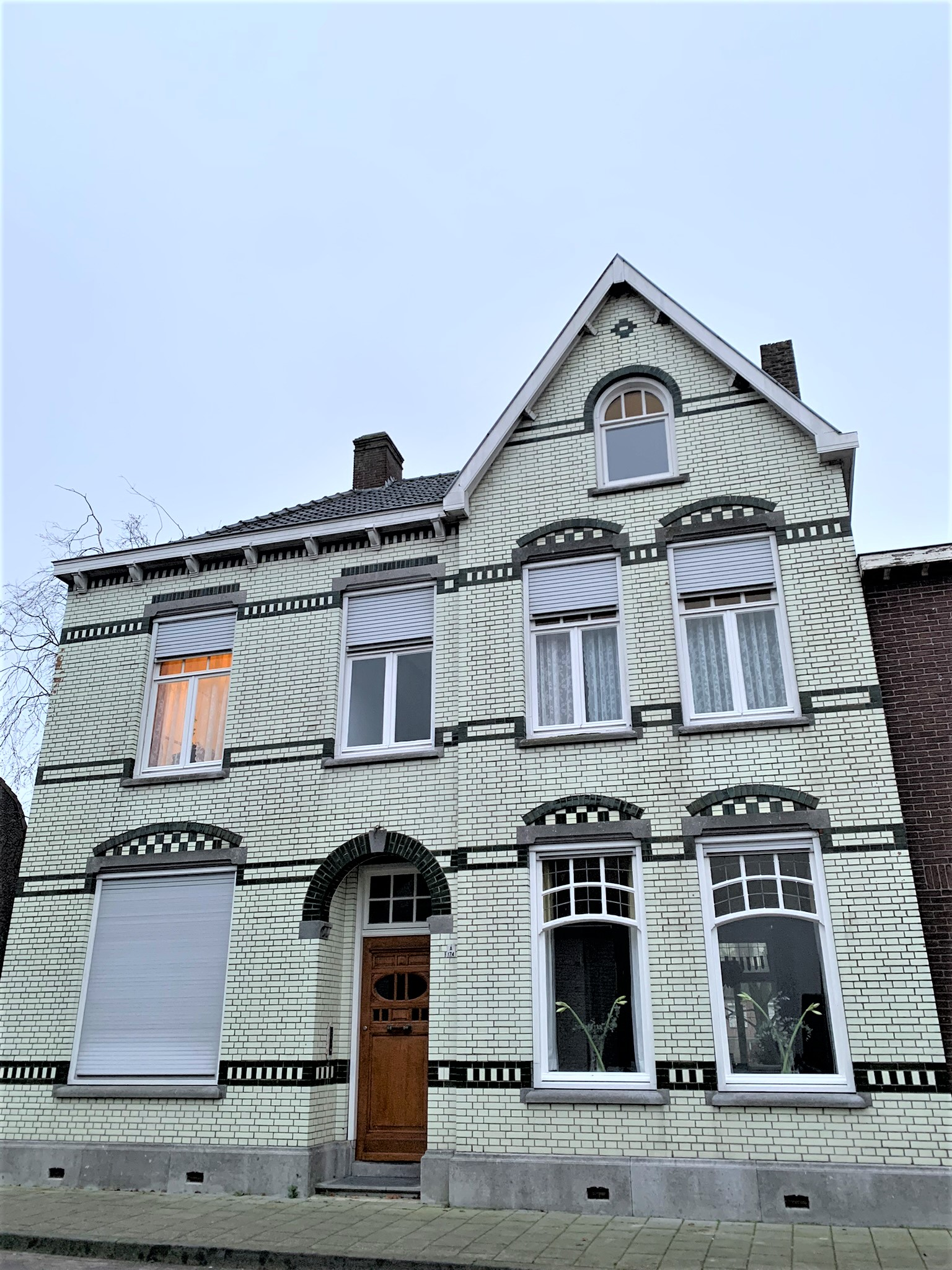
House in Westdorpe

== Climate ==
Climate data for Westdorpe (1991−2020 normals, extremes 1991−present)
Month	Jan	Feb	Mar	Apr	May	Jun	Jul	Aug	Sep	Oct	Nov	Dec	Year
Record high °C (°F)	14.9 (58.8)	18.9 (66.0)	24.9 (76.8)	29.7 (85.5)	31.7 (89.1)	33.6 (92.5)	40.6 (105.1)	36.4 (97.5)	33.7 (92.7)	27.1 (80.8)	20.4 (68.7)	15.9 (60.6)	40.6 (105.1)
Mean daily maximum °C (°F)	6.6 (43.9)	7.5 (45.5)	10.9 (51.6)	15.0 (59.0)	18.4 (65.1)	21.1 (70.0)	23.5 (74.3)	23.5 (74.3)	19.9 (67.8)	15.3 (59.5)	10.3 (50.5)	7.1 (44.8)	14.9 (58.8)
Daily mean °C (°F)	4.1 (39.4)	4.5 (40.1)	7.0 (44.6)	10.0 (50.0)	13.4 (56.1)	16.1 (61.0)	18.1 (64.6)	18.0 (64.4)	15.1 (59.2)	11.4 (52.5)	7.5 (45.5)	4.7 (40.5)	10.8 (51.4)
Mean daily minimum °C (°F)	1.5 (34.7)	1.5 (34.7)	3.1 (37.6)	4.9 (40.8)	8.2 (46.8)	10.7 (51.3)	12.7 (54.9)	12.7 (54.9)	10.5 (50.9)	7.6 (45.7)	4.6 (40.3)	2.2 (36.0)	6.7 (44.1)
Record low °C (°F)	−14.9 (5.2)	−17.8 (0.0)	−9.7 (14.5)	−5.0 (23.0)	−0.9 (30.4)	3.1 (37.6)	4.6 (40.3)	4.6 (40.3)	0.3 (32.5)	−5.8 (21.6)	−7.4 (18.7)	−13.6 (7.5)	−17.8 (0.0)
Average precipitation mm (inches)	66.1 (2.60)	59.9 (2.36)	53.8 (2.12)	38.0 (1.50)	55.5 (2.19)	62.5 (2.46)	74.9 (2.95)	80.6 (3.17)	69.5 (2.74)	68.0 (2.68)	73.9 (2.91)	83.3 (3.28)	786.0 (30.94)
Average relative humidity (%)	86.8	84.1	80.3	74.5	75.6	77.5	78.0	78.4	82.4	85.9	89.0	88.8	81.8
Mean monthly sunshine hours	71.3	92.8	146.3	190.4	218.4	216.7	213.8	198.7	159.3	122.0	75.6	60.3	1,765.6
Percentage possible sunshine	27.3	32.8	39.7	45.9	45.2	43.6	42.8	43.8	41.8	36.8	28.1	24.6	37.7
Source: Royal Netherlands Meteorological Institute
