= Petrus Scriverius =

Dutch writer and scholar (1576–1660)

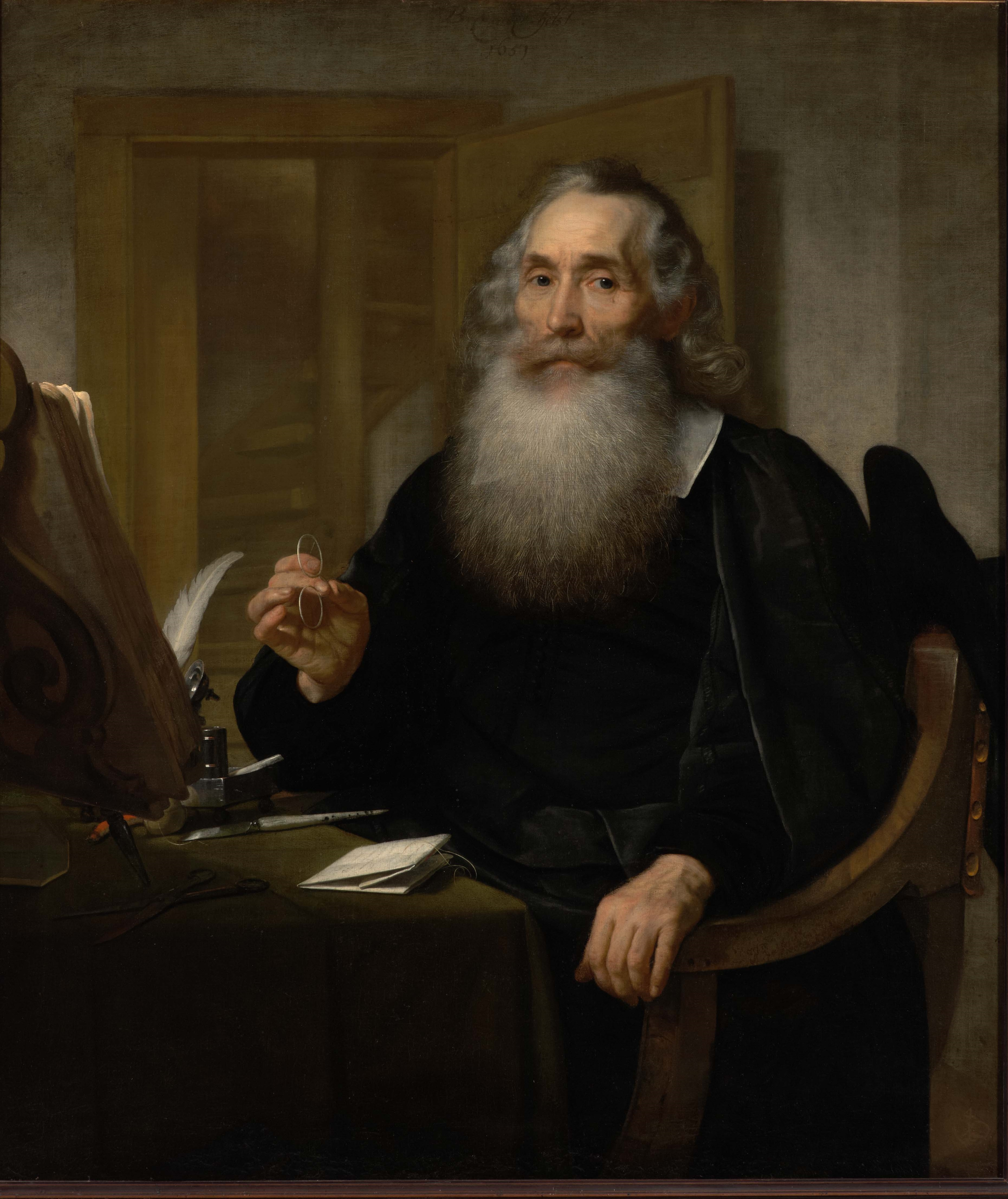
Portrait of Petrus Scriverius by Bartholomeus van der Helst

Petrus Scriverius, the Latinised form of Peter Schrijver or Schryver (12 January 1576 – 30 April 1660), was a Dutch writer and scholar on the history of the Low Countries.

== Life and work ==
He was born at Haarlem and was educated by Cornelis Schoneus at the University of Leiden, where he formed a close intimacy with Daniel Heinsius. In 1599 he completed his studies and in the same year married Anna van der Aar (1576-1656). The couple had many children, of whom only two sons, including Willem Schrijver, survived to adulthood. Thanks to Anna's money and his own family capital, he needed no other source of income and was able to lead a life as an independent scholar. From 1611 to 1613, Scriverius was the headmaster of the Latin School in Duisburg, now Landfermann-Gymnasium.

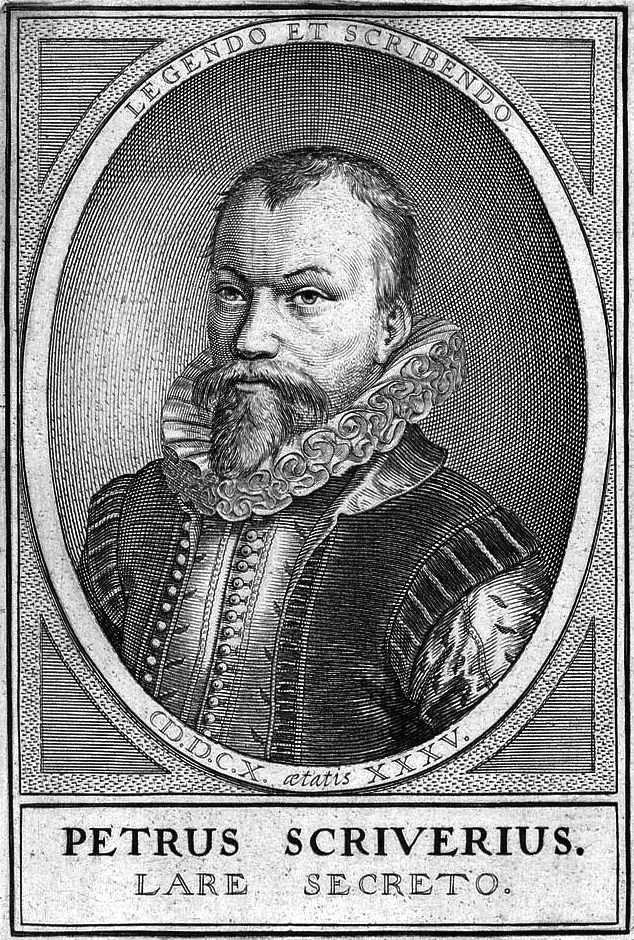
Petrus Scriverius

Scriverius belonged to the political Party of the Dutch States Party of Oldenbarnevelt and Grotius and brought down the displeasure of the government by a copy of Latin verses to honour of their friend, the Remonstrant Leiden pensionaris Rombout Hoogerbeets. Scriverius' poems were considered libelous and he was fined 200 guilders, but when the councilmen came to collect, Scriverius directed them to the kitchen to collect pots and pans, which were not worth enough money. His wife then directed the gentlemen to the books in the library by claiming that it was the books that caused her husband to write the poems and so proceeds from a book sale should pay for the fine on them. Scriverius and his wife enjoyed a long marriage of 57 years and had at least 8 children. Their portraits were painted on the occasion of their 25th wedding anniversary by Frans Hals.

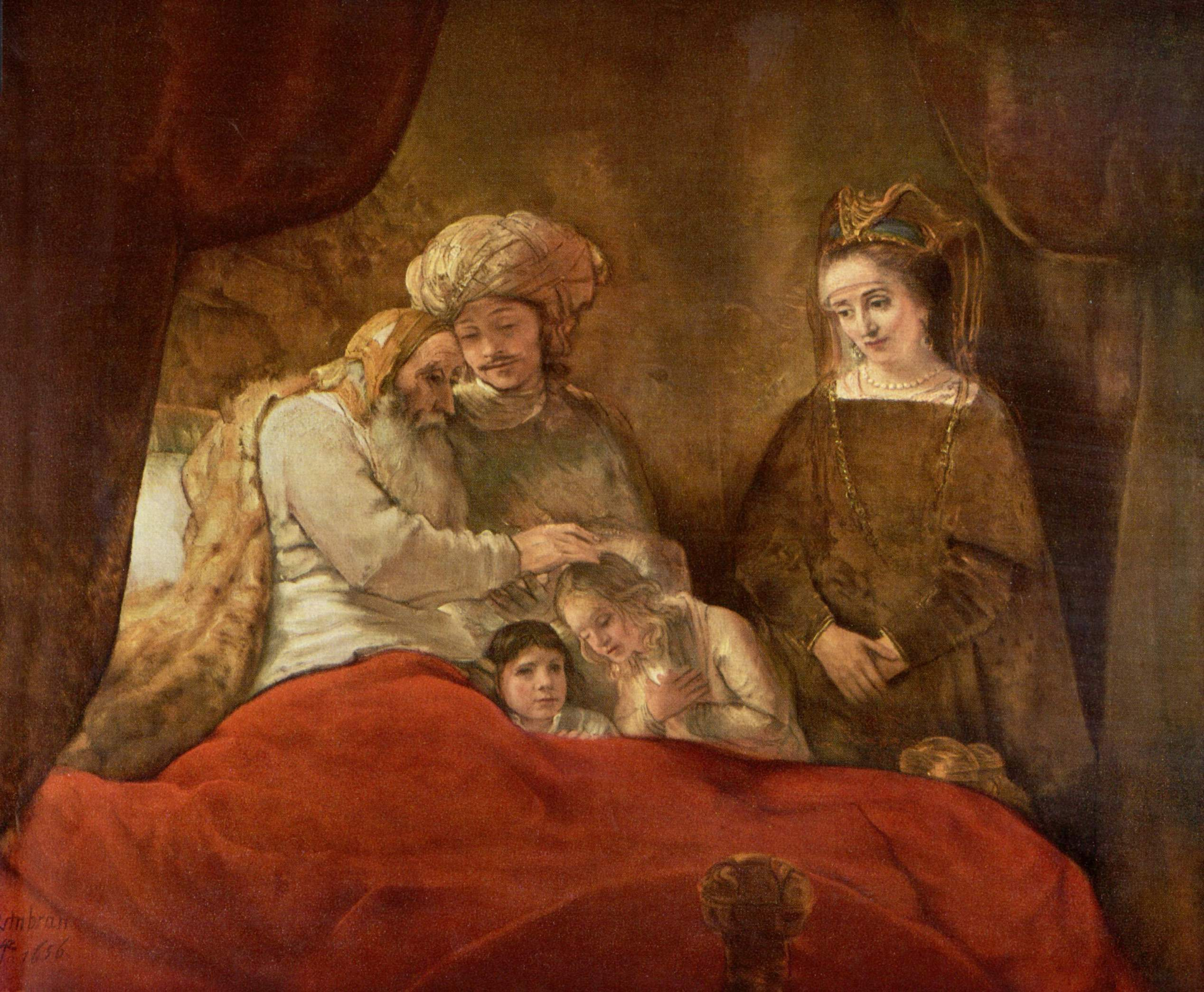
Jacob Blessing the Sons of Joseph by Rembrandt (Portrait of the family of Scriverius and the family of his son Willem Schrijver as biblical characters; 1656)

In 1655/56 Scriverius' son Willem commissioned the artist Rembrandt to paint the Jacob blessing the sons of Joseph. It depicts his family, his father as Jacob, himself with his wife Wendela de Graeff and their two sons, symbolic of Wendela's children from his first and second marriage, as biblical figures.

Most of his life was passed in Leiden, but in 1650 he became blind, and the last years of his life were spent in his son's house at Oudewater, where he died in 1660.

He is best known as a scholar by his notes on Martial, Ausonius, the Pervigilium Veneris; editions of the poems of Joseph Justus Scaliger (Leiden, 1615), of the De re militari of Vegetius Renatus, the tragedies of Seneca (P. Scriverii collectanea veterum tragicorum, 1621), &c. His Opera anecdota, philologica, et poetica (Utrecht, 1738) was edited by A. H. Westerhovius, and his Nederduitsche Gedichten (1738) by S. Dockes.

He made many valuable contributions to the history of Holland: Batavia Illustrata (4 parts, Leiden, 1609); Corte historische Beschryvinghe der Nederlandscher Oorlogen (1612); Inferioris Germaniae . . . historia (1611, 4 parts); Beschryvinghe van Out Batavien (Arnheim, 1612); Het oude Goutsche chronycxken van Hollandt, as editor, and printed at Amsterdam in 1663; and Principes Hollandiae Zelandiae et Frisiae (Haarlem, 1650), translated (1678) into Dutch by Pieter Brugman.

See also Peerlkamp, Vitae Belgarum qui latina carmina scripserunt (Brussels, 1822), and J. H. Hoeufft, Parnassus latino-belgicus (Amsterdam, 1819).

== Marriage pendant portraits by Frans Hals ==
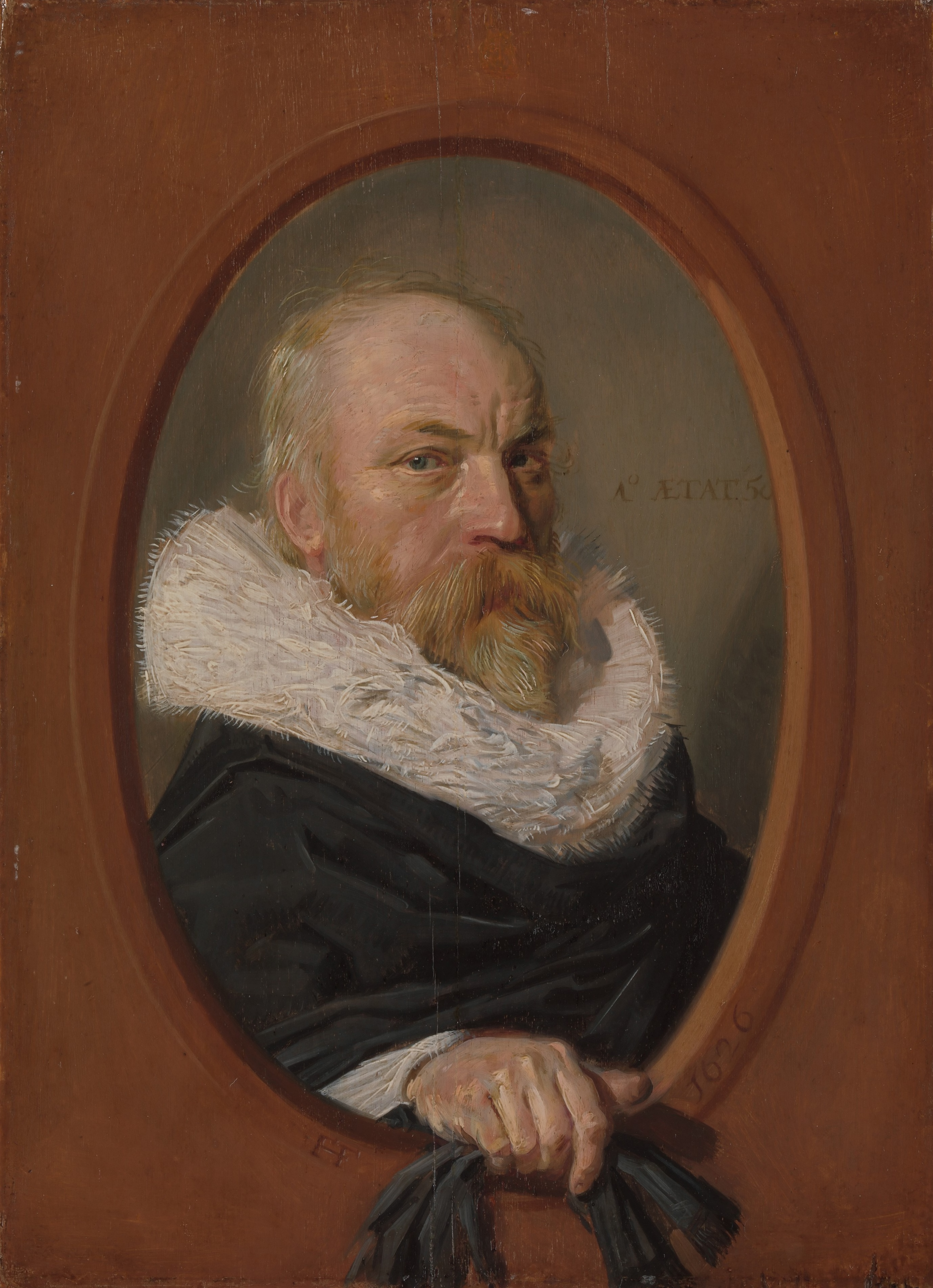
Portrait of Petrus Scriverius

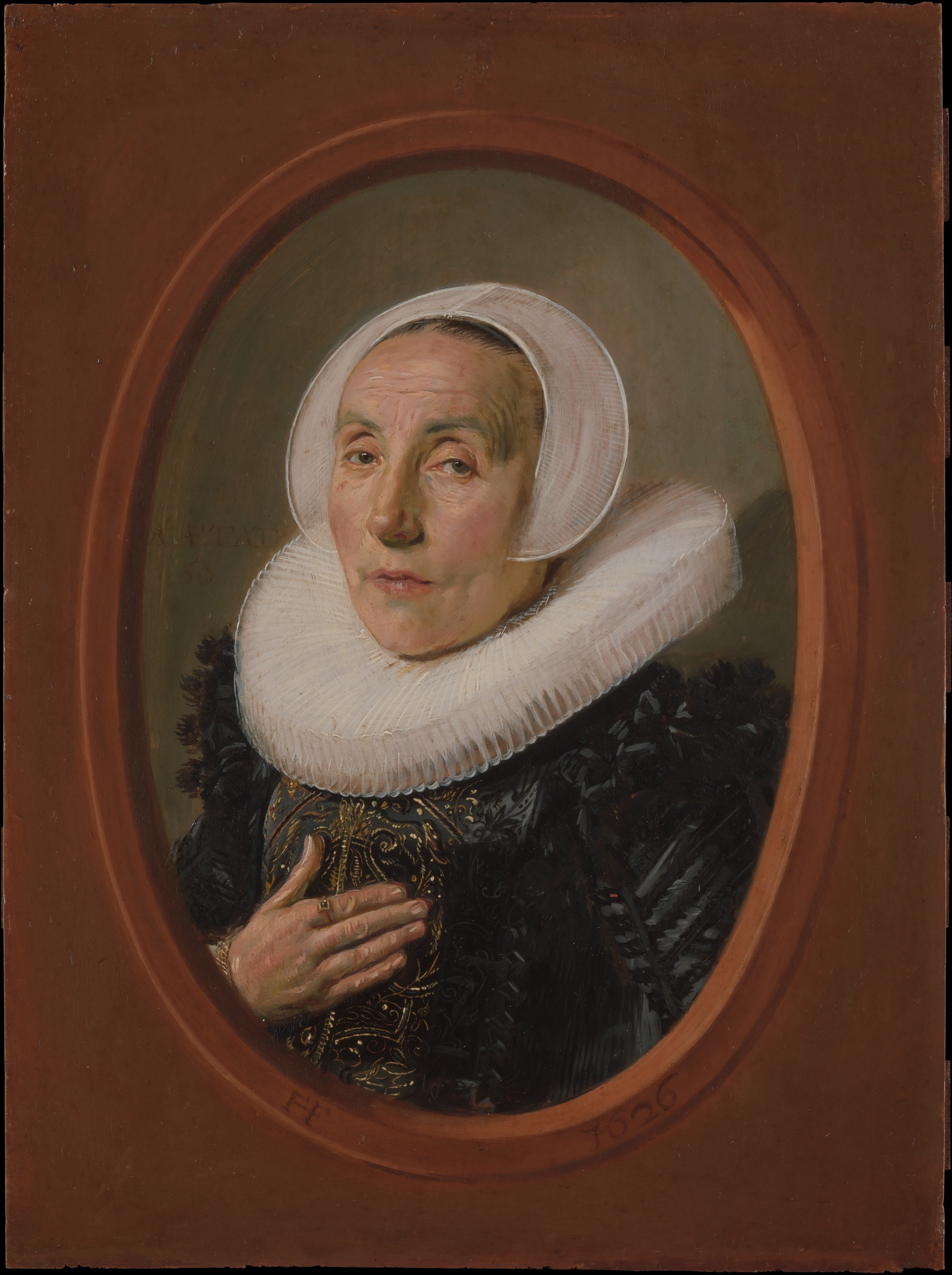
Portrait of Anna van der Aar
