= Watervliet =

Watervliet may refer to:

- Watervliet (Belgium), a village
- Watervliet, Michigan
- Watervliet Township, Michigan
- Watervliet, New York, a city
- Watervliet (town), New York, a former town
- Ridderhofstede (Dutch: knightly estate) van Watervliet, in the Netherlands.

== See also ==
- Watervliet Arsenal, an arsenal in Watervliet, New York
- Hieronymus Lauweryn van Watervliet
- Van Watervliet family, of the Netherlands and New York
- Watervliet Shaker Historic District, Colonie, New York
