= Van Watervliet family =

Dutch noble family

Van Watervliet
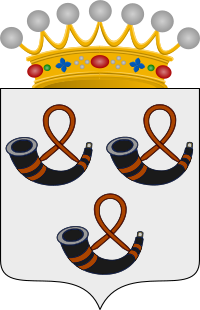
- Country: County of Zeeland; Habsburg Netherlands; Dutch Republic; United Kingdom; United States; Canada
- Origin: Goes, County of Zeeland
- Founded: C. 1560
- Founder: Gillis Cornelissen Brouwer
- Historic seat: Heinkenszand, then Ellewoutsdijk
- Titles: Ridder; Heer (vrijheer) van Watervliet; Heer van Ellewoutsdijk, Everinge, Koudorp, en Driewegen; Heer van 's-Heer Hendrikskinderen; Heer van 's-Heer Arendskerke; Burgemeester van Goes; Schepen van Goes; Schout van Heinkenszand
- Estates: Ridderhofstede ten Watervliet; Slot te Ellewoutsdijk; Slot te 's-Heer Hendrikskinderen
- Cadet branches: Van Everinghe (Van Every/Van Avery)

The Van Watervliet family is a Dutch noble family of businessmen and landowners who rose to prominence during the early Renaissance in the County of Zeeland of the Seventeen Provinces of the Holy Roman Empire, and later in the Netherlands and British colonies of North America.

== Etymology ==
The name "Van Watervliet" means "of the water flow or water meadow" in Dutch. There is no place in Zeeland named "Watervliet", although the mostly-island county is surrounded by the sea and crisscrossed with irrigation canals and farms.

== History ==
=== Origins in Zeeland ===
Gillis Cornelissen Brouwer (c.1529–1591) gained notoriety operating "The Old Brewery" [Dutch: De Oude Brouwerie] outside of Goes. His success enabled him to purchase significant amounts of land, and his prominence in the community led to him being appointed schout of Heinkenszand around 1560. Gillis married first around 1552 to an unknown woman and the union produced one son, Cornelis Gilliss (c. 1552-1612). In 1577 he married Clara lemantsdochter, and that union produced three children, one of whom, Jacobmijnken Gillisdochter, married Jongheer Jan Pietersen van Cats, a member of one of the oldest noble families in the Netherlands. This solidified the Van Watervliet's connection to the Zeeland nobility. It was around 1588 that Gillis began construction of the "knight's manor" [Dutch: ridderhofstede] Watervliet on the southwest side of the main street in Heinkenszand.

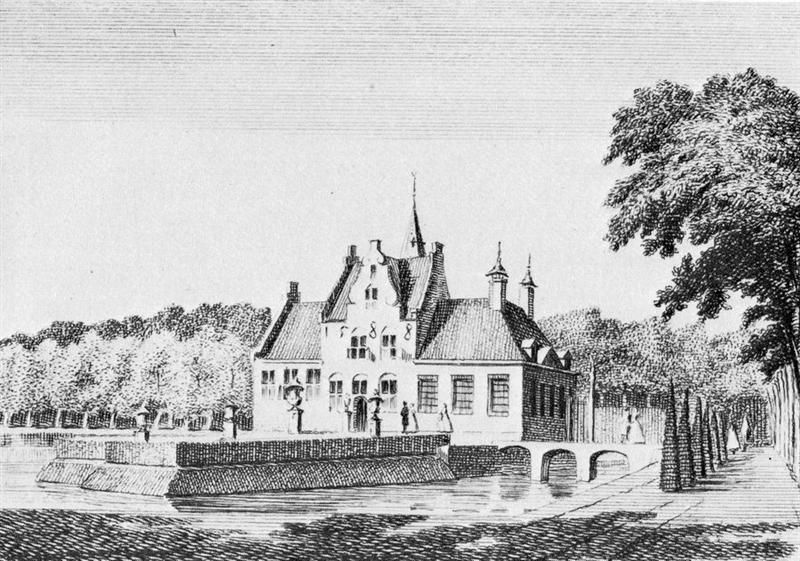
Ridderhofstede Watervliet, c. 1720.

Researchers cannot yet explain the selection of "Watervliet" as the estate name. The closest place named Watervliet is in Flanders in Belgium, approximately 20 miles (30km) from Goes, but there is a Zeeland tie to the lord of that Watervliet: Count Hieronymus Lauweryn van Watervliet served as Treasurer-General of Zeeland from 1499 to 1508. Also, the title is an unusual example of one with no accompanying fief--Gillissen's land was allodial, a vrijheerlijkheid--so the title is attached to Cornelis and his descendants to the present day.

Like his father, Cornelis Gillissen continued to acquire lands, particularly those of expat and extinct noble families, and increase the family's civic involvement. Supporters elected him to serve as a schepen (alderman) and he served as commissioner of the provincial court. From 1539-1611, with interruptions, he served as Burgemeester (mayor) of Goes and a ridder in the States of Zeeland [Dutch: Staten van Zeeland]. From 1539 until his death in 1612, Cornelis also served in the St. Joris Schutterij, including several years as its dean and Captain. It was around 1609 that the family name "Brouwer" fell into disuse and Cornelis is referred to as "Heer van Watervliet."

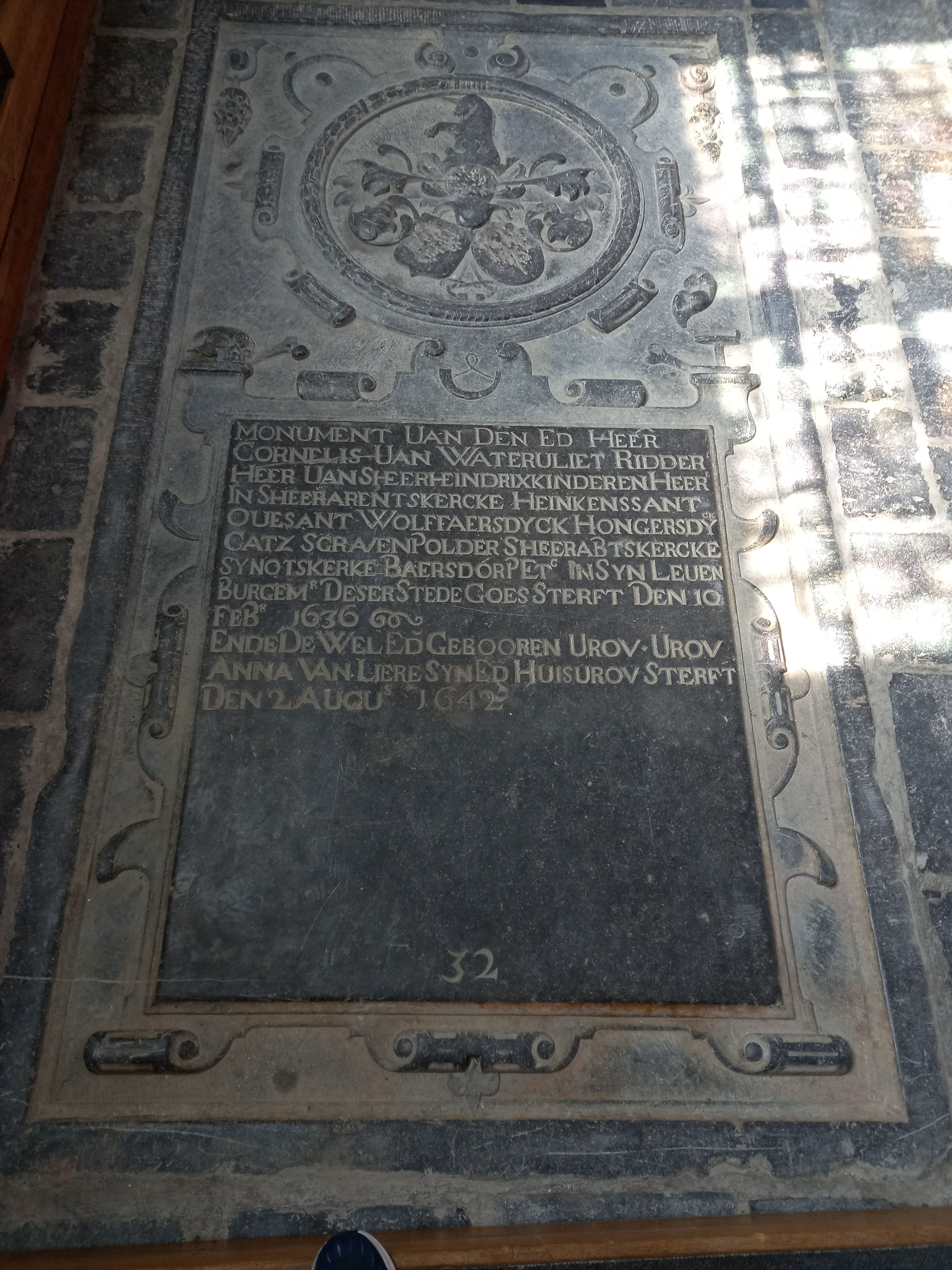
Grave of Cornelis and Anna van Watervliet.

Cornelis married Maria van Campen, and they produced five children, including Cornelia, Gillis, and Cornelis. Cornelia married David van der Nisse, Heer van Nisse, who later served as Burgemeester of Goes. Gillis and Cornelis followed in their father's footsteps as aldermen and mayors of Goes, ridders, and serving on the Court of Auditors of Zeeland [Dutch: Rekenkamer van Zeeland] and in the States. Cornelis married Anna van Liere, they produced four children and share a grave in the Great Church of Mary Magdalene in Goes.

By the middle 17th Century, some Dutch provinces began following the agnatic practice of the Holy Roman Empire where all descendants, male and female, inherited the father's title (but only males could pass it on), so official records of the time referred to all four of Cornelis and Anna's children variously and concurrently as "Heer van Watervliet", and "Heer van Ellewoutsdijk, etc".

In 1651 their daughter Anna Maria wed a Dutch-Czech nobleman, Ferdinand de Perponcher Sedlnitsky, ridder, Freiherr von Choltitz und Fullstein, and a cousin of Hendrik George de Perponcher Sedlnitsky. In adulthood, Cornelis and Anna's sons, Cornelis and Emmery, served as councilmen and mayors of Goes, and Cornelis and Frederik served on the Gecommitteerde Raad van Zeeland (State Council). Frederik married an unknown woman in secret, possibly a commoner, and produced two sons for certain, Myndert and Carsten, and maybe a third, Rynier. Emmery, the eldest son of Cornelis and Anna, produced no male heirs and made arrangements for the estate to be passed to Anna Maria and Ferdinand on the condition at least one of their children bear the Van Watervliet surname.

=== In North America ===
Mentions of the Van Watervliets in the records of Zeeland gradually disappear in the 18th Century, while Myndert and Carsten start a new chapter of the family history in the New Netherland settlement of Beverwijck around 1655. As Lutherans, their move to North America may have been prompted by a 1619 law that limited membership in the highest level of government, the Ridderschap, to members of the Reformed Church. If true, it would not be the family's last tangle with Calvinists. In moving they also deployed another family name, Van Everinghe, invoking their ancient and more prestigious title of Heer van Ellewoutsdijk, Everinghe, Koudorp, en Driewegen, which was the second largest barony in Zeeland at the time and dates to the 13th Century. Due to non-standardized spelling and Anglicization of names over time, they and their descendants appear in records variously under the names Van Iveren, Van Yveren, Van Every, Van Evera, and Van Avery, with or without the space and sometimes with the "between-joiner" "van" treated as an additional given name or abbreviated as an initial.

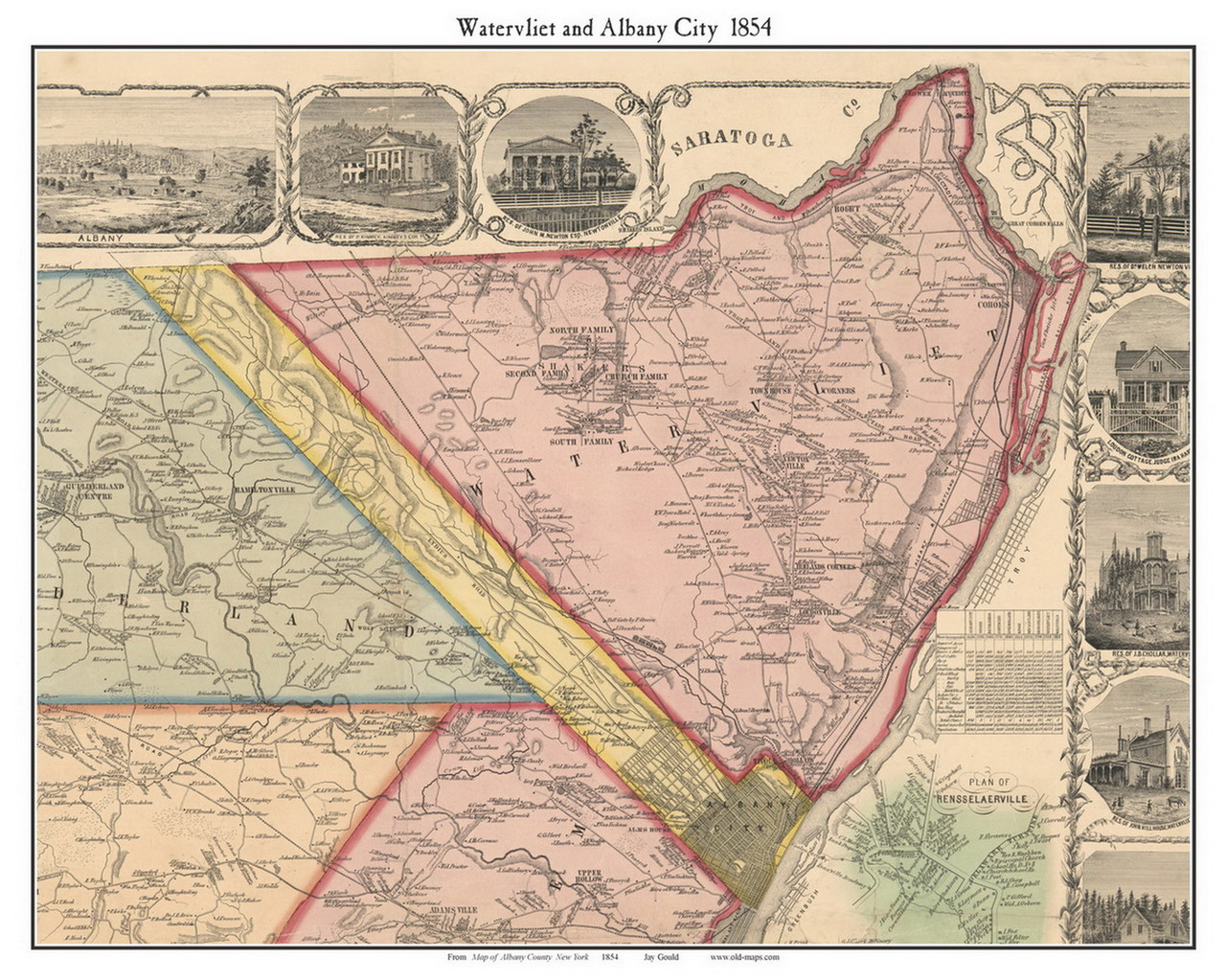
Watervliet, NY, in 1854.

As Van Watervliets, Myndert and Carsten immediately started businesses as blacksmiths and fur traders to fund land purchases in the colony, with Rynier acting as their agent in Amsterdam. Myndert served as an alderman and elder in the Lutheran church, and in 1673 he and four other prominent Lutherans sent a letter to the Governor-General of New Netherland asking that Lutherans' free exercise of religion not be curtailed by the colony or Reformed Church. The request was granted. Eventually Myndert secured a warrant from Governor Thomas Dongan, 2nd Earl of Limerick, to provide all the arms and armor for Fort Orange, and joined the Albany Convention, with Governors Nicholas Bayard and Stephanus Van Cortlandt, and another Dutch nobleman, Frederick Philipse, seeking to restore the rule of William III of England (and probably not coincidentally, also Stadtholder of the Dutch Republic) against Leisler's Rebellion during the Glorious Revolution. Myndert is also noted as a close associate of Jeremias van Rensselaer, Patroon of the Manor of Rensselaerwyck, and attended his funeral.

The original Town of Watervliet on the banks of the Hudson River that became the City of Watervliet, New York, is likely named after the family's estate in Goes, Netherlands.

== Other notable members ==
- Rynier Van Every (1718-deceased). 8th generation. A staunch supporter of the American Revolution, he was a member of the New York Sons of Liberty and chairman of the Schenectady Committee of Correspondence throughout the war. In 1777 he was elected Senator representing the Western Division of the New York Assembly.
- Rynier Van Iveren (1728-deceased). 8th generation. Served in Van Rensselaer's Regiment of militia during the American Revolution, first as an Ensign and later as a Lieutenant, including at the Battles of Saratoga.
- Arms of the United Empire Loyalists' Association of Canada
  McGregory Van Every (1723–1786). 8th generation. A staunch Loyalist during the American Revolution, he was twice arrested by colonial authorities for his "Tory tendencies." Two of his sons enlisted first in the Continental Army with their cousin Martin (see next entry), but later deserted for a Loyalist militia. McGregory himself is listed as a member of Butler's Rangers. He eventually led a group of Van Everys to Niagara in Canada and was named a United Empire Loyalist by Guy Carleton, 1st Baron Dorchester and Governor of Quebec.
- Martin Van Every (1759–1816). 9th generation. Served under George Washington from 1775 to 1780, first in the New York Line and later in Malcolm's and Grayson's Additional Continental Regiments, fighting in the New York and New Jersey, Philadelphia, and Yorktown campaigns, including wintering at Valley Forge.
- Peter Van Every (1795–1859) was an American farmer, merchant, and politician who served in the Michigan House of Representatives in the first years of Michigan's statehood.
- Salem A. Van Every (1884–1943). 12th generation. He was a business partner and Son-in-law of Phillip Lance, founder of Lance, Inc. Following the death of Lance, Salem incorporated the company and expanded it to a $9 million business. He introduced the first commercially-produced peanut butter cracker.
- Dale Van Every (1896–1976) was an American writer, film producer, and studio executive.
- Phillip L. Van Every (1913–1980). 13th generation. Son of Salem A. Van Every. Upon the retirement of Salem, Phillip took over Lance, Inc., and further expanded it to a business with 4,500 employees in 34 states and $80 million in annual sales. He also founded the Phillip L. Van Every Foundation, which supports North Carolina charities and businesses.
- Kermit Van Every (March 5, 1915 – November 20, 1998) was a noted American aeronautical engineer best known for his work in the area of very high-speed flight. He was a fellow of the American Institute of Aeronautics and Astronautics and had the unusual distinction of receiving the Wright Brothers Medal twice, in 1948 and 1958.
- Harold Van Every (1918–2007) was an American football back in the National Football League (NFL) who played 21 games for the Green Bay Packers. During World War II, he was a bomber pilot assigned to 510th Squadron, 447th Bomb Group, Eighth Air Force, flying the Boeing B-17 Flying Fortress heavy bomber. During a raid in 1944 he was shot down by flak and spent nearly a year in Stalag Luft III until it was liberated in 1945.
- Stephen Van Evera (1948– ) is an American political scientist and professor of Political Science at the Massachusetts Institute of Technology, specializing in international relations. His research includes U.S. foreign and national security policy as well as causes and prevention of war. He is a member of the Council on Foreign Relations.
- James C. Van Avery (unknown). An inventor and engineer with the Boeing Corporation who holds six patents for various aviation technologies.
- CDR Christopher E. Van Avery, USN (Ret) (1968– ) 16th generation. Head of house since 2024. Served in the U.S. Navy and Navy Reserve (1986–2017); Military Advisor to the Assistant Secretary of State for Political-Military Affairs, 2016–2017; Military Professor at the Asia-Pacific Center for Security Studies, 2009–2012; Asia-Pacific Center for Security Studies Fellow; prompted and contributed to the U.S. military's 2011 overhaul of its Principles of War; political and social commentator; geopolitical analyst; contributor to The Western Journal, Proceedings, Armed Forces Journal, and Navy Times.
- Jonathan E. Van Every (1979– ) is a former Major League Baseball (MLB) outfielder and Director of Operations for the College of the Holy Cross baseball team in Worcester, MA.

== Arms ==
The arms of the Van Watervliet family (pictured in the infobox above) consist of three black hunting horns on a white background, or in heraldic terms, Argent, three hunting horns Sable.

The modern arms of the Van Avery branch reflect the longer heritage of the line. The cross represents their long history of membership in and support for the Church. The spurs represent their membership as ridders in the States of Zeeland for almost two hundred years, and the ships and compartment of waves represent their connection with the sea and ocean trade. The beavers represent industry and the importance of family as well as the family's new home in New Netherlands and activity in the beaver trade. Finally, the coronet represents their rank as barons in the nobility of the Dutch Republic.

== Important Van Watervliet descendants ==
Gillis Cornelissen Brouwer (1529-1591)
  - Cornelis Gillissen Brouwer (1552-1612), from c.1609, 1st Heer van Watervliet
    - Cornelia van Watervliet (1585-1652) married David van der Nisse, Heer van der Nisse
    - Gillis van Watervliet (1588-1635), ridder
      - Cornelis van Watervliet (1619-1640), ridder
    - Isabella van Watervliet (1591-1646)
    - Cornelis van Watervliet (1592-1636), ridder, also Baron van Ellewoutsdijk, etc....
      - Anna Maria van Watervliet (c.1612-1670), married Ferdinand de Perponcher Sedlnitsky, ridder, Freiherr von Choltitz und Fullstein
      - Cornelis Cornelissen van Watervliet (c.1613-1669)
      - Frederik van Watervliet (c.1615-1677)
        - Myndert van Watervliet (van Everinghe) (c.1636-1706)
          - Burger Myndertse Van Iveren (c.1660-c.1720)
            - Marten Meynderts Van Iveren (1685-1760)
              - McGregory Van Every (1723-1786) - founder of the Van Every cadet branch, still extant in North America, but forfeited titles for himself and his descendants by pledging loyalty to King George III.
            - Myndert Burger Van Iveren (c.1692-c.1764)
              - Burger Van Iveren (1704-1789)
                - Martin Van Every (1759-1816)
                  - Martin Van Avery (1792-1880) - first of the Van Avery cadet branch, still extant in North America
        - Carsten van Watervliet (van Everinghe) (c.1637-1688) - line extinct in North America c.1738
        - Rynier van Watervliet (unconfirmed)
      - Emmery van Watervliet (1620-1685)
        - Anna Maria van Watervliet (1670-1684)
    - Jaques van Watervliet (1594-unknown)
  - Jacobmijnken Gillisdochter, married Jongheer Jan Pietersen van Cats
  - leman Gillissen
  - Mayken Gillisdochter

== Style & Usage ==
=== Style ===
Following the Dutch tradition, members of the family in English-speaking regions would use the title "Baron/Baroness van Watervliet" after their surname, and honorific "The Right Noble Lord" (Dutch: De Weledele Heer/vrouwe) before their given names. Written out, this style would appear as:

The Right Noble Lord GivenNames Surname, Baron of Watervliet

The honorific "The High-born Lord/Lady" is only used in the most formal circumstances, and usually only in writing. In conversation the form of address differed. Formally, "Noble Honorable Lord" (Dutch:Edel Achtbare Heer) was used, and informally "Honorable Lord" or "My Lord" (Dutch: Mijnheer/Vrouwe).

=== Usage ===
While living members of the family are entitled to use the style under the law of the Republic of the Seven United Netherlands, modern usage varies from place to place. The title is not recognized in the modern Netherlands, possibly because no living members of the family resided in the country to petition for recognition when the nobility there was re-established in 1814. In the United States, while legally permitted but not recognized, it is very rare for nobles to employ their titles in a routine fashion and frowned upon in some circles. In other countries, particularly ones that had or have a nobility of their own, like Austria, use of titles may also be frowned upon or even barred by law.

== Gallery ==
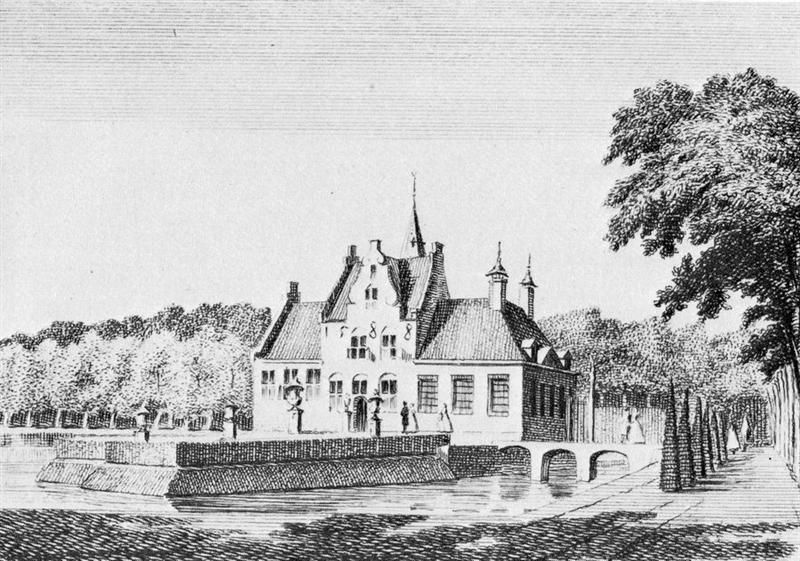
The Van Watervliet estate near Goes, Netherlands, c. 1730.

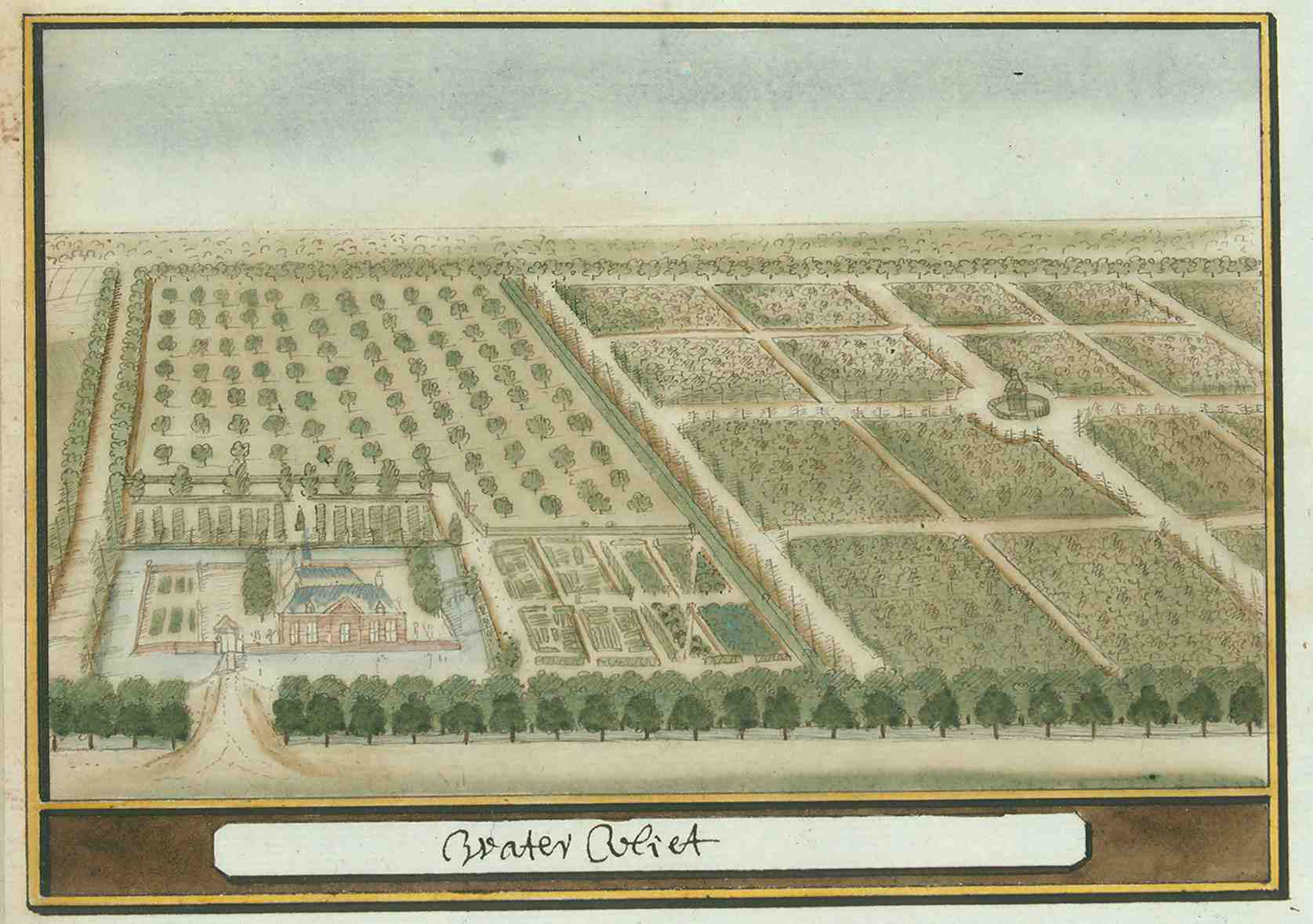
The Van Watervliet estate c. 1720.

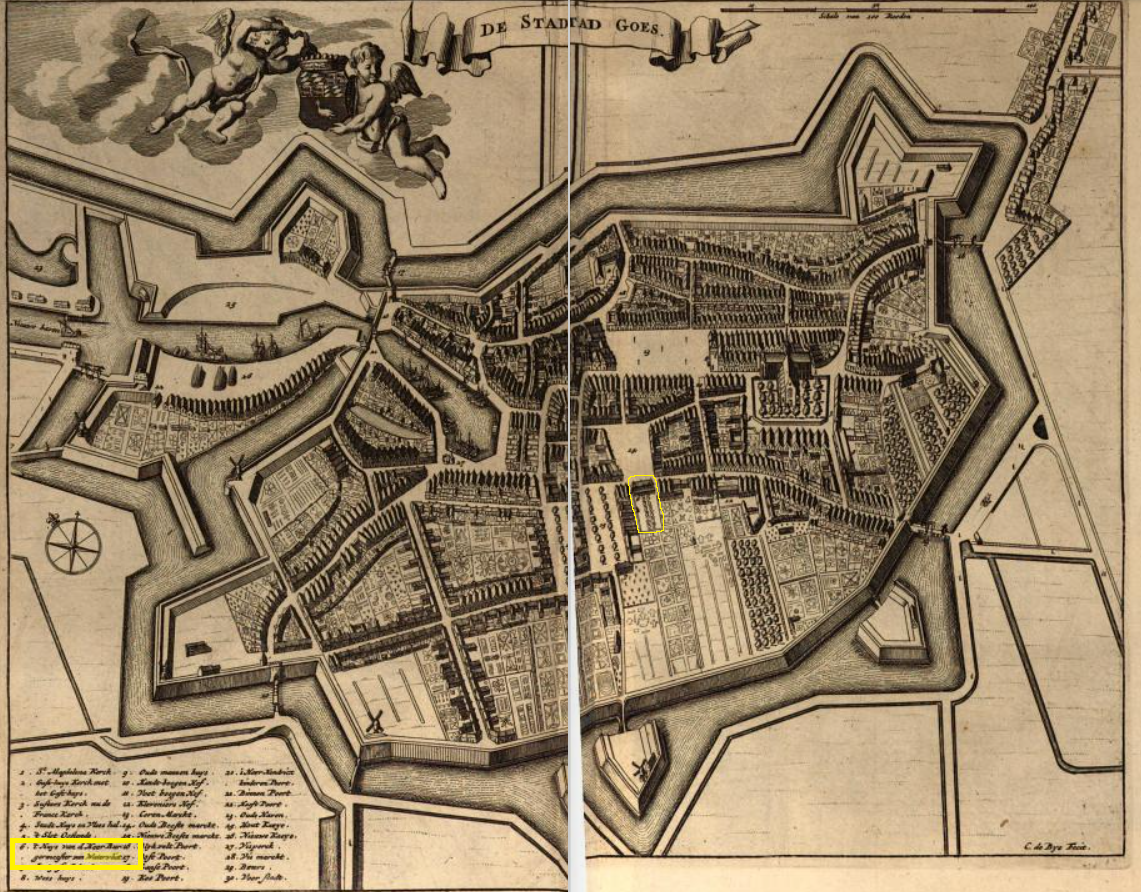
Map of Goes, Zeeland, showing the location of the Van Watervliet manor house

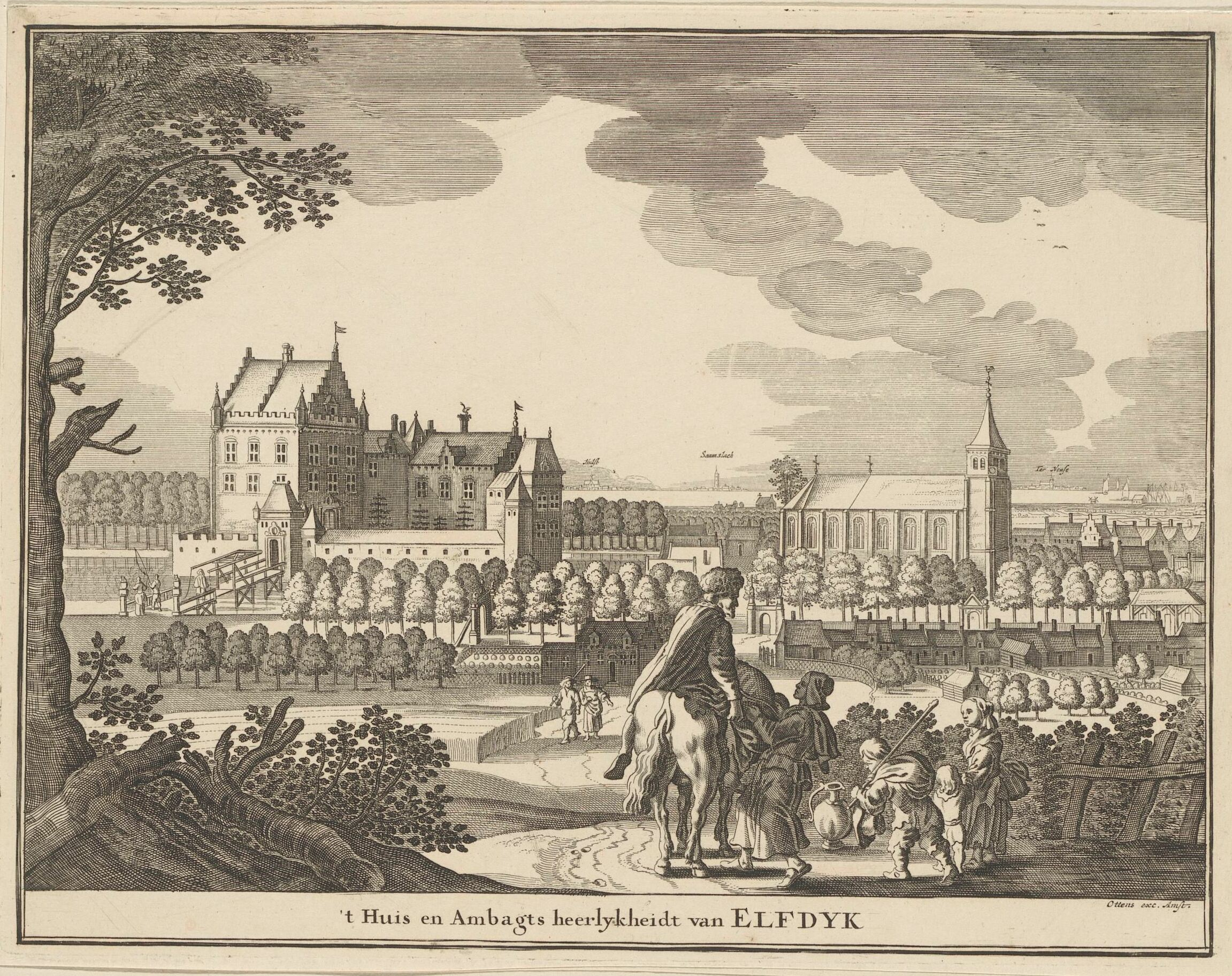
Slot (castle) ten Ellewoutsdijk, c. 1500

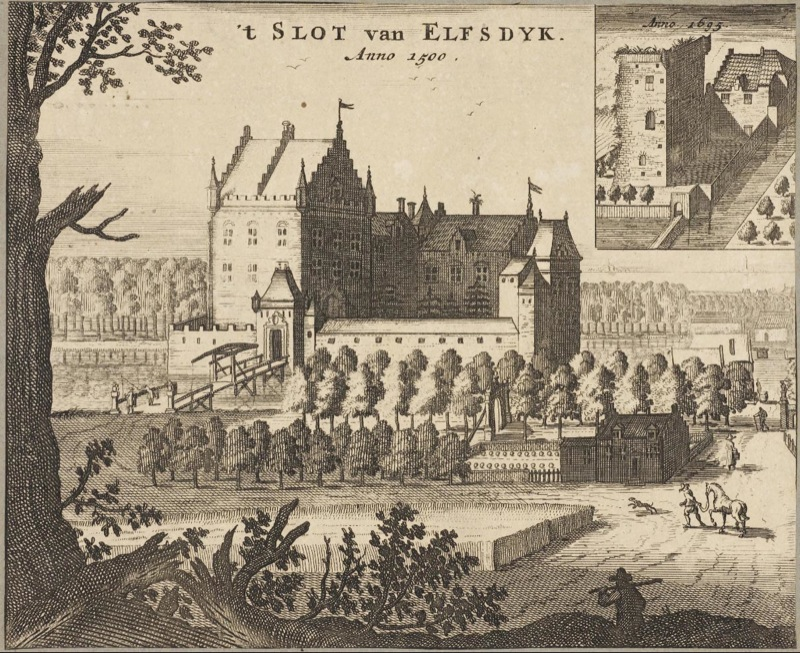
Ellewoutsdijk in 1500 and 1695.

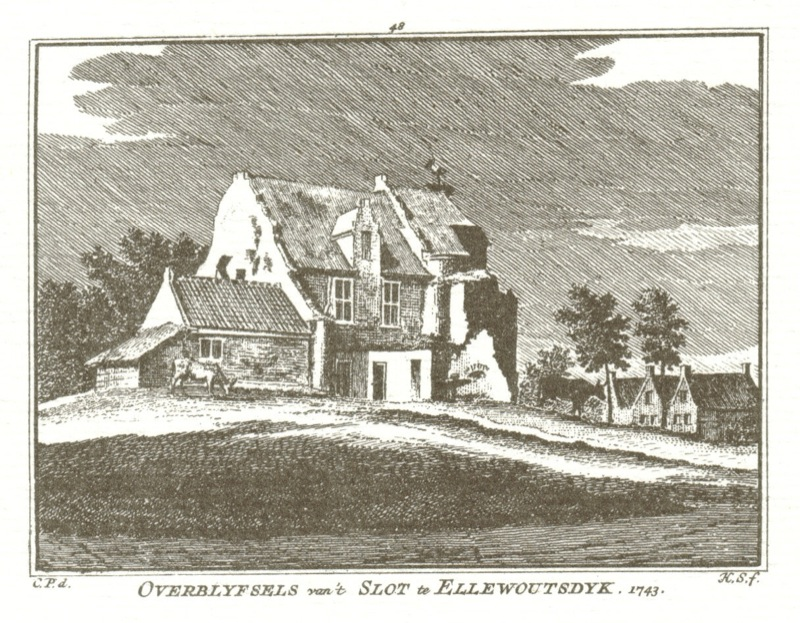
Ellewoutsdijk in 1743

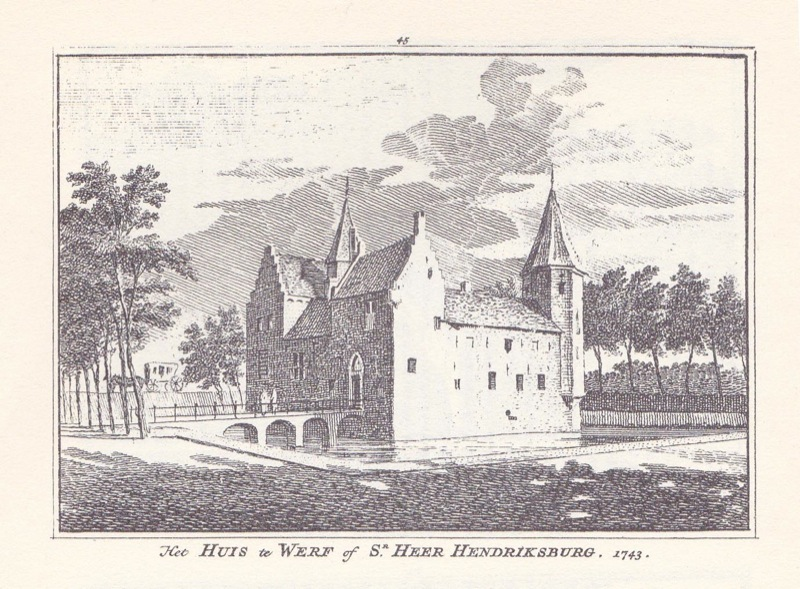
Castle at 's-Heer Hendrikskinderen

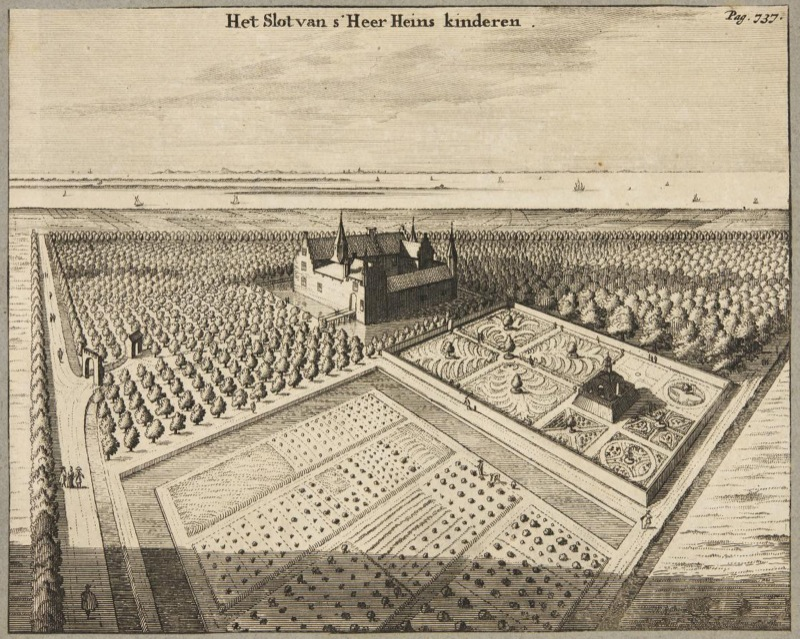
Castle at 's-Heer Hendrikskinderen

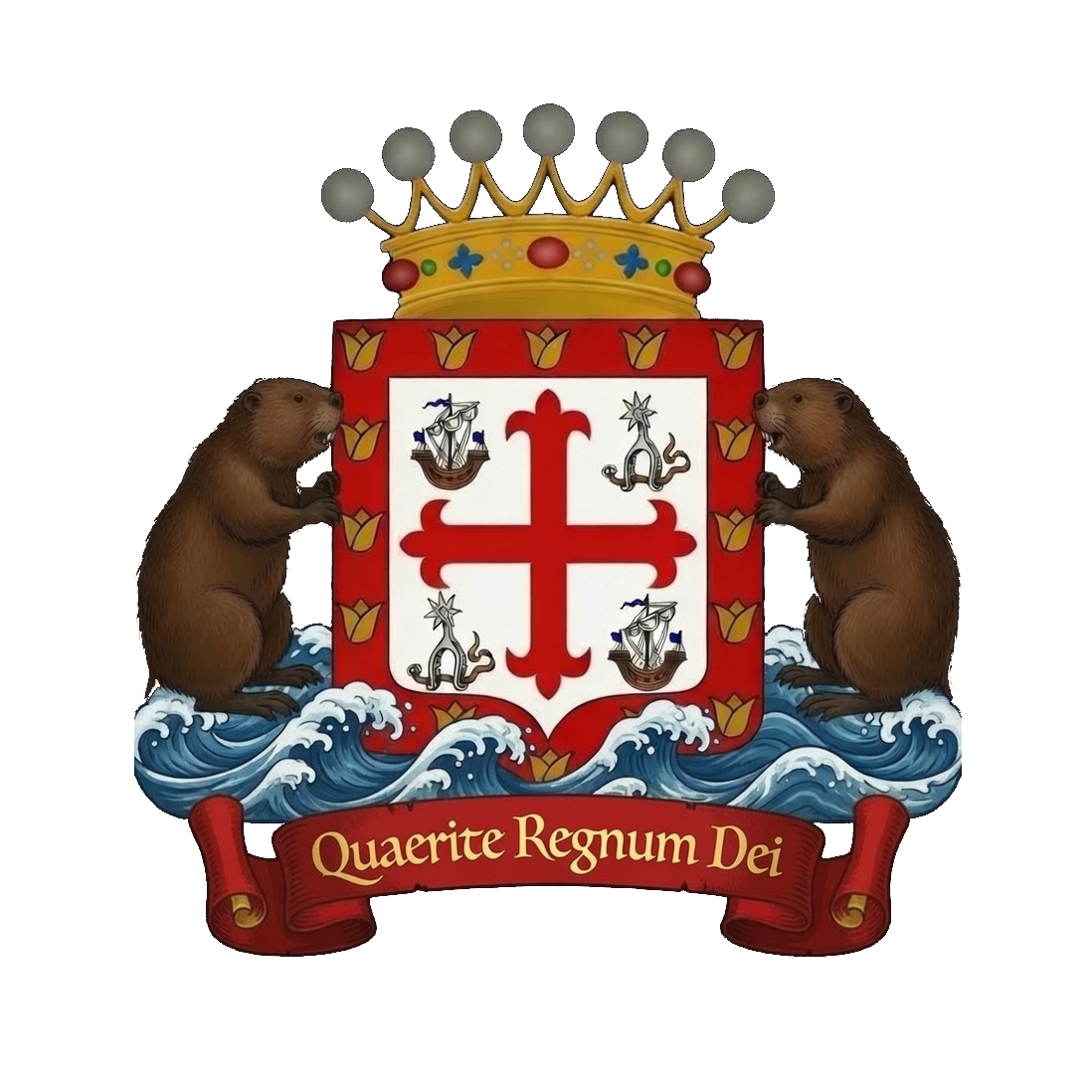
The achievement of the Van Avery van Watervliet family

Arms of the Van Avery branch

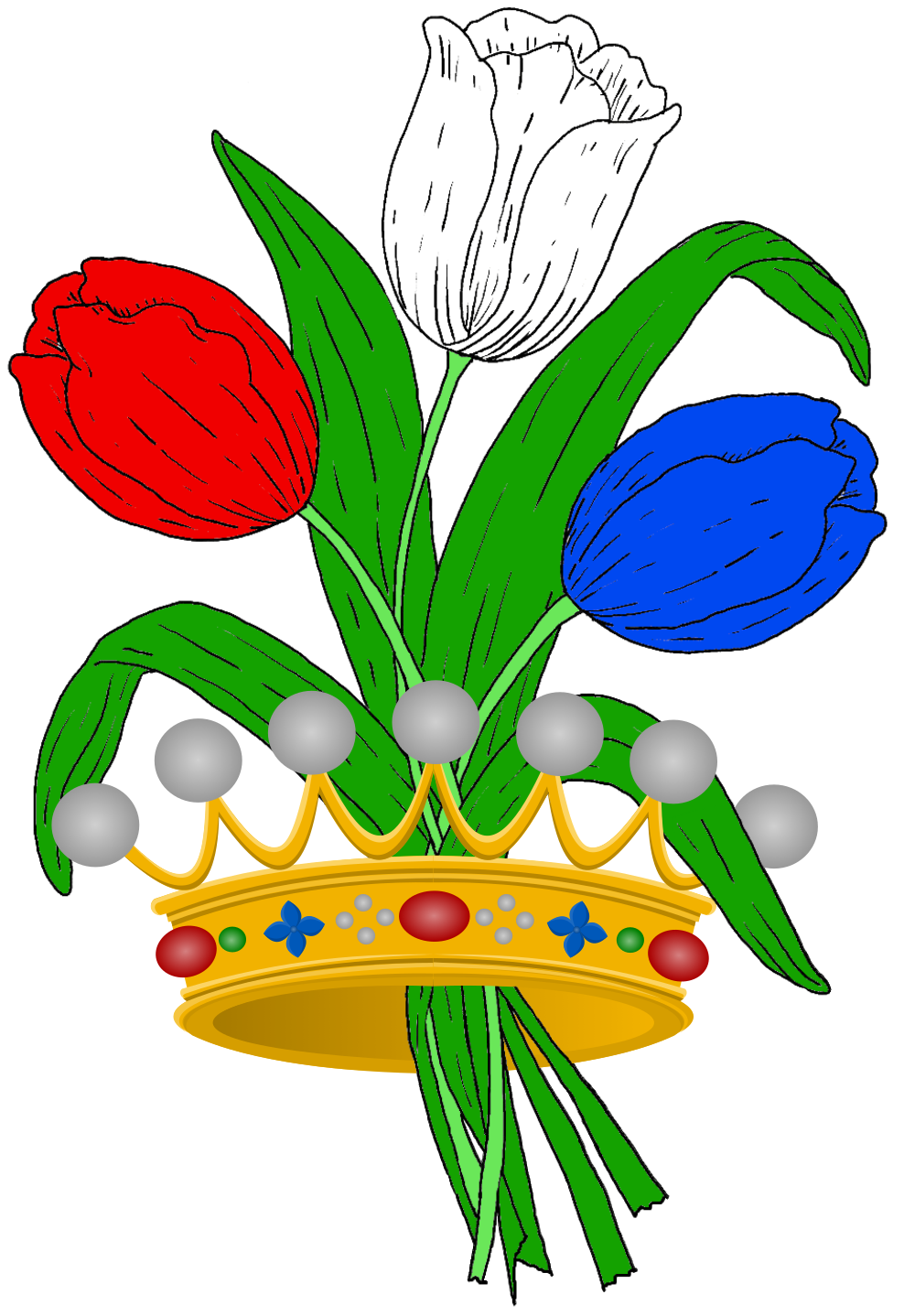
Badge of the Van Avery branch
