= Philippine, Netherlands =

City in Zeeland, Netherlands

Philippine
- Small city
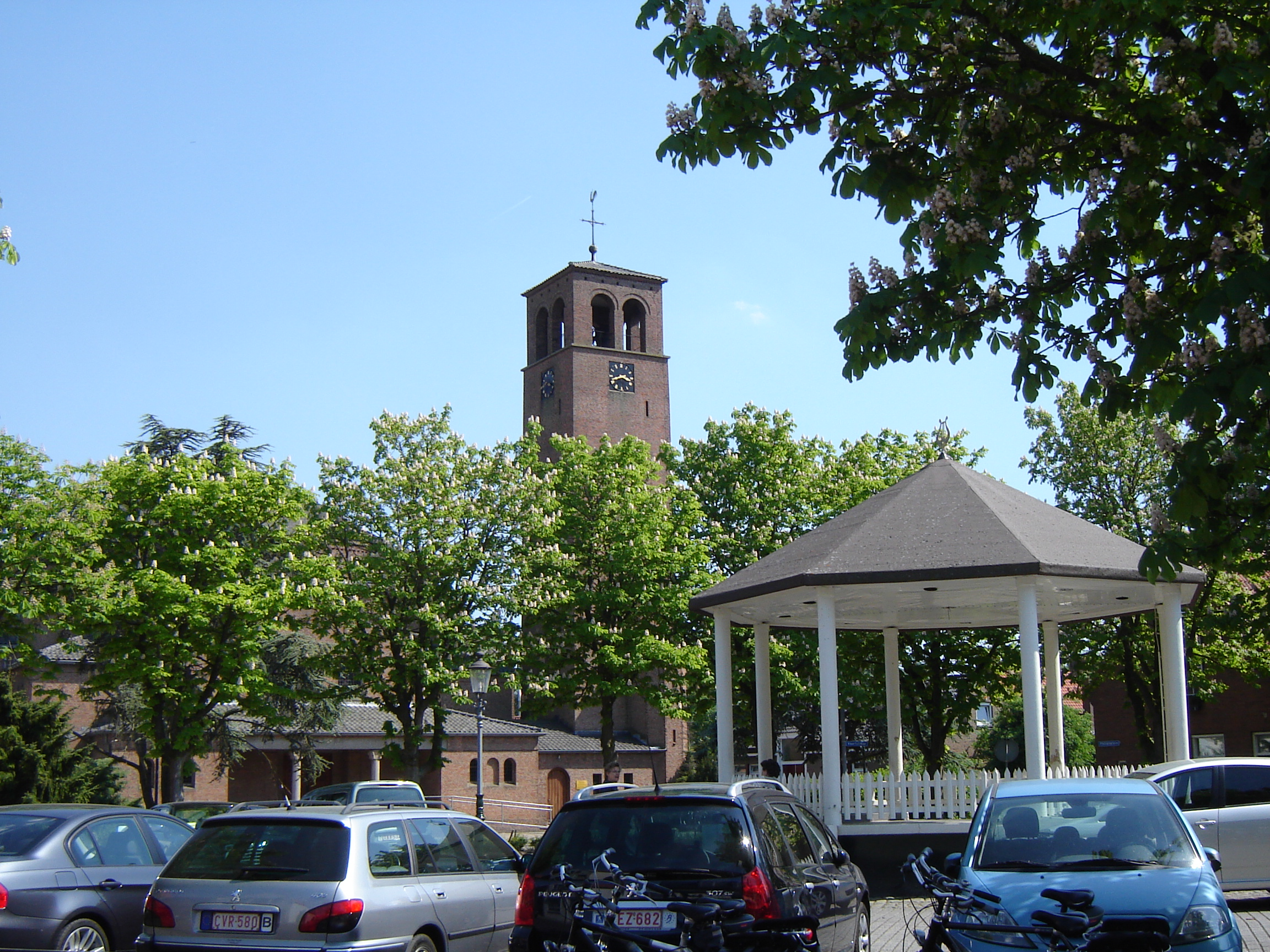
- Philippine square with bandstand

- Flag Coat of arms

- Location in the province of Zeeland in the Netherlands Philippine (Netherlands)
- Coordinates: 51°16′58″N 3°45′31″E
- Country: Netherlands
- Province: Zeeland
- Municipality: Terneuzen

Area
  - Total: 21.04 km^{2} (8.12 sq mi)
- Elevation: 2.3 m (7.5 ft)

Population (2021)
  - Total: 2,085
  - Density: 99.10/km^{2} (256.7/sq mi)
- Time zone: UTC+01:00 (CET)
  - Summer (DST): UTC+02:00 (CEST)
- Postal code: 4553
- Dialing code: 0115

Philippine is a small city in the province of Zeeland, the Netherlands. It lies about 23 kilometres (14 mi) southeast of Vlissingen. It is located on the border with Belgium, 5 kilometres (3.1 mi) southwest of the city of Terneuzen. It received city rights in 1506.

== History ==
The landlord, Hieronymus Lauweryn, who founded the town in 1505, named it after Philip the Handsome. A fortress was built with a triangular market square. In 1599, a harbour was constructed, and the economy became based on fishing. Philippine was captured by the Dutch Republic in 1633.

The new Assumption of Mary Church was built in 1924 to replace the older church, which has now become a supermarket. It is a domed church with a square tower. The church was destroyed during World War II in 1944 and rebuilt in 1954.

Mussel fishing expanded in the Philippines in 1939 after fishermen from Boekhoute, Belgium, relocated there due to the silting of their river. The town remained a separate municipality until merging into Sas van Gent in 1970, later becoming part of Terneuzen in 2003. It remains well known for its mussel restaurants and a mussel-shaped fountain in the central square.

== Gallery ==
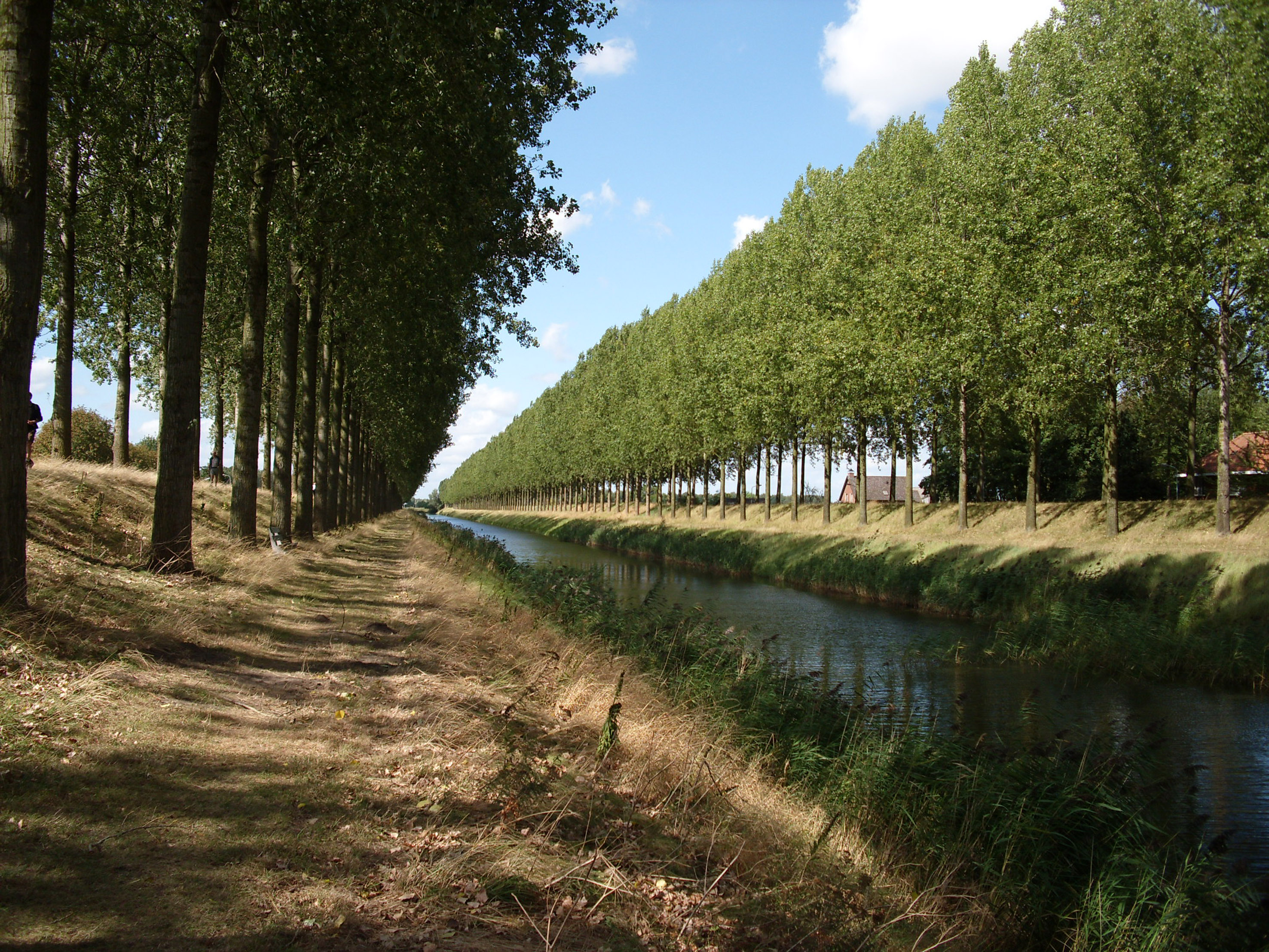
This canal runs adjacent to the northeast boundary of Philippine

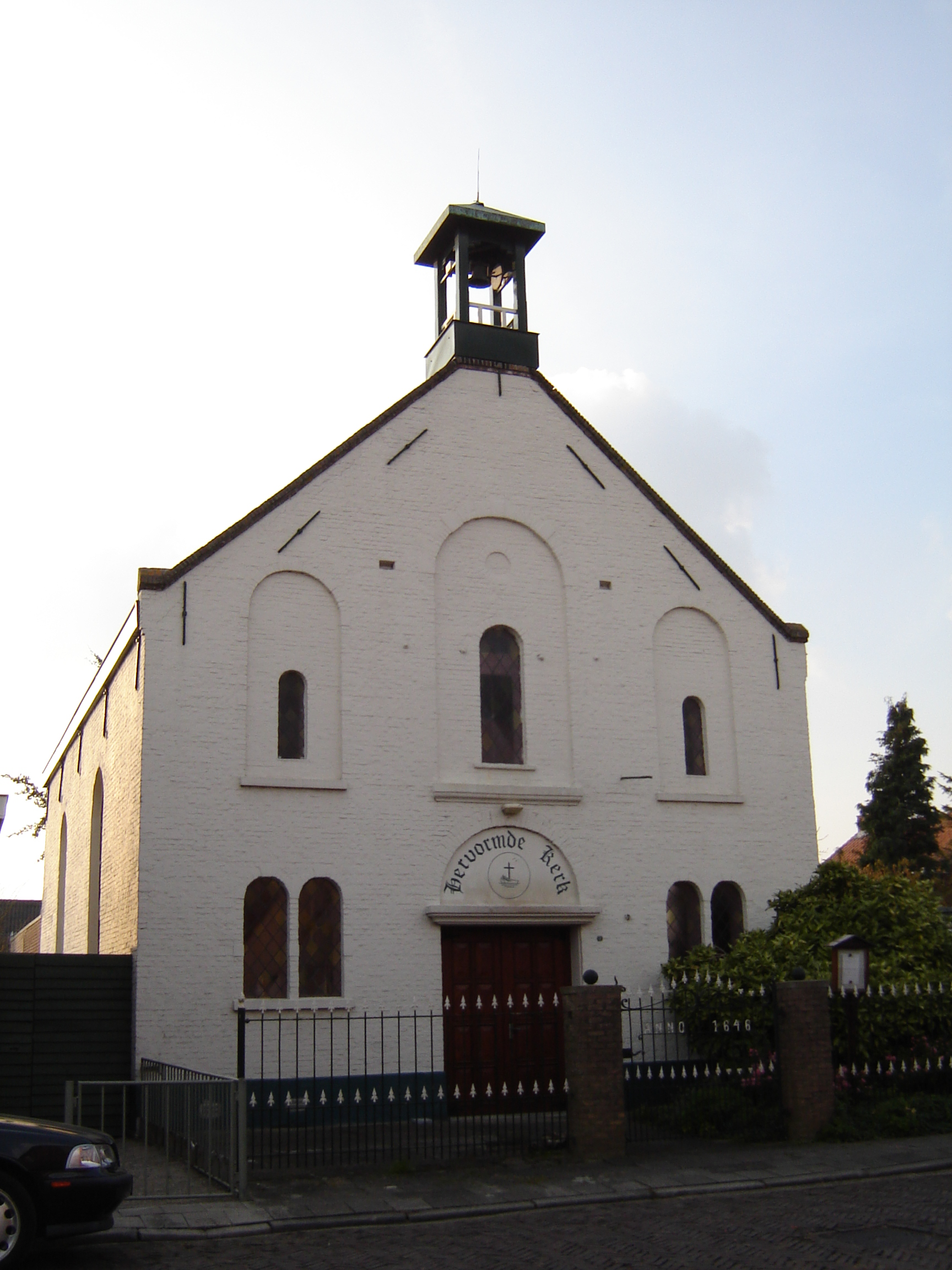
Reformed Church in Philippine

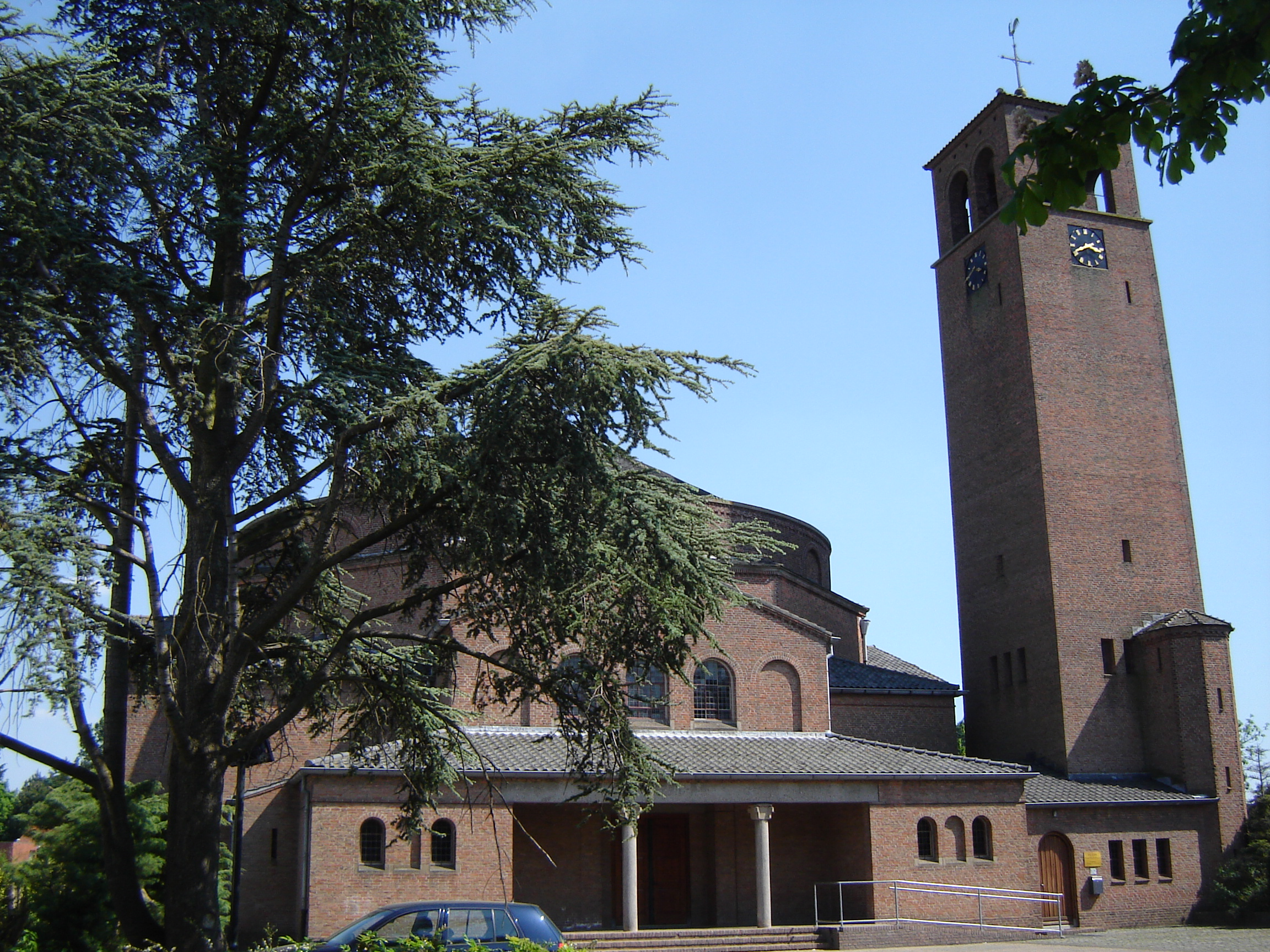
Catholic church of Our Lady at the St. Philips Square
