= Sint-Laureins =

- Municipality
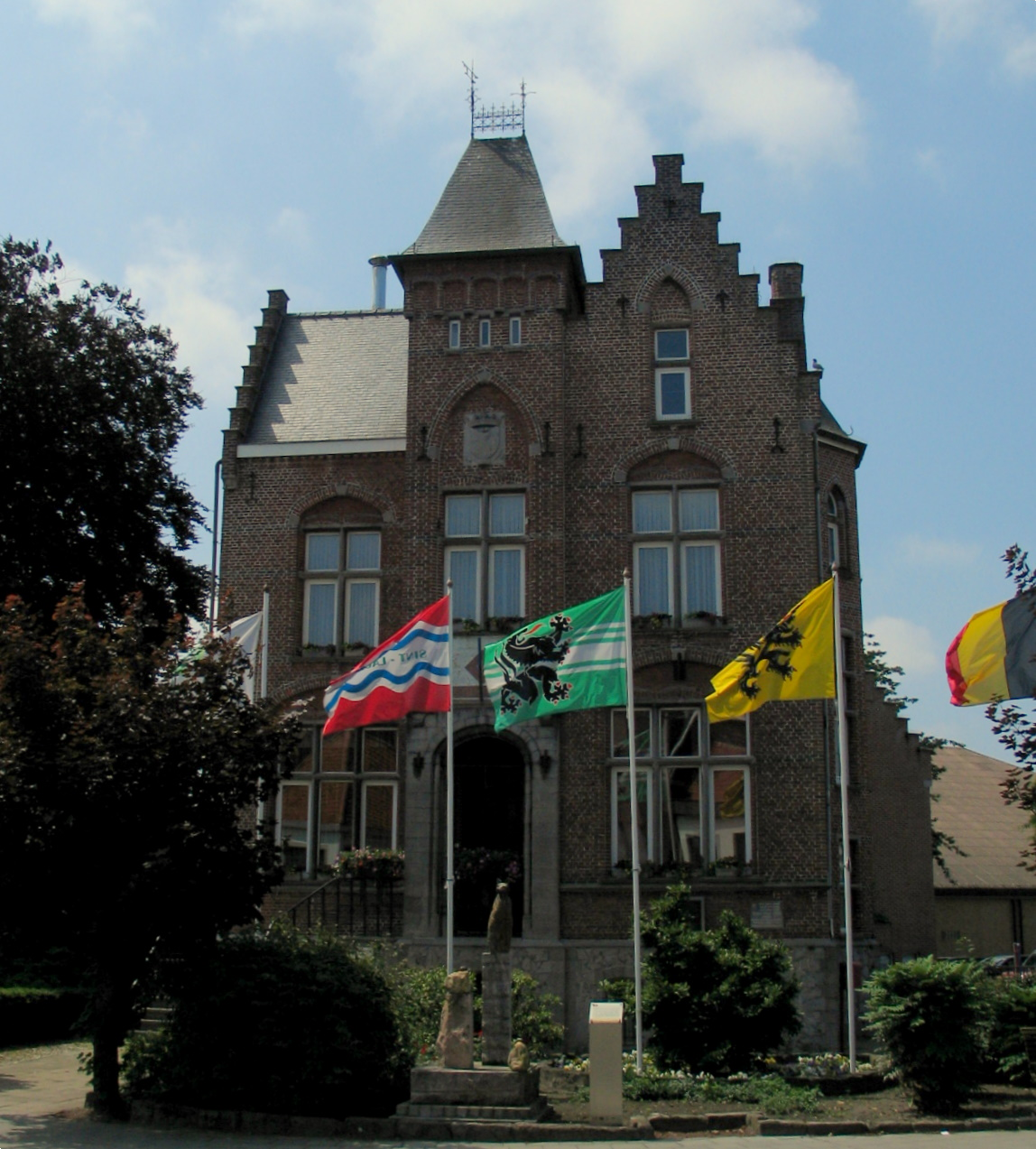
- Sint-Laureins town hall

- Flag Coat of arms

- Location of Sint-Laureins in East Flanders
- Interactive map of Sint-Laureins
- Location in Belgium
- Coordinates: 51°15′N 03°31′E
- Country: Belgium
- Community: Flemish Community
- Region: Flemish Region
- Province: East Flanders
- Arrondissement: Eeklo

Government
  - Mayor: Franki Van de Moere (Samen Anders)
  - Governing party: Samen Anders

Area
  - Total: 74.54 km^{2} (28.78 sq mi)

Population (2018-01-01)
  - Total: 6,684
  - Density: 89.67/km^{2} (232.2/sq mi)
- Postal codes: 9980-9982, 9988
- NIS code: 43014
- Area codes: 09
- Website: www.sint-laureins.be

Sint-Laureins (Dutch pronunciation: [sɪnt lʌuˈrɛins]; Dutch for Saint Lawrence) is a municipality located in the Flemish province of East Flanders, in Belgium. The municipality comprises the towns of Sint-Jan-in-Eremo, Sint-Laureins proper, Sint-Margriete, Waterland-Oudeman and Watervliet. In 2021, Sint-Laureins had a total population of 6,919. The total area is 74.50 km^{2}.

The Church of Our Lady in Watervliet, built in the 16th century, is called the 'Cathedral of the North'.

== Gallery ==
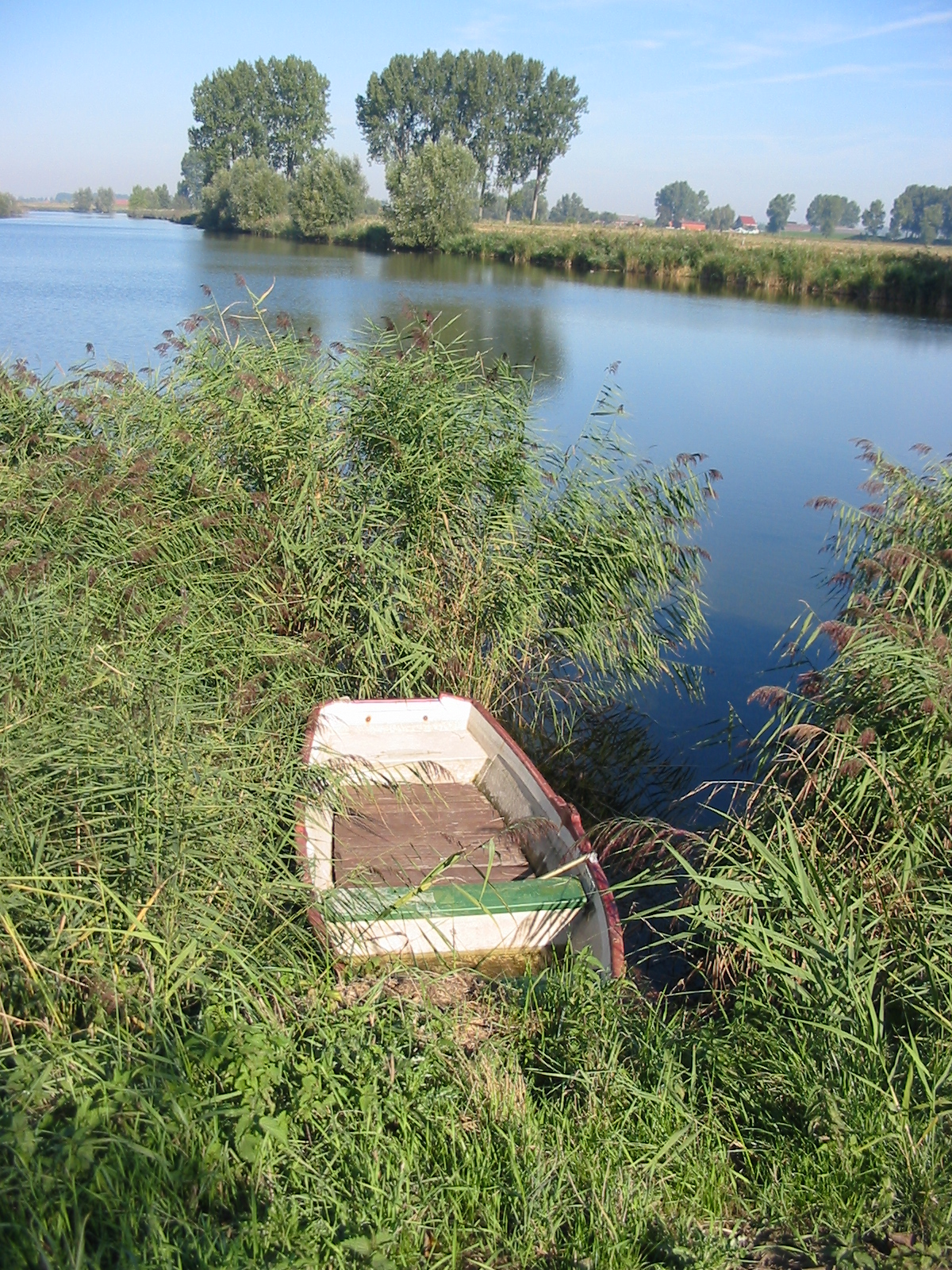
The Boerekreek is one of several lakes in Sint-Laureins

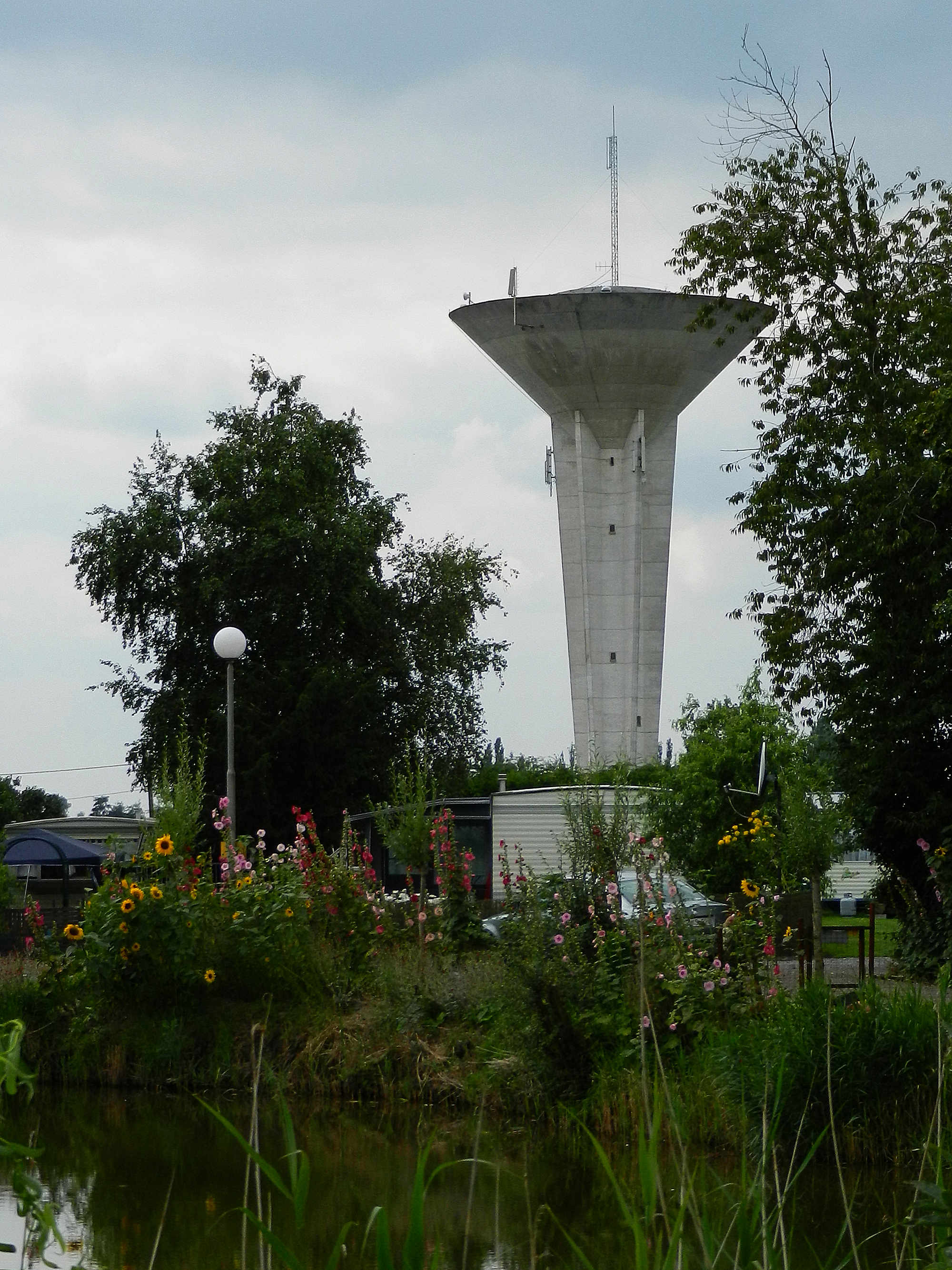
Water tower in Sint-Jan-in-Eremo

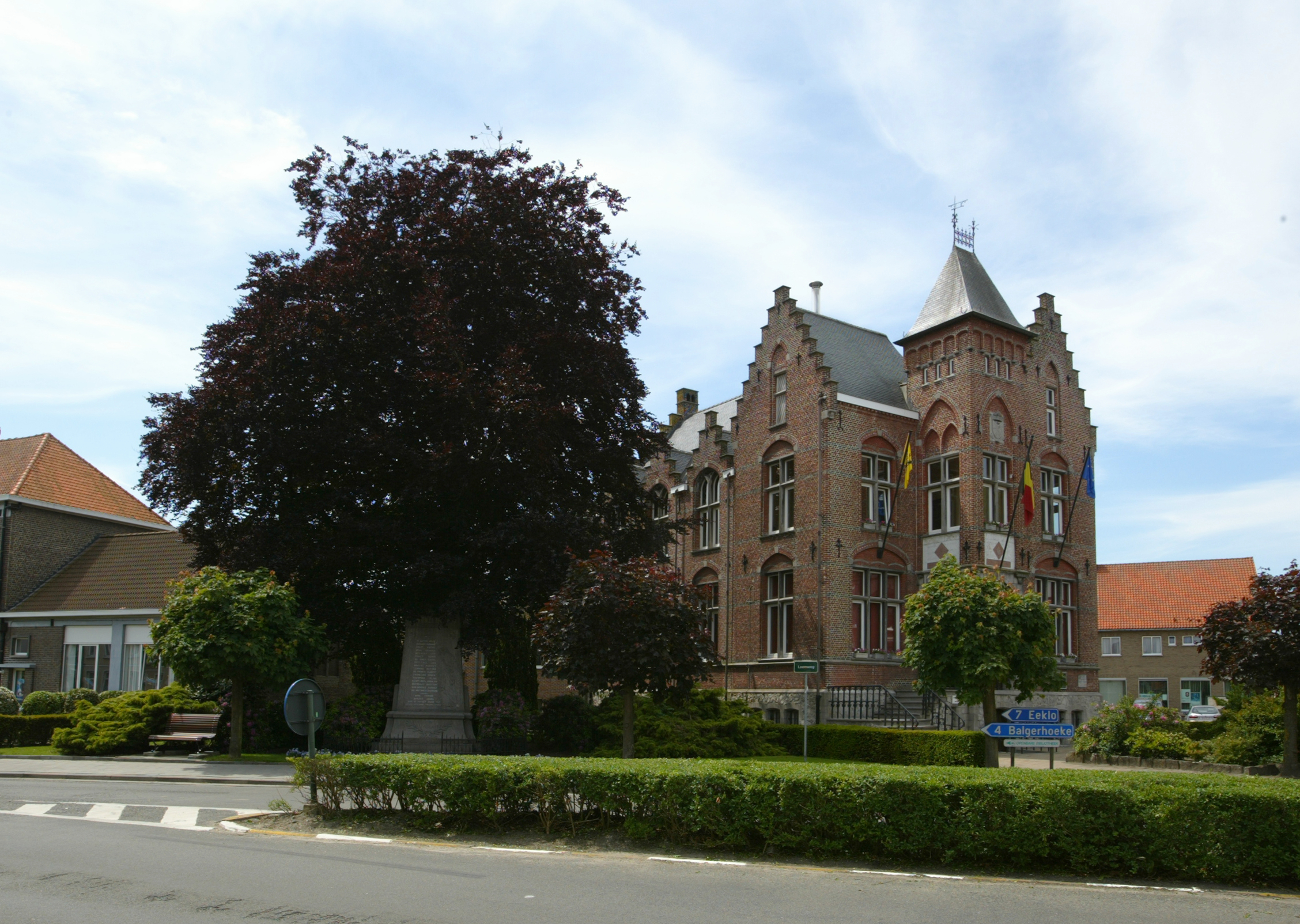
Town hall and freedom tree

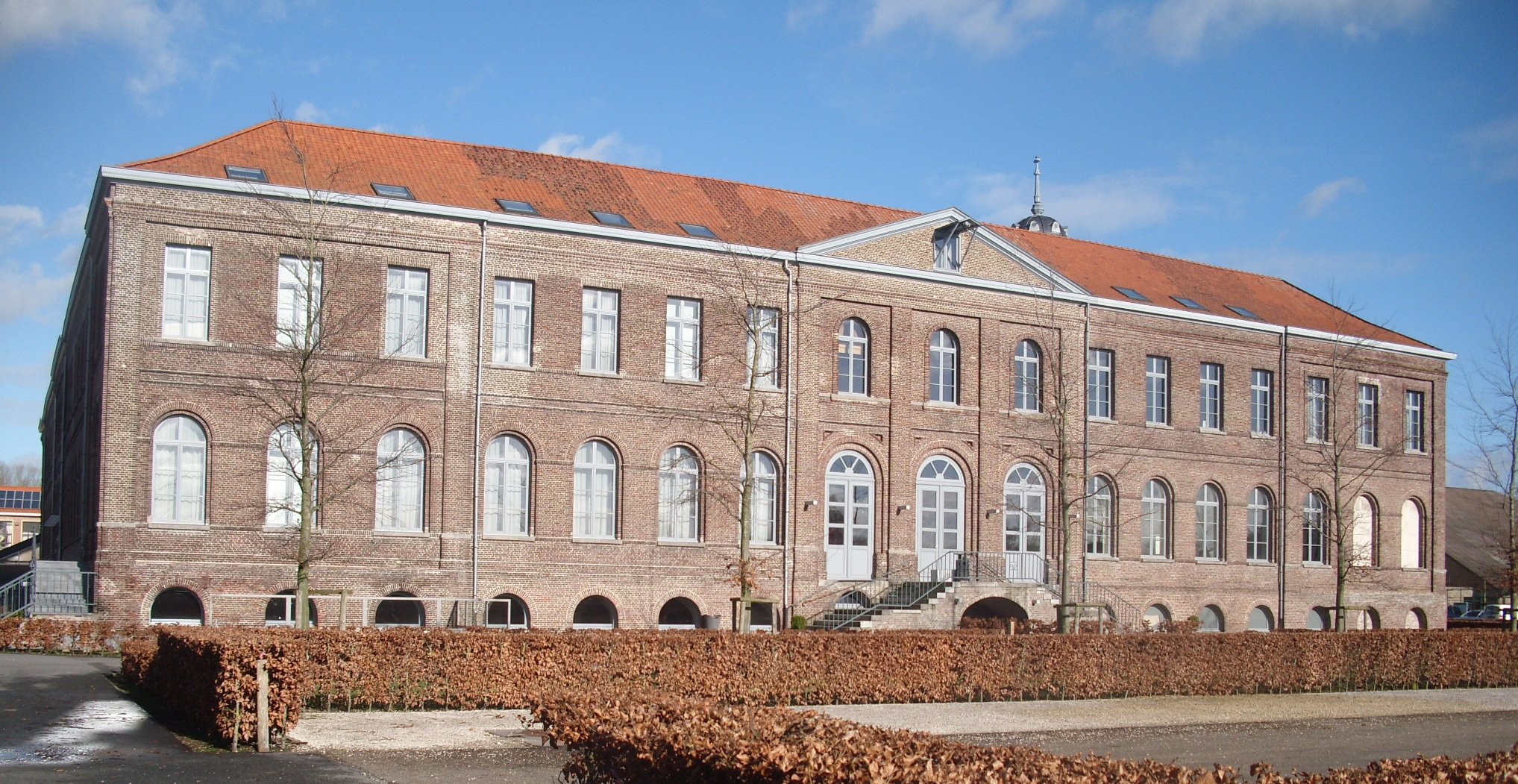
Godshuis. Currently a hotel/restaurant
