= Hieronymus Lauweryn van Watervliet =

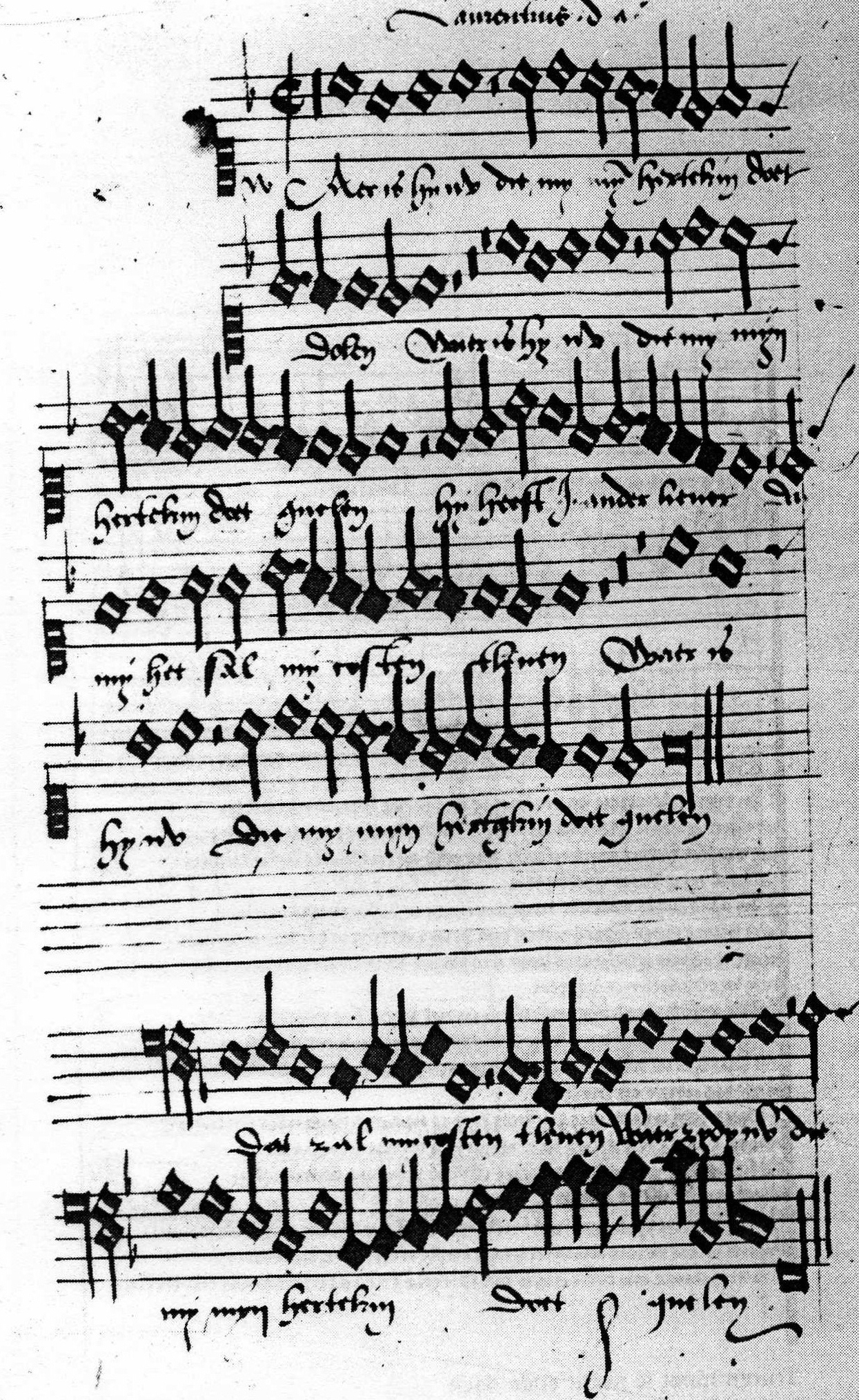
A song from his chansonnier, 1506–7

Count Hieronymus Lauweryn van Watervliet, or Jerome Laurinus of Watervliet, (c. 1450 – 1 June 1509) was a courtier at the court of Philip the Handsome, (Lord of the Netherlands and Duke of Burgundy then briefly King of Castile) to whom Lauweryn was treasurer. He was also a courtier at the courts of Maximilian I, Holy Roman Emperor, and of Margaret of Austria.

== Biography ==
=== Early life ===
Hieronymus Lauweryn van Watervliet was born around 1450 in Bruges to Bavo Lauweryn and his mistress Barbara Roels. After Bavo became a widower and married Roels, Hieronymus Lauweryn was legitimized.

=== Career ===
He began his career in 1477 as a clerk to the general receiver of Flanders, just like his father. In 1486 he became castellany receiver of Bruges, and this position almost cost him his life when he was arrested two years later by the rebellious people of Bruges.

In 1499 he became treasurer-general of the domains and finances, reaching the highest peak of the financial bureaucracy, and in 1503, he was knighted by Philip IV of France.

Lauweryn was also councilor and steward of Maximilian of Austria and governor of the children of Philip IV (including Emperor Charles V).

==== Investments into Flemish land reclamation ====
As an investor, he focused on land reclamation in Flanders. Between 1497 and 1508 he founded the following polders:

- Saint Christopher Polder (1499)
- Jeronimuspolder (1501)
- Laurinpolder (1503)
- Sint-Annapolder (1505)
- Saint Barbara (1508)
- Philippine polder

=== Death ===
He withdrew from his career due to poor health in 1508 and he died on 1 July 1509 in The Hague, with his final testament dated to 21 July 1509.

== Chasonnier ==
He is primarily remembered for having commissioned a chansonnier, which is named after him, around 1505/6 in Bruges. His chansonnier contains works by Alexander Agricola, Loyset Compère, Jean Mouton and Josquin. The songs are composed in various languages, comprising 36 French, and 25 Dutch, 14 Latin and 2 Italian works. Finally there is one Latin-French double-texted motet-chanson.

An edition of the chansonnier, with an introduction by W. McMurtry, was published by Alamire Music Publishers in 1989, and a selection of songs, including all Dutch songs, of the chansonnier recorded on 2 CDs by the Egidius Kwartet in 2007.

== Issue ==
He married twice. His first wife, Jacoba Peyaert (d.1502), was the daughter of Matthijs Peyaert. With her he had six children, including Matthias. He remarried Maria Strabant and they had three children.

His son Matthias Lauweryn, or Matthias Laurinus (d.1540), the second lord of Watervliet, was well known to Erasmus. He was responsible for the construction of the Church of Our Lady's Ascension in Watervliet.
