= Watervliet, Belgium =

Watervliet
- Village
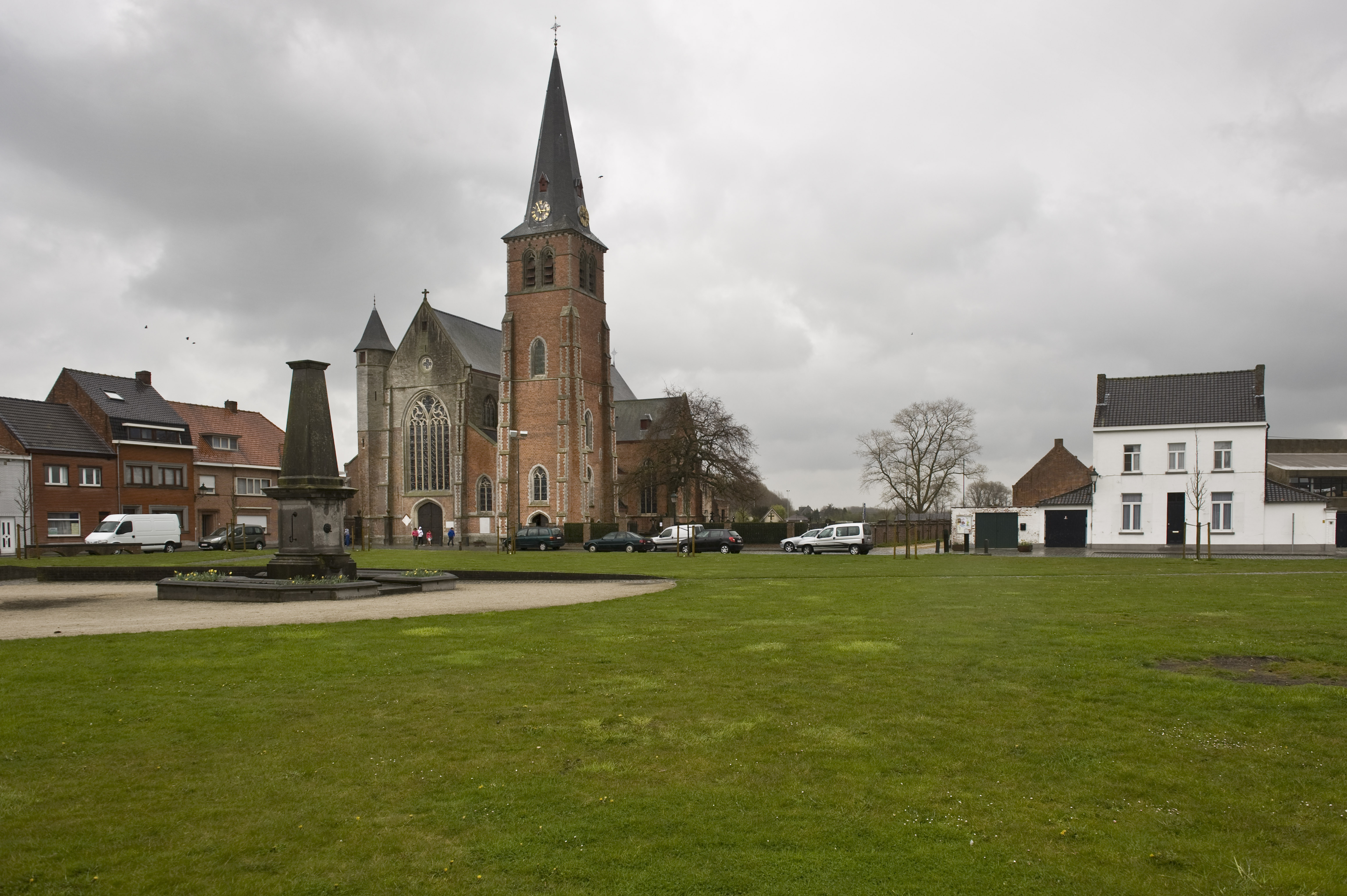
- The Our Lady-Church in Watervliet, built in the 16th century, is called the 'Cathedral of the North'

- Location in Belgium
- Coordinates: 51.27515°N 3.62543°E
- Country: Belgium
- Region: Flemish Region
- Province: East Flanders
- Municipality: Sint-Laureins

Area
  - Total: 21.09 km^{2} (8.14 sq mi)

Population (2021)
  - Total: 1,703
  - Density: 80.75/km^{2} (209.1/sq mi)
- Time zone: CET

Watervliet is a village in the Belgian province of East Flanders and suburb of the town of Sint-Laureins. Watervliet is part of the Meetjesland, and is adjacent to the Dutch border. It was a separate municipality until 1977.

== History ==
Watervliet started as a medieval village. In 1377, the village was lost in a flood. Around 1500, Hieronymus Lauweryn van Watervliet commissioned the poldering of the land, and rebuilt the village. Even though Lauweryn was of common origins, he was awarded lordship of Watervliet by Philip the Handsome in 1507.

In 1501, the Our Lady-Church was built, and was consecrated in 1503. Watervliet was planned to become a major harbour, hence the large size of the church. The church is commonly referred to as the "Cathedral of the North". In 1977, the municipality merged into Sint-Laureins.

== Gallery ==
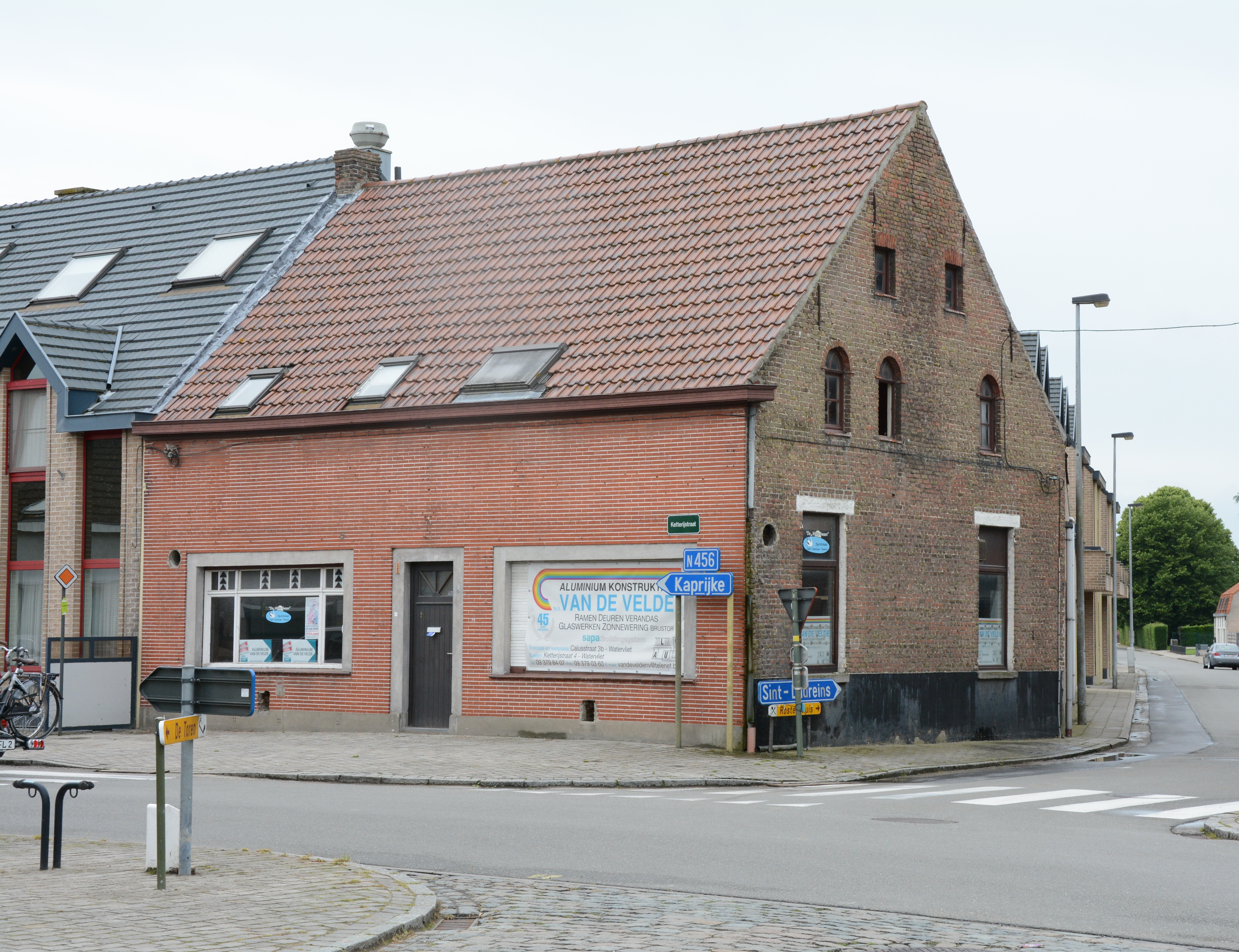
House in Watervliet

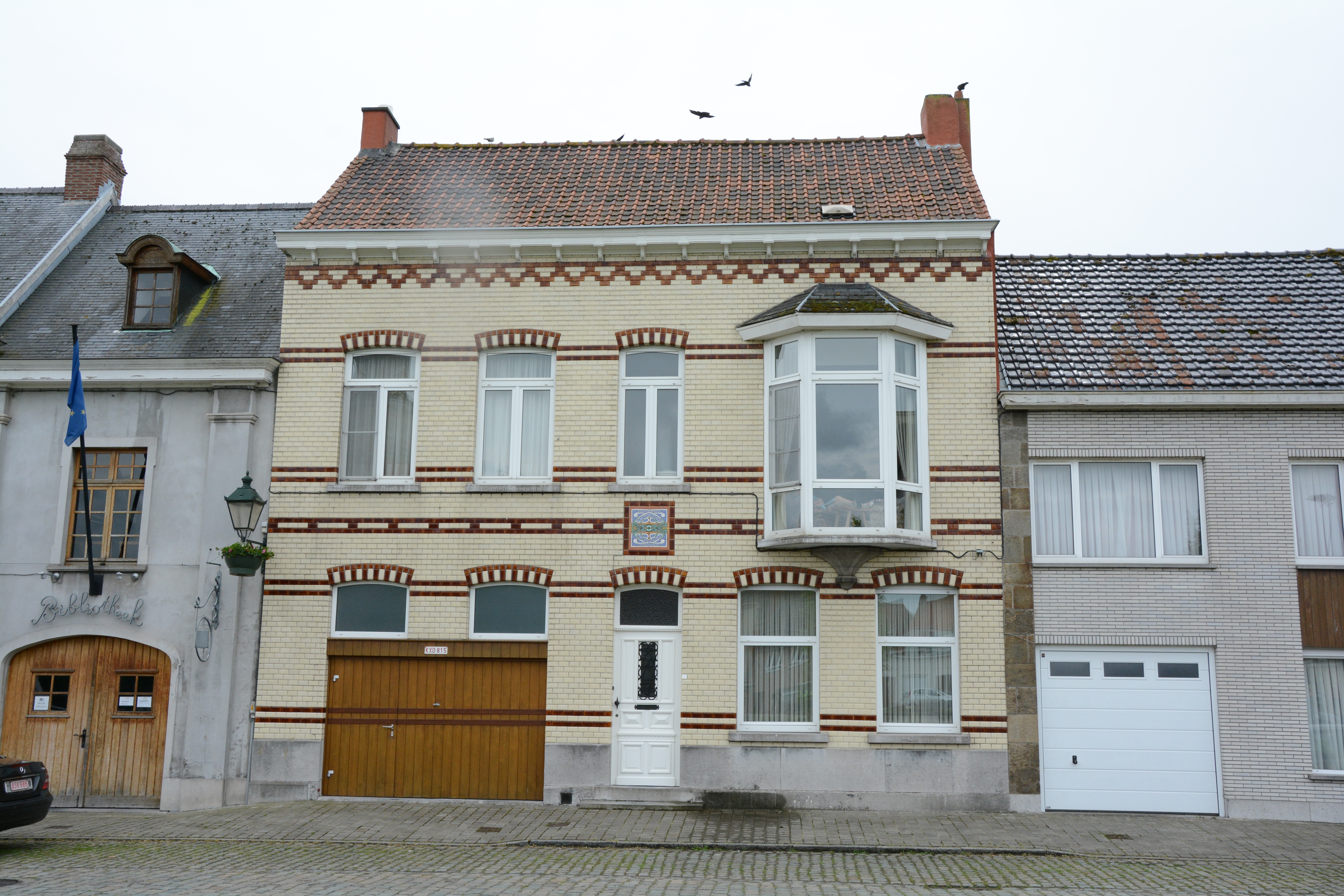
House in Watervliet

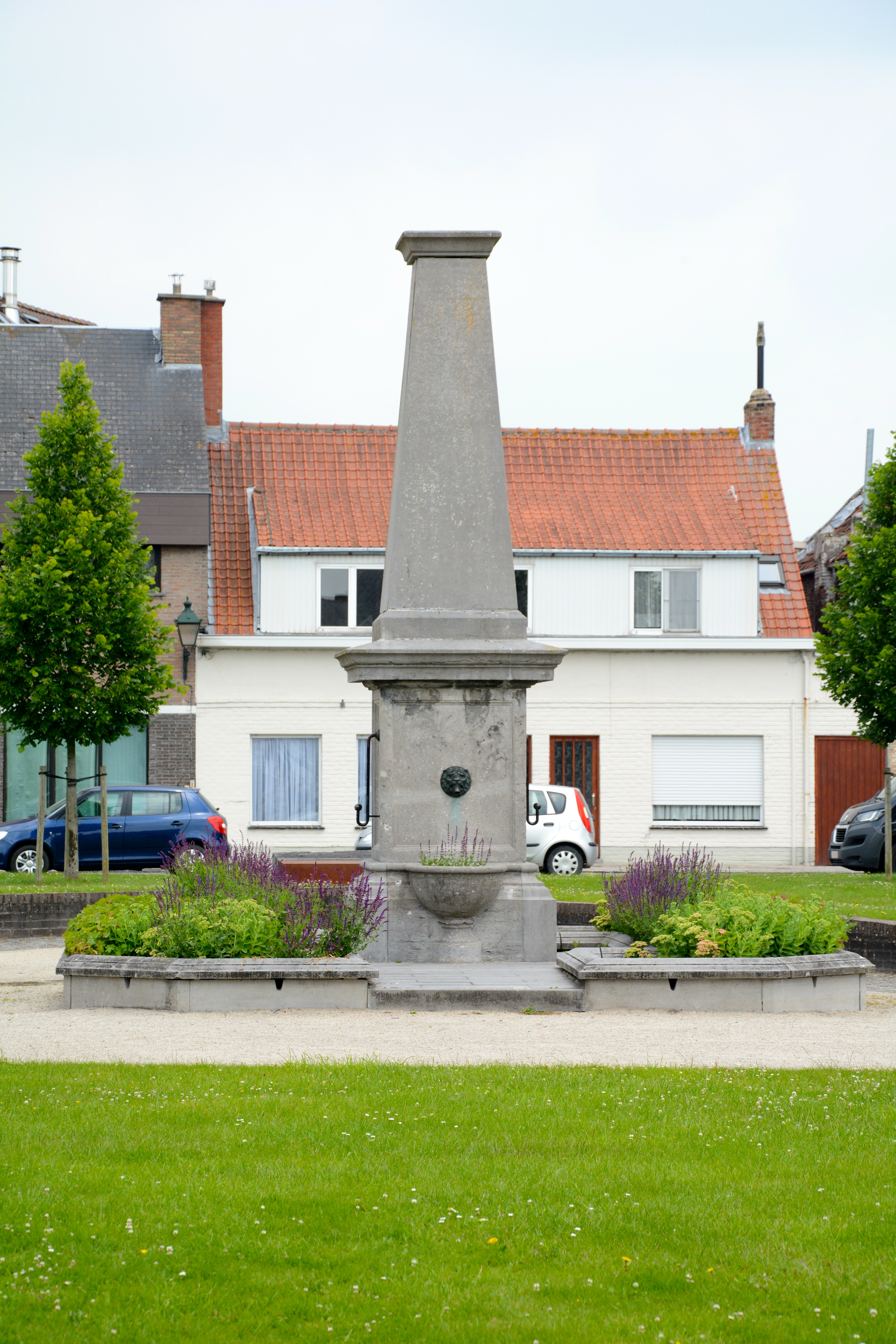
Village pump

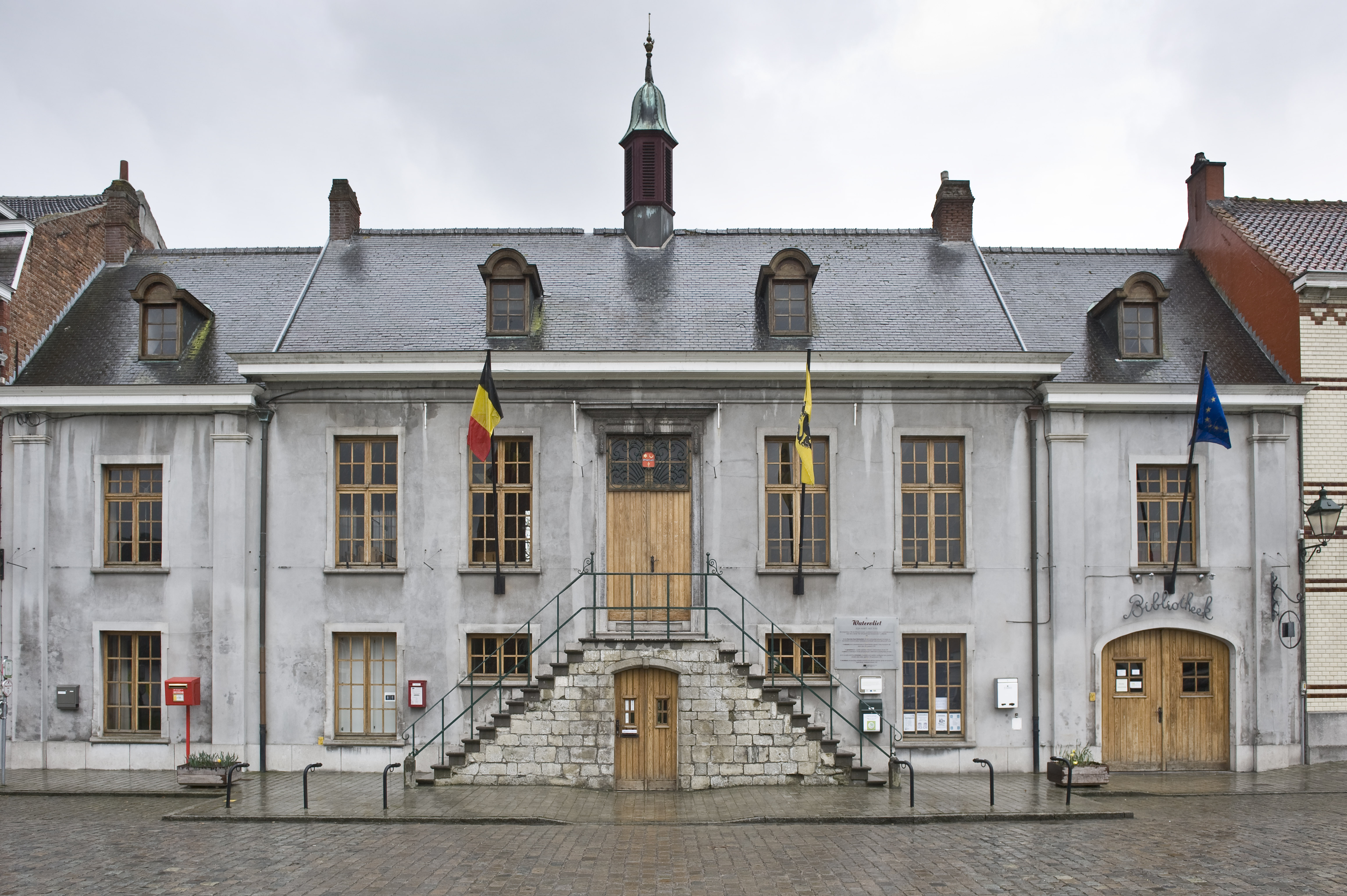
Former town hall
