= Noten =

Noten may refer to:

- Atenolol, a beta blocker medication
- Othene, a neighbourhood and former village in Terneuzen, Netherlands
