= Zaamslagveer =

- Hamlet
- Location in the province of Zeeland in the Netherlands Zaamslagveer (Netherlands)
- Coordinates: 51.3112°N 3.9433°E
- Country: Netherlands
- Province: Zeeland
- Municipality: Terneuzen
- Time zone: UTC+1 (CET)
  - Summer (DST): UTC+2 (CEST)
- Postal code: 4543
- Dialing code: 0115

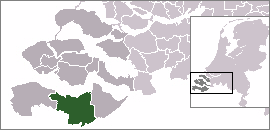
Location of Terneuzen

Zaamslagveer is a hamlet in the Dutch province of Zeeland. It is a part of the municipality of Terneuzen, and lies about 30 km southeast of Vlissingen.

Zaamslagveer is not a statistical entity, and the postal authorities have placed in under Zaamslag. Place name signs are present. 134 people lived in Zaamslagveer in 1840. There are currently about 50 homes there.
