= Otheense Kreek =

Creek system in Terneuzen, Netherlands

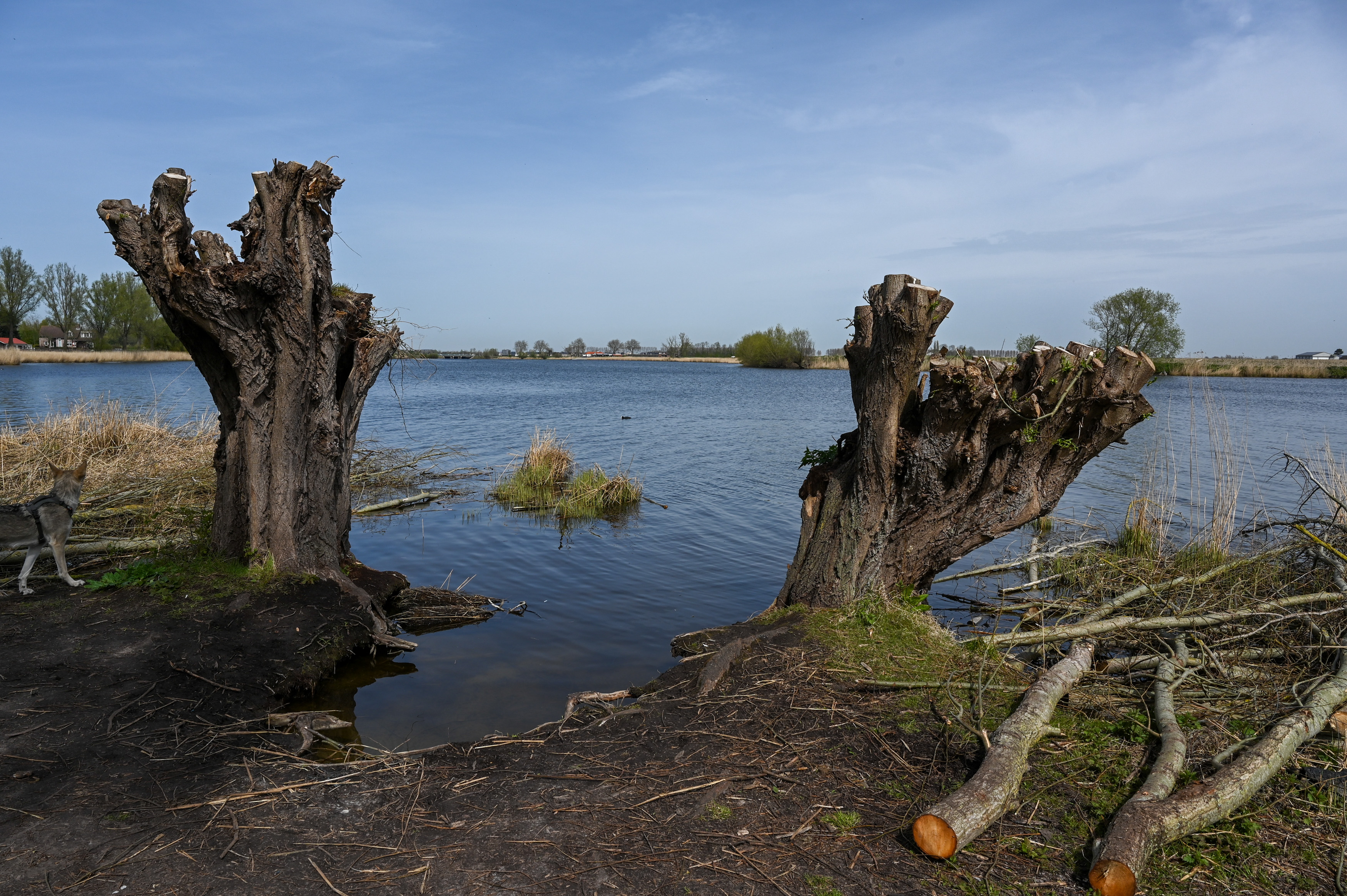
- Otheense Kreek at the Eiland van Meyer nature reserve
- Interactive map of Otheense Kreek
- Location: Terneuzen, Zeeland
- Coordinates: 51°19′9″N 3°51′40″E
- Type: Creek system
- Primary outflows: Western Scheldt

Otheense Kreek is a creek system in the Zeelandic Flanders region of the Netherlands. A southern and an eastern branch start in Axel and Zaamslag, respectively, and the mouth of the system is in the Western Scheldt estuary.

The system resulted from intentional military inundation in 1584 during the Eighty Years' War by breaching the levee at Othene. Sea water subsequently reached Spui, and a tidal creek developed. Othene was moved after it found itself at the bottom of the channel that still forms the Otheense Kreek. 13.5 km^{2} (5.2 sq mi) of the system was reclaimed in 1650, creating the Zaamslagpolder, while the remainder of Otheense Kreek was damned.

The water is used for recreational purposes. However, it is not a designated bathing water, and water quality is therefore not monitored for that purpose. Otheense Kreek has an average chloride level of 2,400 mg/l (0.0014 oz/cu in) in the summer, and it experiences yearly blue-green algae blooms and regular fish mortality.
