= Petrus Wesseling =

German philologist and jurist

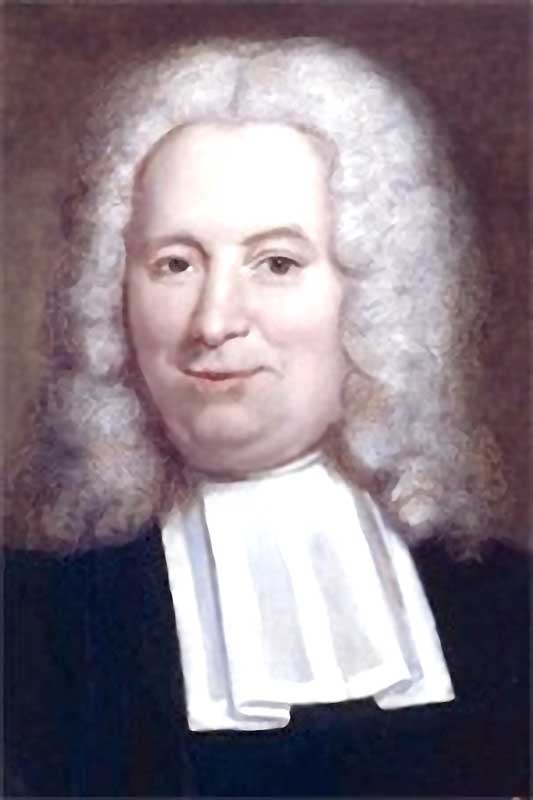
- Petrus Wesseling
- Born: 7 January 1692, Burgsteinfurt, County of Steinfurt
- Died: 9 November 1764, Utrecht
- Occupations: Philologist; Theologist; Jurist; Historian
- Writing career
- Genres: philology theology history

Petrus Wesseling (7 January 1692 – 9 November 1764) was a German philologist and jurist working in the Dutch Republic. He became famous as a philologist.

== Early life ==
Petrus Wesseling was born to Gerardus Wesseling and Anna Reiners or Creter on 7 January 1692 Old Style. When he was 10 he lost his father. He then went to his uncle Wessel Reiners, a merchant in Emden. Here Wesseling visited the Latin school. Later he went to the Gymnasium Arnoldinum in Steinfurt, where he was educated in classical languages and theology. His main teachers were August Houck (1677/79–1716), Werner Justin Pagenstecher (1671–1742) and Arnold Visch (? –1717). In 1712 Wesseling ended his studies in Steinfurt with the disputation theologica de petra in Matthaei evang. XVI:18

In October 1712 Wesseling registered at Leiden University. Here he listened to Jakob Gronovius, Jacobus Perizonius, Johannes a Marck (1656–1731), Salomon van Til (1643–1713), Franciscus Fabricius (1663–1738), and Johannes Wesselius.

In 1714 Wesseling went to the University of Franeker. As a theology student he visited the lessons of Campegius Vitringa, Ruard Andala (1665–1727) and Albert Schultens (1686–1750). In 1715 he again finished with a disputation. It was presided by Schultens and entitled de Originibus linguae Hebraei.

== Career ==
Wesseling next became a hofmeester (steward) to the Young M. Coehoorn van Scheltinga son of Curator Mart. van Scheltinga for a year. He then completed the training to qualify as a minister in the Dutch Reformed Church, which was also dominant in Emden. In 1718 he became a deputy rector at the Middelburg Grammar School. In 1720 a praelector for history and rhetoric. In 1721 he could become rector in Deventer, but the Zeeland authorities convinced him to stay by making him lecturer in Greek and history.

In 1724 he took up office as professor of history at the University of Franeker for 1,000 guilders a year. He started with the oratio de origine pontoficiae dominationis. In Franeker he taught: William IV, Prince of Orange, the Scheltinga's, Willem van Haren and Onno Zwier van Haren, J. Stinstra, Petrus Fontein, Petrus Conradi, and Saco Harmen van Idsinga. In 1733–1734 Wesseling was rector of the university. He ended his rectorate with the oratio de vitiis et defectibus historiae ecclesiasticae. In 1734 he was asked to become professor of history, Greek and oratory in Utrecht, but he declined. Utrecht had offered 1,200 guilders, but shortly before Franeker had given him an unrequested pay rise of 250 guilders.

Utrecht University again asked Wesseling to become professor of history, Greek and oratory on 7 March 1735. The salary was 1,600 guilders, and this time he agreed. On 13 June 1735 he started with his oratio pro historiis. In 1741 he declined an offer from Leiden.

On 27 June 1746 Wesseling was appointed as professor in Roman and Natural Law with a pay rise of 500 guilders. In order to teach this, he was promoted to doctor in law by Jacobus Voorda on 13 September 1746. On 26 September 1746 he started this professorate with the oratio De vera civitas. After the death of Arnold Drakenborch Wesseling also became responsible for the university library in 1749. Wesseling was rector in Utrecht in 1736–1737 and 1749–1750.

Wesseling was an Orangist. At least, this is indicated by him publishing a festive oratio about the 8 March 1748 birth of the future stadtholder William V, a work that was translated into Dutch.

== Private life ==
Wesseling was married to Anna van Groenewal (d. 1757). They had a son Johannes (d. 1750), and two daughters, Cornelia Elizabeth (d. 1792) and Anna Apollonia, who married minister Gijsbert Bonnet in 1754.

== Wesseling's work ==
=== As a philologist ===
Wesseling is considered to have been one of the major philologists of his time. He published many important works, and participated in many scientific societies.

An example of his work is his commented version of the Chronicon historiam catholicam. This was a work from Classical antiquity, and had been published for the first time in Oxford by Edward Simson in 1652. Wesseling made a new version with comments that explained the work. These could be from discoveries that had been made by himself and other scientists, or from closer investigation of the references given by Simson. Where necessary, Wesseling would confirm, improve or reject Simson's judgment, or give his own ideas. E.g. Simson and Jac. Cappellus thought that in the Book of Judges the 80 years of peace after Ehud killed Eglon, had to be read as only 8, but Wesseling rejected this in a note on page 218.

=== As a jurist ===
Wesseling's professorate in Roman and Natural Law was not a sinecure to keep him in Utrecht. This is evident from the positive review of his public law class by David Dalrymple, Lord Hailes, who was probably influenced by Wesseling's philological work. Dalrymple also recommended Wesseling's law class to James Boswell.

=== Visit by Bengt Ferner ===
In 1759 the astronomer and mathematician Bengt Ferner visited the Netherlands, and also Utrecht. In the University library he found only the students Swaving and Jona Willem te Water. When he asked them about the university, they said that Wesseling was its most famous and most learned professor. Bengt then visited Wesseling, and spoke with him in Latin because Wesseling did not speak French. They discussed scientific subjects and scientists including Olof Celsius and Johan Ihre.

== Selected works ==
- Oratio habita a.d. IV Non. Mai 1726 ad seren. principem Wilhelmum Carolum, Henricum Frisonem cum studiorum causa Leovardia Franequeram migrasset. Franeker 1726
- Observationum variarum libri duo. Amsterdam 1727
- Ed. Simsonii chronicon historiam catholicam complectens ex recensione et cum animado. P.W. Leiden 1729. Amsterdam 1752
- Probabilium liber singularis, in quo praeter alia, insunt vindiciae verborum Johannis, et Deus erat verbum. Franeker 1731
- Oratio funebris in memoriam Sicconis a Goslinga Kal. Nov. a 1751 dicta. Franeker 1732
- Wilhelmus Car. Henr. Friso Sponsus. Carmen recitatum et editum. Franeker 1734
- Diatribe de Judaeorum archontibus ad inscriptionem Berenicensem et dissertatio de evangeliis iussu Imp. Anastasii non emendatis in Victorem Tunnunensem. Utrecht 1758
- Sam. Petiti leges Atticae cum animadvers. et praefat. P. Wesselingii in Jurisprudentiae Rom. et Att. Tomo III. Leiden 1741
- Diodori Siculi Bibliotheca historica. Amsterdam 1745
- Oratio in natalem Wilhelmi comitis Burani. Utrecht 1748
- Episiola ad v. cl. Venemam de Aquilae in scriptis Philonis Judaei fragmentis et Platonis epistola. XIII cet. Utrecht 1748
- Oratio in obitum seren. principis Wilhelmi C.H. Frisonis. Utrecht 1752
- Dissertatio Herodotea ad Tib. Hemsterhusium. Utrecht 1758
- Oratio in obitum celsiss. principis Annae, faeder. Belg. gubernatricis. Utrecht 1759
- Herodoti Histor. libri IX. Editionem curavit et suas itemque L.C. Valckenaerii notas adi. P.W. Amsterdam 1763
