= Jona Willem te Water =

Dutch church historian and theologian

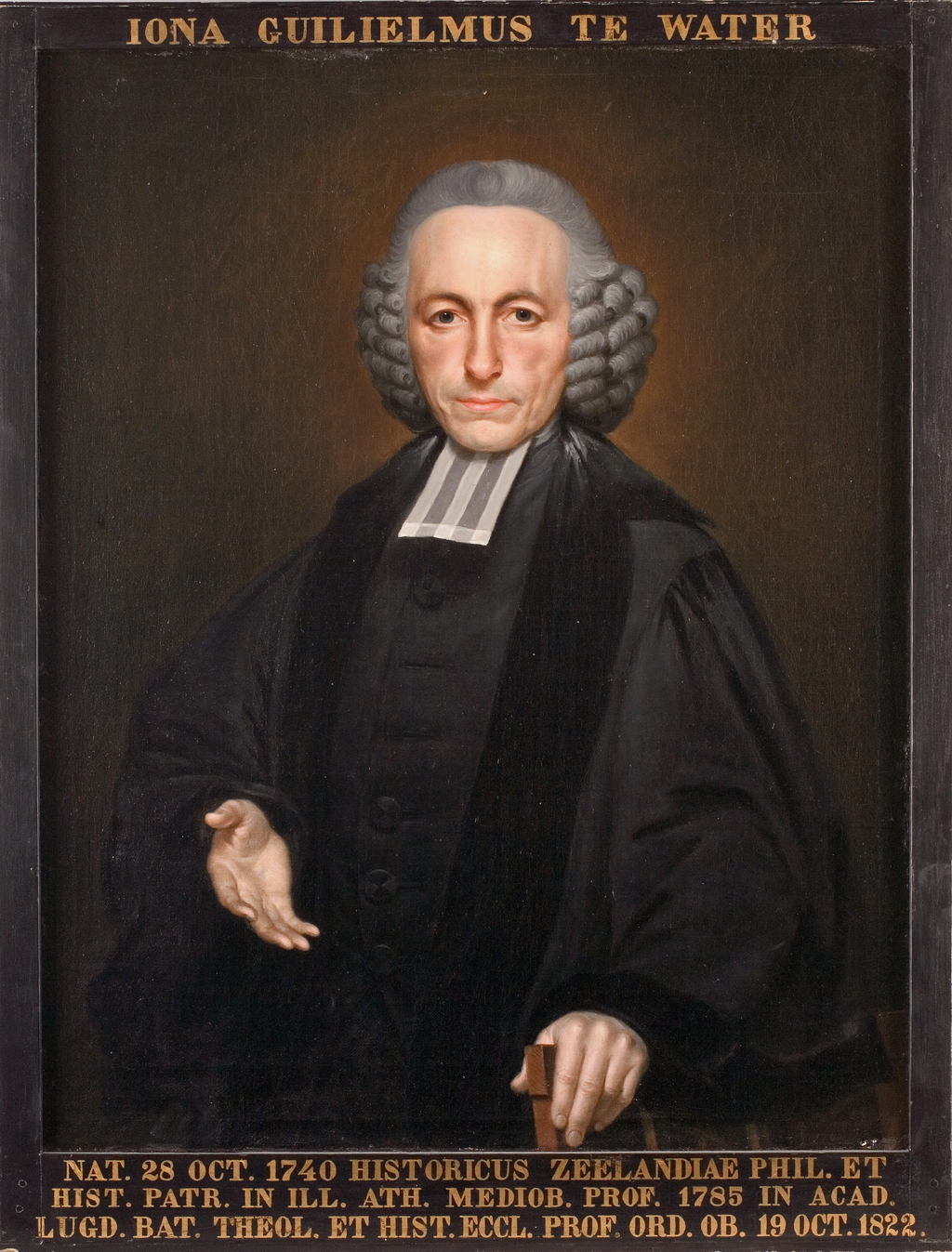
- Jona Willem te Water by Nicolas Joseph Delin (1741-1803)
- Born: 28 October 1740, Zaamslag
- Died: 19 October 1822, Leiden
- Occupations: Theologist; Minister; Historian
- Writing career
- Genres: history theology
- Notable work: Historie van het verbond en de smeekschriften der Nederlandsche edelen

Jona Willem te Water (1740–1822) was a professor at Leiden University. He was a man of influence in the Dutch Reformed Church, in many learned societies, in academic theology, and in Dutch historiography.

== Early life ==
=== Family ===
Jona Willem te Water was born to Willem te Water and his wife Sara van Middelhoven, daughter of Jona van Middelhoven (1685–1770). They lived in Zaamslag, Zeelandic Flanders, which was and still is a rather isolated place in the Netherlands. Of the couple's many children five sons and a daughter reached maturity.

Jona Willem's father Willem (1698–1764) had studied theology. In 1725 he became minister in Zaamslag. In 1742 he became minister in Axel. This was not a good career. It might have been caused by lack of the required oratory skills.

In his free time Willem wrote historical studies. He wrote some works about church history, like his De Historie der hervormde kerk te Gent. In more theological works, he displayed his orthodox views.

In 1761 Willem te Water published Het hoog adelyk, en adelryk Zeelant. This work about the history of the Zeeland nobility had to do with Willem's connections to Jan van Borssele van der Hooge (1707–1764). The Van der Hooghe family had become very successful, and wanted to claim nobility. Jan was probably the most powerful man in Zeeland. He called on Willem te Water for help. In return he got appointments for two of his sons. Jan was the main sponsor of Jona's theology study and probably also that of the other two sons.

=== Childhood ===
During the War of the Austrian Succession, Zeelandic Flanders was invaded by the French in April 1747. The Te Waters fled to Goes and then Middelburg, but father Willem stayed behind. The French left in January 1749. In 1750 Jona went to the Grammar School of Vlissingen, on the other side of the Western Scheldt. In September 1755 he finished, and held a speech about the noble family Van Borselen.

=== Study in Utrecht ===
In September 1755 Jona Willem went to Utrecht to study Theology. The faculty of theology inclined to Orthodoxy. However, the strongest influence on Jona were the philologist Petrus Wesseling (1692–1764), and Sebald Rau (1724–1818), who taught Oriental studies. Jona was taught directly by Wesseling, as were Adriaan Kluit (1735–1807), Meinard Tydeman (1741–1825), and Rijklof Michaël van Goens (1748–1810). Wesseling was orthodox, but allowed some textual criticism of the bible. In politics Wesseling was a staunch Orangist.

Te Water finished his studies with a disputatio about the funeral and grave of Jesus. The main part consisted of philological comments on 35 words or word groups in parts of the bible that treated this subject. In these comments Te Water included classical authors as well as sources in Syriac and Arabic. Of course the work was dedicated to his benefactor Jan van Borssele van der Hooghe.

== Career ==
=== First offices as Minister ===
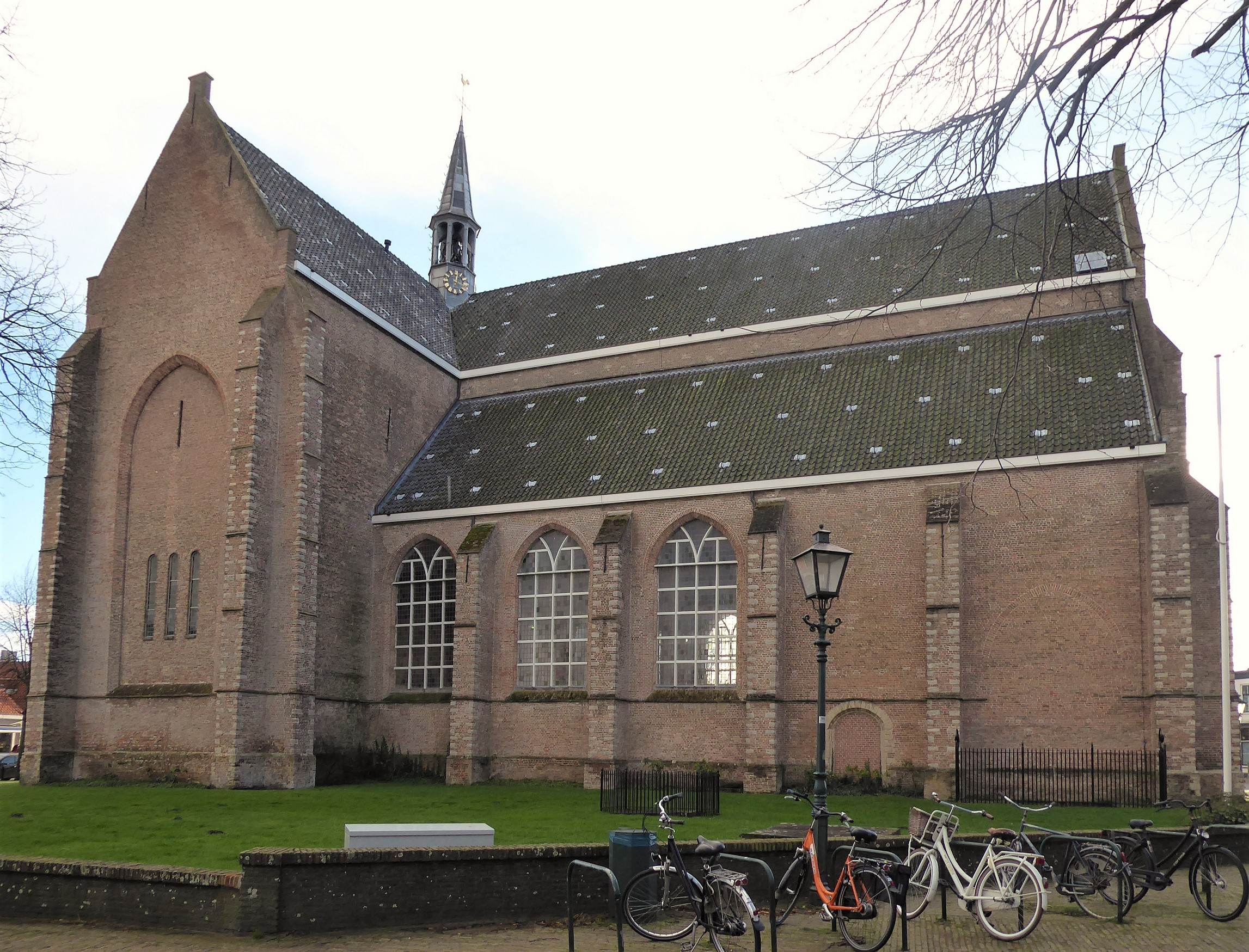
The church of Haamstede

In March 1761 Jona qualified as a minister for the Dutch Reformed Church. While others sometimes had to wait for years before they got their first parish, Jona got a chance to prove himself in Haamstede, and was confirmed there in October 1761. Haamstede was a parish with about 206 members in 1765.

Jona's benefactor Van Borssele was again decisive for the appointment. While at Haamstede, Jona continued his studies, and befriended the inhabitants of Haamstede Castle. These had some authority over the local church, especially with regard to appointing the minister.

Already in August 1763, Jona started a new office in Veere, where he had three colleagues. It meant that in about two years, Jona had grown from village minister to minister in a town. This was again thanks to Van Borssele.

=== Minister in Vlissingen ===
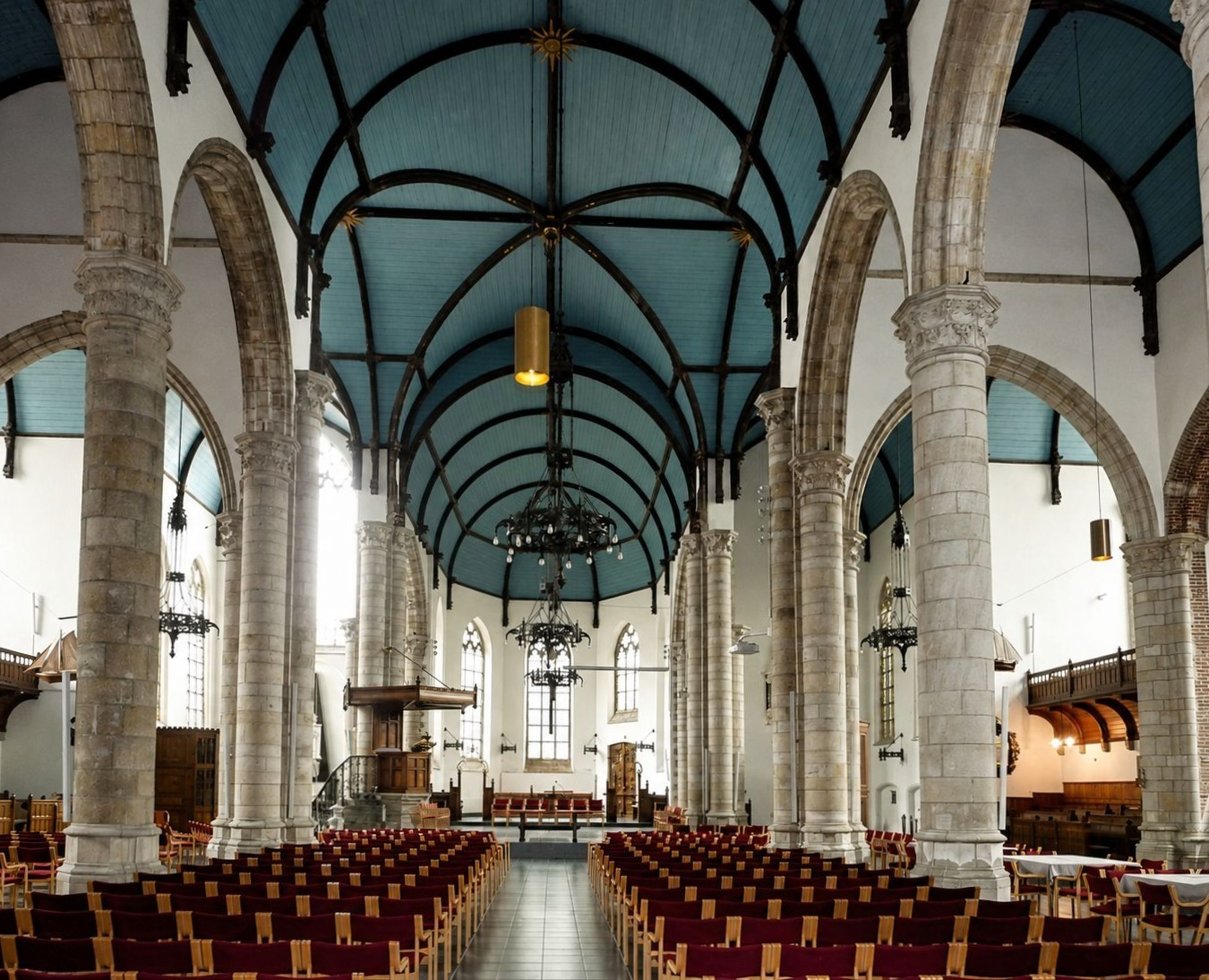
Great Church of Vlissingen

In October 1765, Jona became a minister in Vlissingen. Here Jona married Paulina Cornelia Mounier (1738–1814) in 1766. She was well off financially, but had problems hearing. In 1768 the couple bought a house on Korte Vlamingstraat in Vlissingen.

In Vlissingen Jona discovered the poetry talent of Jacobus Bellamy (1757–1786). He taught him linguistics and borrowed materials to him. Later, Jona organized funding, so that Bellamy could go to the Grammar School and theological faculty of Utrecht. Bellamy would die there as a student in 1786.

In Vlissingen Jona started to publish works about the history of Zeeland. He finished his father's work about the Reformation in Zeeland, and got it published in 1766. In 1767 Jona published a work about the entry of Stadtholder William V as Marquess of Vlissingen, accompanied by a history of the city. In 1772 he published a sermon delivered on account of the liberation of Vlissingen in 1572.

In 1769 the Royal Zeeland Scientific Society was founded in Vlissingen. This was a very prestigious affair, with the directors coming from the local regents, and membership being restricted. As a member of the society Jona had contact with members who practiced history in their spare time. These were Josua van Iperen, Justus Tjeenk, Nicolaas Cornelis Lambrechtsen, Laurens Pieter van de Spiegel, Adrianus 's-Gravezande, and Jacobus Ermerins. These were all very much interested in the history Zeeland, and assisted each other with finding sources for their work.

Later in the 1770s Jona became known outside Zeeland. In 1771 he was listed as candidate for Dordrecht. In 1773 the psalms which had been to set to verse and tune by Pieter Datheen in 1566, were updated by a church commission appointed by the government. In 1774 Jona anonymously published a book that applauded the work of the commission.

Jona's Historie van het verbond en de smeekschriften der Nederlandsche edelen (history of the alliance and requests of the Dutch nobility) was his Magnum Opus. His father had already started research into the subject by 1757, and left a manuscript, yet it is undoubtedly Jona's work. It is very rich in detail and took great care about how sources were used. By 1918 it was still relevant.

In August 1776 Jona was offered a position as minister in Groningen. It was accompanied by the promise that he would be appointed as professor at the University of Groningen on the first vacancy. Zeeland succeeded in keeping him in Vlissingen by offering him a paid position as provincial historian. In 1776 Jona also became second secretary of the Royal Zeeland Scientific Society.

In October 1778 there was severe civil disobedience in Vlissingen, directed against the decision to allow the establishment of a Roman Catholic church in the city. The stadtholder suppressed it by sending part of the army and arresting the leaders of the rebellion. In this conflict Jona supported the government, with which he was so closely connected. Most of his parish then turned against him, leading to a long series of very quite services.

=== Professor in Middelburg ===
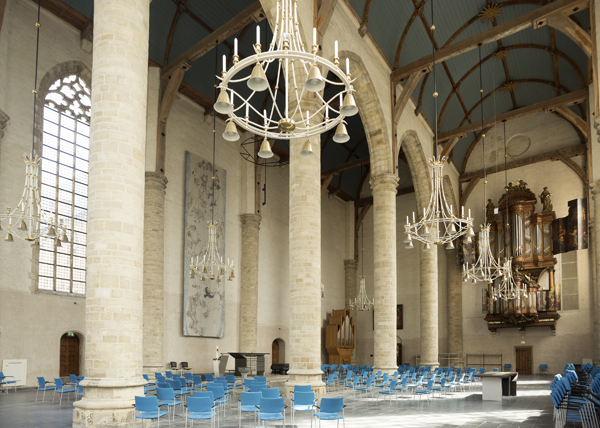
Nieuwe Kerk in Middelburg

In August 1779 Jona was appointed as professor of philosophy and national history at the Grammar School of Middelburg. On 15 March 1780 he accepted in the Nieuwe Kerk, with the Oratio de praestantia et dignitate historiae Batavae or excellence and dignity of the national history. Jona's salary was 600 guilders.

In summertime, Jona gave four lessons a week, more in winter. Now and then he still preached in Middelburg or the surrounding villages, but he no longer had an office as minister. He did remain in office as actuaris perpetuus of the Classis Walcheren of the Reformed Church. All this left plenty of time for the Zeeland Society, and his historical pursuits.

=== Professor in Leiden ===
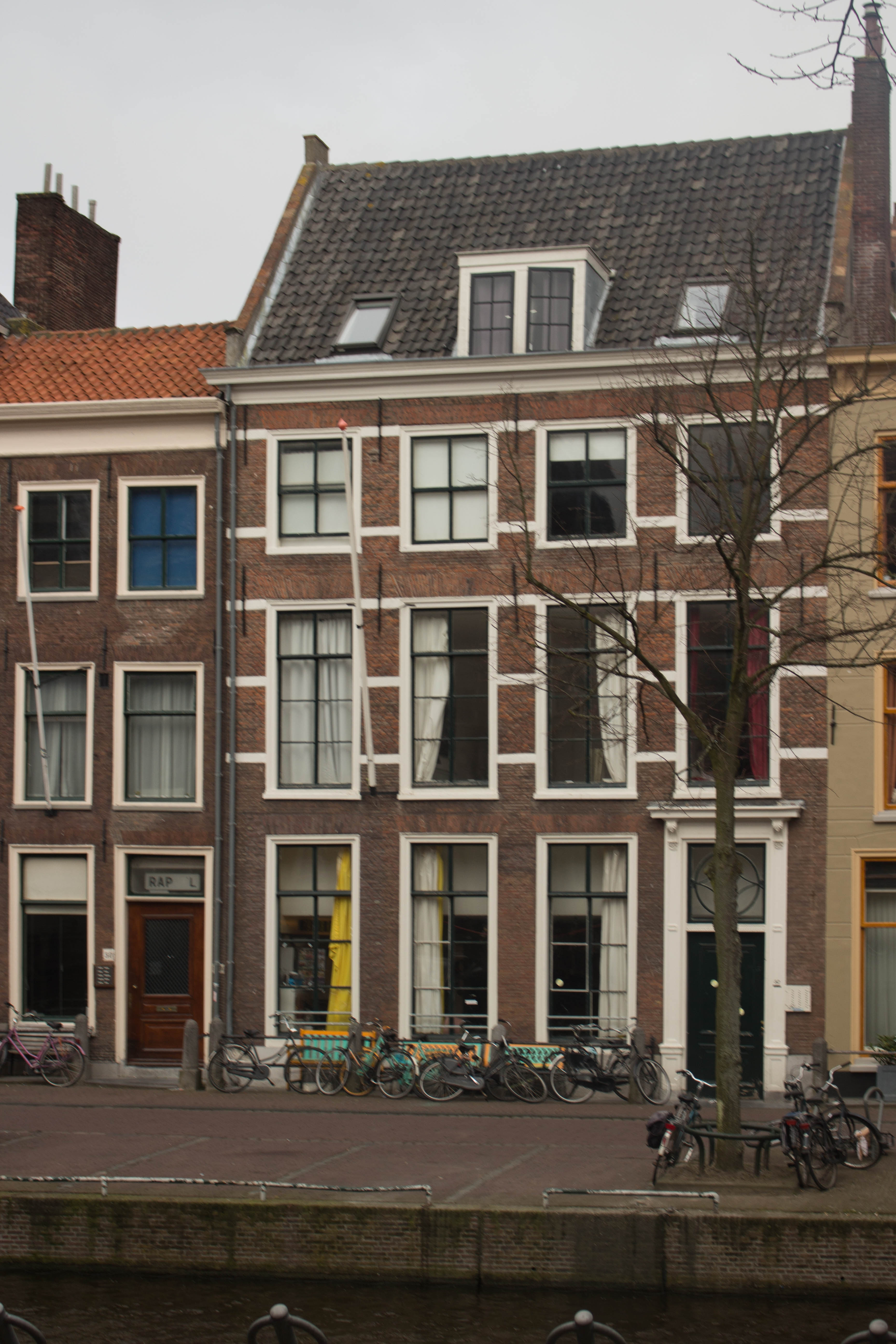
Jona's house in Leiden

In March 1785, Jona took up a new job as professor of Theology and Church History at Leiden University for 2,750 guilders a year. On account of this appointment Leiden University made his a doctor. For 5,000 guilders Jona bought the house known as Rapenburg 52. In 1793 his niece Paulina te Water (1770–1833) moved in to take care of Jona's wife, who was in bad health.

The theological faculty at Leiden already had four professors when Jona arrived: The conservative Aegidius Gillissen (1712–1800), Brouërius Broes (1757–1799) was the most liberal, and Carolus Boers (1746–1814) and Ewald Hollebeek (1719-1796) were in between. In 1784–1785 the revolutionary movement of the patriottentijd started to become violent, and in September 1785 the stadtholder left Holland.

An affair that could have turned ugly was that Johann Christoph Schwab (1743–1821) won a prize awarded by Leiden University. Schwab had sent in a philosophical writing that the theologists deemed to be Deist. The faculty reacted only by stating that it was not part of the body that awarded the prize. In the end it came to a vote in the senate which the theologians lost. In March 1787 Jona registered his objection that awarding the prize for Schwab's work was at odds with the conditions by which the testator had provided it, and that the work was harmful to Christianity.

In September 1787 the Prussian invasion of Holland restored stadtholder William V's authority in Holland province. In early 1788 Jona was then proposed to become Rector, which was a one-year office. He declined, because he thought himself to inexperienced, but in February 1789 Jona did accept. His year as rector was the highlight of Jona's career. On the last day, the stadtholder and his two sons dined at Jona's house at Rapenburg.

=== The French period ===
The French period led to the establishment of the Batavian Republic in January 1795. As an Orangist, Jona carefully stayed away from politics, and kept his office at the university. In 1796 he donated his portrait by Nicolas-Joseph Delin to the university. In 1800-1801 Jona became rector of the university for a second term.

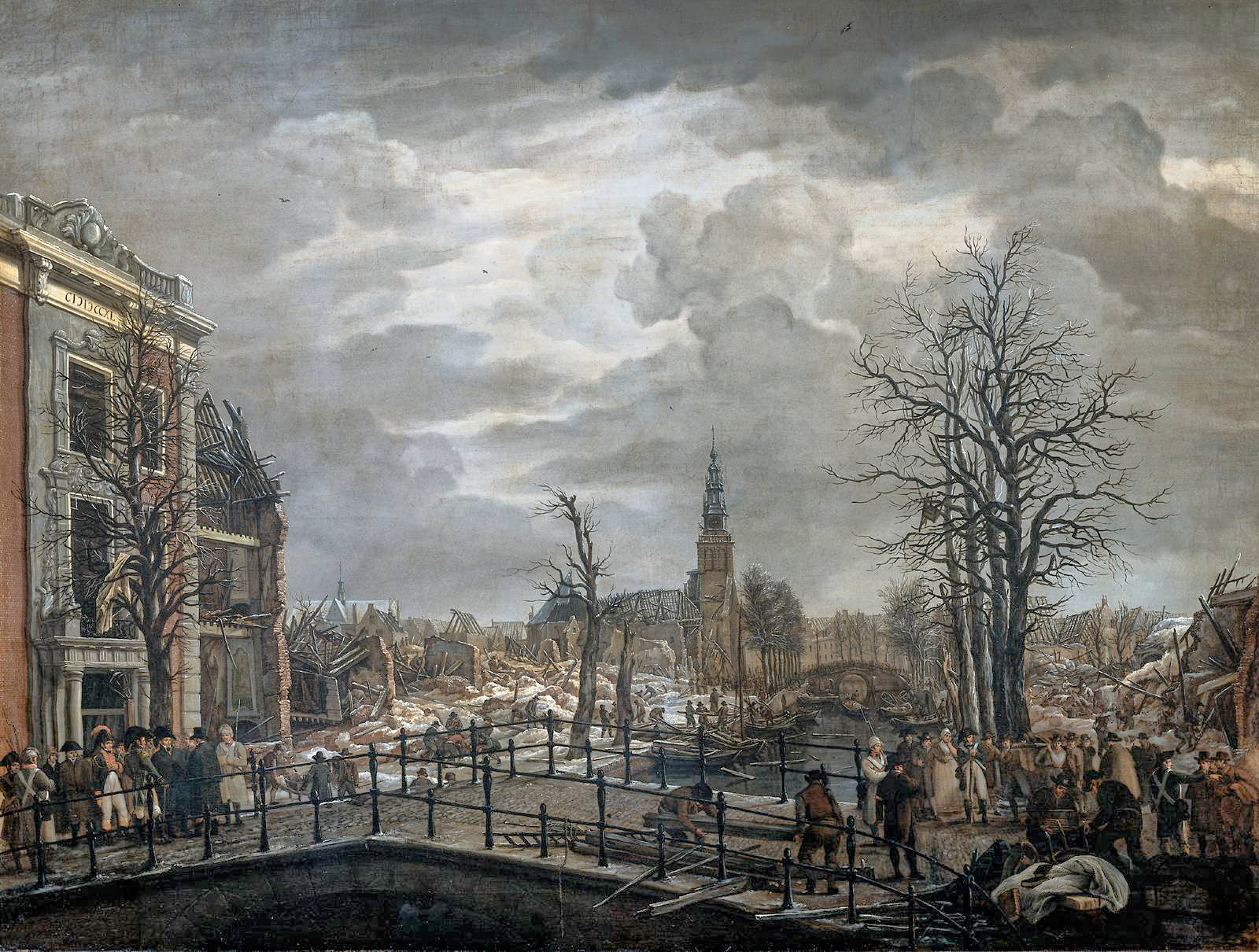
1807 gunpowder disaster

On 12 January 1807 the Leiden gunpowder disaster took place. A barge with 17,760 kg of gunpowder exploded in the center of Leiden. The Te Waters were unharmed, but their house suffered 1,199 guilders of damage. A famous (but unproven) anecdote is that Jona's almost completely deaf wife finally heard something, and said: 'Did you say something Te Water?'.

Jona participated in multiple government commissions that aimed to modernize the structure of the church, and to merge it with other Protestant churches. In these commissions he tried to preserve the doctrine of the Reformed Church and its basic organization.

In 1808 he was elected a member of the Royal Institute.

=== Retirement ===
In August 1815 a law came into effect that retired all professors on their 70th birthday, while keeping their salary. Jona was 75 at the time, and therefore the university declared in November 1815 that Jona had become an emeritus in 1810, and was not entitled to the 25% pay rise that the same law granted after 30 years of teaching. In 1816 Jona also retired as minister in Leiden.

Jona considered his forced retirement as a disgrace. Nevertheless, Jona continued to teach till he was 80. In 1821 he got a gratification of 700 guilders, i.e. 25% of his salary. In 1817 there was some consolation when Jan Hendrik van Kinsbergen ordered Charles Howard Hodges to paint the portraits of the four oldest members of the Royal Institute. The old Jona sat for the portrait, and this now hangs in the Trippenhuis in Amsterdam.

== Jona te Water as a historian ==
Dutch national history was Jona's passion, and in particular that of the early phases of the Eighty Years' War. Jona's works centered on three themes: freedom, Divine providence, and Calvinism.

Jona was mainly inspired by two historians. His university professor Petrus Wesseling (see above) was of a school called kritische polyhistorie. In religion and politics this school was rather conservative, but it did apply historical criticism. Jona's other inspiration was Jan Wagenaar (1709–1773). He propagated to write history in an empirical way, being impartial and secular. Wagenaar also used historical criticism, but in spite of his proposed impartiality, he always supported the point of view of the Dutch States Party. Both historians did not treat history as a normative science.

The traditional reformed school of historians used national history as a part of religion. Most of them were ministers. For them, the Dutch Republic was the new Israel. The stadtholders were the kings of the old testament, and the historians were like the prophets, who had to guide their people back to the right religious track. They would describe events by showing how god had aided and saved the Republic in the past. This school showed a tendency to become more critical on sources, while staunchly adhering to its view of the world. It always supported the Orangists.

The Enlightened school of history, gave center stage to mankind, and its ambitions and emotions. The enlightened historians wanted to reach a big audience and therefore wrote more readable books without annotations. They liked to draw conclusions from their narrative. In the Dutch Republic the Enlightened historians differed from their European counterparts by concentrating on the institutional history of states.

Jona's work shows where he stood. For Jona, the Eighty Years' War was about freedom, not about the reformation. Therefore, he advocated (political) liberty for Catholics to practice their religion. This set Jona apart from the traditional reformed school. He also did not write about the Netherlands as the new Israel. However, Jona stressed the role of divine providence by recognizing the hand of God in the many details that led to the unlikely success of the Dutch rebellion.

Jona used the idea of drawing lessons from history from the Enlightened school. He differed from Wagenaar by taking the side of William the Silent, and stressing the role of providence. He nevertheless considered Wagenaar to be the national historian.

By the end of his life, Jona himself noted that his fame as a historian was already diminishing. His work nevertheless continued to be relevant because of the solid research behind it.

== Selected works ==
- Oratio honori et meritis illustrimae gentis Borsaliae (1755)
- Redenvoering ter eere, en over de verdiensten des doorluchtigen geslachts van Borssele, uitgesprooken te Vlissingen. (1755)
- Kort verhaal der reformatie van Zeeland in de zestiende eeuwe (1766)
- Plechtige inhuldiging van ... Willem den Vyfden, Prins van Oranje en Nassau als Erfheer van Vlissingen (1766)
- Historie van het verbond en de smeekschriften der Nederlandsche edelen, ter verkrijginge van vrijheid in den godsdienst en burgerstaat, in de jaaren 1565-1567 (1776)
- Tweede eeuw-feest van de vryheid in den burgerstaat en godsdienst binnen de stad Vlissingen (1772)
- Aanspraak aan de Hervormde Kerk in Nederland bij gelegenheid der Invoeringe van de nieuwe Psalmberijminge (1774)
- Oratio de praestantia et dignitate historiae Batavae (1780)
- Levens-berigt van Jona Willem te Water overleden den 19 October 1822 (1823)
