= Othene =

Former village and neighbourhood of Terneuzen, Netherlands

- Neighbourhood
- The hamlet of Noten
- Interactive map of Othene
- Location within Zeeland
- Coordinates: 51°19′50″N 3°51′50″E
- Country: Netherlands
- Province: Zeeland
- Municipality: Terneuzen
- Locality: Terneuzen

Area
  - Total: 1.48 km^{2} (0.57 sq mi)
  - Water: 0.15 km^{2} (0.058 sq mi)
- Elevation: 2 m (6.6 ft)

Population (2026)
  - Total: 4,625
  - Density: 3,130/km^{2} (8,090/sq mi)
- Postal code: 4533

Othene is a neighbourhood of Terneuzen and a former village in the Dutch province of Zeeland. It is located in the eastern part of Terneuzen, across the Otheense Kreek, a channel, and it also borders the Western Scheldt estuary. As of 2026, Othene had a population of 4,625 and a surface area of 1.48 km^{2} (0.57 sq mi).

Originally a village, the first known mention of Othene is from 1160. It was lost to the sea in 1214, and it was subsequently rebuilt to the south. During the Eighty Years' War, it suffered heavy damage from attacks by German soldiers fighting for the Spanish, and Othene was lost to intentional military inundations in 1584 and 1586. The Otheense Kreek, on the bottom of which the village found itself, remained after new levees were erected. The village was moved once again to the north, and it became a hamlet that was part of Zaamslag. Othene later became part of Terneuzen, when the city expanded across the Otheense Kreek. The first three homes of the project that was intended to result in 2,700 homes were completed in October 1996. The northern part of the new neighbourhood was built first, followed by the south, together surrounding the former hamlet, referred to as Noten.
