= Zaamslag =

- Village
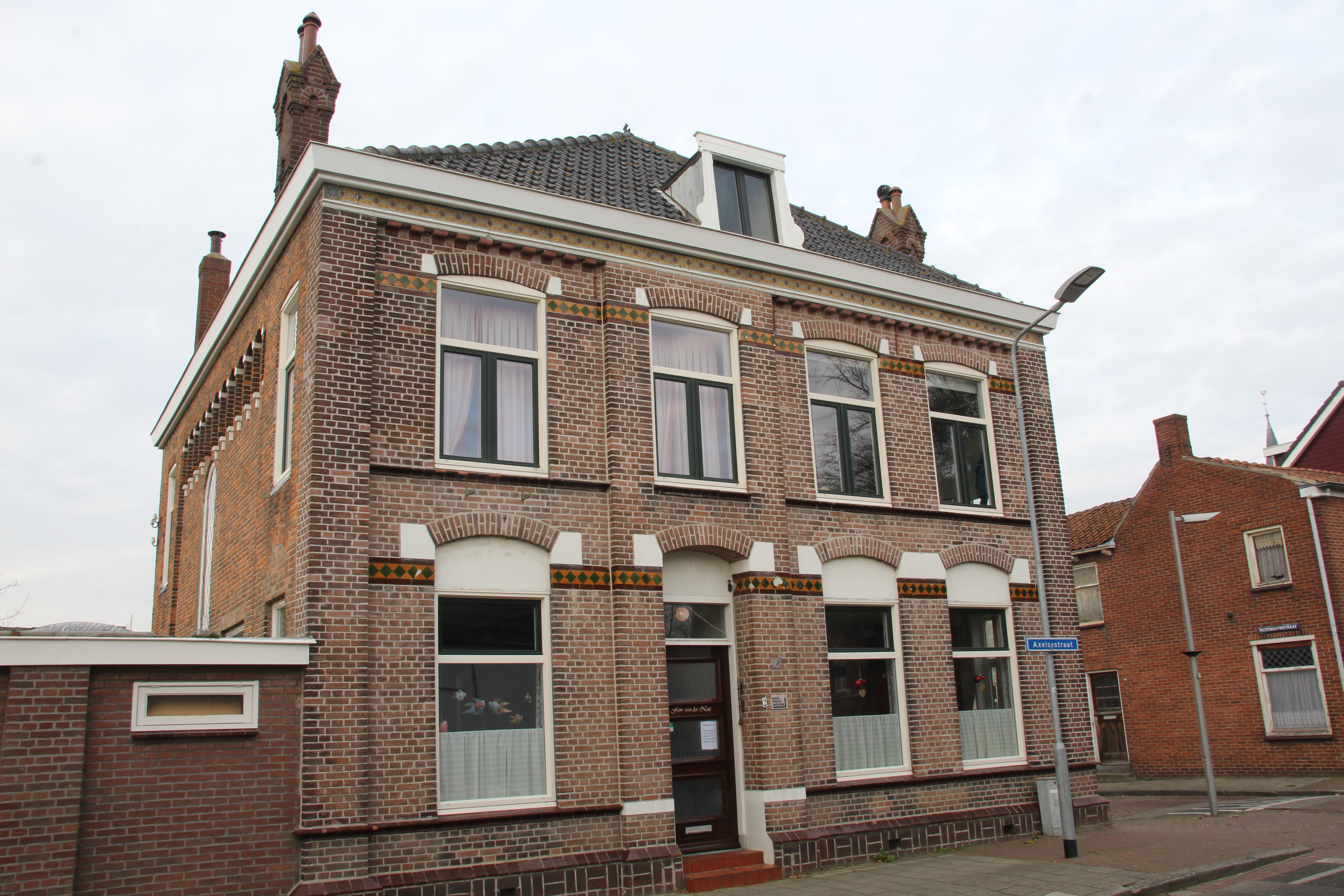
- Building in Zaamslag

- Flag Coat of arms

- Location in the province of Zeeland in the Netherlands Zaamslag (Netherlands)
- Coordinates: 51°18′45″N 3°54′47″E
- Country: Netherlands
- Province: Zeeland
- Municipality: Terneuzen

Area
  - Total: 36.15 km^{2} (13.96 sq mi)
- Elevation: 1.4 m (4.6 ft)

Population (2021)
  - Total: 2,755
  - Density: 76.21/km^{2} (197.4/sq mi)
- Time zone: UTC+1 (CET)
  - Summer (DST): UTC+2 (CEST)
- Postal code: 4543
- Dialing code: 0115

Zaamslag is a village in the Dutch province of Zeeland. It is a part of the municipality of Terneuzen, and lies about 28 km southeast of Vlissingen.

Zaamslag was a separate municipality until 1970, when it was merged with Terneuzen. Before being a municipality, it was a significant village in the Medieval Era (see below), and is a very important archaeological site.

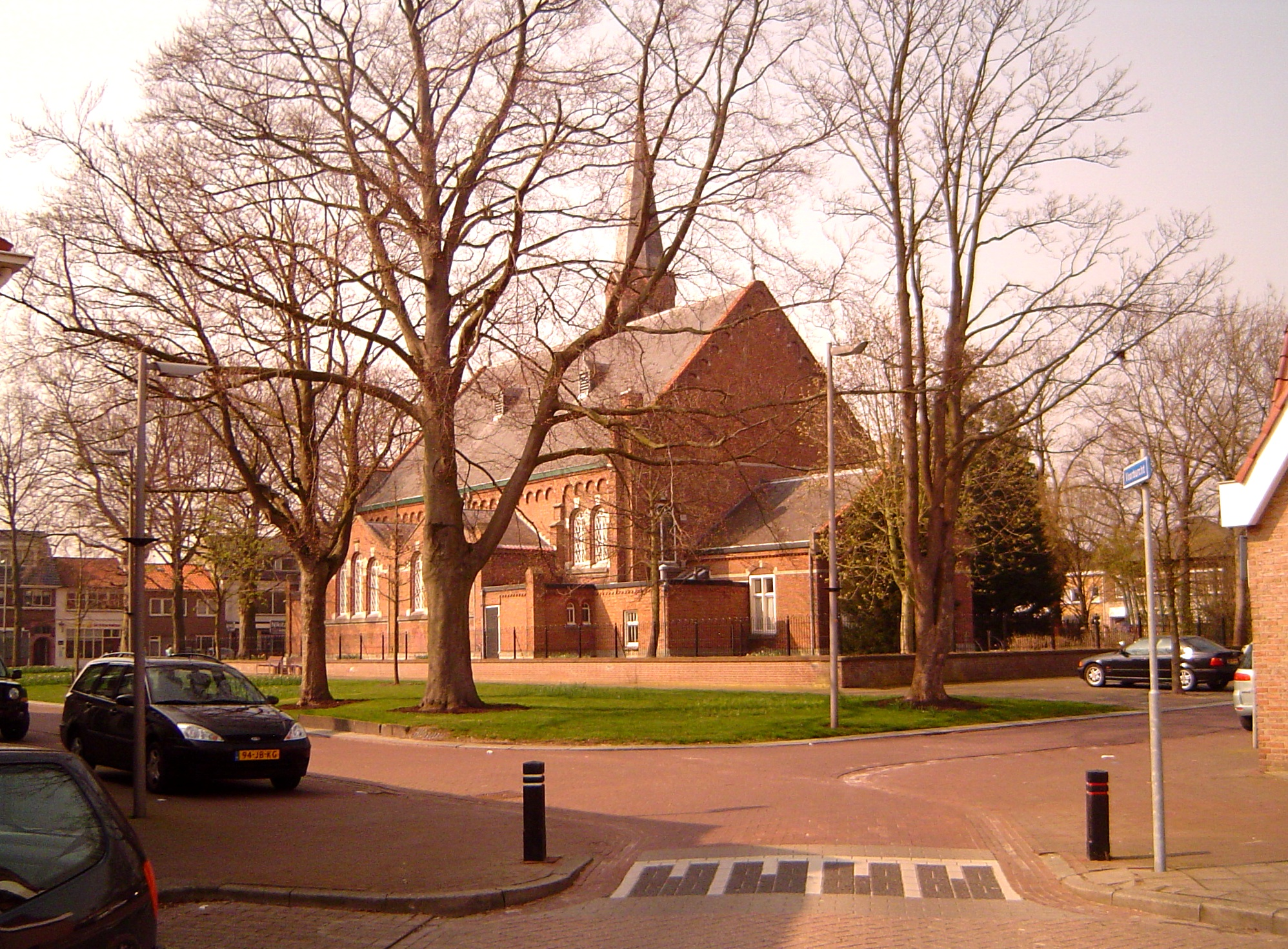
View to the main square at Zaamslag

== 'Stropielekkers' nickname ==
Zaamslag's residents are referred to as "Stropielekkers" (a.k.a. "syrup lickers"). The locals of nearby Axel are referred to as "Aerpelkappers," which is a customary moniker. The moniker first appeared in the 19th century; around 1870, a shopkeeper by the name of Valk operated a small store in the community. He bought barrels of syrup and brought them to the village on a cart; one day a barrel leaked, and the children of the village started gathering syrup. The incident was the start of this nickname tradition.

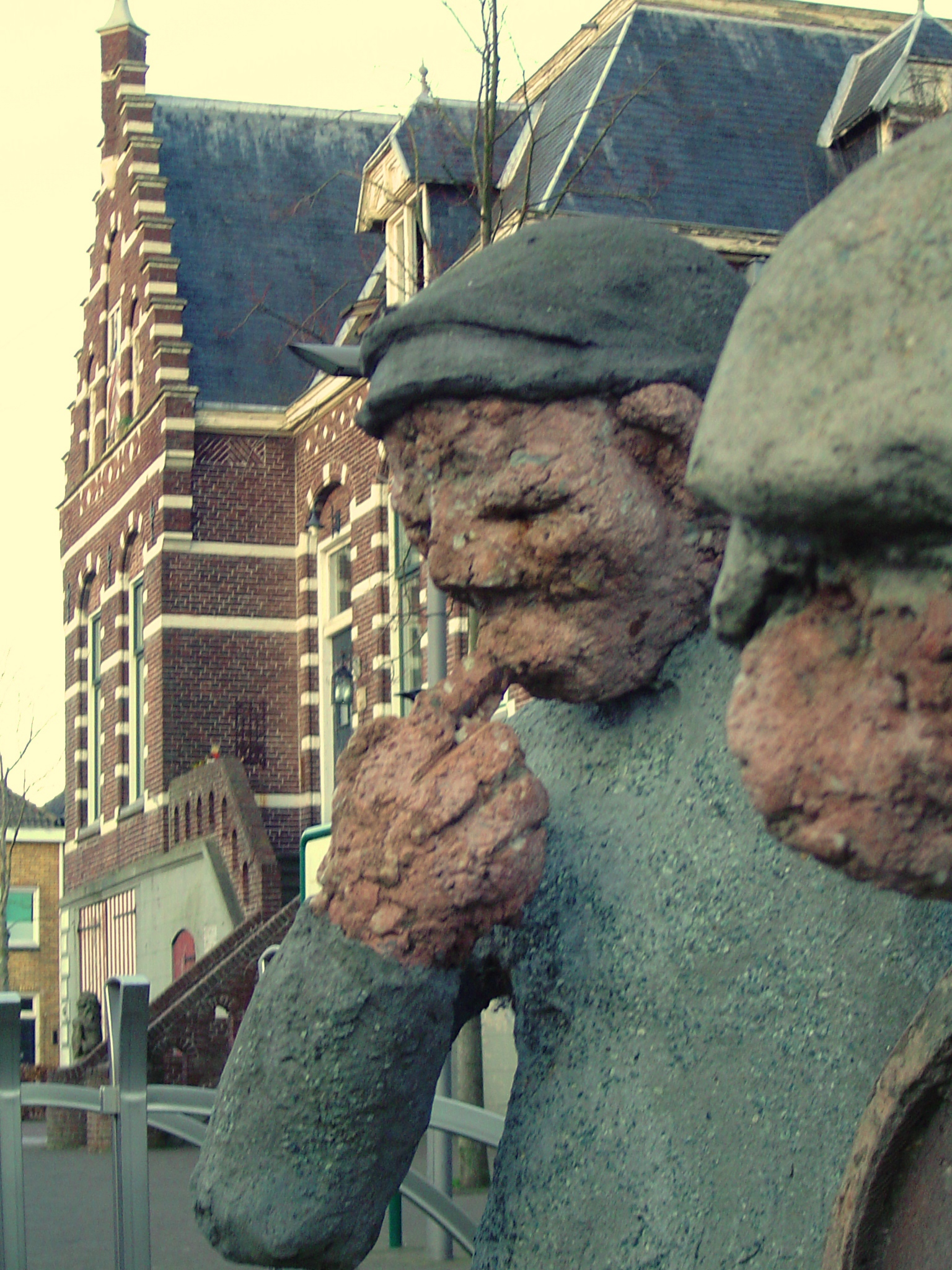
The Stropielekkers statue at the main square of Zaamslag

== History and archaeological evidence ==
=== Possible origins ===
The first signs of settlement in the area around modern-day Zaamslag are very scarce. During the construction of a new road alongside the village, some evidence of a prehistorical dwelling place was found, probably dating back to the Upper Palaeolithic – Lower Neolithic period. Some surrounding villages and archaeological sites hold evidence for prehistoric activity.

During the Roman occupation of the area, there was a fortress at the site of Aardenburg. The local tribe was the "Menapii". Some Roman coins were found at Zaamslag, which indicate a Roman origin; however, there is little actual evidence for a Roman predecessor of this village, and fixed structures have not been found.

=== Medieval era ===
During early medieval times, the climate in the area was harsh; Zeelandic Flanders (Zeeuws-Vlaanderen, the lowest part of the province of Zeeland) was almost entirely abandoned. The harsh climate affected many sites; older sites were sometimes buried under metres of sediment.

The village originated from around the year 1000. The centre of the village is at the top of a natural platform; in the middle of this settlement a church was built. Around the year 1200 a colossal cross-shaped church was built, surrounded by peasant houses and sheds.

Templar Knights settled near the village around 1200. They built an enormous preceptory, which lasted until long after their abolishment in 1312. In the 14th century, it was apparently used as a fortress in the conflict between Flemish and other rulers. A newspaper, which dates from the 1880s, tells us that there were two bodies found there. It should have been a burial, maybe two Templar lords. They may have also built the Hospital of the Knights of St. John; excavations in 2009 and 2010 revealed foundations of this ancient building. When the Templar preceptory was decreasing, the Hospital was increasing in power and wealth (starting from the 14th century). The building must have had a hall for the care of pilgrims and ill people. This hall should be built in the 13th century. From about 1330 on, the archives of the Hospital are preserved, and tell us the further history of the complex. In 1523, two Sisters in the Third Order of St. Francis started renovating the building, after it was abandoned by the Knights of St. John. In the year 1540, it was officially declared "Monastery" by Charles V.

Another important complex was Zaamslag Castle. Its Motte still survives, and is called Torenberg ("The Tower Mound", name originated in the 17th century). Part of the outer bailey was excavated in the 1987. The foundations of brick structures of the main entrance were found. In the old ditch several wooden beams were found, and dated by dendrochronology to around 1193. These would have belonged to an early tower of the castle. After the excavation most archaeological remains were removed and destroyed. Only the little "hill" of the castle, where the main tower once stood, was not excavated and is under archaeological protection. An early excavation in the 19th century found that within this hill there are structures like a tiled room with a small local prison.

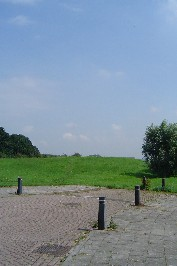
Remains Torenberg Castle in 2008

The lord of Zaamslag had many rights. He was involved in judgement, church affairs and landownership. The first lords of Zaamslag lived on the castle, but later generations preferred more cosy and modern castles above the Torenberg Castle. Some lived in Gent or in Brussels. One lord died in a conflict around Brussels in the 16th century. Another one was buried in an abbey in Gent.

During the Middle Ages, the village was situated on an island, with Othene and Aendijcke. This last village was lost in the 16th century and never rebuilt.

=== Towards modern times ===
During the Dutch Revolt there was a lot of violence in the area, and several villages were burnt down. Others were flooded by the sea. In 1584 Spanish troops burnt the village down. A poem remembers this (in old Dutch and in free English translation):

"Anno vijftienhondert tagtig en viere
den derde februarij dagh
toen zag men Zaamslagh
staen in gloeijende viere
gedaan door 't volk van 's Graven Holach
dat op de schanse binnen Ter Neuse lach."

"In the year fifteen hundred and eighty four
on the third day of february
men could see Zaamslag
burning in glowing fire
{which was} done by the people of the Earl of Holach
who were stationed in Terneuzen."

Around 1585 prince Maurice of Nassau was conquering the fortresses in the area. Some old sources claim that he also conquered the old Templar preceptory and the Torenberg Castle. The next year was very tough for the people of Zaamslag: there was much destruction, and people were in desperate need of food. In that year, the village was submerged, for military purposes (the water level was so high that it was impossible to cross it by wading or by boat). The main tower of the Torenberg Castle remained amongst the other ruins, and was used as lighthouse.

During the Reformation and the Dutch Revolt five churches were built. Two are now disused; every Sunday most of the inhabitants of Zaamslag and the small surrounding villages visit the other three. In 1658 a Reformed Church was built in a typical Dutch style in the middle of the village. In 1877 a tower, which still stands and is a landmark, was added at the front.

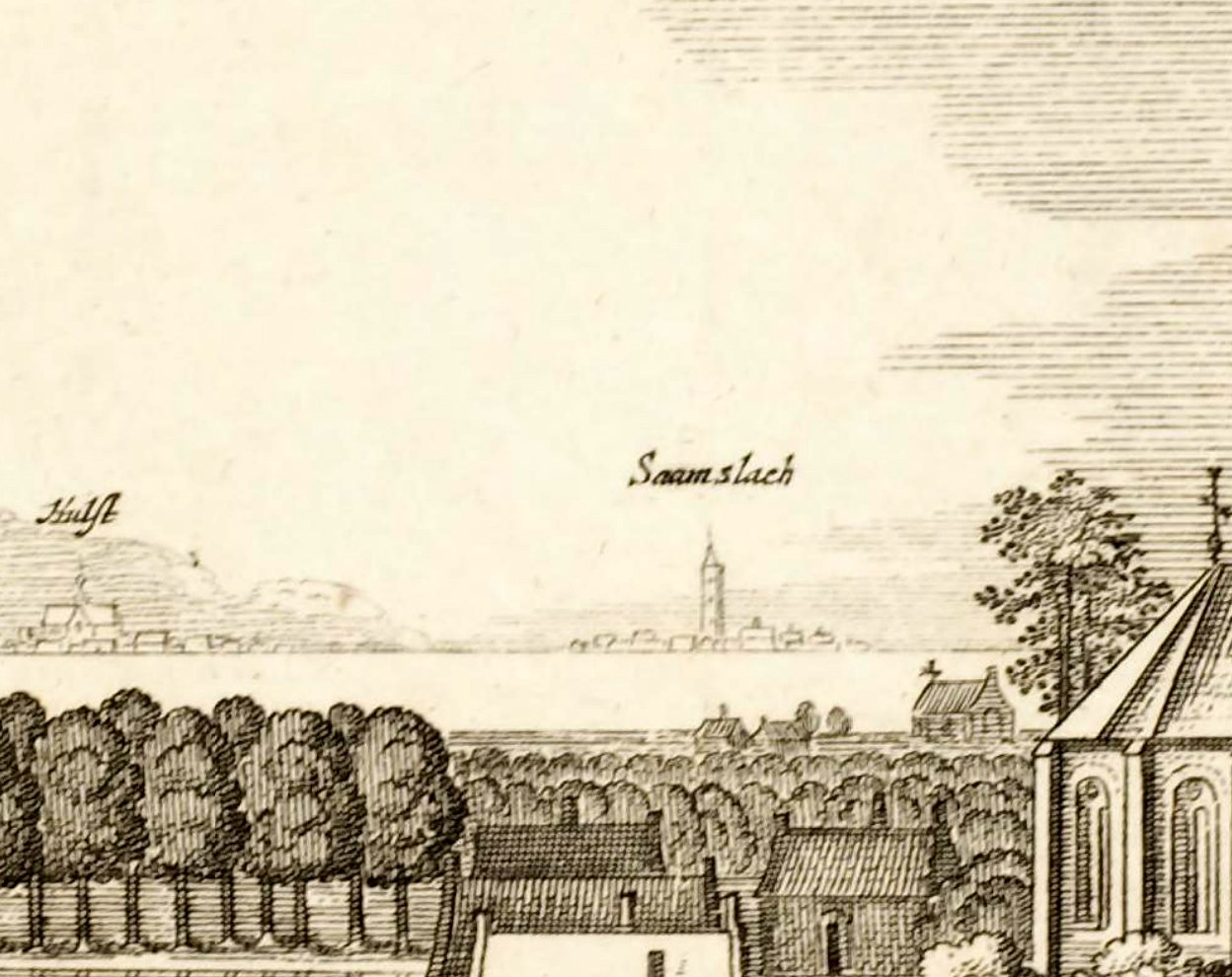
Zaamslag around 1660, with the old castle tower

The current Reformed Church was built in 1898; many local craftsmen were involved in this monumental project.

The former town hall was built in 1904, replacing a small building from 1788. Two statues of lions were placed at the steps of the new town hall. They are widely known and are maybe some hundreds of years old.

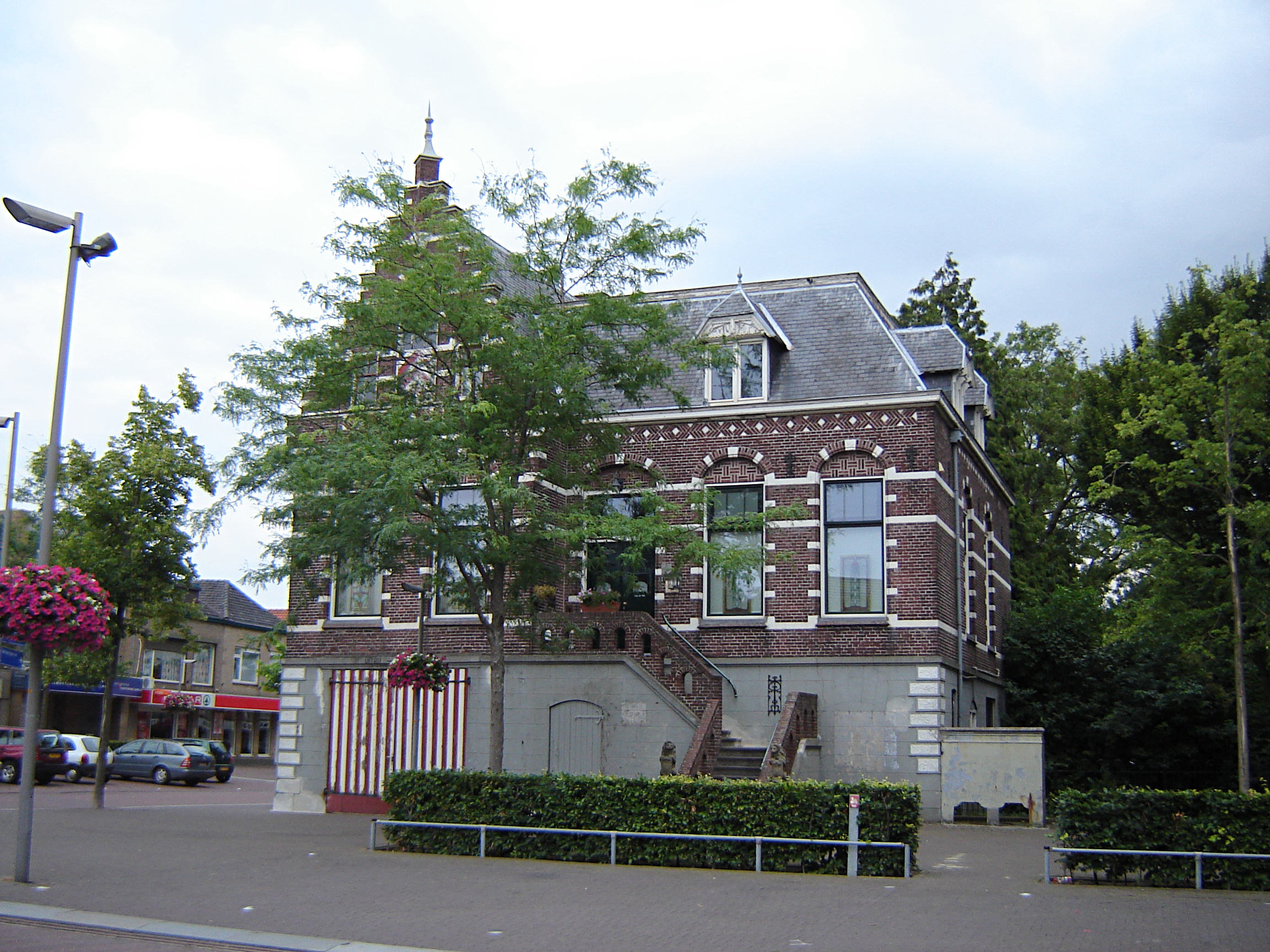
Old Town Hall

== Blue farms ==
Surrounding Zaamslag, there are some typical blue farms. Traditional local farm sheds have wooden walls, painted in black and decorated with white stripes. In Zaamslag sheds of this kind are blue; the origin of this habit is not clear, it could be due to a rich family, or old folk beliefs. The best-known row of these sheds is near the village of Othene.

== Important visitors ==
Zaamslag has received several important visitors. It also had a strong relation with the Dutch royal family.

- Around 1585 prince Maurice of Nassau conquered the forts and fortifications around Zaamslag.
- On 29 September 1811, emperor Napoleon Bonaparte visited the fortification at Griete (a little town, part of Zaamslag).
- In 1921 queen Wilhelmina and princess Juliana visited the farm of the De Kraker family. The queen was grateful to Sir De Kraker for his efforts during and after the First World War.
- On 14 May 1945, queen Wilhelmina visited the village again, after the liberation by the Allies. Zaamslag was liberated in September 1944.
- On 30 May 1945 Princess Juliana visited the village (the last royal visit).

== Museums ==
In Zaamslag, there are two museums open to the public:

- The Schelpenmuseum, with a collection of marine fauna and archaeological finds.
- The Minox Museum, about the Minox subminiature camera.

There are also many private collections in and around the village.

== Born in Zaamslag ==
- Jona Willem te Water (1740–1822), Professor at the University of Leiden
- Krijn Willemsen (1850), author
- H.A. Mulder (1906), author
- Jan J.B. Kuipers (1953), author
- George van Renesse (1909), famous pianist
- L.M. van Dis (1904), author

== Some literature about Zaamslag ==
- Baan, J. van der, Geschiedkundige beschouwing van Zaamslag. Terneuzen 1859.
- Platteeuw, J., Zaamslag door de eeuwen heen. Terneuzen 1968.
