= Museum Haarlem =

Museum in Haarlem, Netherlands

Coordinates: 52°22′38″N 4°38′03″E

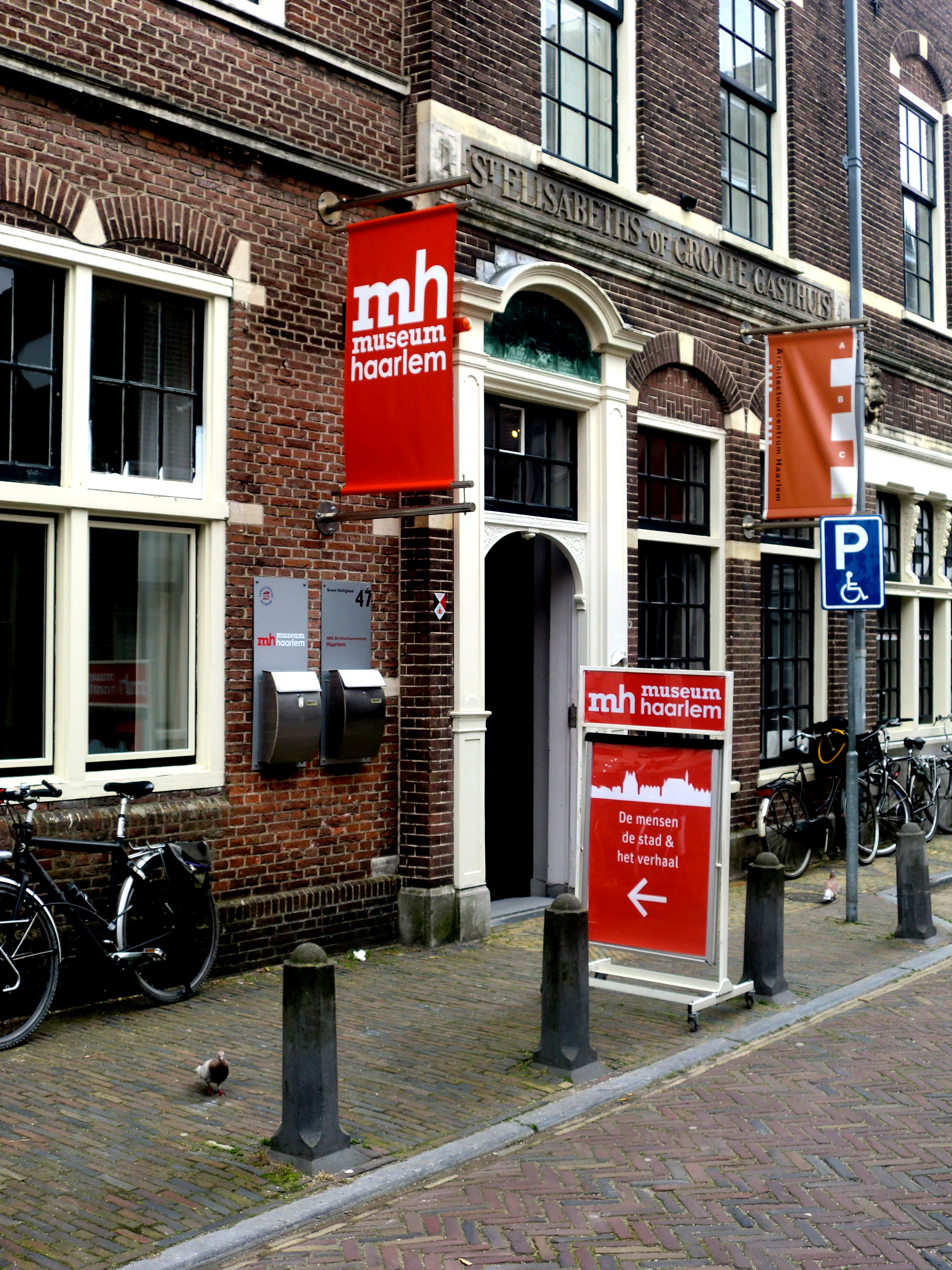
- Museum Haarlem
- Established: 1990
- Location: Groot Heiligland 47, Haarlem
- Visitors: 22,000 per year
- Website: verweymuseumhaarlem.nl/

The Verwey Museum Haarlem (former name: Museum Haarlem) is the city museum of Haarlem, Netherlands. It is situated at Groot Heiligland 47, across the street from the Frans Hals Museum. It shares an entrance with the ABC Architectuurcentrum Haarlem, which is located next door. The museum is devoted to presenting and preserving the cultural history of Haarlem and the surrounding region.

The name of the museum was changed from Museum Haarlem in 2022.

== History ==
In 1990 the museum was opened for the public in a building that was once part of the St. Elisabeth Gasthuis hospital. Abbreviated to "EG", the hospital was housed there in the former "Minder Broeders" monastery from 1581 until it moved in 1971 to the Boerhaavelaan. Today the hospital has fused with the St. Johannes de Deo hospital and is called the Kennemer Gasthuis. The museum is just one of several local cultural institutions sharing the historical hospital site which covers an entire city block surrounding the old monastery garden later redesigned by Zocher and now called the "Egelantiertuin". The museum entrance situated at Groot Heiligland 47 was previously the polyclinic entrance to the hospital, joining the former Jewish Hospital "Joles" to the St. Elisabeth's Gasthuis. The Joles hospital, which itself had only been established in 1929–1931, was often called mistakenly the "Sint Joles" by townsfolk, and had always been affiliated with the EG, though it is topped with a copper tower with a Jewish star. Since they shared the same medical staff and financial administration, the only real difference between the two hospitals was the food served to patients, since the Jewish community preferred Kosher meals. After being separated administratively from the EG in 1942 by the German occupying forces during WWII, the space was later formally annexed by the EG in the late 1940s due to a lack of Jewish patients.

== Collaboration with regional historical institutions ==
The history museum that opened in 1990 was formed by a collaboration of various Haarlem societies, most notably the Haarlem Historical Society, that formed in 1975. The collaboration, called "Historisch Museum Zuid-kennemerland", represents various historical groups from the region, including Haarlem, Schoten, Spaarndam, Heemstede, Bloemendaal, Santpoort and Zandvoort.

== Collection ==
The museum hosts a collection of historical paintings and artefacts, including items from the collection of the Coen Cuser Stichting, a former orphanage that has been converted to apartments, but whose line of regents live on in their Stichting. Their original builder's maquette by J.A.G. van der Steur of the Coen Cuserhof is on display. In the timeline room there are artifacts regarding Haarlem's history from 1245 to modern times and in the small auditorium a statue of Laurens Janszoon Coster stands next to an old book press. The museum has a fifteen-minute film in Dutch or in English about the history of Haarlem that is often used by walking tours or other groups that can be run on request for any visitors interested, which touches on the history from the siege of Haarlem in 1568-1572 up to the first railway locomotive (Arend) and the first flight of the Fokker Spin. The museum works together with schools and other museums in Haarlem, and often hosts temporary exhibitions on Kennemerland history.

There is a combi-pass available for visitors choosing to visit both the Frans Hals Museum and the Museum Haarlem on the same day.

== Governance ==
In 2024, the museum had 19,240 visitors. There were four full time members of staff, and 85 volunteers. The yearly was budget was around 370,000 Euros. Anne van Lienden becomes the new director in 2025. She replaces Laura van der Wijden, who was in charge for fourteen years.

== Gallery ==
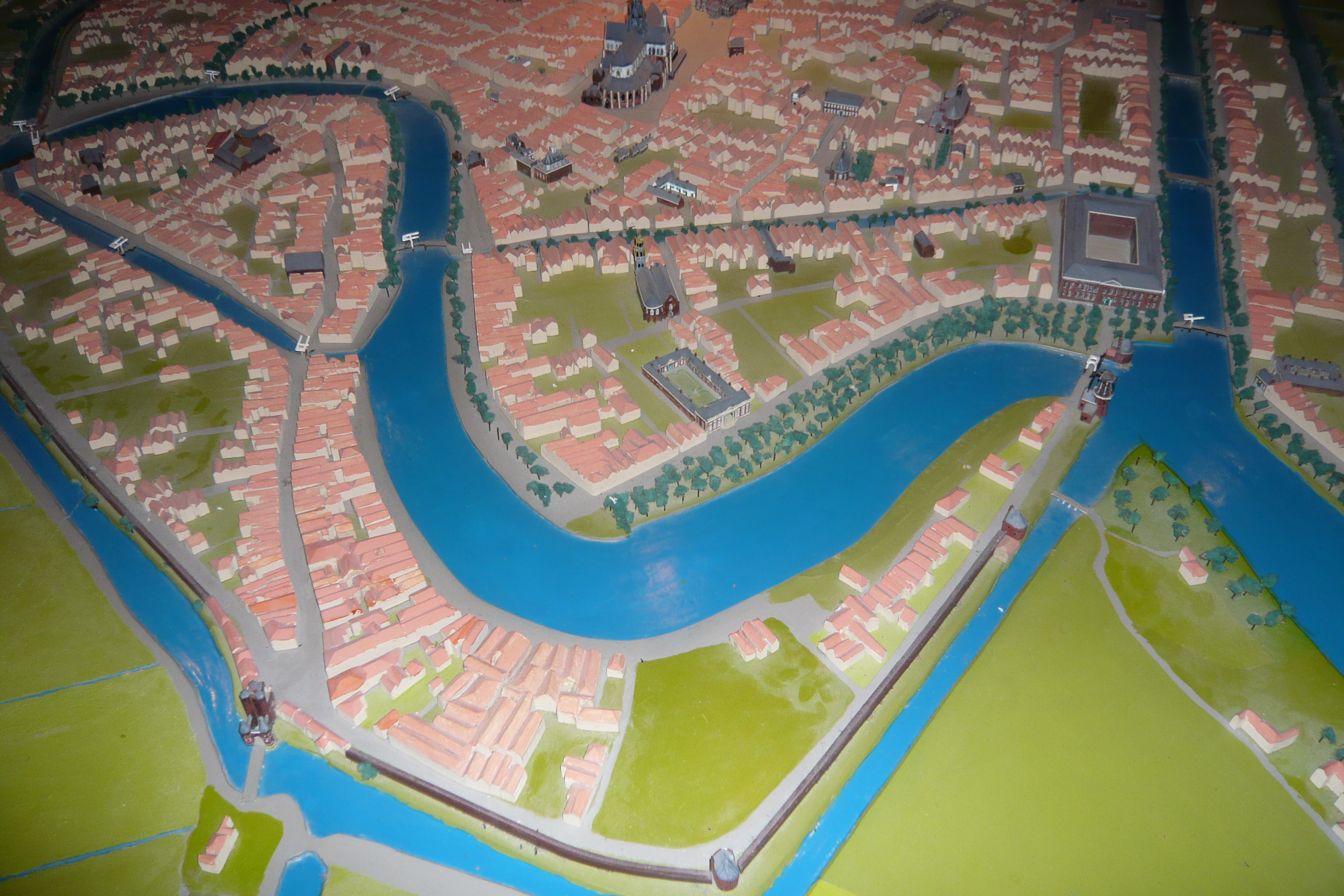
Maquette of Haarlem based on the "Nautz" map from 1827, on display in the museum.

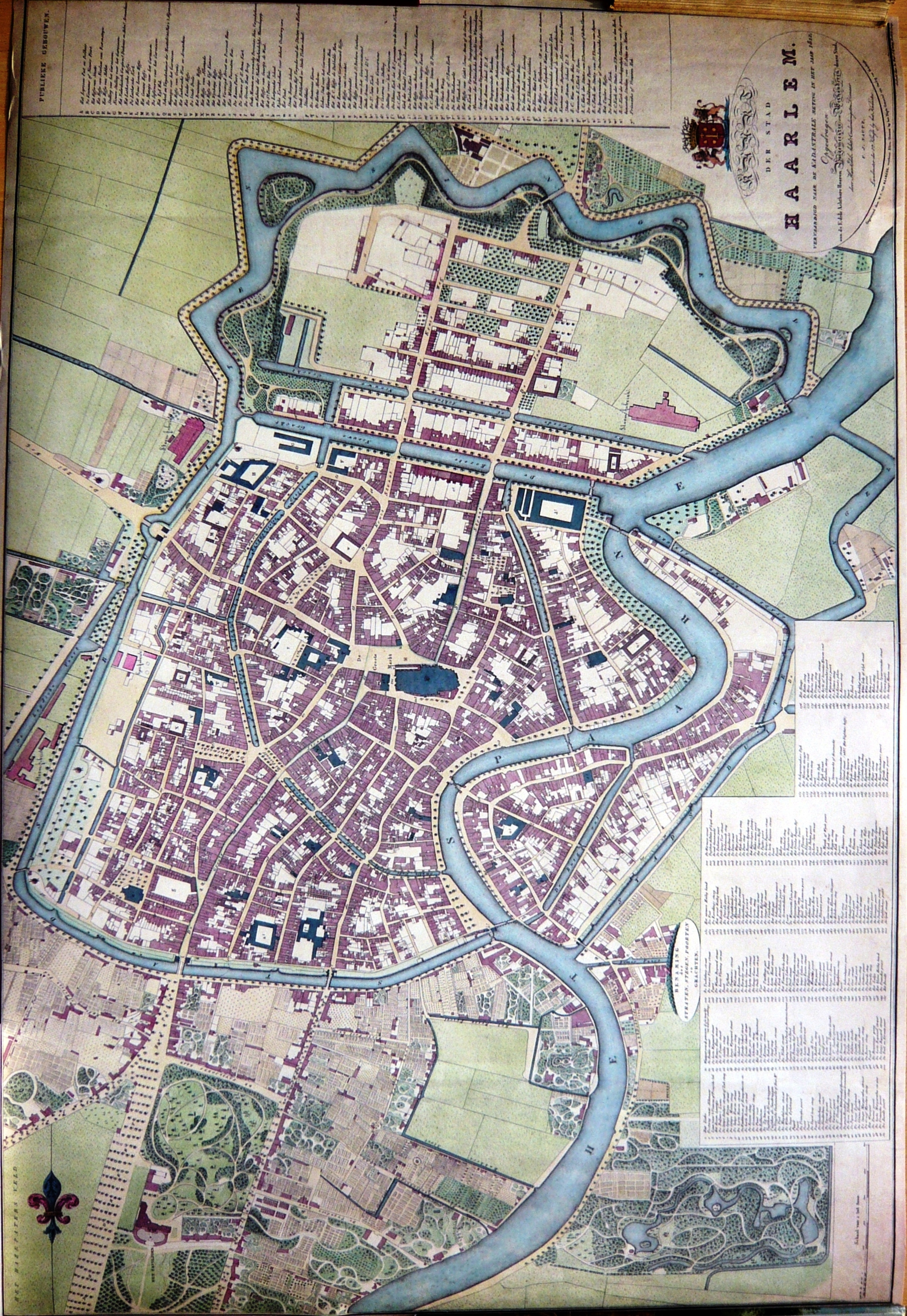
Reproductions of old maps, including the Nautz map, are also for sale there

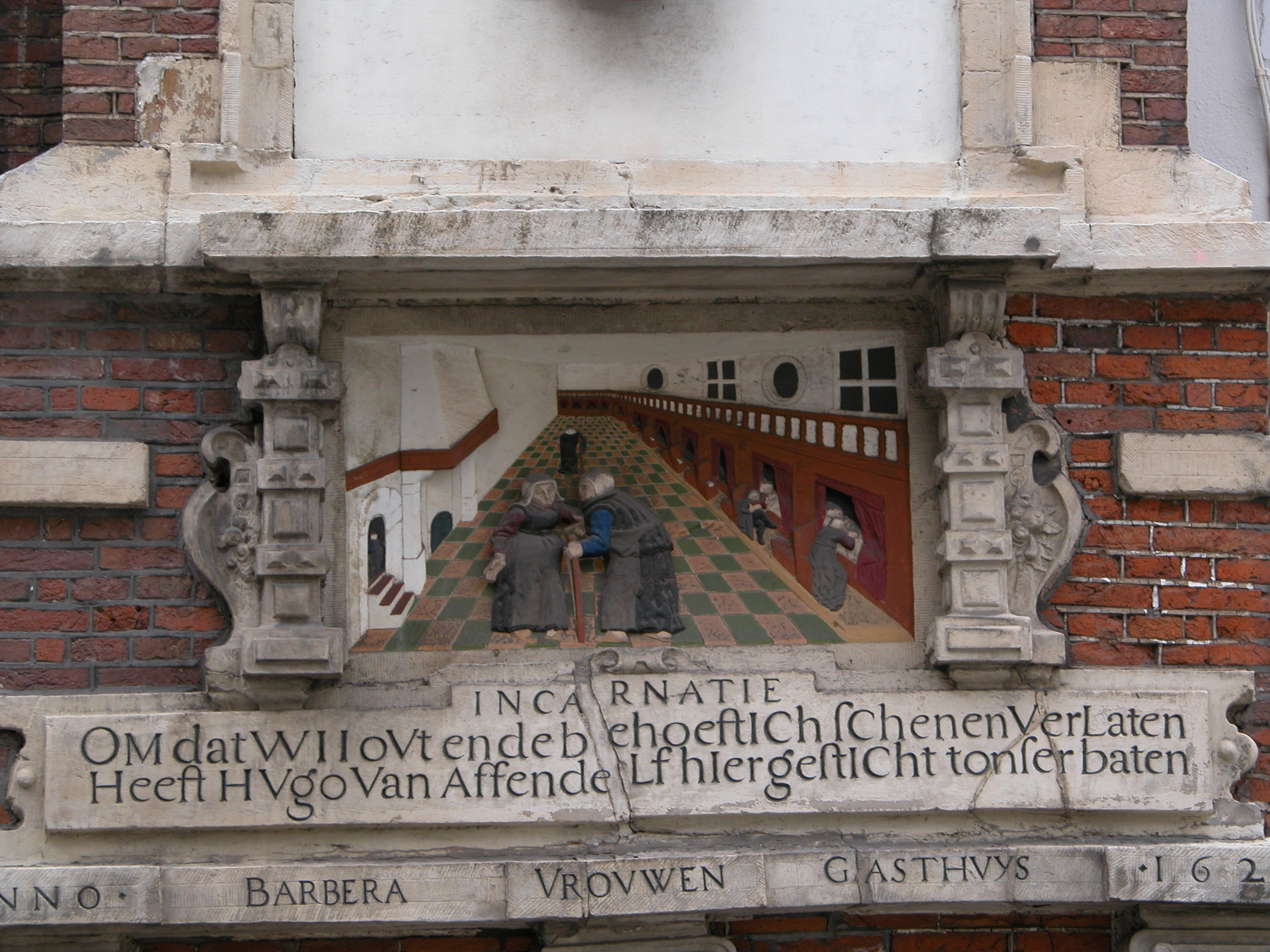
The museum sells small magnets representing old gable stones, including gable stones from Haarlem

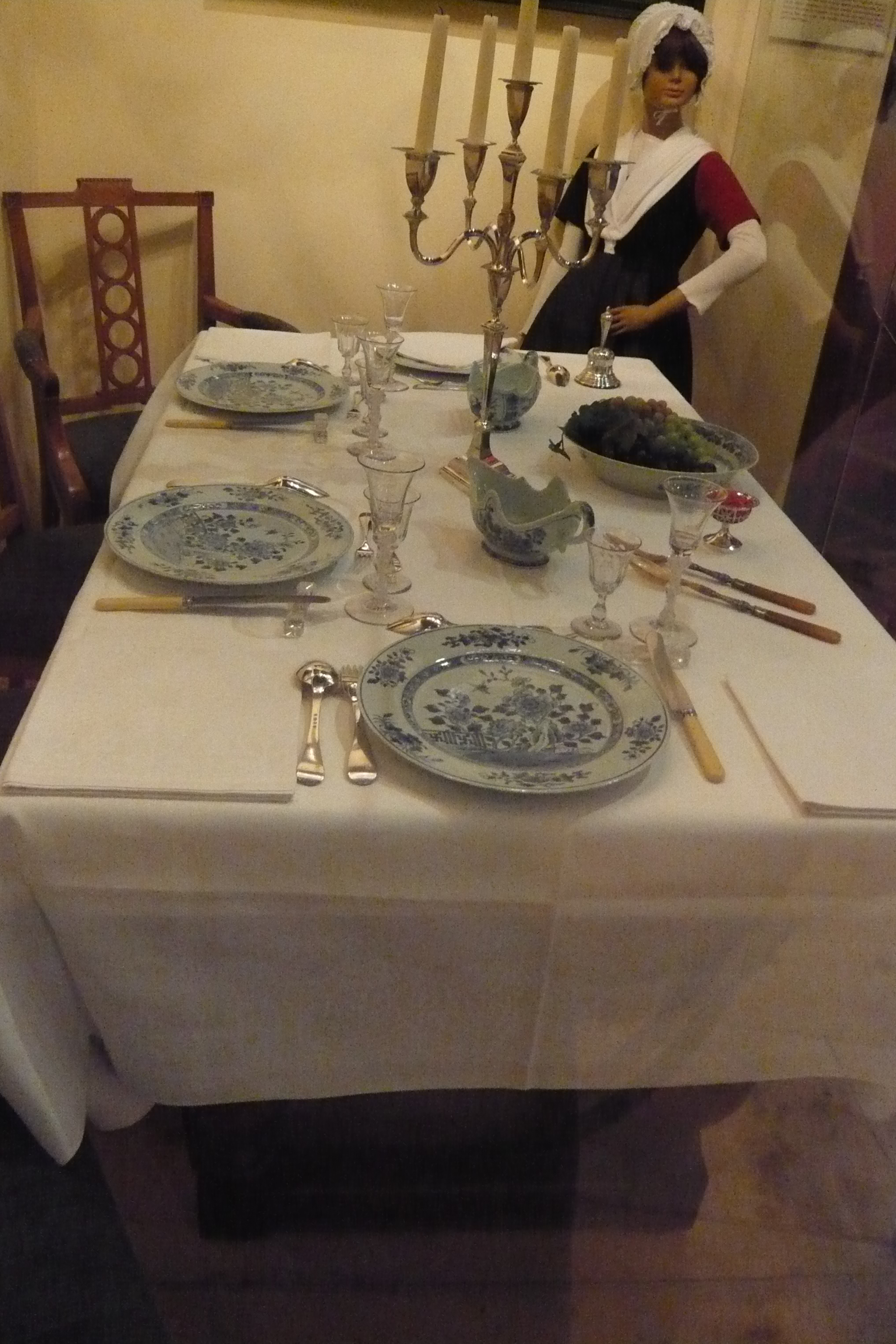
Dinner table set for the regents of the Coen Cuser Stichting, the Haarlem orphanage that is now defunct, but was formerly located on the Olieslagerslaan

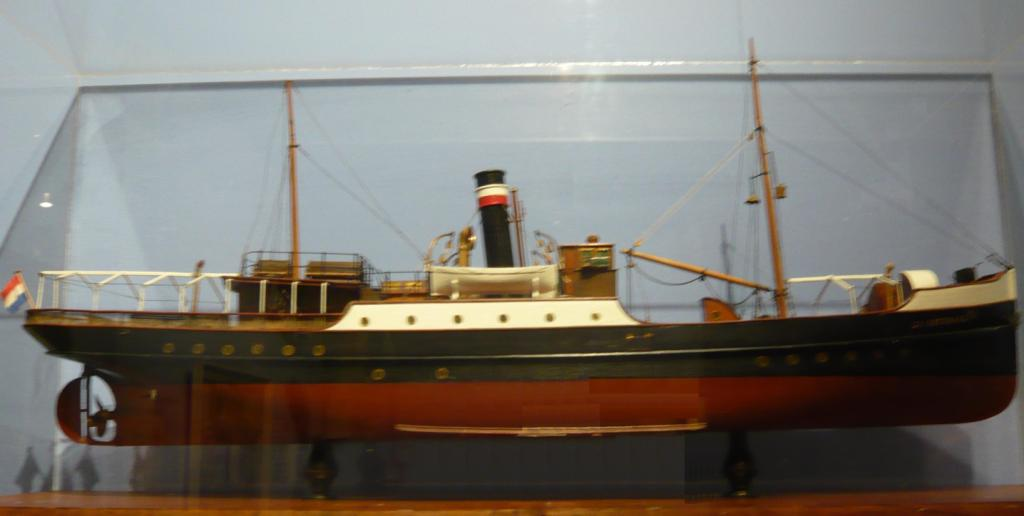
Model ship "De Dageraad", model of the first ferry for Royal TESO that was built at the (now defunct) Haarlem shipyard N.V. Werf Hubertina

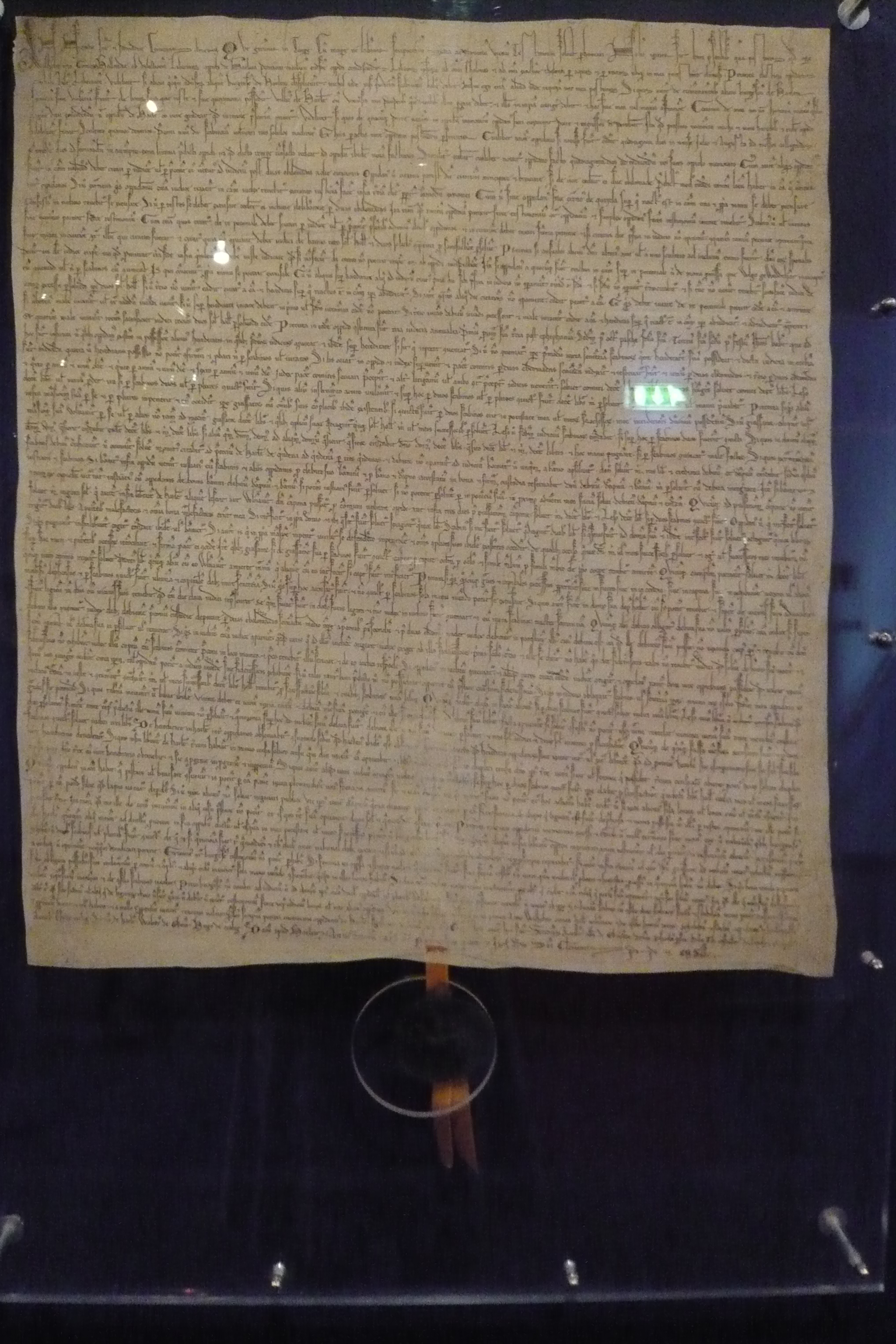
On display is a copy of the Haarlem city rights that were given to Haarlem in 1245 by William II of Holland.
