= Coen Cuserhof =

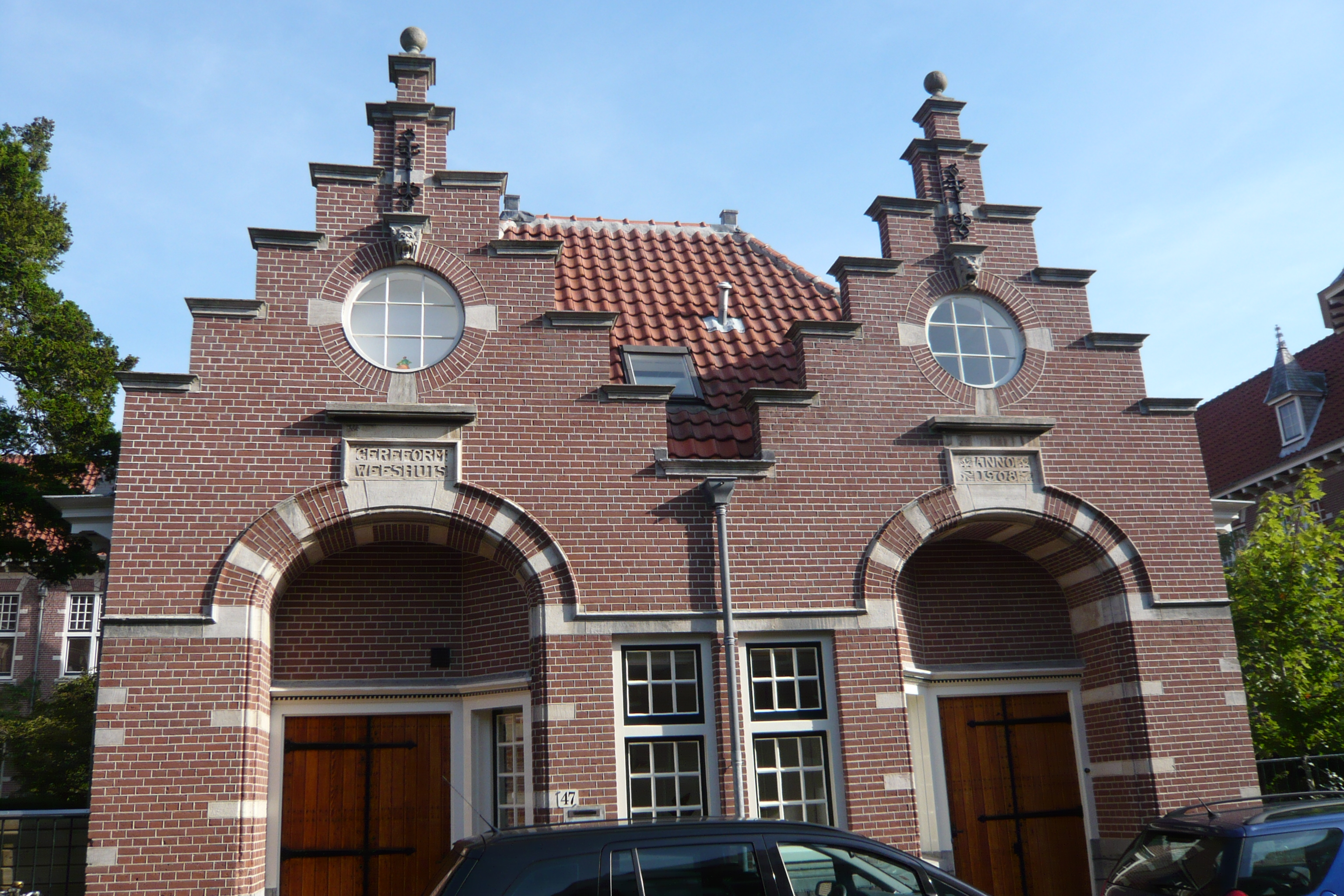
- Gate houses of the orphanage, today converted to apartments
- Interactive map of the Coen Cuserhof area

General information
- Type: orphanage
- Architectural style: neo-classical
- Location: Haarlem, Olieslagerslaan 5
- Coordinates: 52°22′26.32″N 4°37′28.42″E
- Completed: 1908

Design and construction
- Architect: J.A.G. van der Steur

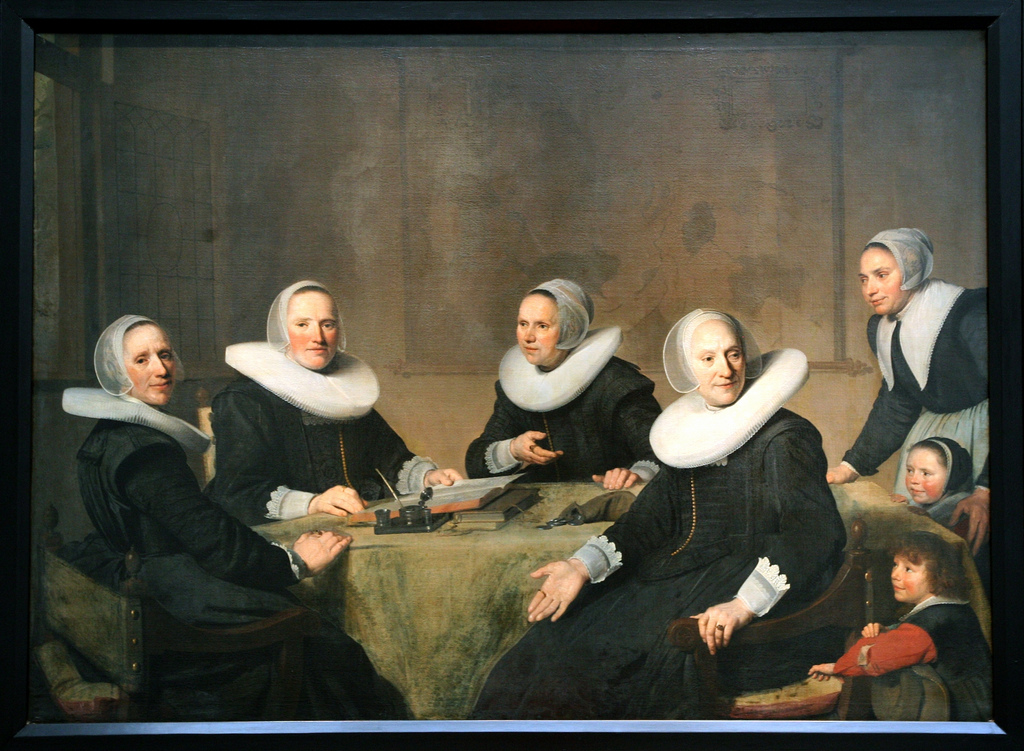
Regentesses of the Heilige Geesthuis in Haarlem, on the right a boy points to his red sleeve, by Johannes Cornelisz Verspronck, 1662

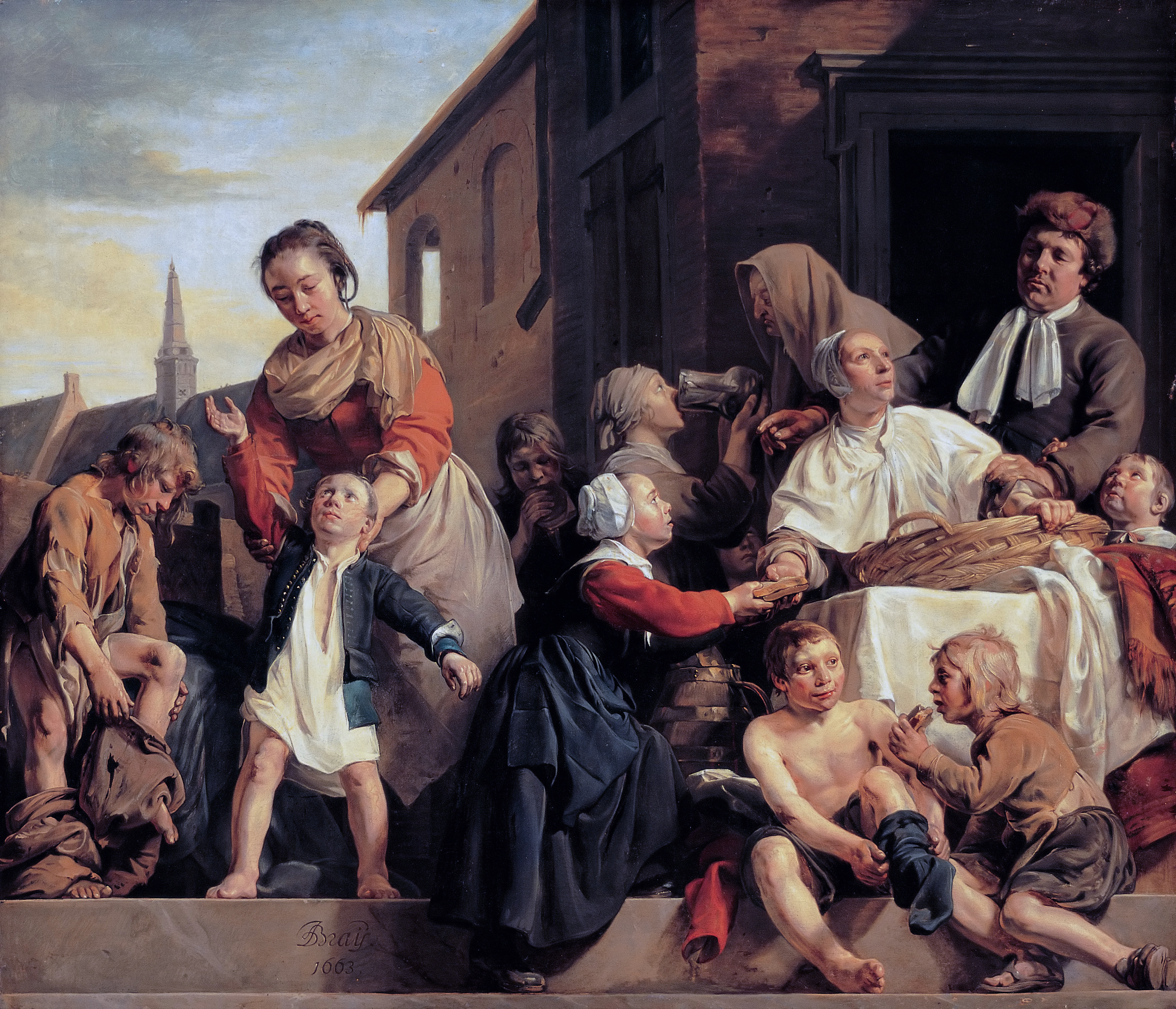
Caring for orphans, by Jan de Bray, 1675. This painting shows the characteristic Haarlem clothing of the "Burger Weeshuis" orphans with one red sleeve and one blue sleeve. The tower on the left was on top of the Heilige Geesthuis on the Krocht.

The Coen Cuserhof is a former orphanage in Haarlem. The complex was designed by J.A.G. van der Steur and the original maquette is on display in the Historisch Museum Haarlem.

== History ==
The building is named after the society that ran the orphanage, the Stichting Coen Cuser Huis, which is named after the original benefactor Coen Cuser, a Haarlem knight who founded a house for the poor on the Krocht in Haarlem in 1394. That original building, the Heilige Geesthuis, has been torn down and the land is now the location of the Hofje van Oorschot. From 1765 to 1808, the Coen Cuser orphanage (also called the Burger Weeshuis) was located on the Kinderhuisvest. In 1808, the orphanage moved to the Diakonie on the Koudenhorn (currently the location of the Haarlem police headquarters). In 1810, they moved again to the Klein Heiligland in the quarters of the former old men's almshouse (currently the location of the Frans Hals Museum). In 1908, the orphanage moved to the Olieslagerslaan to the Coen Cuserhof, where the orphanage closed in 1988, since by then the care for most Haarlem orphans was done by the federal authorities.

Notable residents of the orphanage were Jacobus van Looy who grew up in the orphanage when it was located in the Klein Heiligland, and Miep den Oude-Snel, who wrote the book "Miep" about her experiences in the Coen Cuserhof. Until 1933, the children were still wearing uniforms with one red sleeve and one blue sleeve. The Haarlem Mennonite philanthropist Pieter Teyler van der Hulst left funds in 1778 to organize a yearly party in his name for all the orphans of Haarlem, to be held in the Doopsgezinde Weeshuis (Mennonite orphanage). The tradition was still held in Miep's time at the beginning of the 20th century, though the location had changed and was the Mennonite orphanage on the Kleine Houtweg. Miep recalled being jealous of the Mennonite orphans who had brown dresses.
