= ABC Architectuurcentrum Haarlem =

Museum in Haarlem, the Netherlands

Coordinates: 52°22′38″N 4°38′03″E

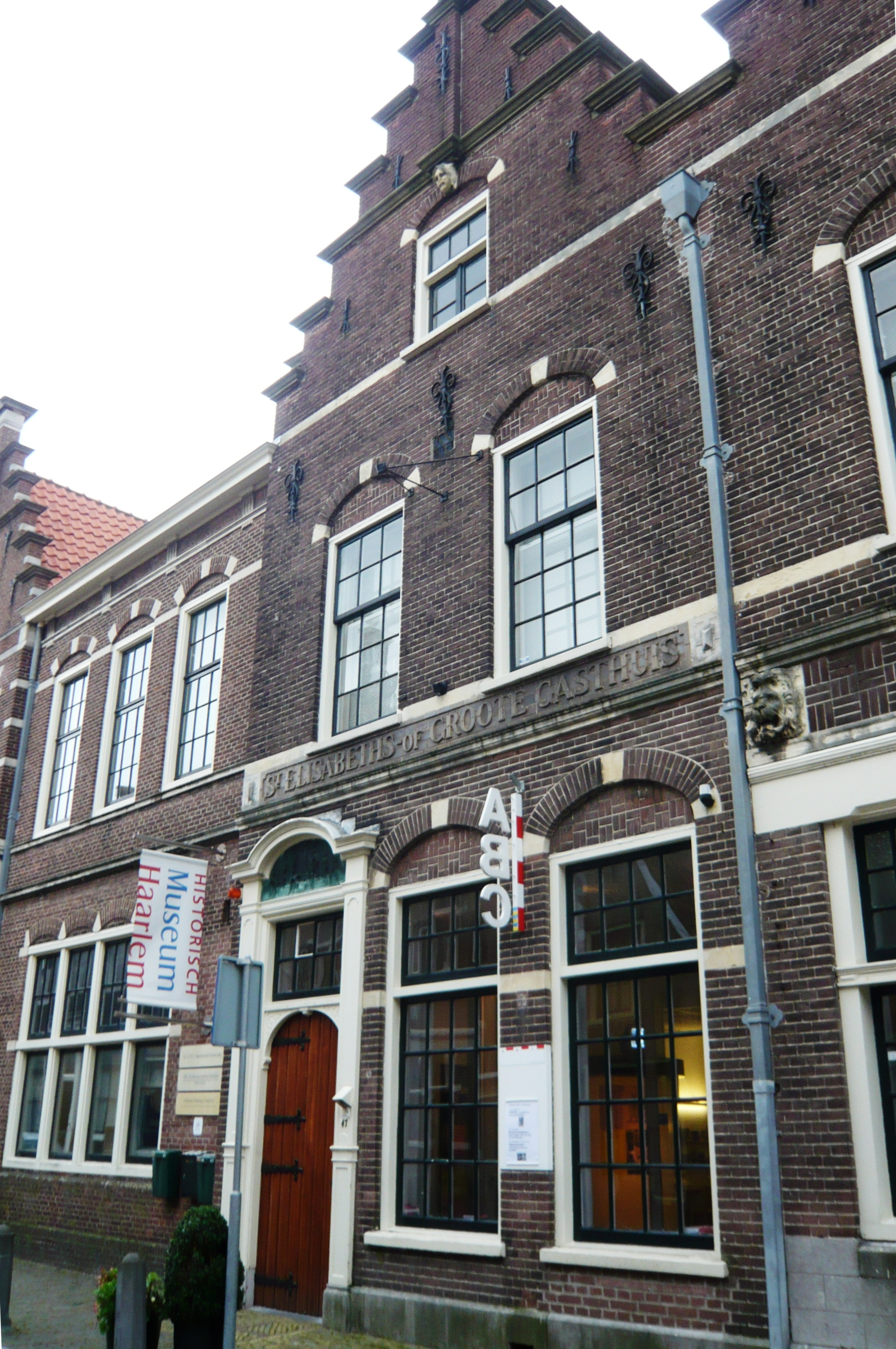
Entrance ABC Architectuurcentrum

The ABC Architectuurcentrum Haarlem is a center for Architecture in Haarlem, the Netherlands, dedicated to promoting interest and conserving the architectural heritage of Kennemerland.

The center was formed in 1989 and aims to inform all those involved in the building sector of current plans and events regarding large projects in the Haarlem area. The center has a core group of five part-time workers, and the rest of its activities (including the reception area) are staffed and supported by a small army of volunteers. It is located in the former polyclinic of the St. Elisabeth Gasthuis, Haarlem on the Groot Heiligland 47, across from the Frans Hals Museum, and shares its front door with the Historisch Museum Haarlem, which is located next door. The center is open from Tuesday-Saturday from 12:00 to 17:00 and on Sundays from 13:00 to 17:00. The rooms can be rented for gatherings and group activities are regularly organized there.
