= St. Elisabeth Gasthuis, Haarlem =

St. Elisabeth Gasthuis
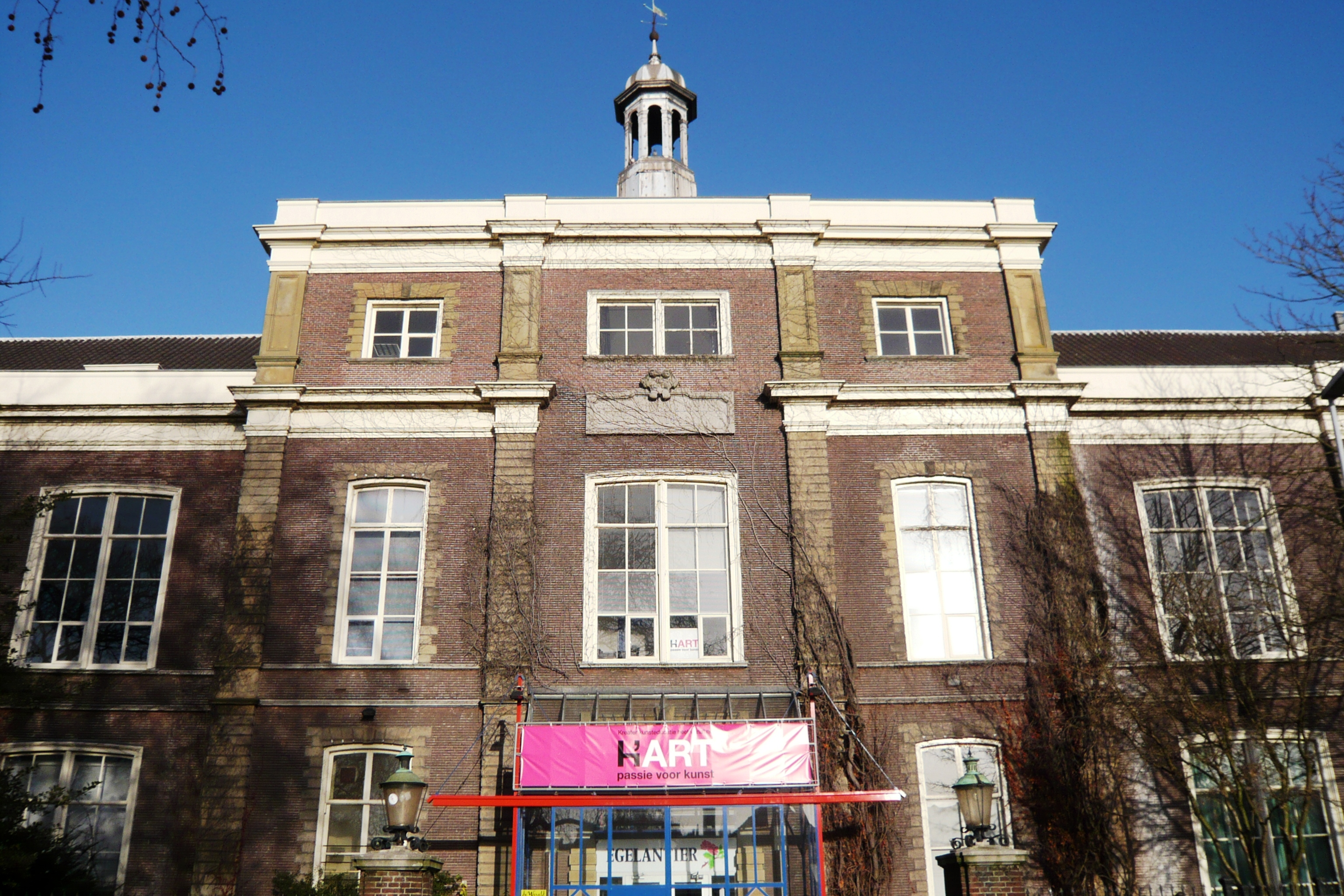
- Former main entrance, today the Egelantier
- Interactive map of the St. Elisabeth Gasthuis area

General information
- Type: hospital
- Architectural style: neo-classical
- Location: Haarlem, Gasthuisvest 47
- Coordinates: 52°22′34.60″N 4°38′3.65″E
- Completed: 1871

The St. Elisabeth Gasthuis (EG) is a former hospital complex of buildings founded in 1581 in Haarlem on the Gasthuisvest. The last location of the hospital on the Boerhaavelaan retains its hospital function and is part of the Spaarne Gasthuis (SG) today, formerly known as Kennemer Gasthuis (KG). The hospital complex on the Gasthuisvest was built for the "Minnebroers" monastery and was reclaimed after the Protestant reformation in 1581 and given by the city council to the hospital. As a hospital during four centuries, the complex underwent many major renovations. The main facade dates from 1871.

== History of the building ==
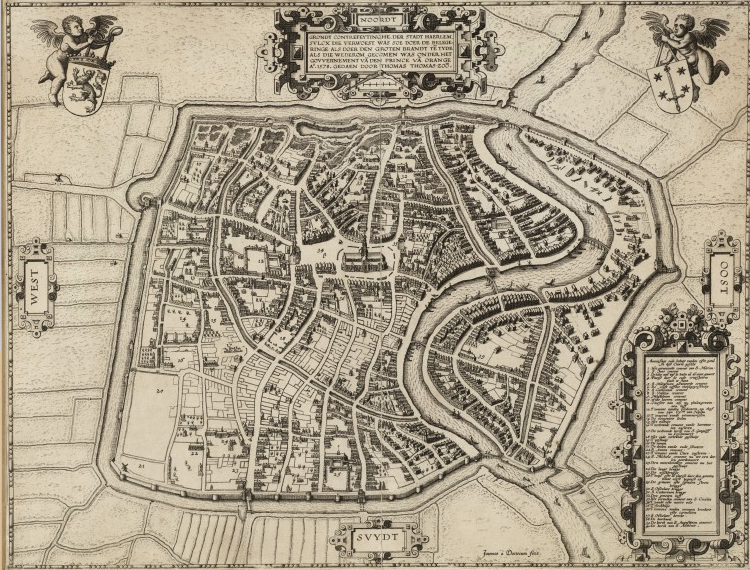
Map of Haarlem in 1578 after the fire of 1572 wiped out a large part of the city. The old location on the Verwulft was lost.

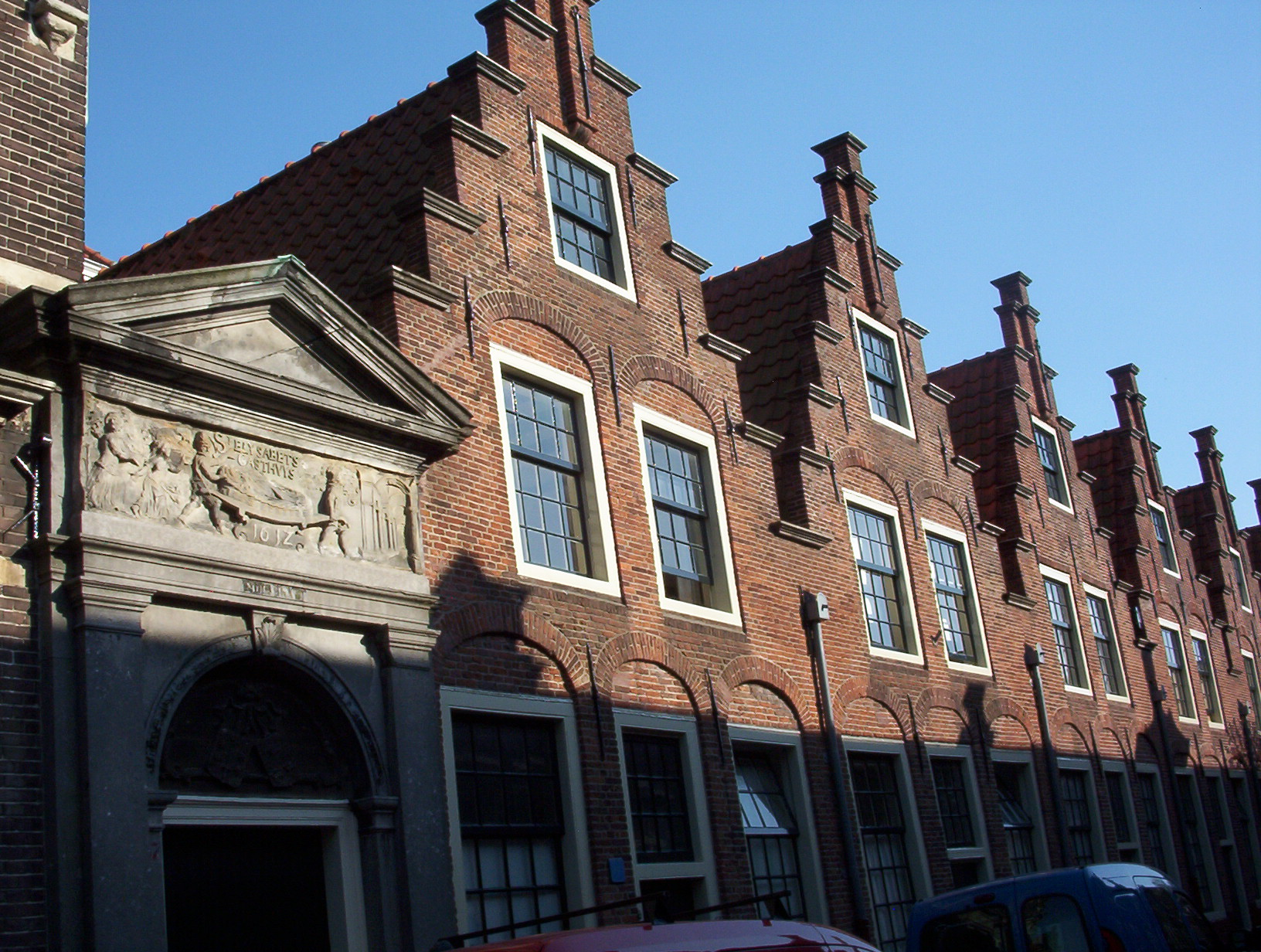
Facades of the old pensioner's homes in the Groot Heiligland with the old gate to the courtyard in the foreground.

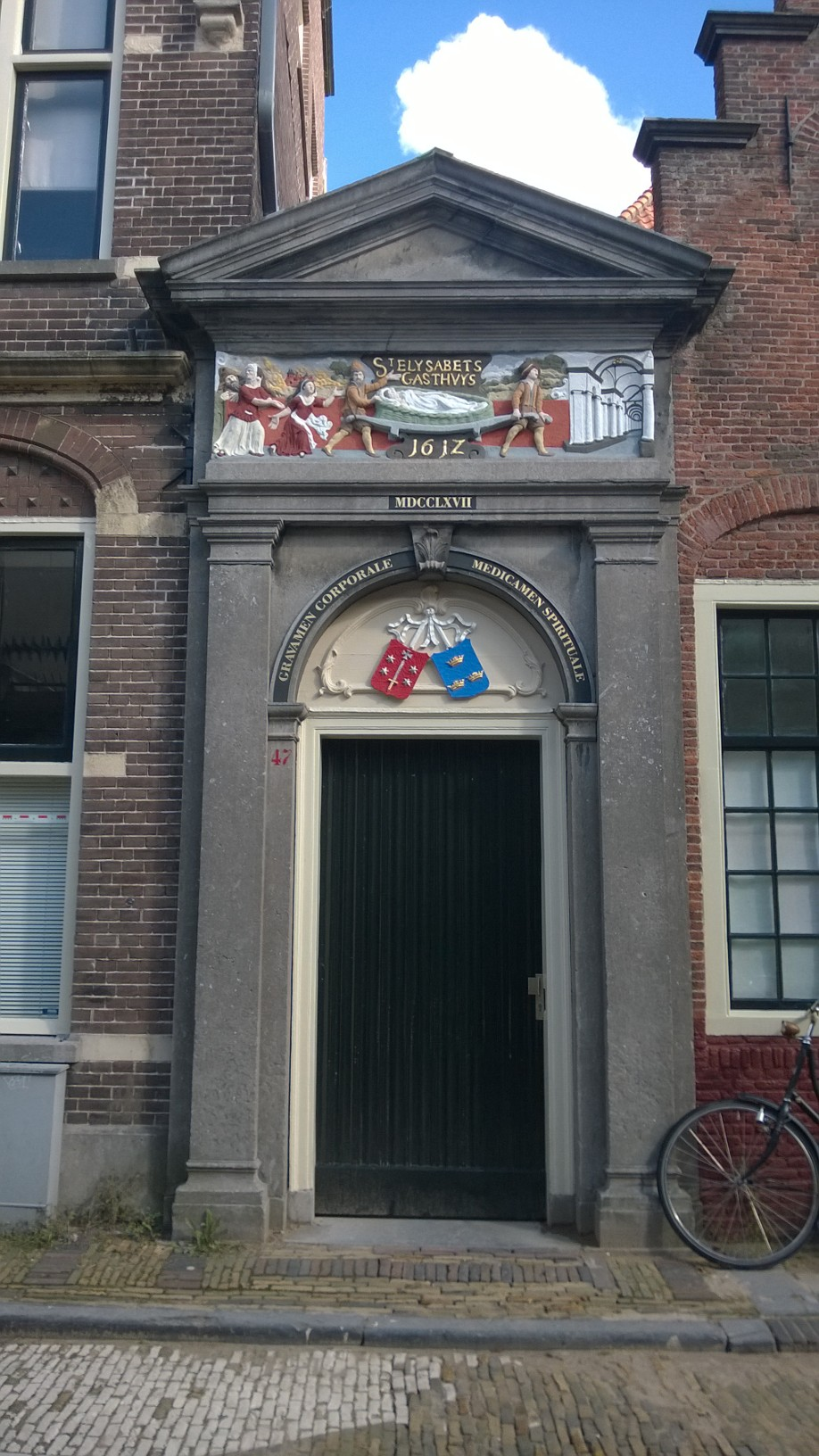
Newly painted Elisabeth Gasthuis Poort doorway next to the old pensioner's homes, showing old gable stone from 1612 with a patient in a basket on a stretcher (Dutch: lappenmand)

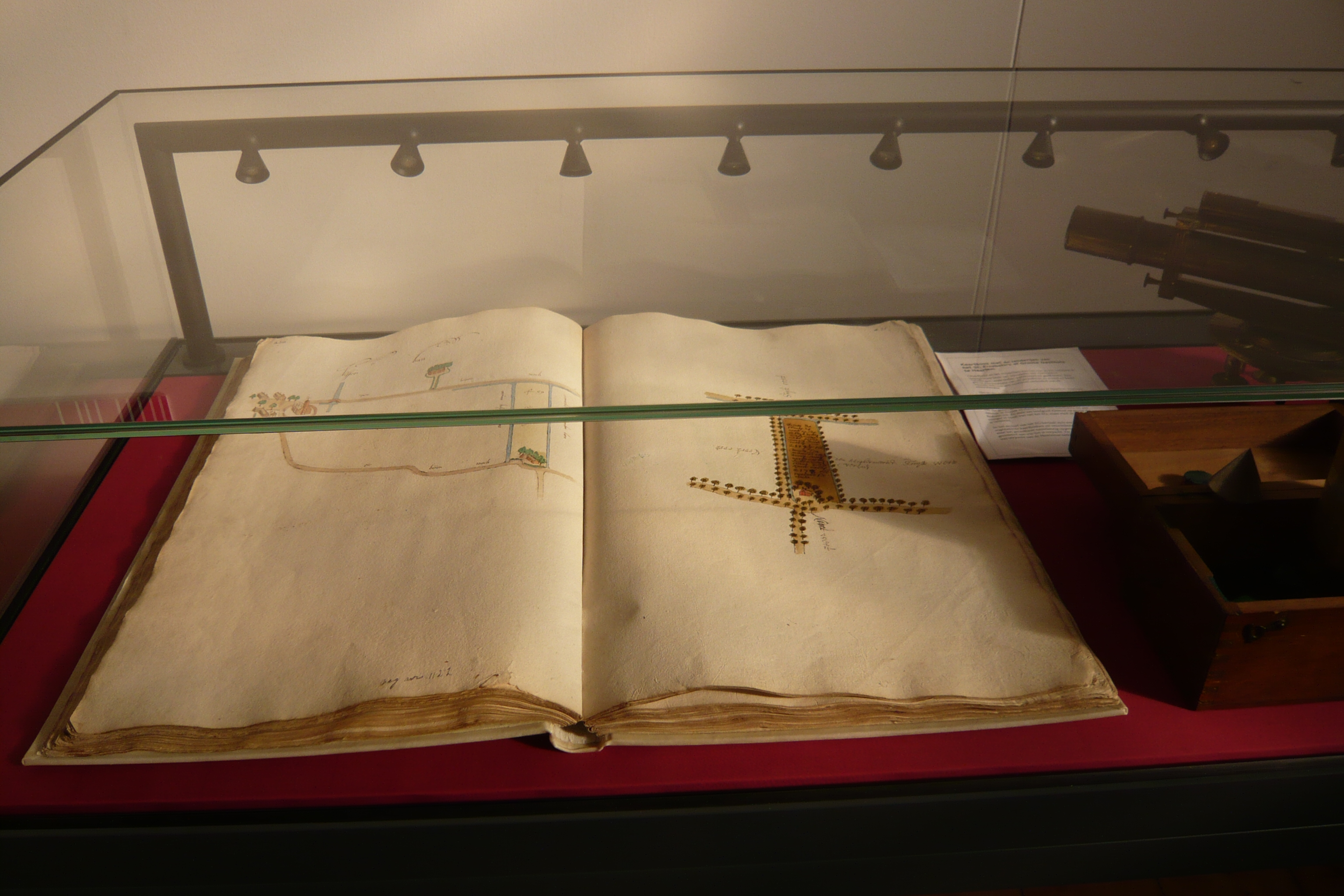
Book of maps of all the lands administered by the Elisabeth Gasthuis in 1635, with maps by Pieter Wils.

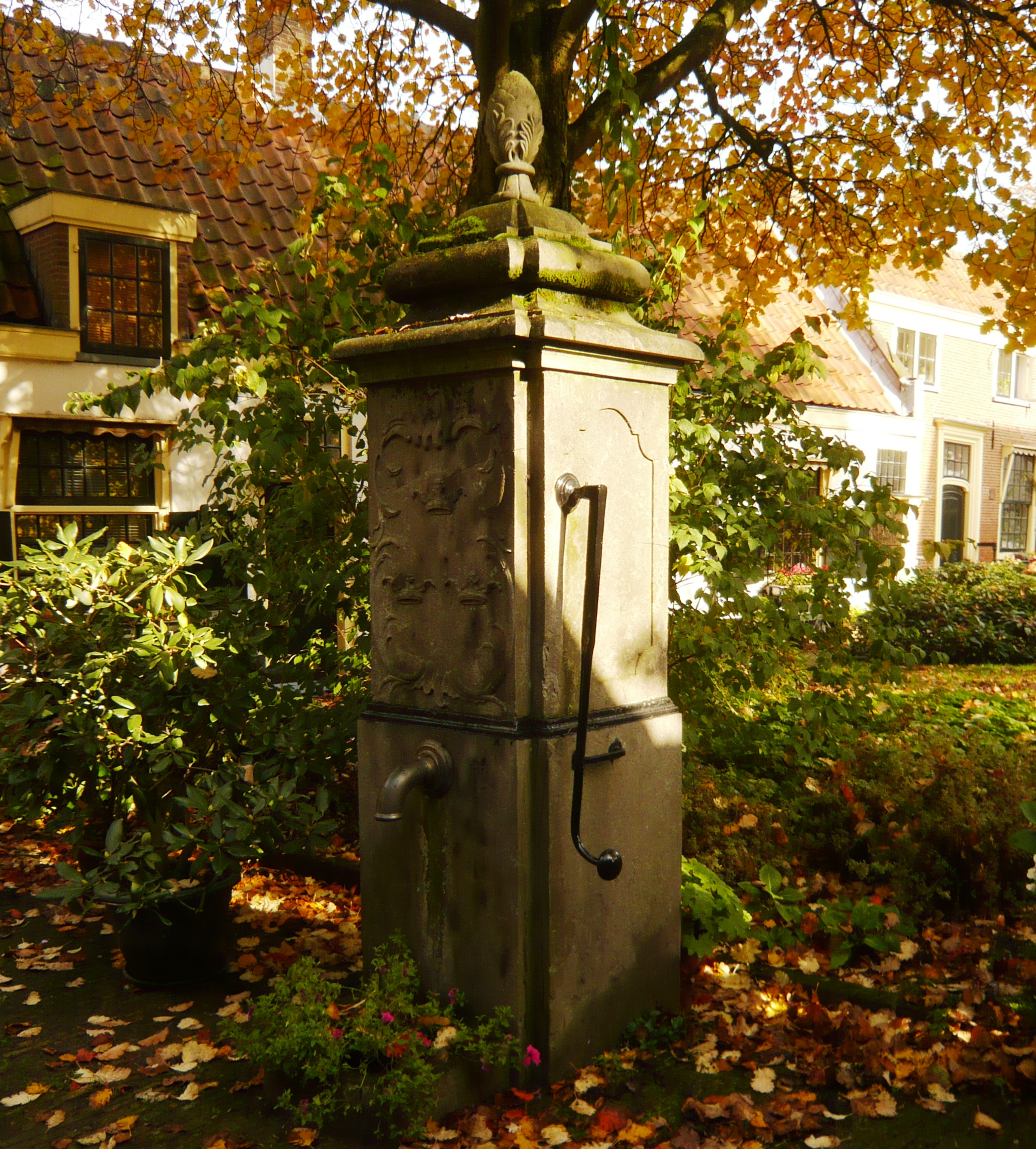
Pump in the garden of Hofje van Loo that is decorated with a Baroque heraldic shield showing the 3 crowns.

The building is named after the society that ran the hospital, the St. Elisabeth Gasthuis, which is named after Elisabeth of Hungary. The society's original building, the Gangolf Gasthuis, was lost during the fire of 1572 and that land is now the location of the Vroom & Dreesmann building (in which HEMA has an outlet store today- on the Verwulft. In 1581 the hospital petitioned the town for permission to build a new hospital while also filing for damages from the fire. They were awarded this location and the remaining monks in the monastery were forced to leave. On a map by Thomas Thomasz from 1578, both the burned Verwulft and the monastery complex can be seen clearly. Parts of the original complex are preserved, including the old regent rooms inside, though the furnishings and paintings have been transferred to the Frans Hals Museum.

Though 1581 is the official establishment date, the St. Elisabeth Gasthuis was already well established in 1489, when the Hofje van Loo was formed. The earliest mention in the Utrecht archives of the hospital is from 1406, when Walterus Dullaert made a payment to the Utrecht Arch-diocese for serving the altar to Saint Elisabeth in the Haarlem Gasthuis.

In 1683 the books were merged with the Hofje van Loo, a hofje that was associated with the Gangolf hospital in the old location. That hofje still exists today, though it is no longer actively administered by the hospital, which formed the "Elisabeth van Thüringen Fonds" in 1975 to administer its rich archives and artifacts.

== Art collection ==
Since 1975, the "Elisabeth van Thüringen Fonds" appointed a curator to take care of its imposing art collection, which was the result of centuries of commissions to local artists. In general, the art commissioned was meant to either glorify the purpose of the institution itself, or to commemorate the regents of the Gasthuis, generally at moments of change, such as new appointments or retirement. On 15 April 2012 a large selection of 11 works were formally signed over to the Frans Hals Museum, which already had 14 items on loan. These include the group portraits of former regents by Frans Hals, Jan Cornelisz Verspronck and Frans Decker, as well as pieces by Maarten van Heemskerck, Dirck Hals, Cornelis Cornelisz van Haarlem, Nicolaas Roosendael, Adriaan Backer, and a follower of Joachim Patenier.

=== Group portraits of the regents and regentesses ===
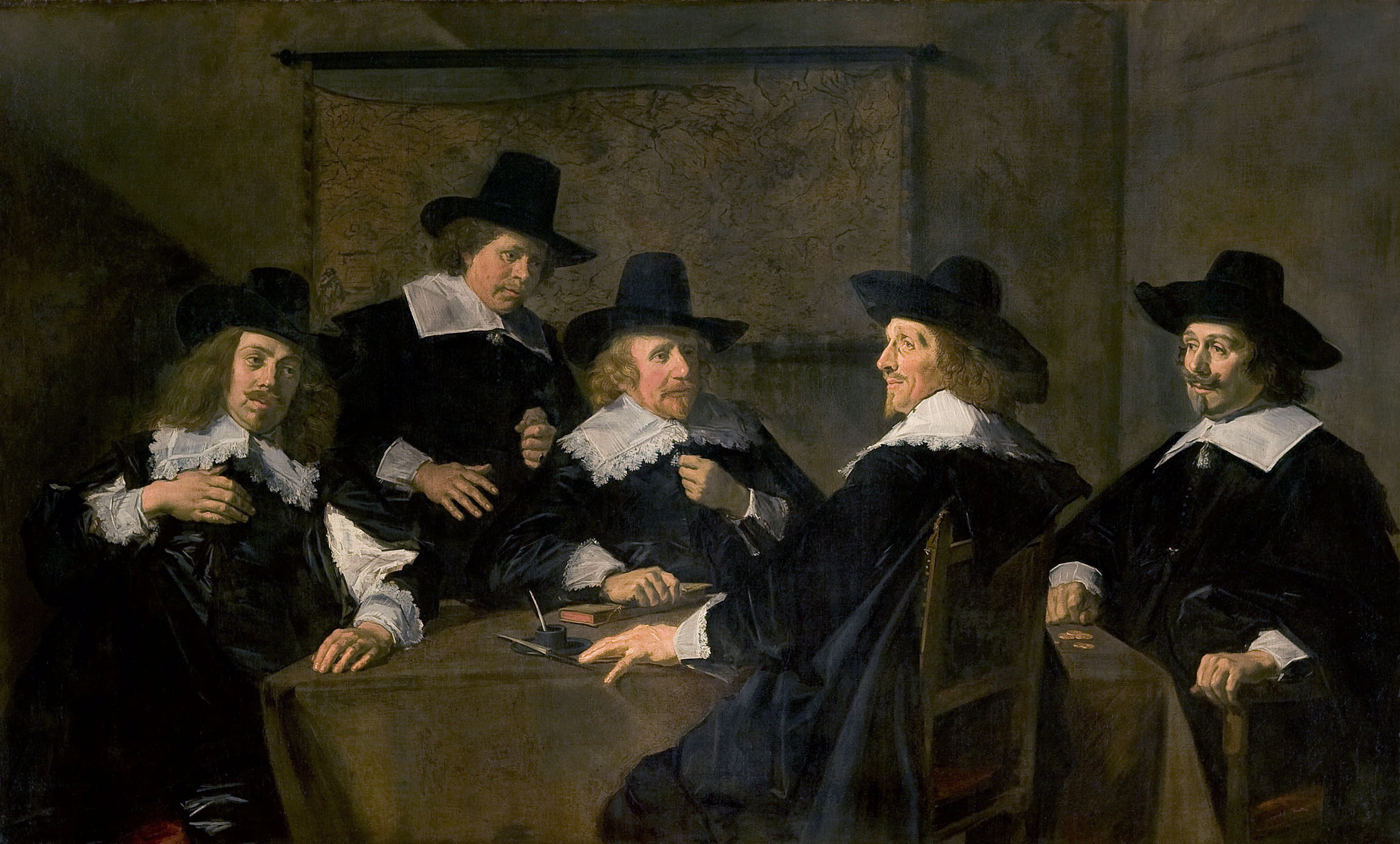
Regents Francois Woutersz, Dirk Dirks Del, Johan van Clarenbeek, Salomon Cousaert, and Sivert Sem Warmond, painted by Frans Hals in 1641

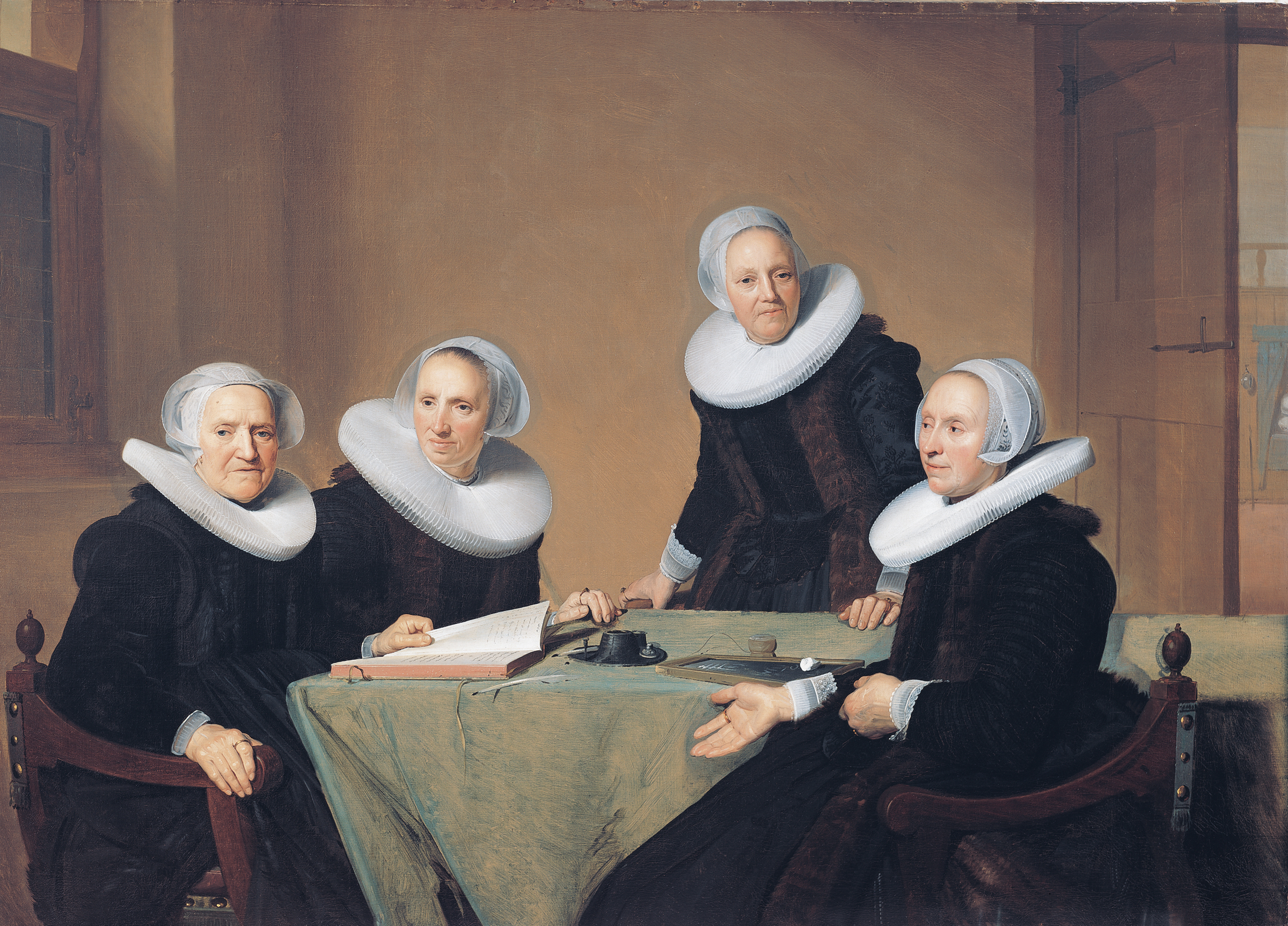
Regentesses Guertge Laurensdr, Beatrix Schatter, Belijtgen van Schilperoort, and Elisabeth van Teffelen, painted by Johannes Cornelisz Verspronck in 1641

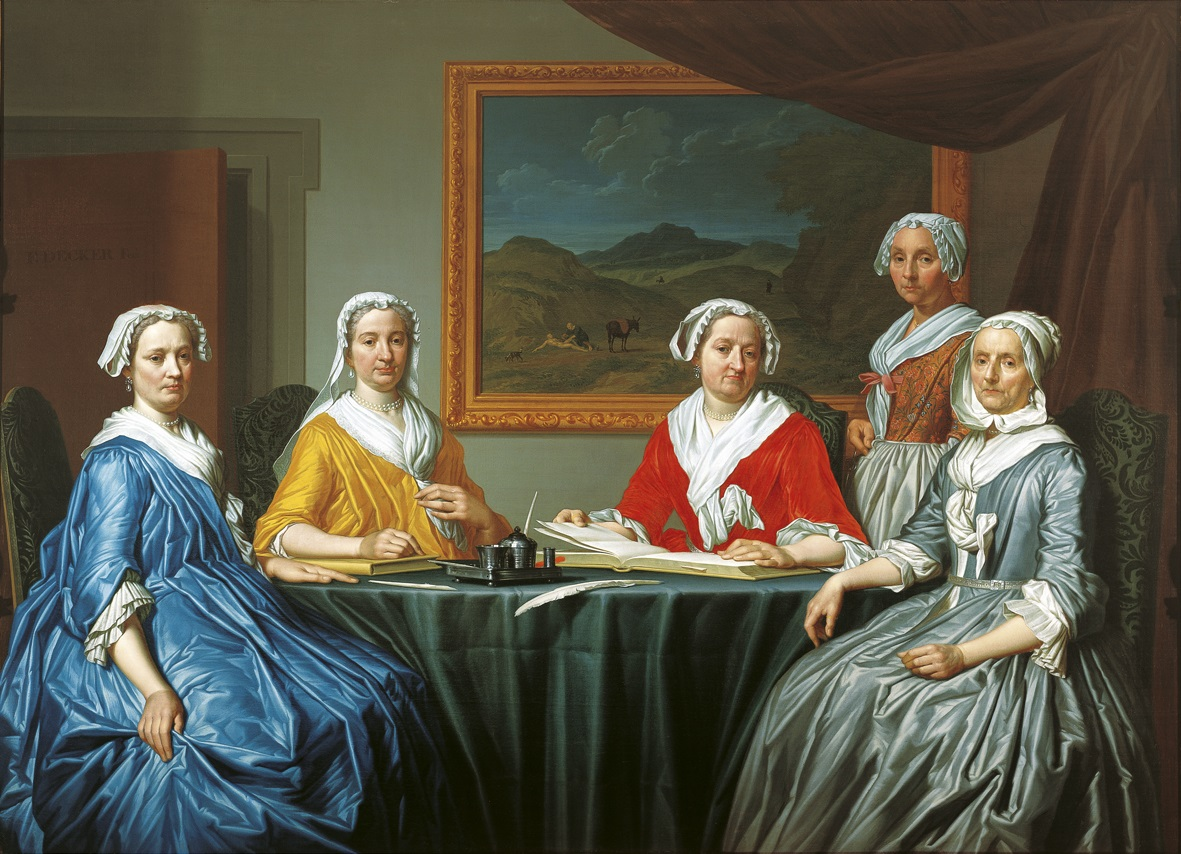
Regentesses by Frans Decker, 1740

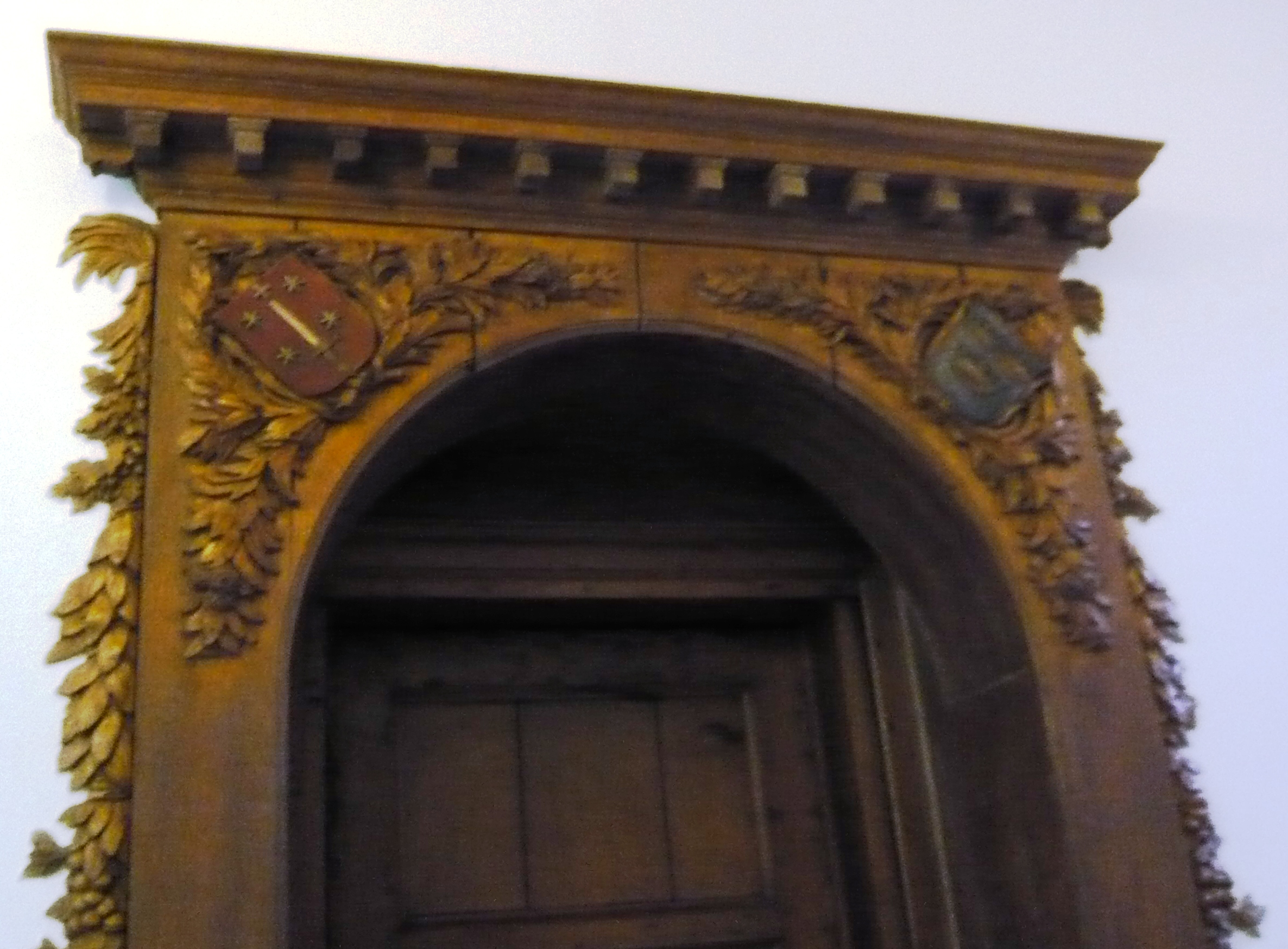
Doorway into Regentesses room inside the St. Elisabeth Gasthuis. On the left the Haarlem city coat of arms and on the right the St. Elisabeth of Thuringen coat of arms (3 crowns). Inside, the Frans Hals painting of the Regentesses used to be installed on the wall, but today is around the corner in the Frans Hals Museum.

=== Other paintings ===
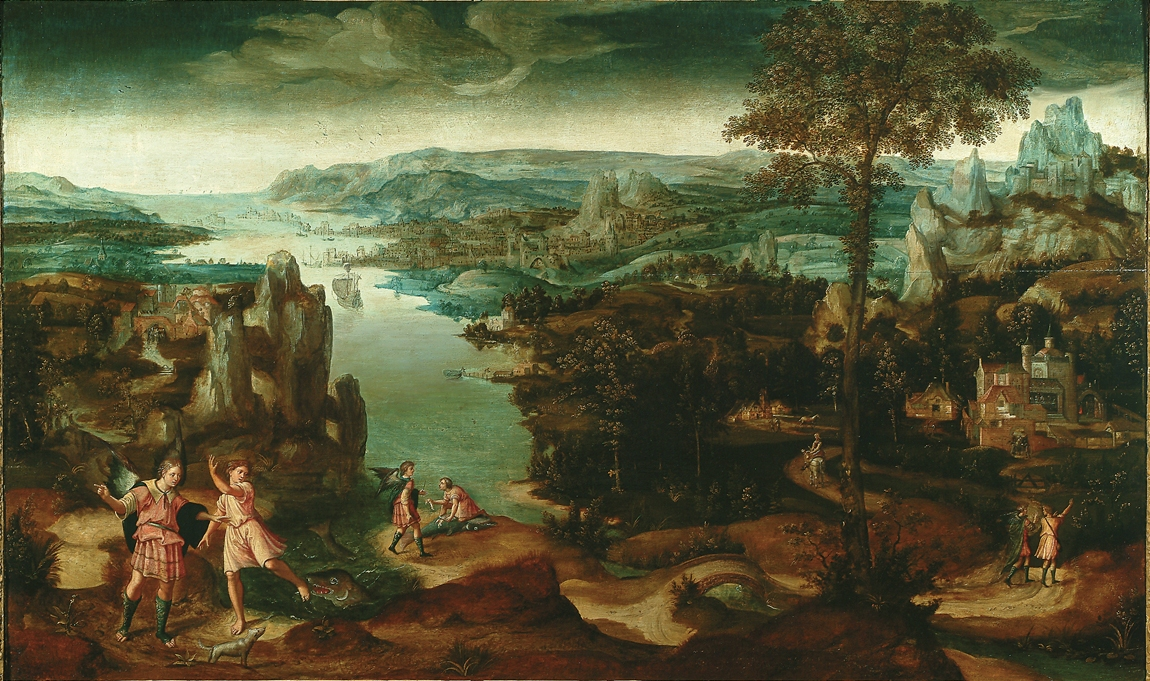
Story of the Book of Tobit by a follower of Joachim Patinier, c. 1550-1599

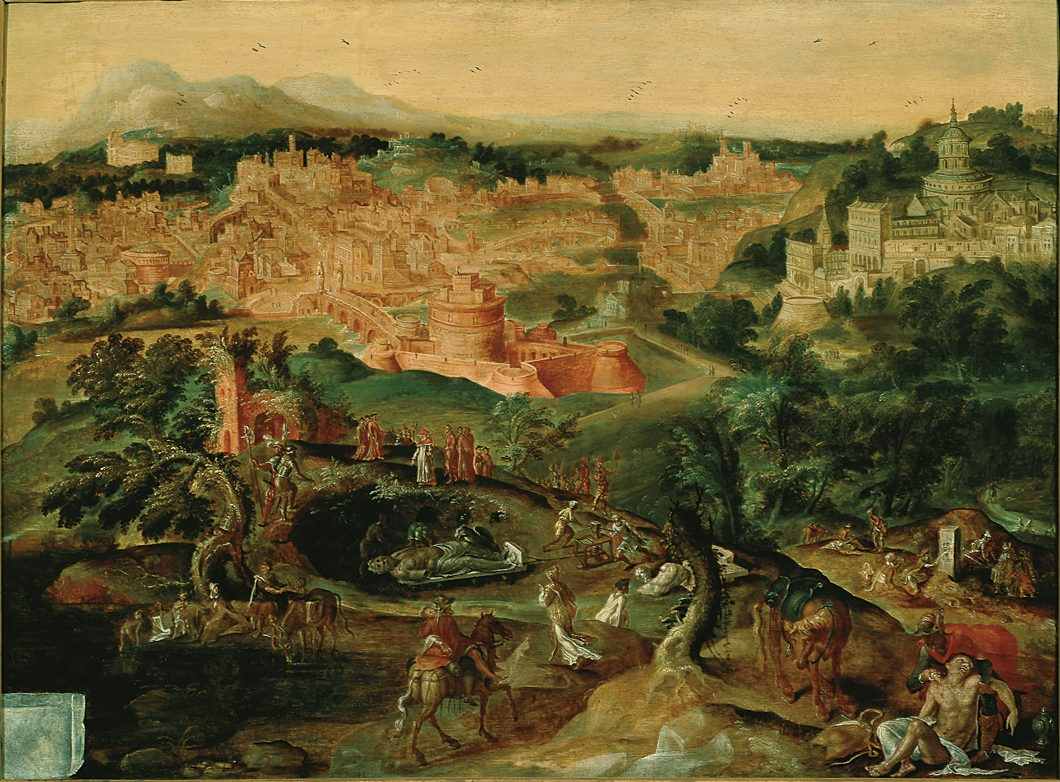
The Good Samaritan by Maarten van Heemskerck, c.1550

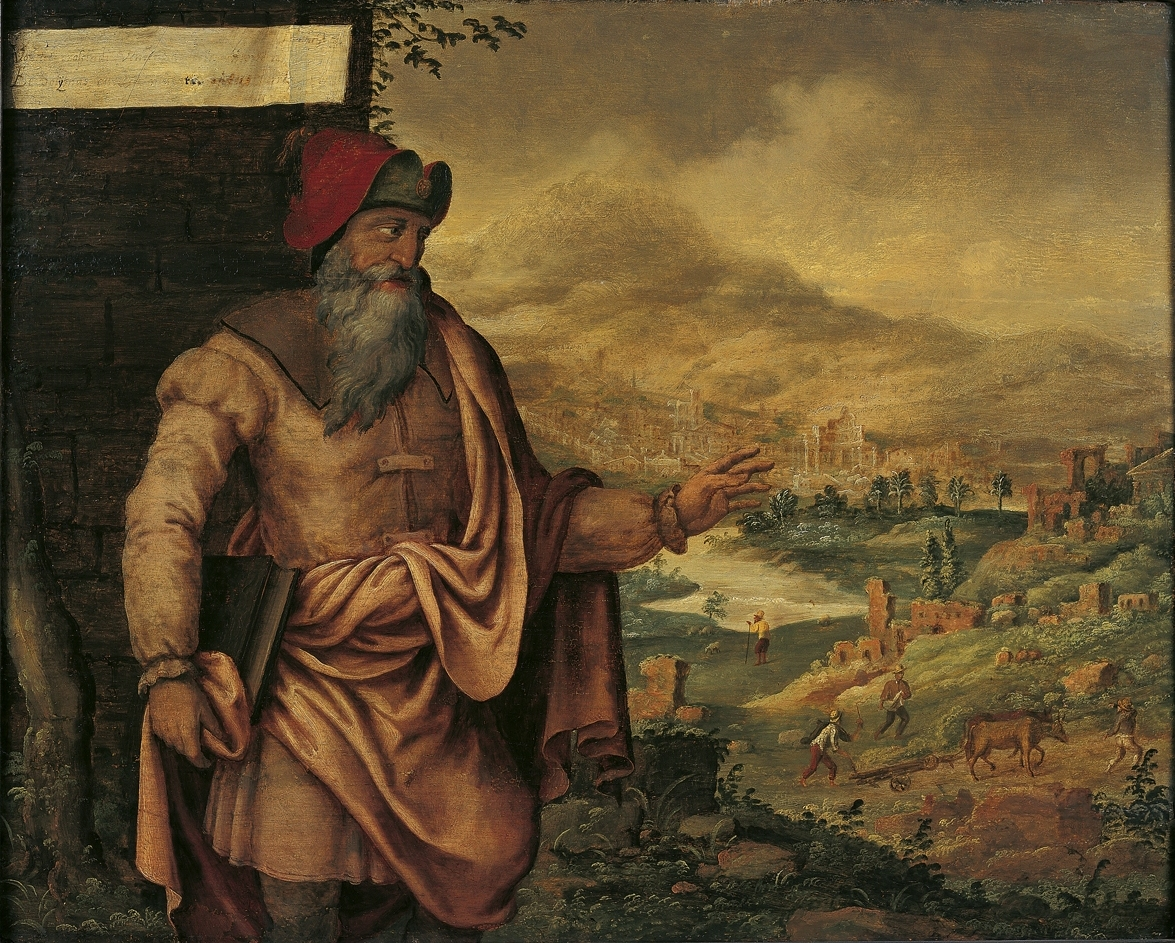
Prophet Isaiah predicts the return of the Jews from exile, by Maarten van Heemskerck, 1560-1565

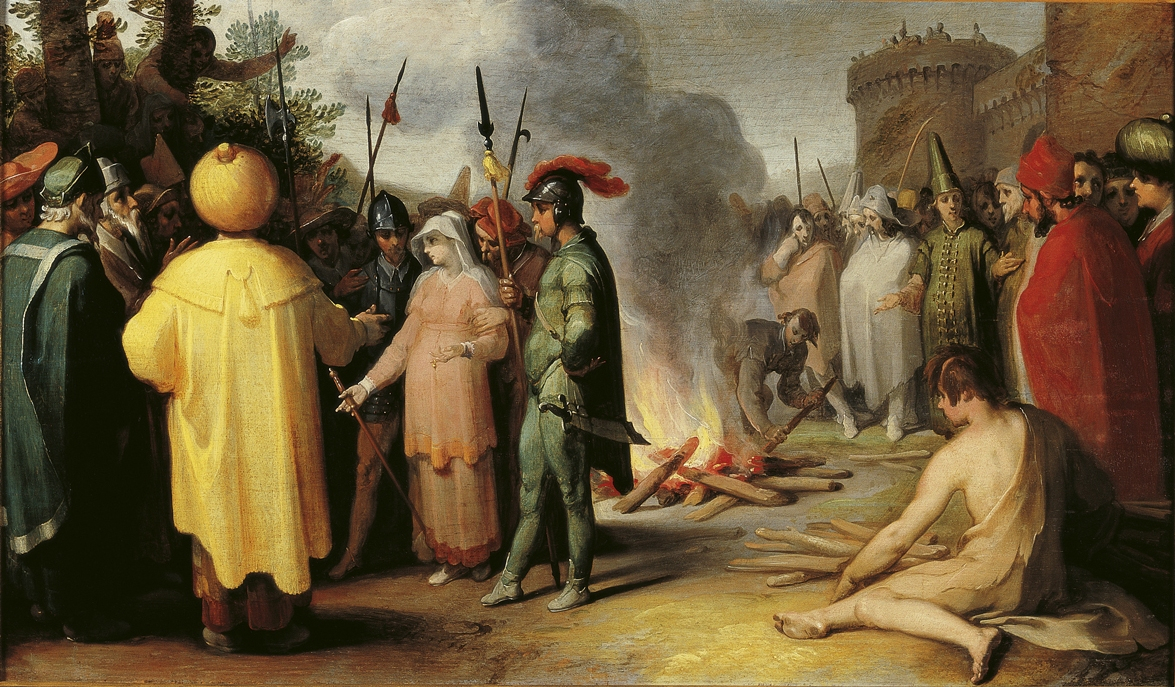
Judah and Tamar, by Cornelis Cornelisz van Haarlem, 1596

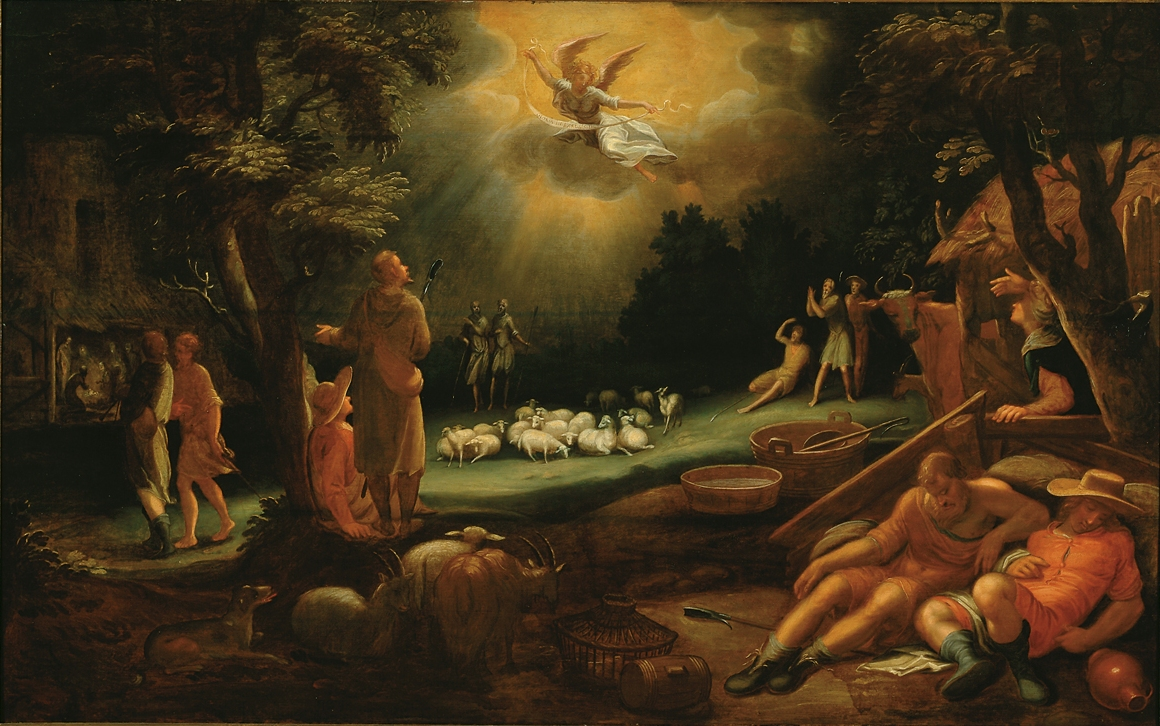
Annunciation to the shepherds, in the manner of Abraham Bloemaert, c.1600

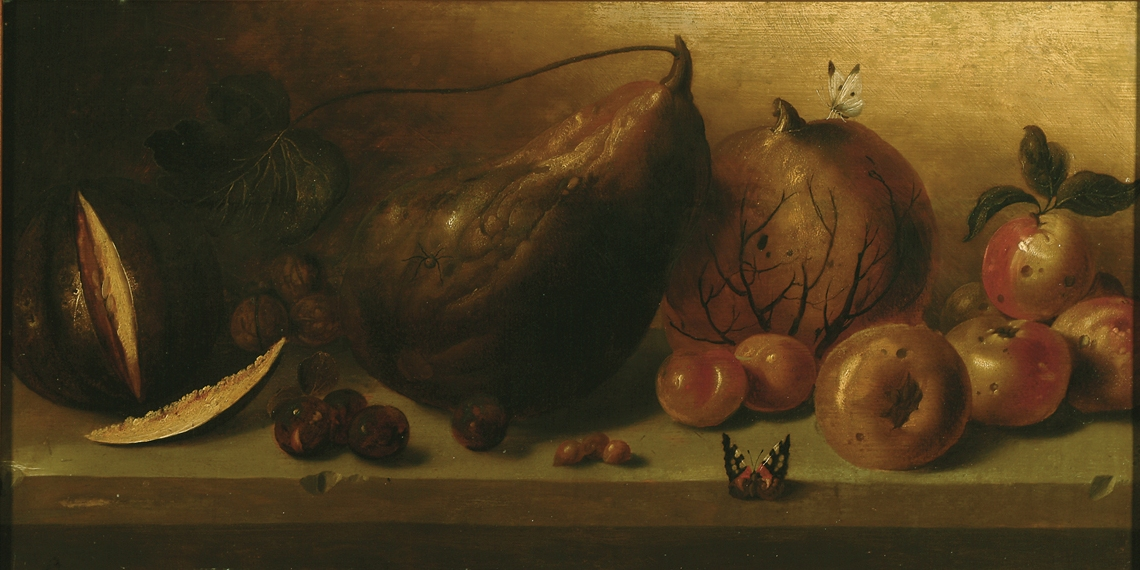
Still life with fruit and butterflies, by Claes van Heussen, 1610-1633

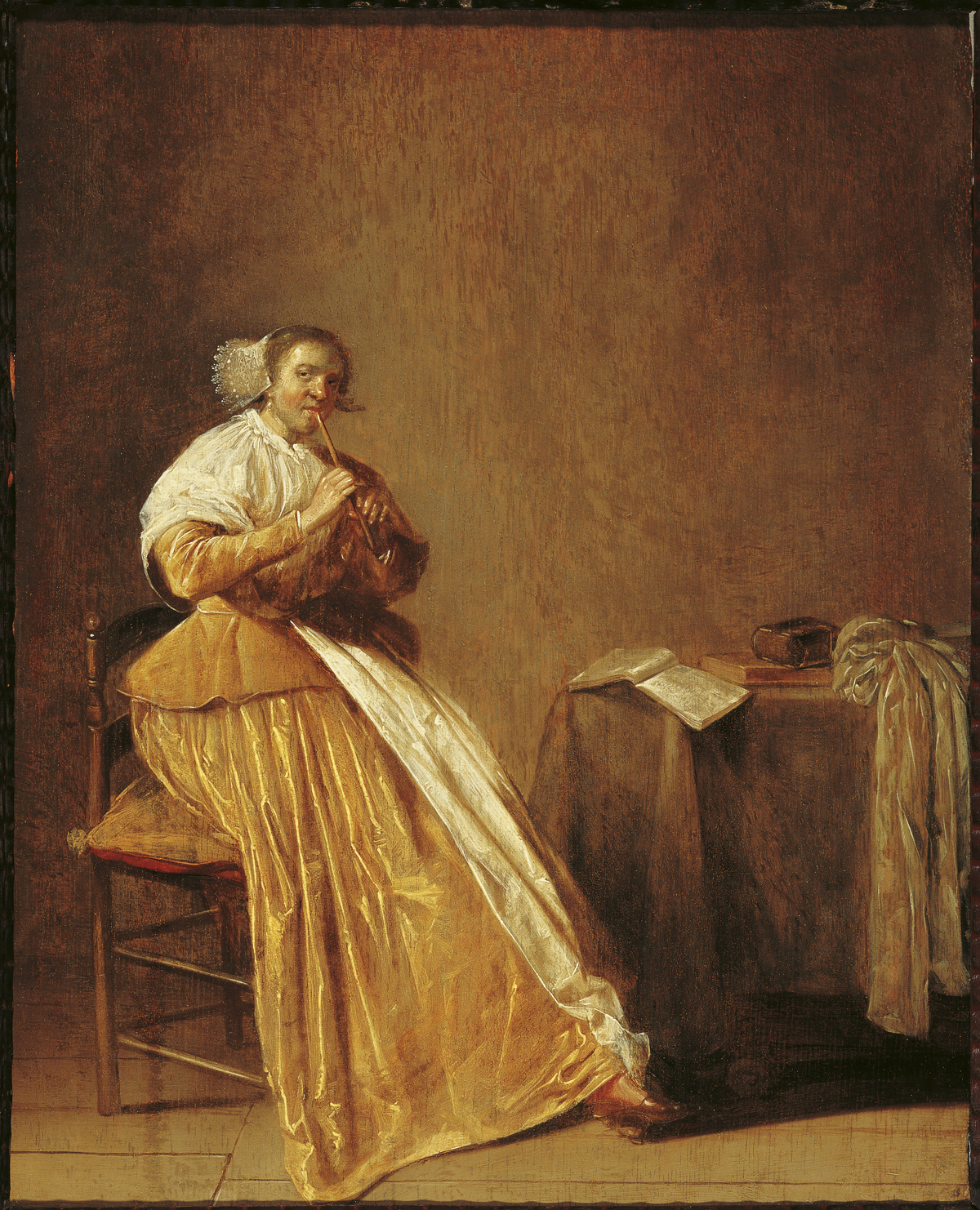
Woman playing a flute by Dirck Hals, 1630

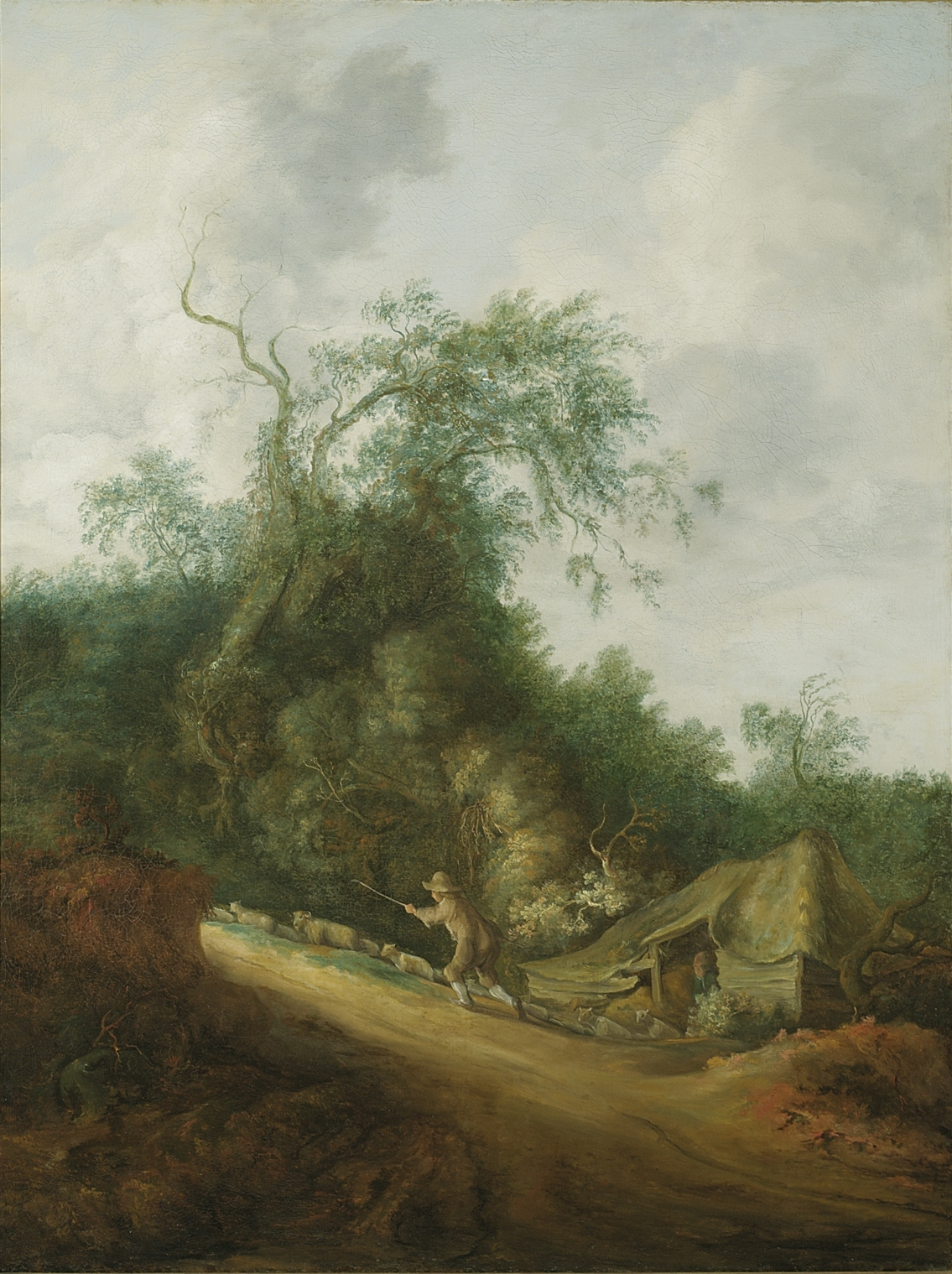
Dune landscape with shepherd and drove of sheep, by Cornelis Symonsz van der Schalcke, 1645

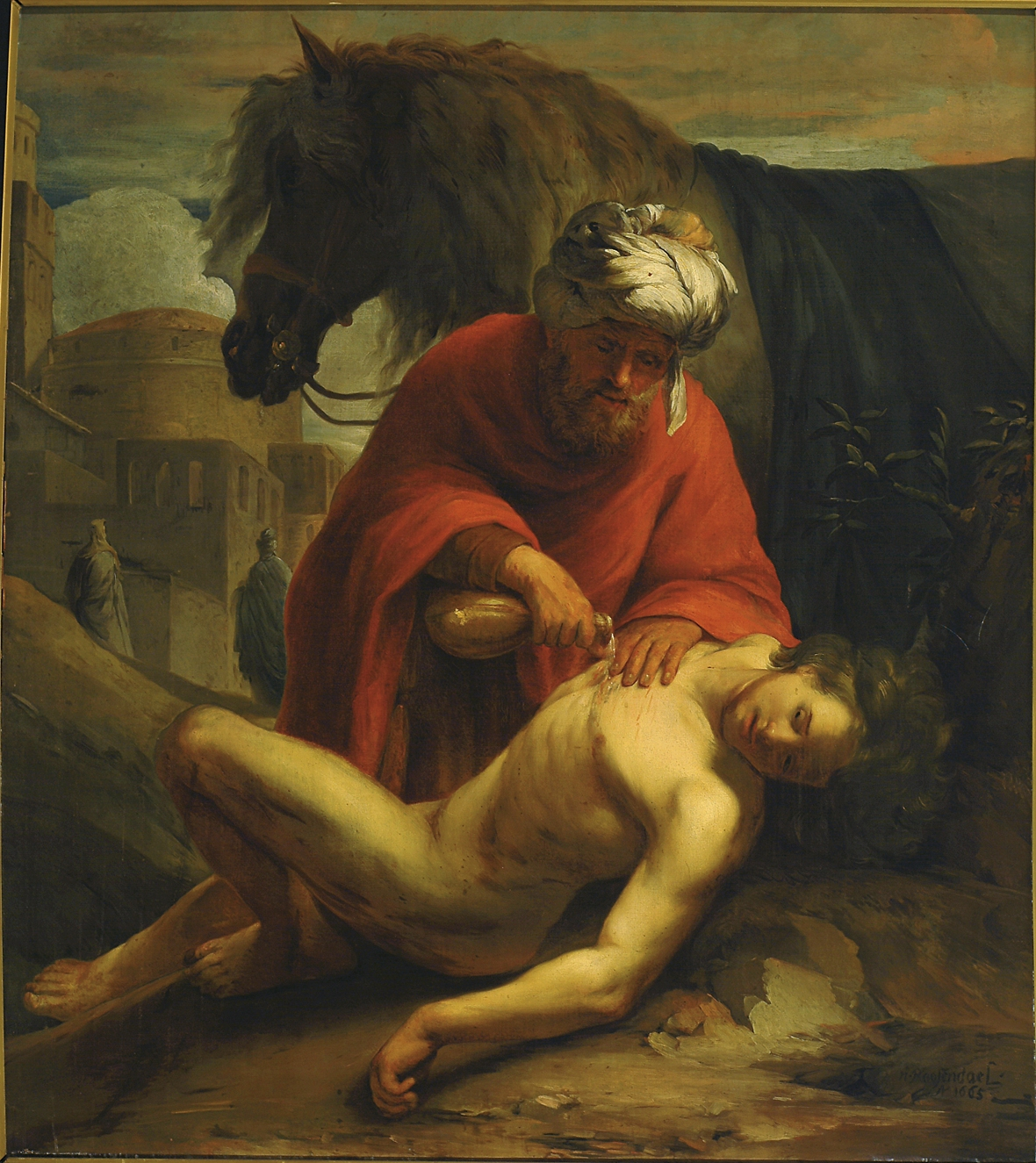
The good Samaritan by Nicolaas Roosendael, 1665

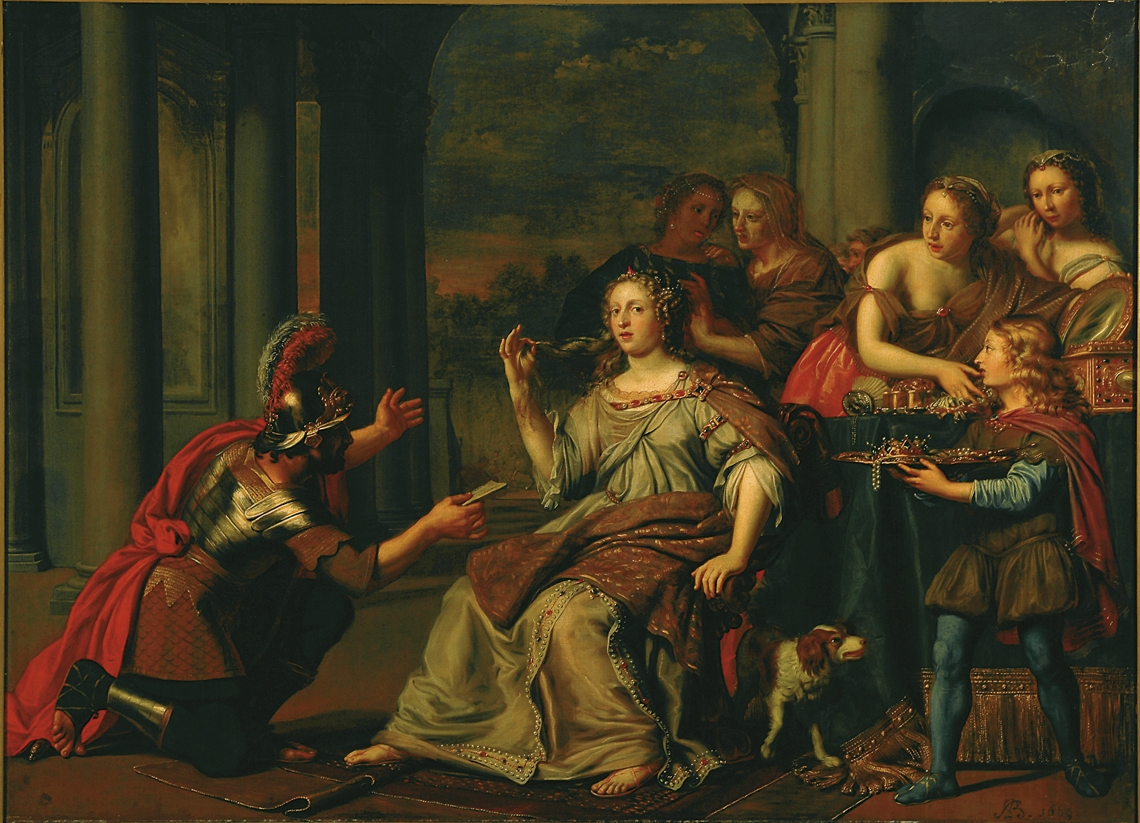
Semiramis receives word of the uprising in Babylon, by Adriaen Backer, 1669

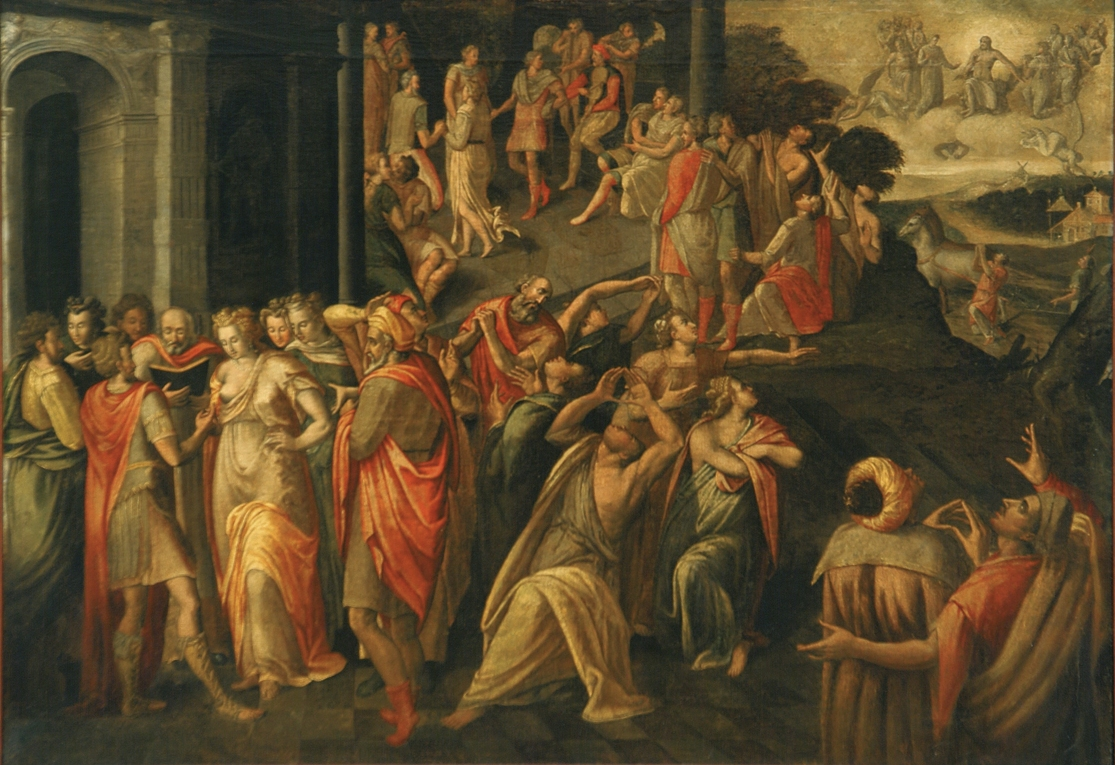
The Last Judgement, by an unknown artist in the 19th century

Some felt that the paintings should have been sold on the open market for hospital funding, rather than given to the Frans Hals Museum, but as the former curator Alexander de Bruin pointed out, the top regent group portraits had not been paid for by the institution but were funded privately by the regents themselves, or paid for by the city council. This was true of any art commissioned to decorate their hospital or the regent's offices, a practise which has continued into the present day, as the modern-day hospital Kennemer Gasthuis has commissioned works under the national "1% rule", referring to the spending of 1% of new building costs on art for decoration of public buildings (such as the new hospital premises). Art formerly purchased and in the possession of the fund are considered city cultural heritage and the property of the city of Haarlem. Art currently installed or purchased under this rule is formally also considered the property of the city of Haarlem.

== Heraldic shield ==
The heraldic shield of the St. Elisabeth Gasthuis is three crowns, symbolizing the three kingdoms of St. Elizabeth; Hungary, Bohemia, and Thüringen. This was the hospital logo until the name changed. In Haarlem, the old logo can still be found in many places.

heraldic shield

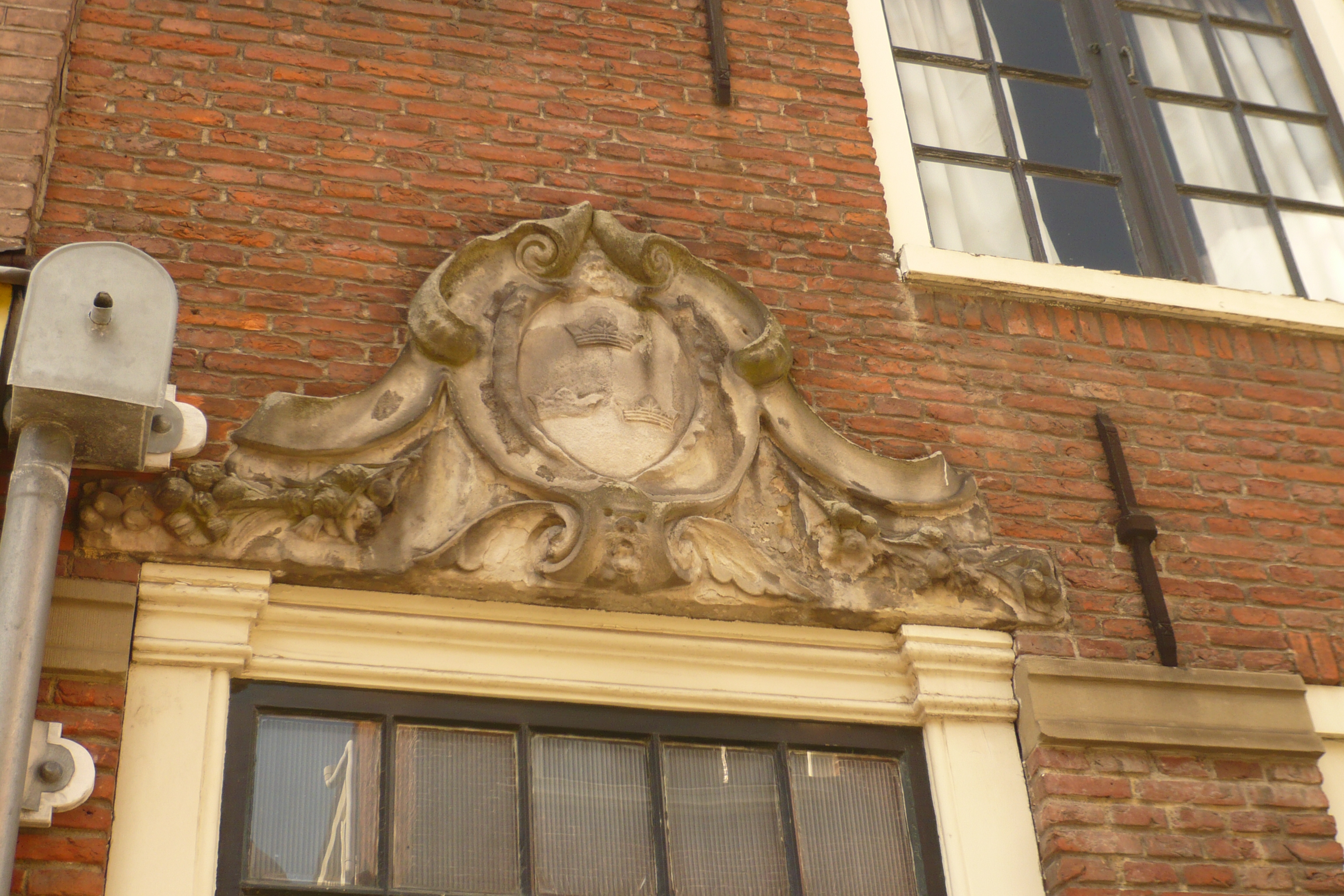
Kleine Houtstraat

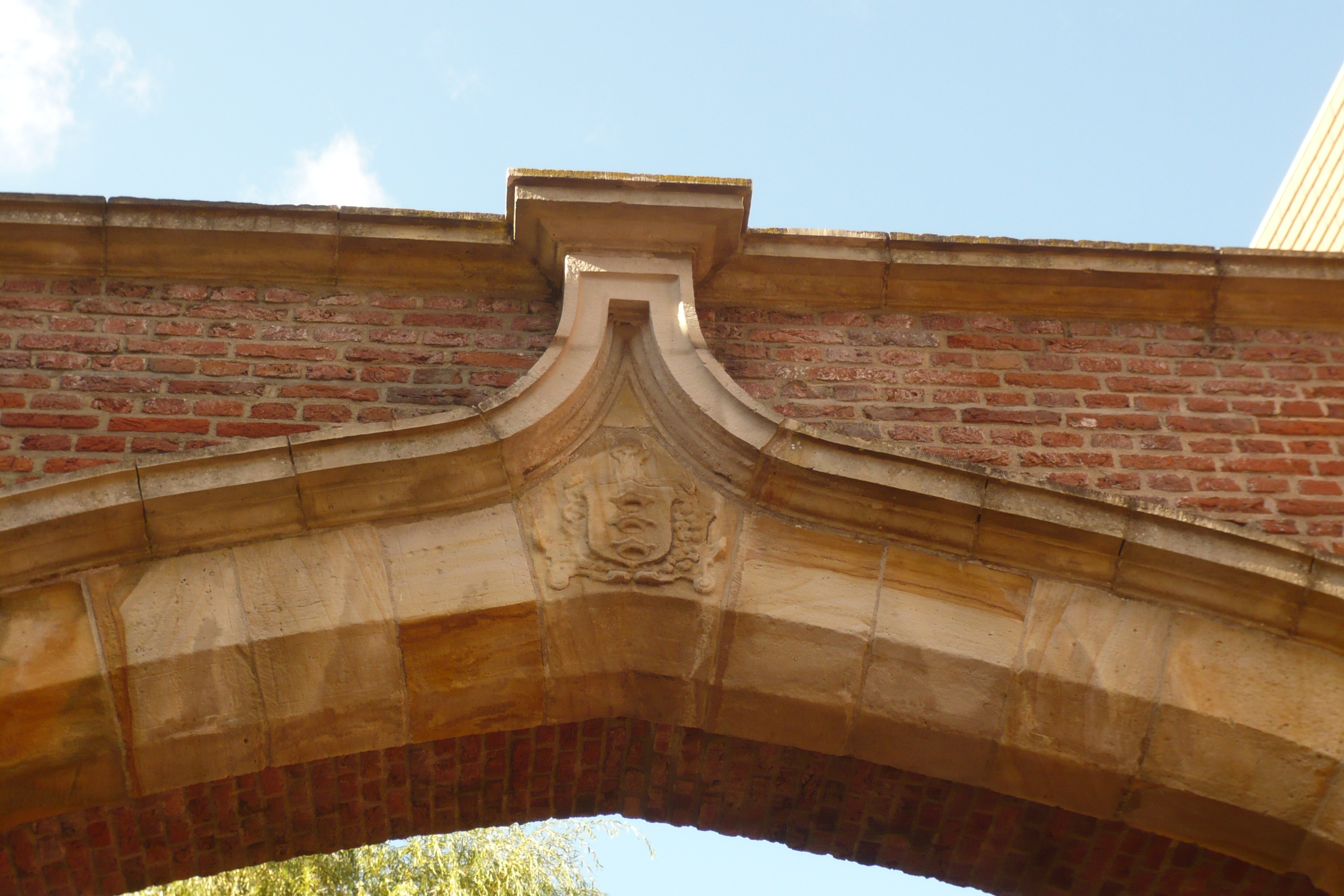
Gasthuispoort, Kleine Houtstraat

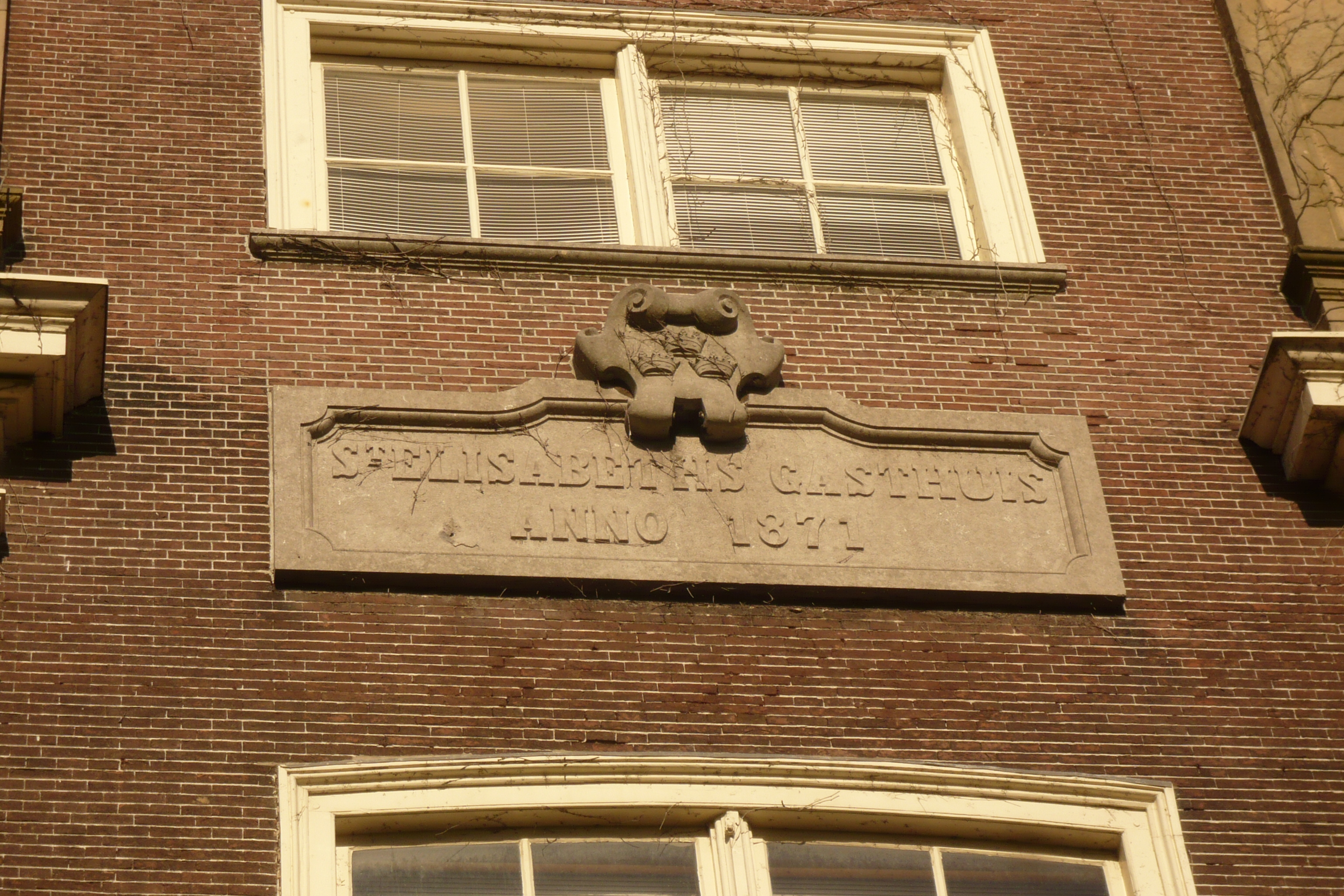
Gasthuisvest

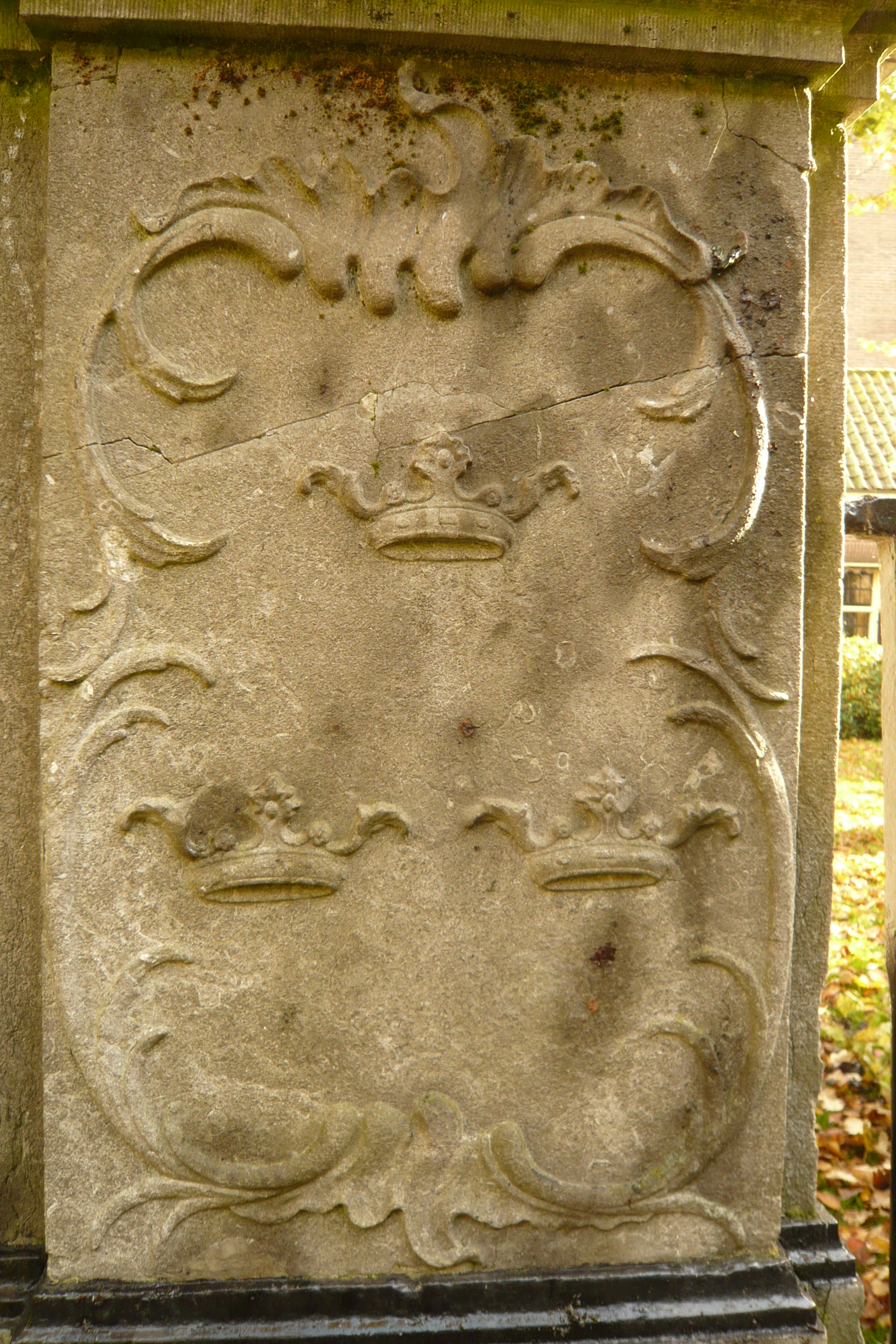
Hofje van Loo

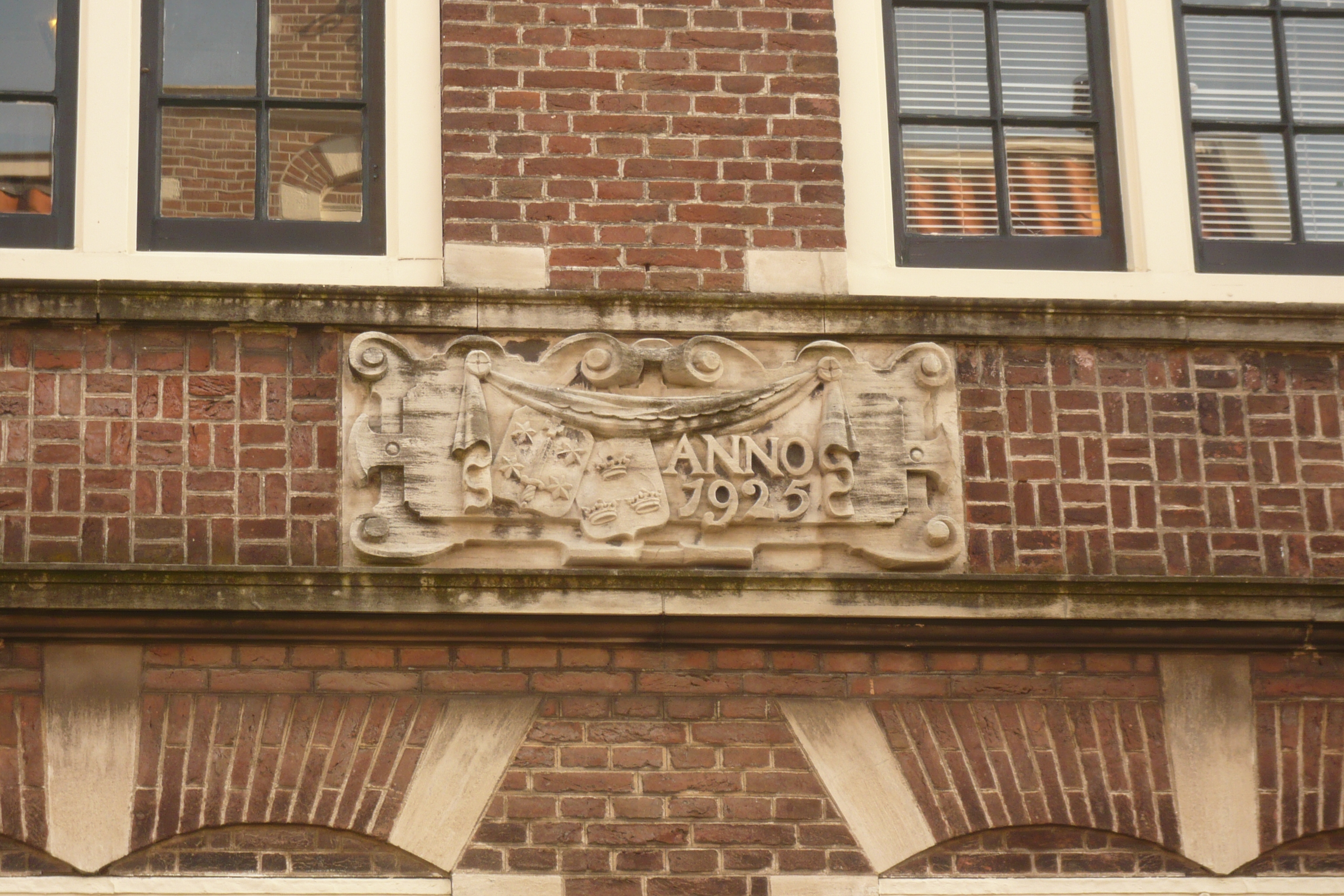
Groot Heiligland

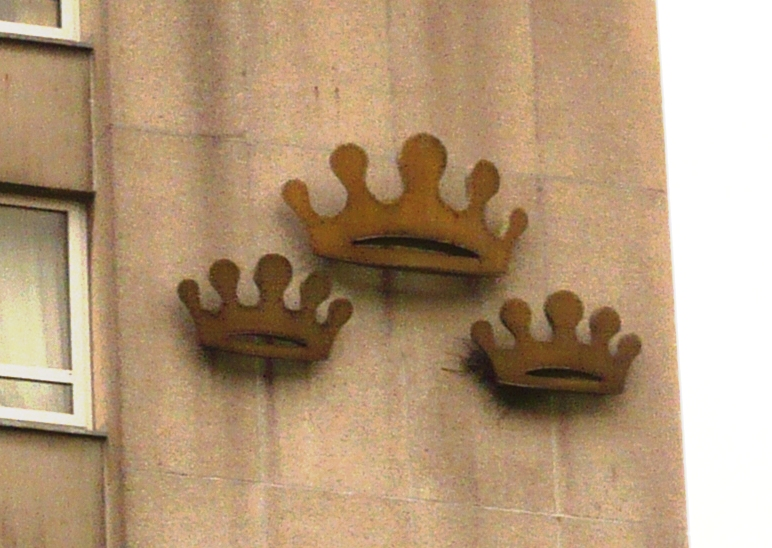
Boerhaavelaan, Haarlem

== Spaarne Gasthuis ==
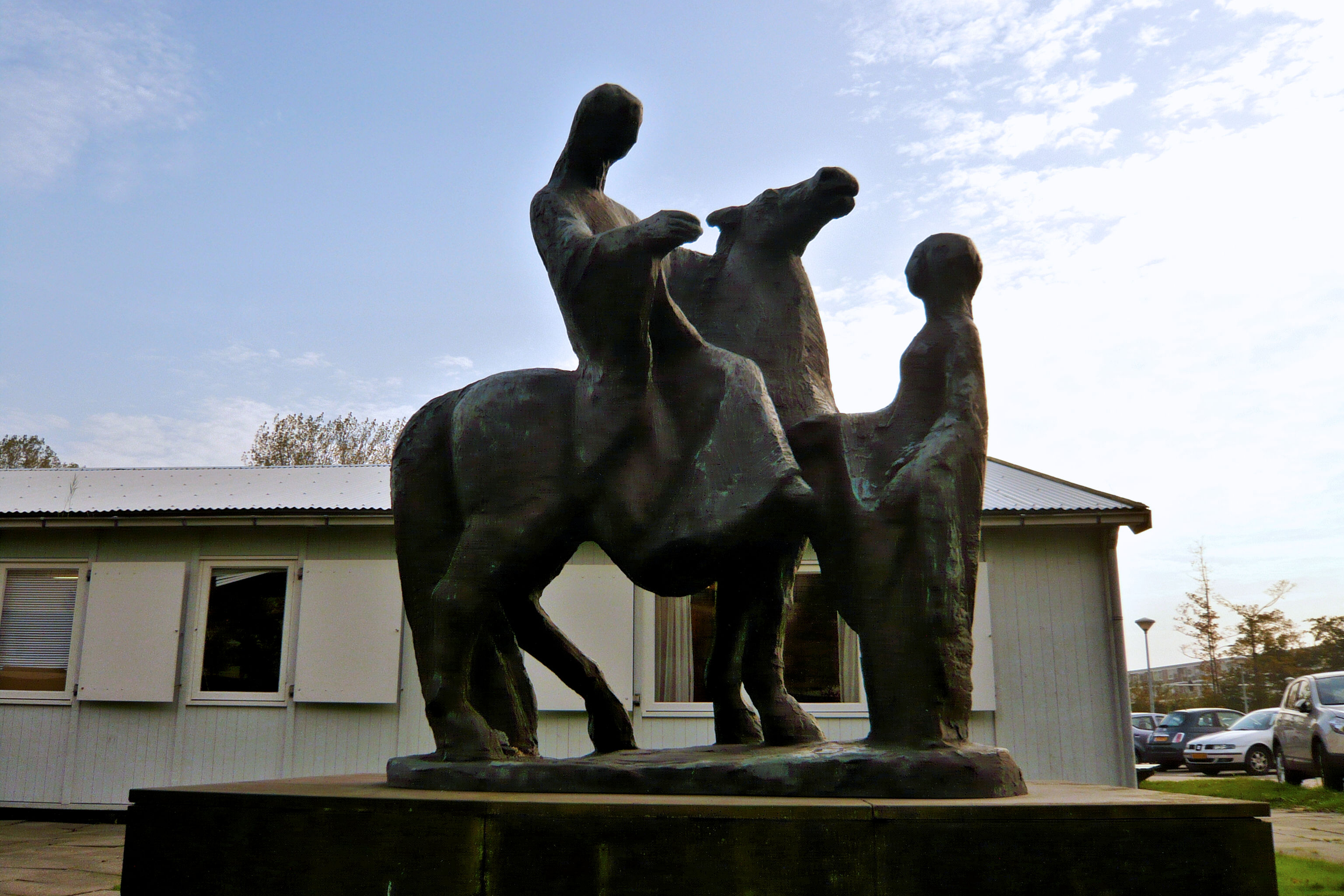
This statue of Elisabeth van Thuringen by Mari Andriessen showing the roses to her husband Ludwig (known as the miracle of the roses) was originally the centerpiece of a rose garden located behind the new hospital in the 1970s.

In 1970 the old location in Haarlem was abandoned for a new location on the southeastern edge of the city at Boerhaavelaan 22 in Schalkwijk. In 1991 the EG hospital merged with the St. Joannes de Deo (formerly located north of the Haarlem Railway Station) and the Zeeweg Ziekenhuis (formerly of IJmuiden). After the merger the old locations were closed or sold and a new large complex was built on the northern edge of Haarlem at Vondelweg 999. The Boerhaavelaan location is now known as "Kennemer Gasthuis locatie Zuid".

== Modern use of the complex ==
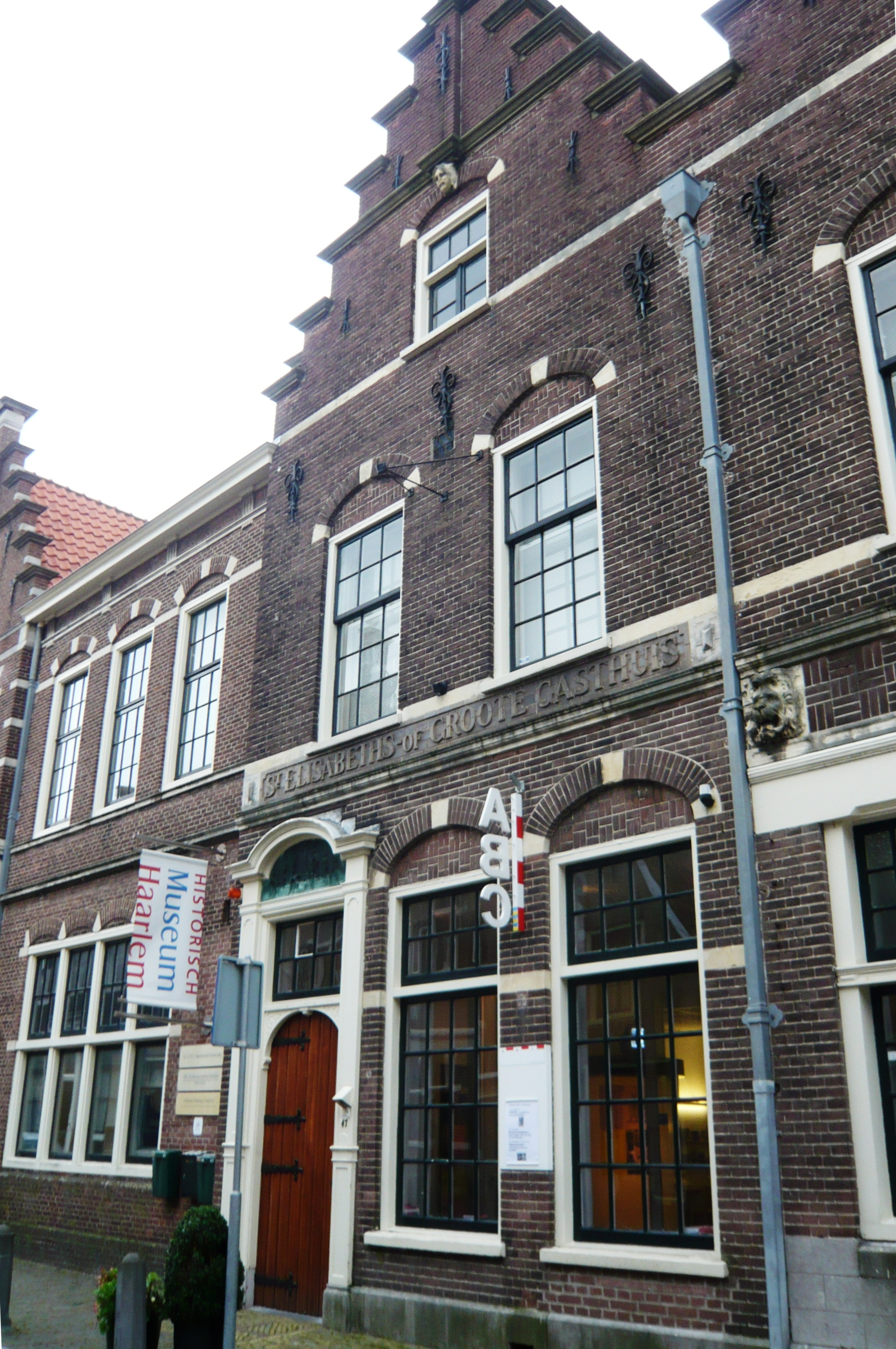
Former entrance to the polyclinic on the Groot Heiligland is now the entrance to two museums.

Today the former main building on the Gasthuisvest serves as a local cultural center for music, dancing and fitness lessons. The former wings have been mostly converted to apartments, though two museums reside in the early 19th century wing on the Groot Heiligland, the Historisch Museum Haarlem and the ABC Architectuurcentrum Haarlem.

An overview of Haarlem history is now on display in the room that once housed the "Zanderzaal", a room of physical therapy equipment named after the inventor of physical therapy, Gustav Zander.
