= Johan Adrianus Gerard van der Steur =

Prof. ir. Johan Adrianus Gerard van der Steur
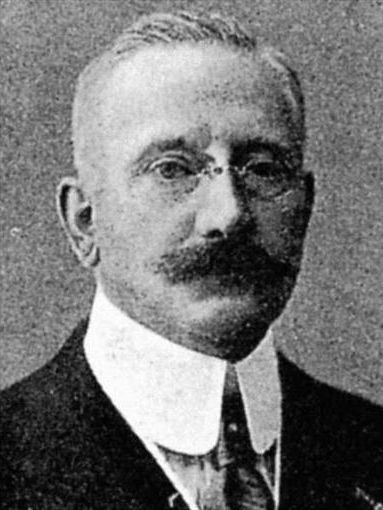
- Born: 30 October 1865; Haarlem
- Died: 7 February 1945 (aged 79); Steenwijk
- Occupation: Architect

Academic background
- Education: Delft University of Technology

Academic work
- Discipline: Architecture

Johan Adrianus Gerard (J.A.G.) van der Steur (30 October 1865 – 7 February 1945) was a Dutch architect and professor at the Delft Technical University, of which he was rector magnificus in the year 1922–1923.

== Life and work ==
Van der Steur was born in Haarlem where his father, Ad van der Steur, worked as an architect. Between 1983 and 1988 he studied architectural engineering at the Polytechnic School of Delft, where he was also taught by Eugen Gugel.

After graduating he travelled Europe and, after returning to Haarlem, he started working at his father's office. From 1907 to 1913 he was the architect in charge of reviewing and realising Louis M. Cordonnier's design for the Peace Palace in The Hague. Van der Steur also designed the Municipal Theatre of Haarlem, a building for the Faculty of Architecture in Delft, Pander & Son's factories in The Hague and a building for De Nederlandsche Bank in Leiden.

In 1914 he was hired by the Delft Technical University as a substitute professor for Henri Evers. In 1917 he became a regular professor. From 1916 to 1924 he was the head of the board of directors of the Royal Academy of Art, The Hague. From 1922 to 1923 he was director of the Delft Technical University.
