= Hofjes in Haarlem =

Almshouses in Haarlem

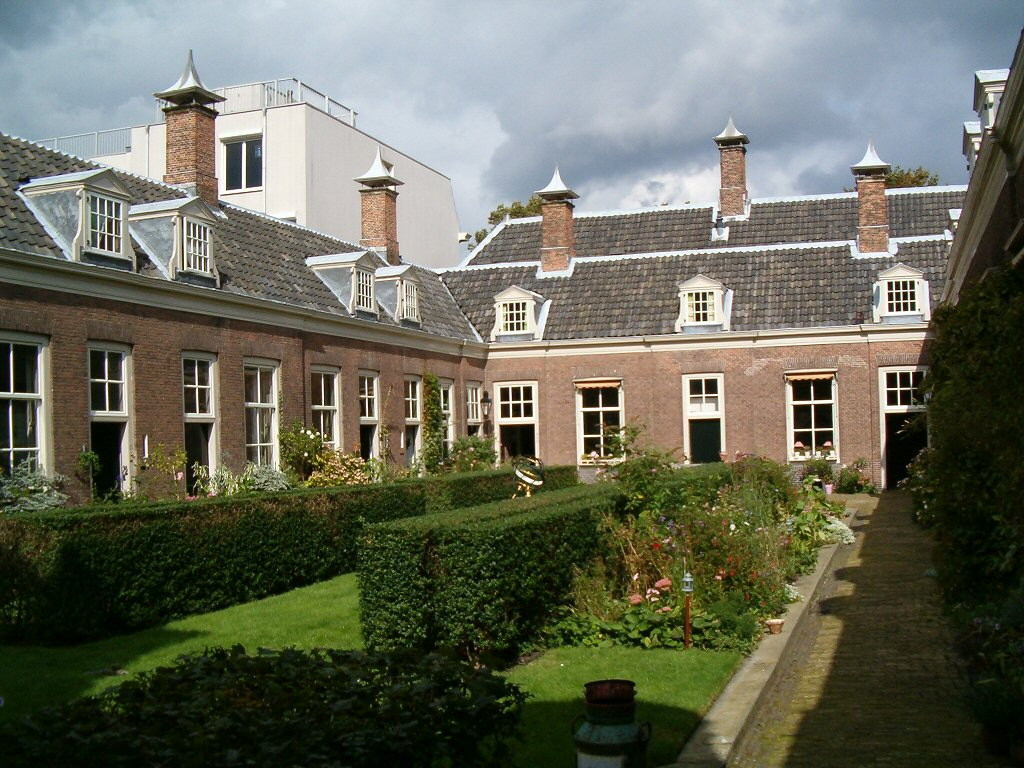
The Hofje van Noblet is one of the hofjes in Haarlem that is still in use the way the original founders wanted it in 1760.

Haarlem is one of the cities in the Netherlands that has a number of hofjes. Some of them are still in use with boards of regents. Many of these are members of the Stichting Haarlemse Hofjes (Foundation Hofjes of Haarlem). The word 'hofje' just means small garden, because the hofjes are generally small houses grouped around a community kitchen garden with a water pump. Often they were attached to a larger field for bleaching linen or growing orchards, but today those fields have been long used for city expansion and only the central gardens can still be seen.

== Early hospitals ==
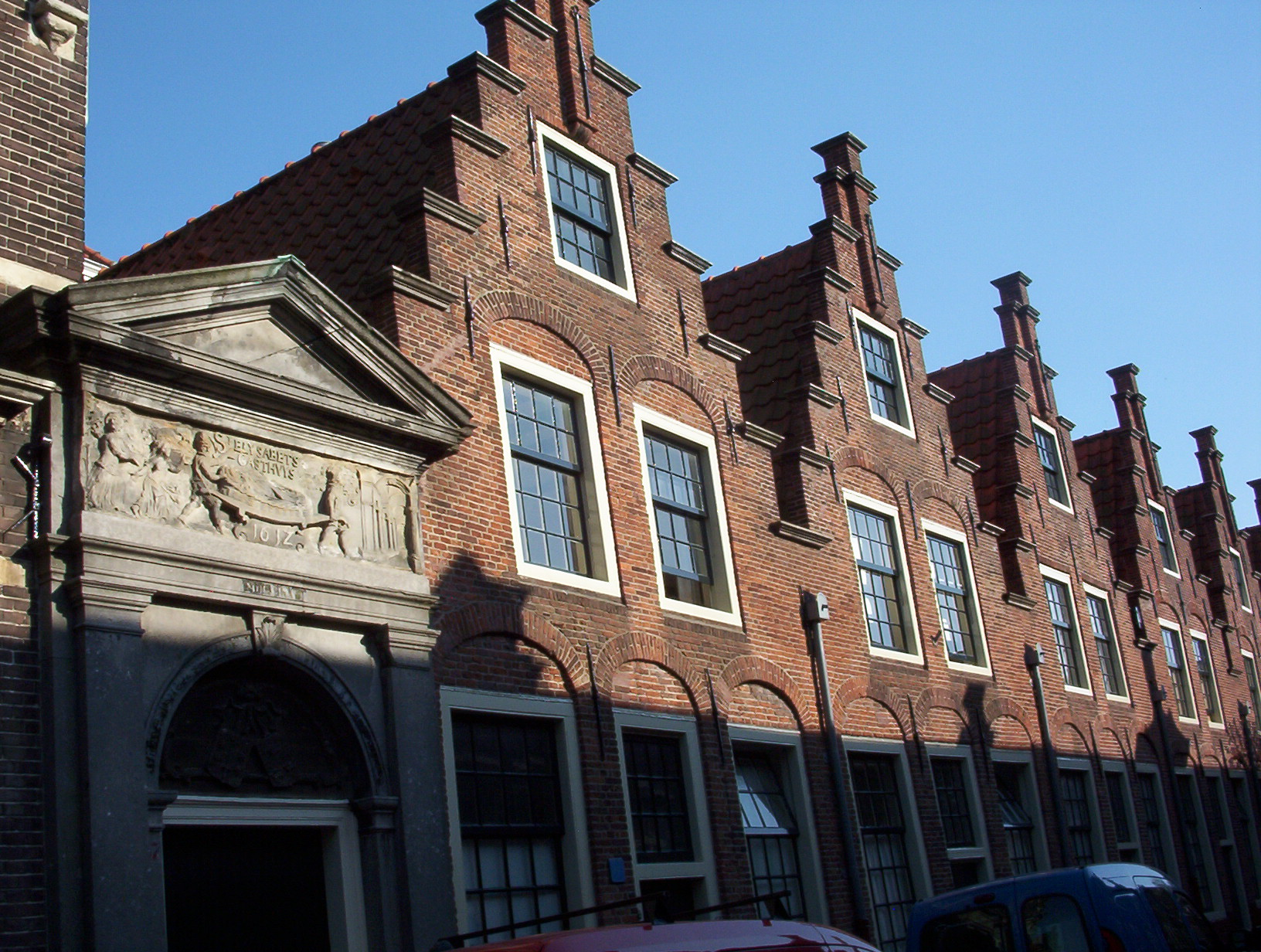
The St. Elisabeth's Gasthuys was the first city hospital of Haarlem and associated with the Hofje van Loo. This doorway was used as an entrance from 1581 to the 20th century.

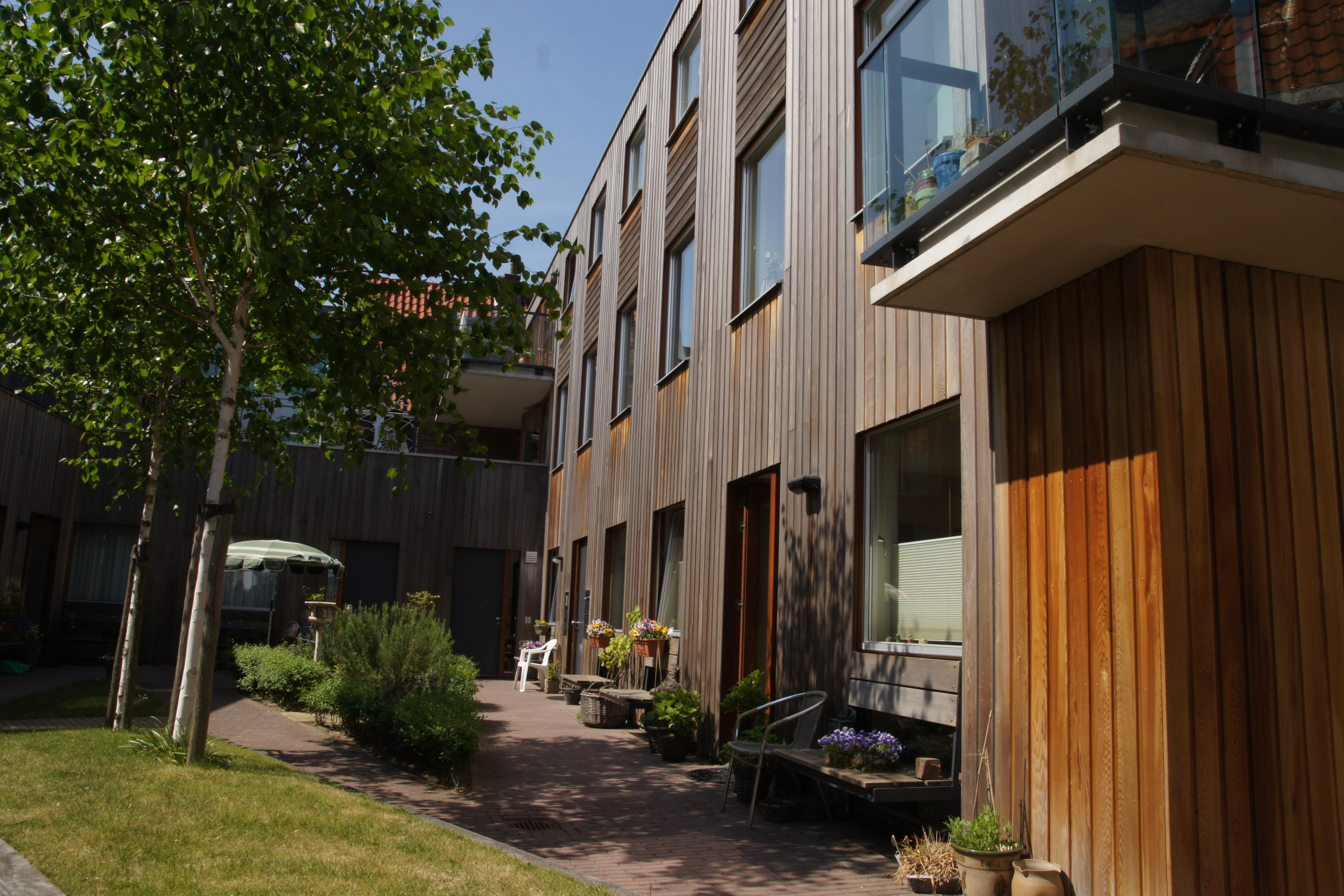
Central courtyard and main building of Johan Enschedé Hof

What we would call 'social work' today was called charity work in earlier centuries. Hofjes in Haarlem are the remnants of charity work that were founded by defunct community structures that were divided by religious order and social class, but all more or less guided by the then prevailing need to perform the Christian Seven Works of Mercy; feed the hungry, give drink to the thirsty, clothe the naked, bury the dead, shelter the traveler, comfort the sick, and free the imprisoned. Committing any of these acts would gain the giver entrance through the pearly gates of Heaven. This is what prompted so many wealthy Haarlem citizens to found Hofjes in their name on their death.

In Haarlem the city council became responsible for acts of mercy on a grand scale when the leper colony was founded outside the city walls in the town of Schoten in 1393. For centuries from all over Holland, lepers had to come to Haarlem to get an attestatie or proof of leprosy, as a legal permit to beg. Similarly, the Haarlem Beul, or city executioner, "freed" prisoners all over the country from Amsterdam to Ghent by chopping their heads off. This led to the Dutch saying zo brutaal als de beul van Haarlem, meaning "as brutal as the Haarlem executioner". This morbid practise was only stopped in the beginning of the seventeenth century. The Haarlem leper colony, Het Dolhuys, still exists and is currently a museum.

In 1347, the first mention of a 'Gasthuys' is made in Haarlem archives. After the leper colony was founded (in the name of Saint Lazarus), a new gasthuys, in the name of Saint Elisabeth, was built on the Verwulft where the sick were treated that did not need quarantine outside the city walls. This hospital grew until the fire that burned it down. Hofje van Loo was an add-on that survived. The Elisabeth Gasthuys (later called EG) was rebuilt on the location of a former monastery (cellenbroers or minnebroers) in the Groot Heiligland (across the street from the Frans Hals Museum today) where it operated from 1581 to 1971. Originally a church institution, it was now run by Haarlem council members, due to the Protestant Reformation. Since the German occupation of World War II, this hospital is no longer run by the Haarlem council, but still exists and is called the Kennemer Gasthuis today. The former buildings in the Groot Heiligland house a community center and have been converted to homes.

== Management ==
The hofjes are managed by five board members called regents. Any community structure in Haarlem, be it a guild or a hofje, had a group of five regents or regentesses. Whenever there was a change of board members, a commemorative painting would be made. In paintings by Frans Hals' the regents of the Poor men's almshouse and the regents of the St. Elisabeth Gasthuys can be seen. Many guilds kept hofjes for their own aging members. When the guilds were disbanded under the French occupation in 1794, the guild regents kept their role as hofje regents, since the hofjes were at that time still quite wealthy. With the tiercering in 1810 however, the lack of revenues from both government bonds and guild membership dues was sorely felt and many hofjes went bankrupt and were disbanded.

== Wealth ==
It was the duty of the regents to care for the books and the behavior of the members. Many hofjes were quite wealthy, due to the high turnover of its members, who had to donate all of their possessions to the hofje in order to be accepted for living there. Other sources of income were lotteries, that were organized to build new premises or restore old ones. The living conditions between the various hofjes varied substantially, with each religious order competing to keep the most luxurious one. Today most of the surviving hofjes receive their income from housing rents.

== Origins ==
When talking of hofjes, most people refer to the name given to the buildings themselves, but the foundations they are based on may have moved premises several times since the original foundation date, and even changed their names. Hofjes in Haarlem were primarily the result of generous bequests by wealthy men or women in their own name, rather than from any group religious or municipal effort. Most hofjes were meant for elderly women, because there were far more poor aged women in the streets than poor aged men. However, after the iconoclasm of the Reformation in Haarlem in 1566, the Catholics (and their hofjes) were forced underground, and many became quite poor. When the 'Oudemannenhuis' opened in 1609, many of the poor men who were accepted were Catholics.

== List of Haarlem hofjes (by year of foundation) ==
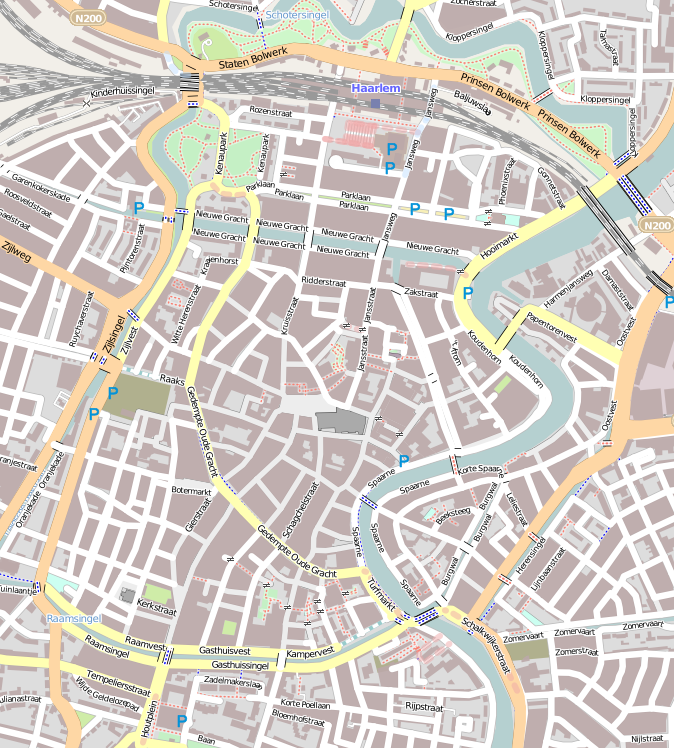
Some of the larger hofjes in Haarlem
- 1395: Hofje van Bakenes (or Bakenesserkamer)
- 1435: St. Barbara Gasthuis (or Onse Lieve Vrouwegasthuis)
- 1440: Vrouwe- en Antonie Gasthuys (Merger of Onse Lieve Vrouwegasthuis op Bakenes, and Sint Antoniegasthuis)
- 1472: Brouwershofje (or Sint Maartensgasthuis)
- 1489: Hofje van Loo (or St. Elisabeth's Gasthuis)
- 1607: Frans Loenenhofje
- 1609: Frans Hals Museum (or Oudemannenhuis)
- 1609 & 1684: Hofje Codde en Van Beresteijn
- 1610: Bruiningshofje
- 1614: Lutherse Hofje
- 1616: Hofje In den Groenen Tuin
- 1616: Hofje van Guurtje de Waal
- 1640: Zuiderhofje
- 1650: Hofje van Willem Heythuijsen
- 1662: Wijnbergshofje
- 1730: Hofje van Staats
- 1752: Teylers Hofje (or 1787, see article)
- 1760: Hofje van Noblet
- 1768: Hofje van Oorschot
- 1773: Remonstrants Hofje
- 2001: Gravinnehof
- 2007: Johan Enschedé Hof
