= Frans Hals Museum =

Art museum in the Netherlands

- Entrance gate to the former Oudemannenhuis, which has housed the Frans Hals Museum since 1913.
- Interactive fullscreen map
- Established: 1862
- Location: Groot Heiligland 62; Haarlem, Netherlands
- Coordinates: 52°22′36″N 4°38′01″E
- Type: Art museum
- Director: Lidewij de Koekkoek
- Curators: Christi Klinkert (old art), Maaike Rikhof (modern art), Manique Hendricks (contemporary art)
- Website: franshalsmuseum.nl/en/

The Frans Hals Museum (formerly Stedelijk Museum van Haarlem) is a museum in the North Holland city of Haarlem, the Netherlands, founded in 1862, known as the Art Museum of Haarlem. Its collection is based on the city's own rich collection, built up from the 16th century onwards. The museum owns hundreds of paintings, including more than a dozen by Frans Hals, to whom the museum owes its name. The Frans Hals Museum is located in the Haarlem city centre, in the 17th-century Oudemannenhuis with regent's rooms. It houses the famous paintings by Frans Hals and other ancient, modern and contemporary art, as well as the museum café. Until August 2025, location Hal regularly hosted exhibitions of modern and contemporary art.

== History of the Oudemannenhuis ==
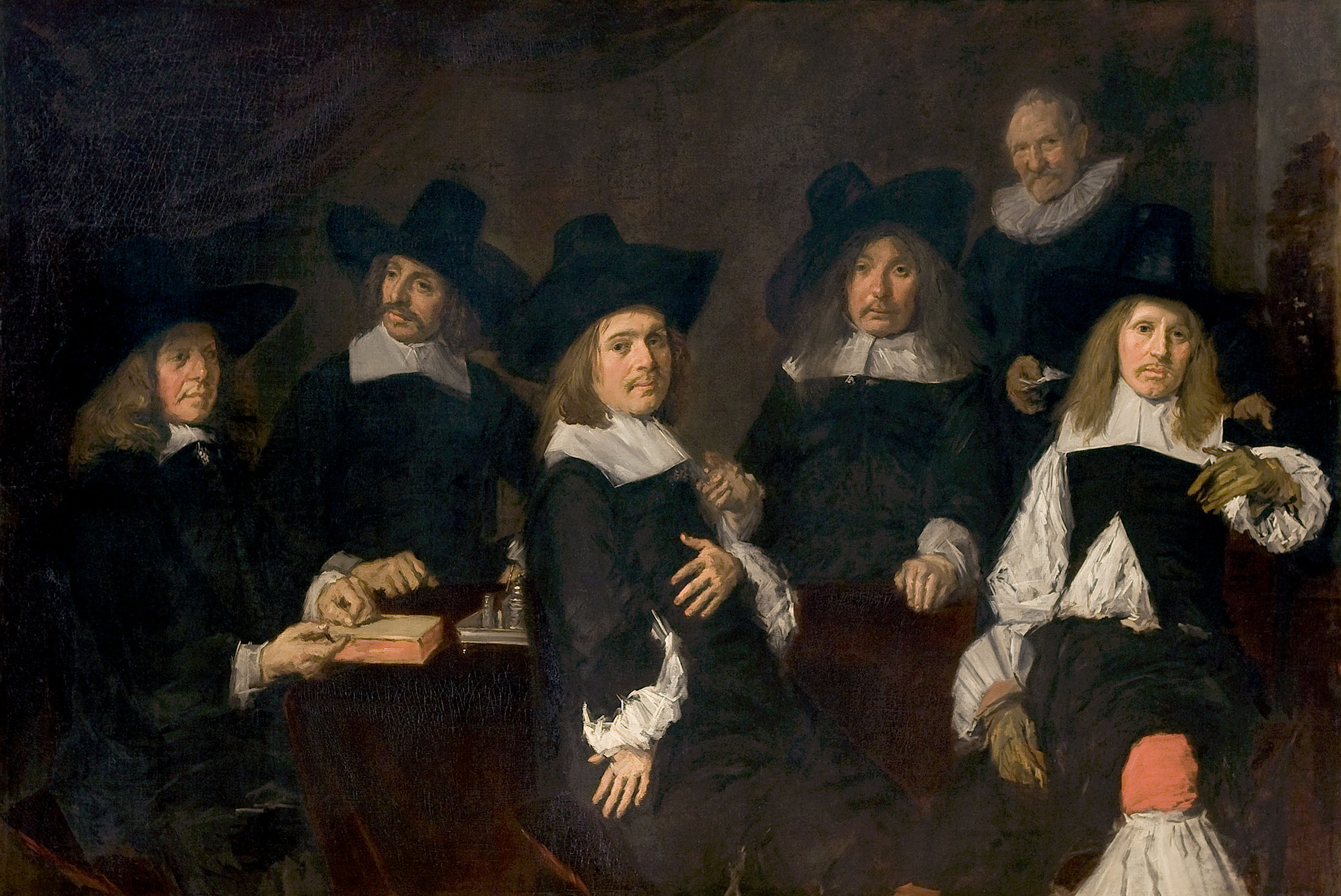
Group portrait of the Regents of the Old Men's Almshouse, by Frans Hals, 1664

The Haarlem Old Men's Almhouse (Oudemannenhuis) was a hofje founded in 1609. The residential rooms were situated around a courtyard in the style of contemporary Haarlem Hofjes. Each of the thirty little houses was inhabited by two men; to be eligible to living there they had to be at least 60 years old, honest Haarlem residents, and single. They were required to bring their own household goods listed as a bed, a chair with a cushion, a tin chamberpot, three blankets, six good shirts and six nightcaps. They were locked in each night at eight o'clock in the summer and at seven in the winter. The residents had to make a weekly collection with a poor-box, and a statue of a man holding this can be seen in the entrance hall of the museum. The old men's home was governed by five regents, whose portraits, painted by Frans Hals in 1664, are on display.

Though the men's home dates from 1609, only the main hall is still mostly intact. During the intervening centuries the complex was renovated beyond recognition, most notably by the previous inhabitants, the Haarlem municipal orphanage which made use of the complex from 1810 until 1908, when it moved to the Coen Cuserhof. During the French occupation, the old men still living in the hofje were moved a block away to the present-day Proveniershuis, when the art collections of the two institutions were merged. The art of both locations, as well as the art of several other former Haarlem institutions, is now in the Frans Hals museum collection. The most notable artworks from the Oude Mannenhuis are the two group portraits of regents and regentesses by Frans Hals. The inventory of the Proveniershuis was drawn up by Pieter Langendijk and though some of the paintings have since been reattributed, his list is largely intact. The impressive regents' rooms have been rebuilt from other Haarlem locations. A room on the street side has a curious keystone above the door with masonic symbols denoting a mason's society and the text 'Metsselaars Proef-Kamer 1648 12/29'.

== History of the collection ==
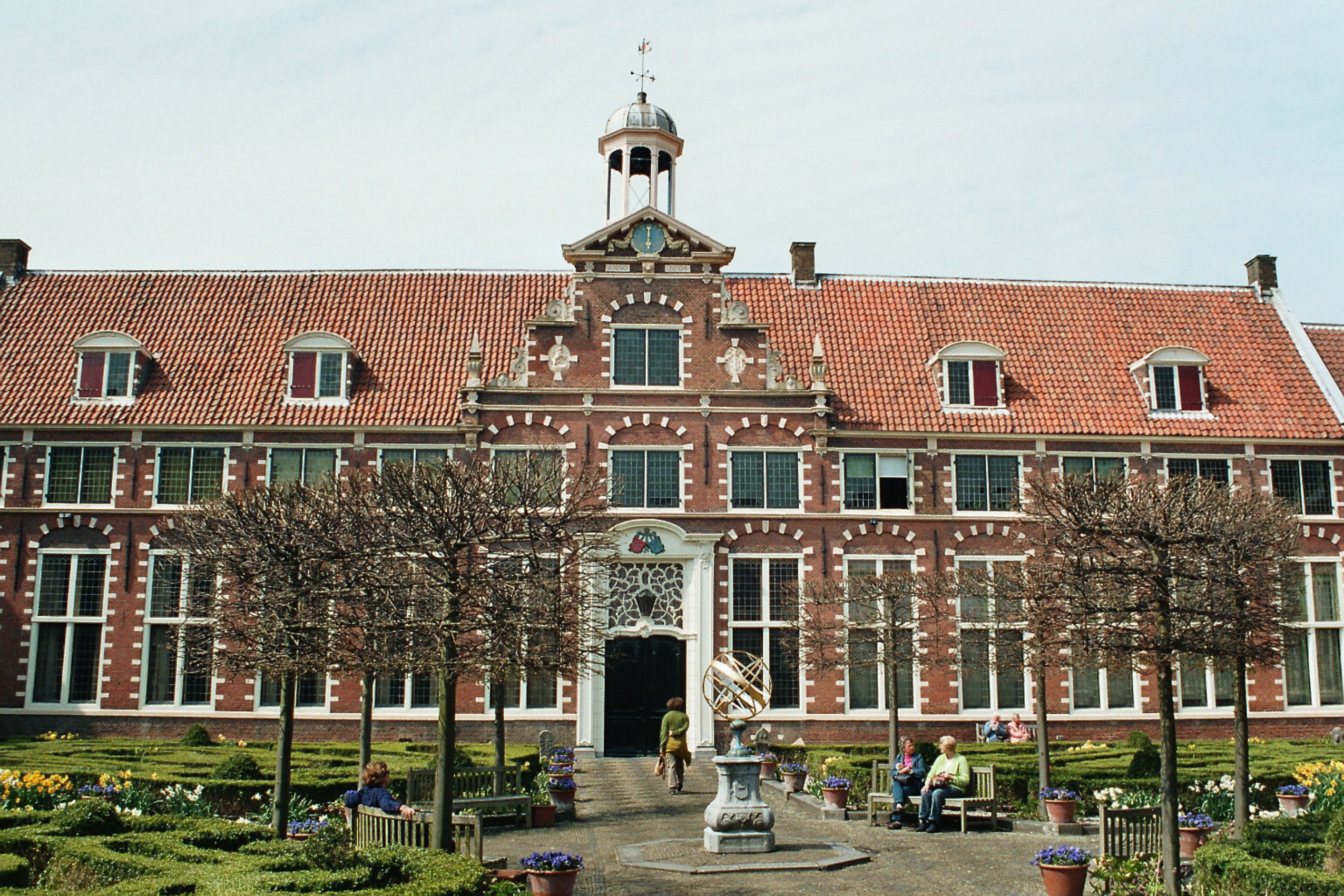

The older pieces of the museum collection, consisting of primarily religious themes, are Haarlem relics from the Reformation, when all Roman Catholic art was formally seized by the city council in 1648. Frans Hals himself worked as the first official city-paid restorer for some of these pieces. The city council then proceeded in the 17th century to rewrite Haarlem history, and purchased various large pieces to decorate the city hall, telling stories such as the legend of Damiate, or the legend of the Haarlem Shield. During this time the city hall functioned as a semi-public museum, though the term didn't even exist yet. The first signs of an official museum with a curator occurred when the Dutch Society of Science, founded in 1752, started to rent the Prinsenhof room of the city hall in 1754 for its meetings and began to furnish it as a Cabinet of curiosities. From an inventory list in the city archives it can be seen that they used as a model for their system of naming and presentation, the book Amboinsche Rariteitkamer by Georg Eberhard Rumphius. They shared the room with the Synod of the Dutch Reformed Church, that used it once every six years for its meetings. They hired a woman for the dusting and serving tea, and in 1768 they hired a man as curator, who was responsible for the entire collection and the medical Hortus garden in the yard.

The spacious room soon proved too small for the number of donated artifacts it received from its members, thanks to the increase in shipping and associated travel. In the late 18th century and early 19th century, Haarlem became a bedroom community of Amsterdam, with many wealthy bankers becoming members of the young Society. The old paintings became just a colorful backdrop for chests filled with stuffed animals and prepared specimens. In 1777, the Society moved its overflowing collection to a renovated house on the Grote Houtstraat, where the new young curator Martin van Marum would live the rest of his life. This building, situated next to the Mennonite church, was mortgaged with the Mennonite banker Pieter Teyler van der Hulst, who was not a member of the Society, but who created his own arts society and whose later testament would be the basis for the Teylers Museum, where van Marum would also become curator.

This move essentially split the collection, and the natural history half is currently in the collection of the Teylers Museum. Though the paintings and the garden remained back at city hall, 40 years after Carl Linnaeus had published his Systema Naturae no one was interested in the garden (which was set up as a living version of that book), and still fewer people were interested in the religious art. The city hall was seen as a depot of large pieces of historical importance, and the next large group of paintings to join the collection occurred when Napoleon disbanded the guilds in the Netherlands in 1794. The guilds' property reverted to the state. This is how the larger pieces that Hals painted for the guilds came into the collection. Without an official curator, the painting collection was only available to be seen by appointment with the city clerk, a situation that has remained up to the present day for the large pieces still located there, such as the whalebone from Willem Barentsz trip to Nova Zembla or the portrait of Kenau Simonsdochter Hasselaer.

=== Collection as of 1862 ===
In the mid-19th century the back cloisters were given an extra floor for additional showing space, and it was at this time that the museum opened its doors to the public via a separate entrance than the main city hall entrance. This was also the first time that all the group portraits could be shown hanging near each other. No works of modern art were bought at that time, and the decision to form the museum was to cater to the visitors of other Haarlem museums. At the time, modern art could be seen at the nearby Teylers Eerste Schilderijenzaal in Teylers Museum, and also in the gallery of the Museum voor Levende Nederlandsche Meesters, otherwise known as the Haarlemsche Paviljoen, a museum that was open from 1838 until 1885 in the former home of Henry Hope he called Villa Welgelegen. The art critic Victor de Stuers was very angry about Haarlem being the location of such museums, as there was no artistic climate there to speak of. He criticized the collection at the Paviljoen for lacking works by contemporary painters such as "Israëls, Bosboom, Bles, Bisschop, van de Sande Bakhuijzen, Bakker Korff, and Alma Tadema", and though works by these painters were already on view at Teylers at the time, the Frans Hals museum collection only has a few paintings by the first two in their collection today. Stuers also felt it was a scandal that the city fathers in charge of the municipal museum made no effort to stop the sale of a portrait of Willem van Heythuijzen to the Brussels museum in 1872.

Thus this antiquated collection is the one that was transferred to the Groot Heiligland in 1913, and large pieces that were not in the cloisters at that time, such as the painting by Dirck Ferreris installed in the mayor's room, remained at city hall. A few of these were formally given to the museum in 1962, such as The Banquet of the Officers of the St Adrian Militia Company in 1627 and The Officers of the St Adrian Militia Company in 1630. In 1962, when the museum celebrated its 100th anniversary as a municipal collection, the collection had already been split again into a modern and a classical one, with the modern art housed in a new wing on the north side of the complex. Today the modern art is displayed in the Verweyhal. The museum celebrated its 100th anniversary on the Groot Heiligland in 2013 with a Frans Hals exhibition that included reproductions being placed around the city in original locations.

== Collection ==
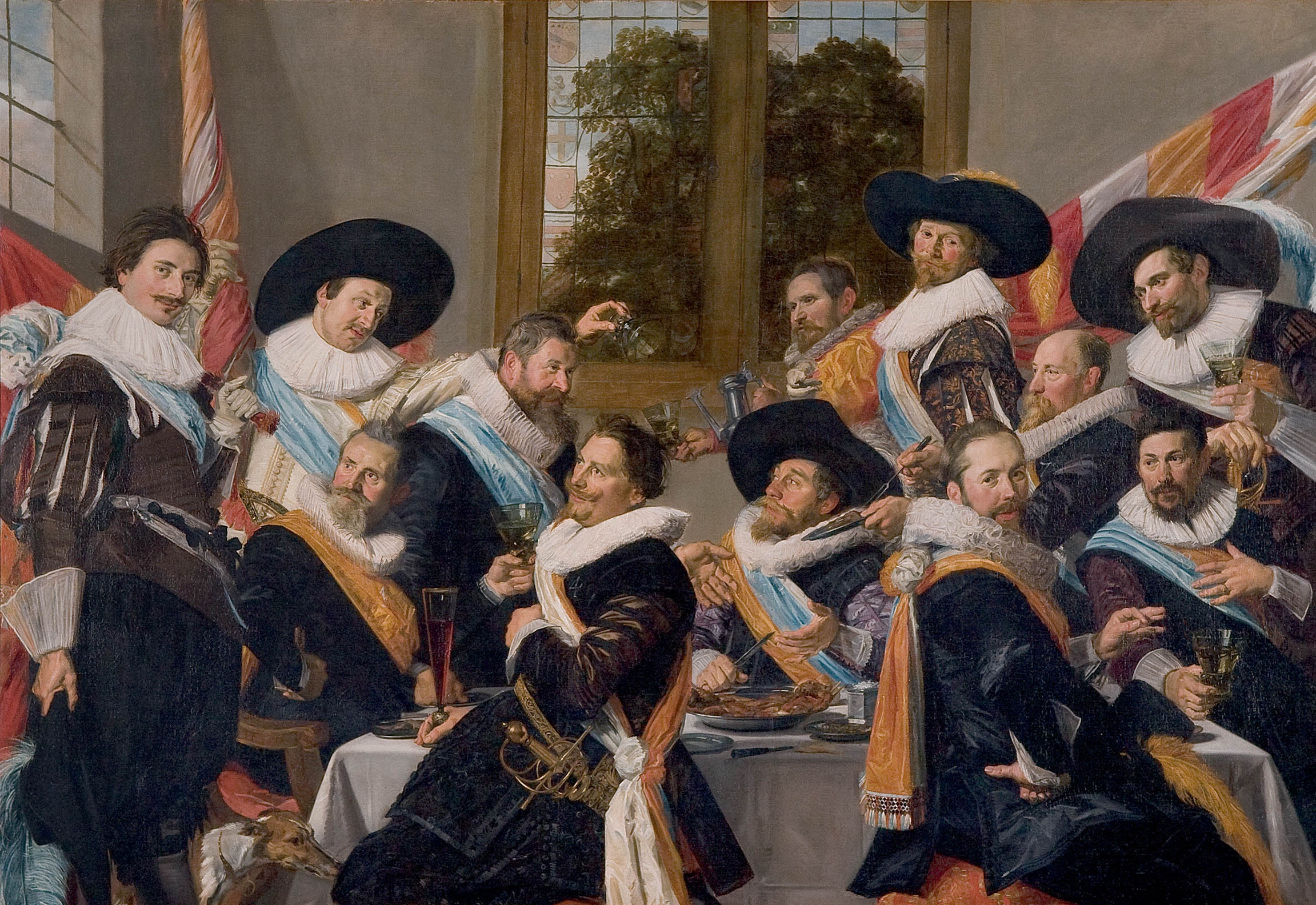
Frans Hals, Banquet of the Officers of the Calivermen Civic Guard, 1627, Frans Hals Museum, Haarlem.

In the late 19th century, the museum became something of a pilgrimage site for young impressionists, who were fascinated by the loose brushwork visible in the two group portraits of regents by Hals that he painted when he was in his eighties. This is the reason that after the move to the present location in 1913, the museum took on the name of Frans Hals as these were considered the most prominent paintings of the collection at the time. The museum is still famous for group portraits by Hals, but since the group portraits from the military guilds were cleaned in the early 20th century, it is these which most visitors come to see today. Most of the objects and paintings can not be displayed for lack of space, and the museum rotates its collection through exhibitions at various locations in Haarlem, though works by some prominent painters cannot be lent out and remain in storage.

The museum's collection has a size of 17,000 objects, about half of which are modern art. The museum holds about 800 paintings from the Dutch 17th century. The collection also includes silver and glassware and furniture. The depot, as well as the restoration studio, is located in the attics. Climatic conditions were so bad that in 2005 the museum considered selling two paintings to finance an external depot. This led to dismissive reactions from the State Secretary for Culture, among others, and the heirs also appeared to be unaware. After an asbestos clean-up in 2011, the condition improved somewhat, but the structural lack of money remained.

=== Frans Hals ===
Frans Hals ranks with Rembrandt and Vermeer among the most famous and innovative painters of the Dutch 17th century. His smoothly painted, lively portraits of real people have inspired visitors and other artists for centuries. Famous modern artists such as Manet and Van Gogh even travelled to Haarlem to admire his group portraits of bailiffs and regents.

Frans Hals was born around 1582 in Antwerp, but grew up in Haarlem. His parents moved north soon after his birth to escape Spanish rule. Frans Hals probably trained as an artist with Karel van Mander. In 1610, Hals became a member of the Sint-Lucas guild of artists.

His loose touch caught the eye and earned him numerous commissions for portraits. In 1616, Hals completed his first large group portrait: the militia piece of the St George's militia. He received four more commissions for militia pieces. They are now world-famous and all hang in the Frans Hals Museum.

=== Installed art from other Haarlem locations ===
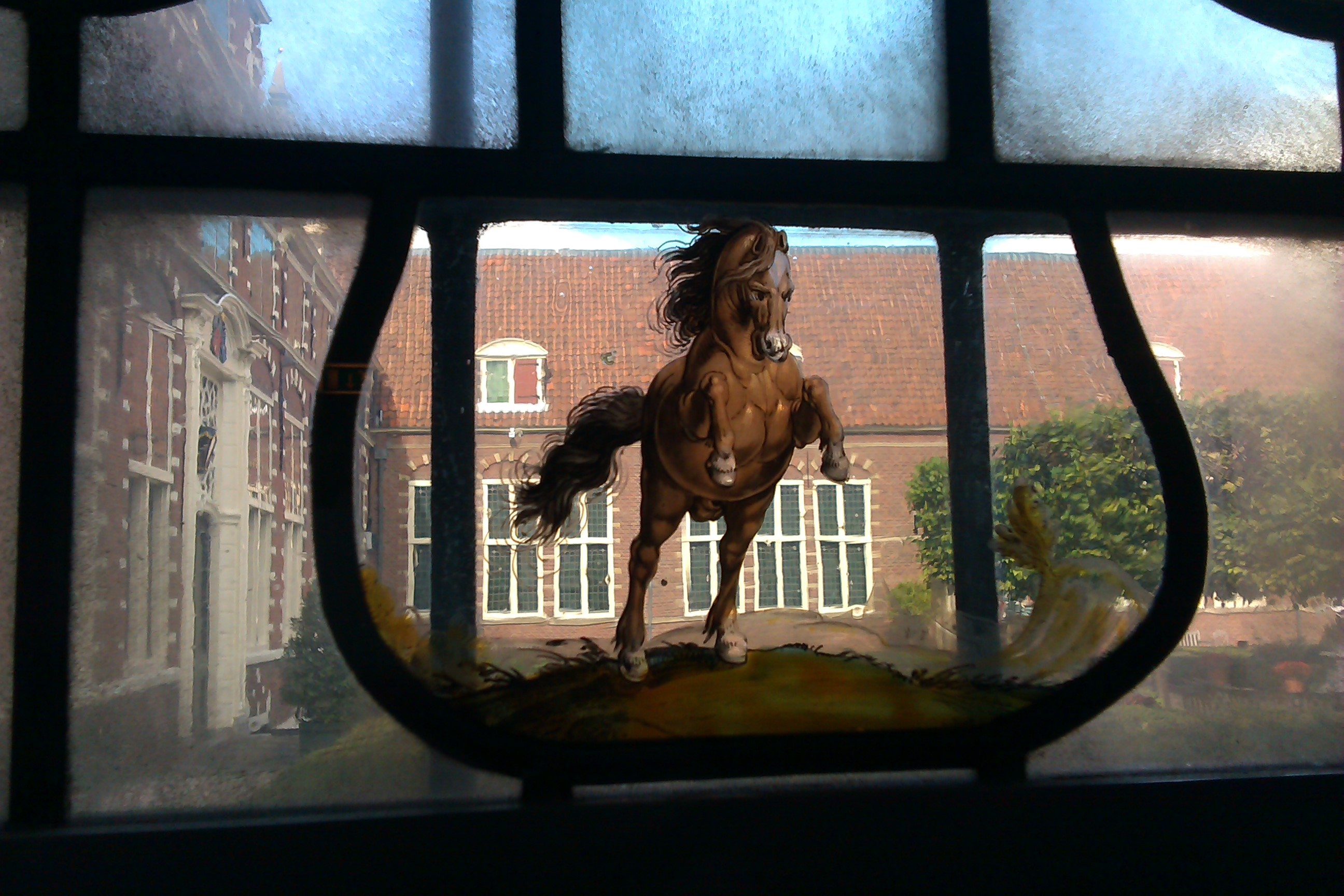
A window overlooking the courtyard in the museum

Several stately rooms saved from torn-down Haarlem houses have been partially reconstructed and a collection of Haarlem silver saved from various local churches can be seen in the former regent rooms of the almshouse, which now seem much grander than they were originally. The windows have been decorated with art by anonymous Haarlem glass artists, most of which has been acquired through municipal demolitions work. Spread along the corridors are beautiful Dutch tiles from local salvage operations that have been installed along the walls, accompanied by 17th century furniture including clocks, chairs, and chests.

The museum as an institution is only responsible for its collection, which is mostly oil paintings. Other applied art that has been installed is the responsibility of the municipal culture department, and the museum rents the premises from them. This is the reason that visitors are offered much more information about the paintings than about other aspects of the building, including the objects in the courtyard.

Between 1605 and 1635, over 100,000 paintings were produced in Haarlem. Not all of these have survived, and most have left town, but this does say something about the artistic climate in the city. At that time art ownership in the city was 25%, a record high. More art has survived up to today from that period in Haarlem than from any other Dutch city, thanks mostly to the Schilder-boeck published by Karel van Mander there in 1604. The former curator Pieter Biesboer has created inventories of Haarlem art and worked on several catalogues for the museum, mostly based on the works created before 1800.

What follows is a list of the prominent painters through the centuries on display in the museum.

- Adriaen Brouwer, 1605–1638
- Bartholomeus van der Helst, 1613–1670
- Cornelis Claesz van Wieringen, 1580–1633
- Cornelis van Haarlem, 1562–1638
- Dirck Hals, 1591–1656
- Floris van Dijck, 1575–1651
- Frans Hals, 1582–1666

- Gerrit Berckheyde, 1638–1698
- Hendrick Goltzius, 1558–1617
- Hendrik Cornelisz. Vroom, 1566–1640
- Jacob van Ruisdael, 1628–1682
- Jan de Bray, 1627–1697
- Jan Miense Molenaer, 1610–1668

- Jan Steen, 1625–1679
- Jan van Scorel, 1495–1562
- Johannes Verspronck, 1597–1662
- Judith Leyster, 1609–1660
- Karel van Mander, 1548–1606
- Maarten van Heemskerck, 1498–1574
- Nicolaes Berchem, 1622–1683
- Pieter Claesz, 1597–1660
- Pieter Saenredam, 1597–1665
- Salomon de Bray, 1597–1664
- Salomon van Ruysdael, 1600–1670
- Willem Claeszoon Heda, 1594–168

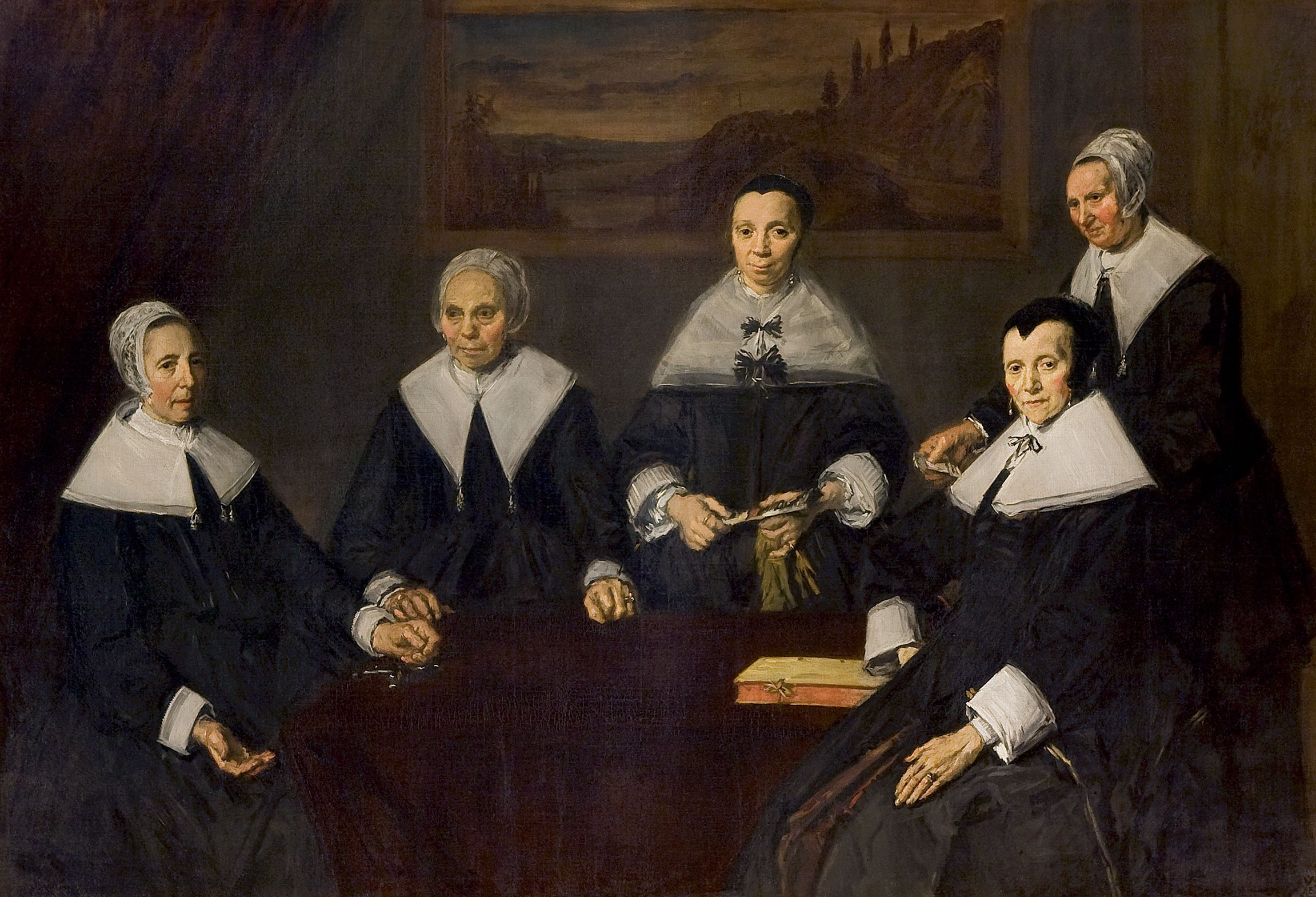
Frans Hals, Regentesses of the Old Men’s Alms House, ca. 1664, Frans Hals Museum, Haarlem.

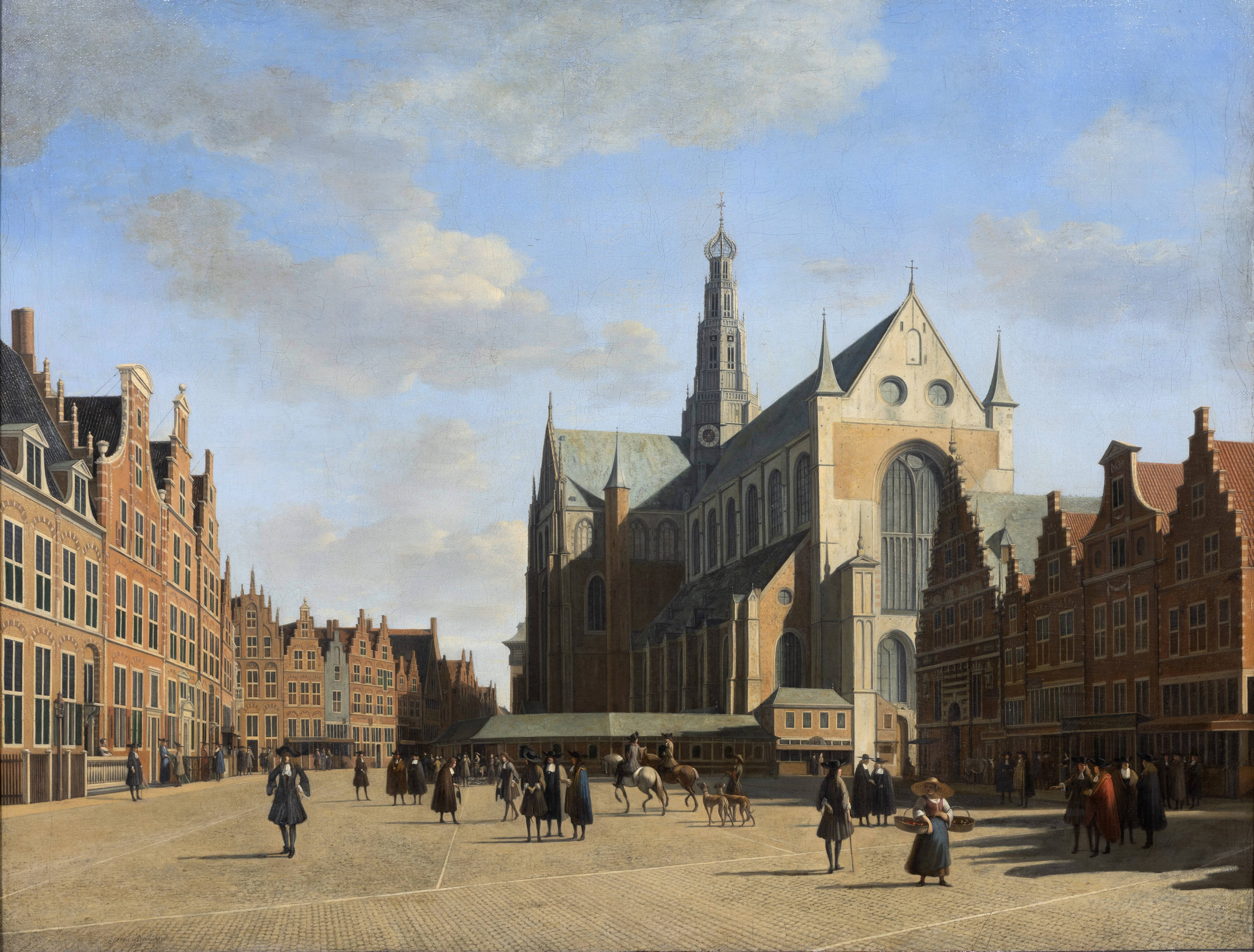
Gerrit Adriaensz Berckheyde, The Grote Markt in Haarlem with the Grote or St Bavokerk, seen from the West, 1696, Frans Hals Museum, Haarlem.

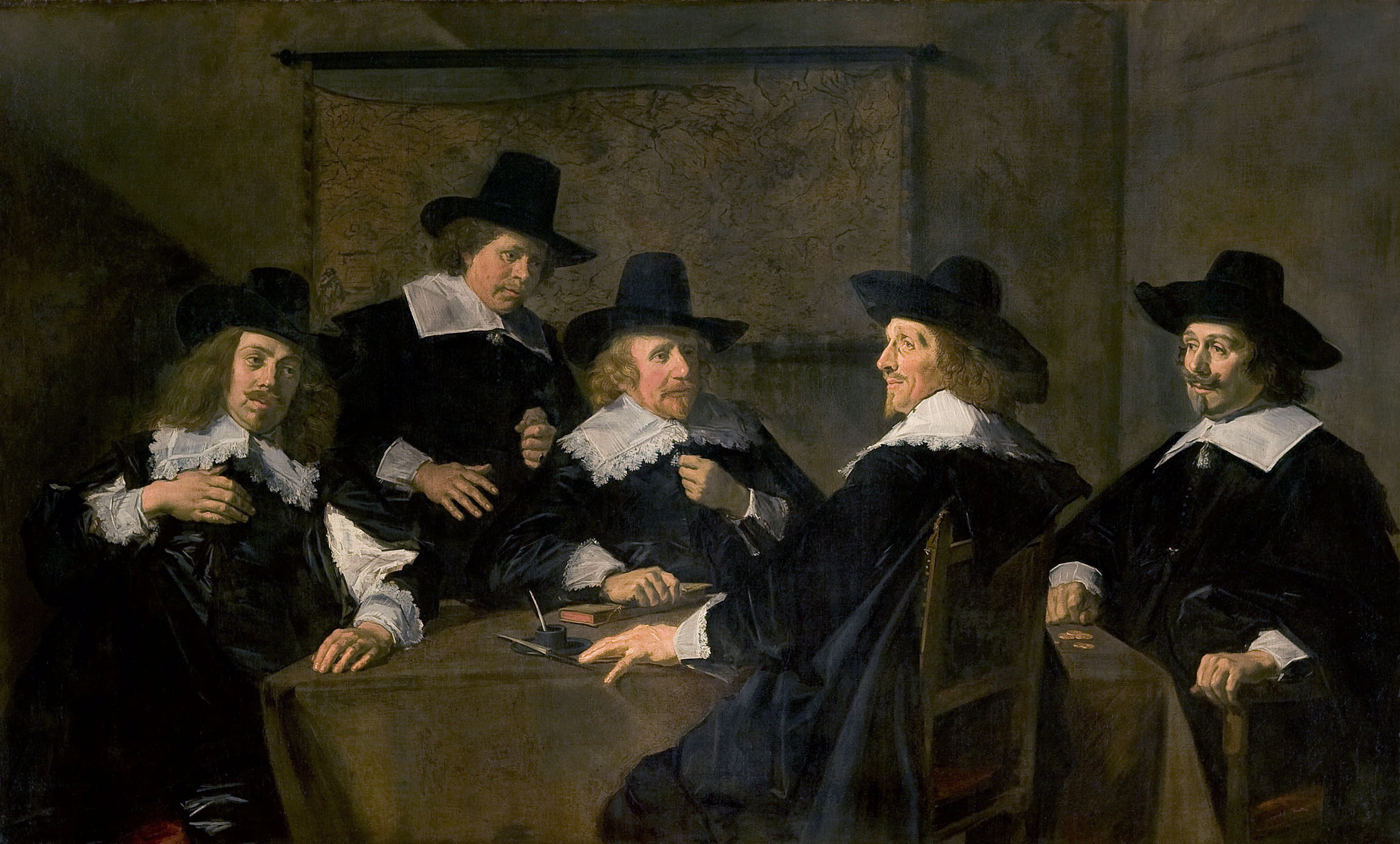
Frans Hals, Regents of St Elisabeth’s Hospital, ca. 1641, Frans Hals Museum, Haarlem.

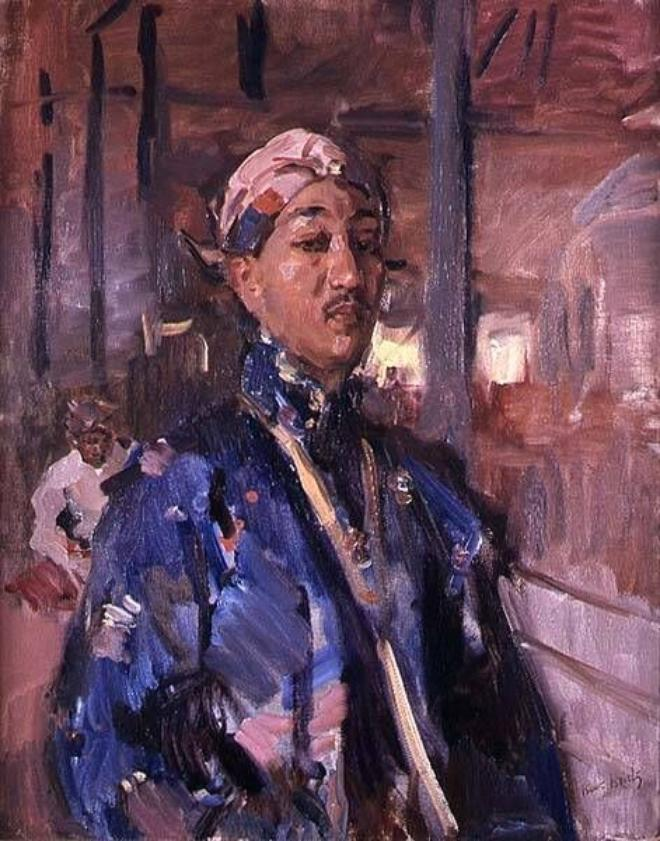
Isaac Lazarus Israels, Portrait of Mankunegara VII, a Javanese Ruler, 1922, Frans Hals Museum, Haarlem.

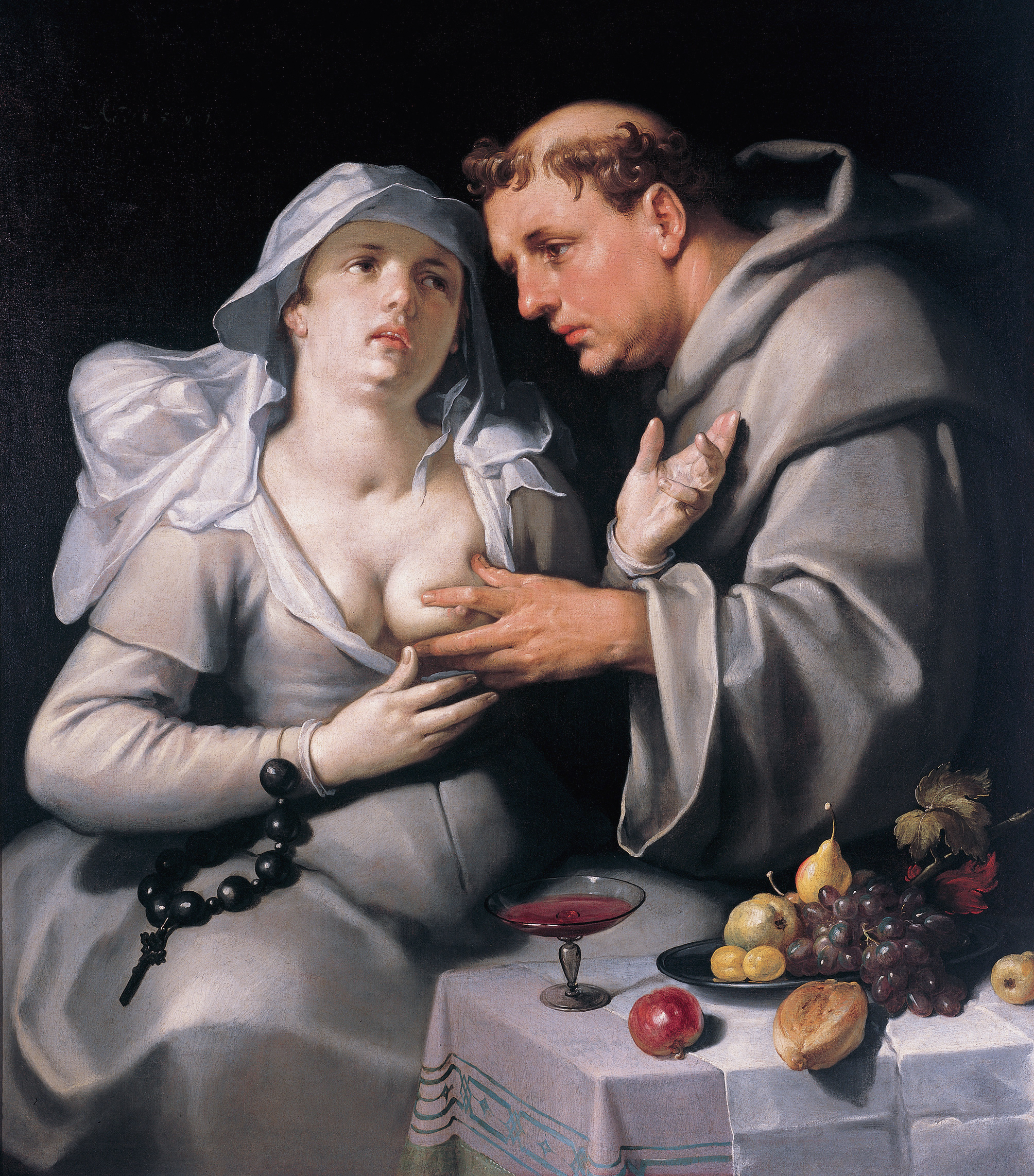
Cornelis Cornelisz. van Haarlem, A Monk and a Nun, 1590, Frans Hals Museum, Haarlem.

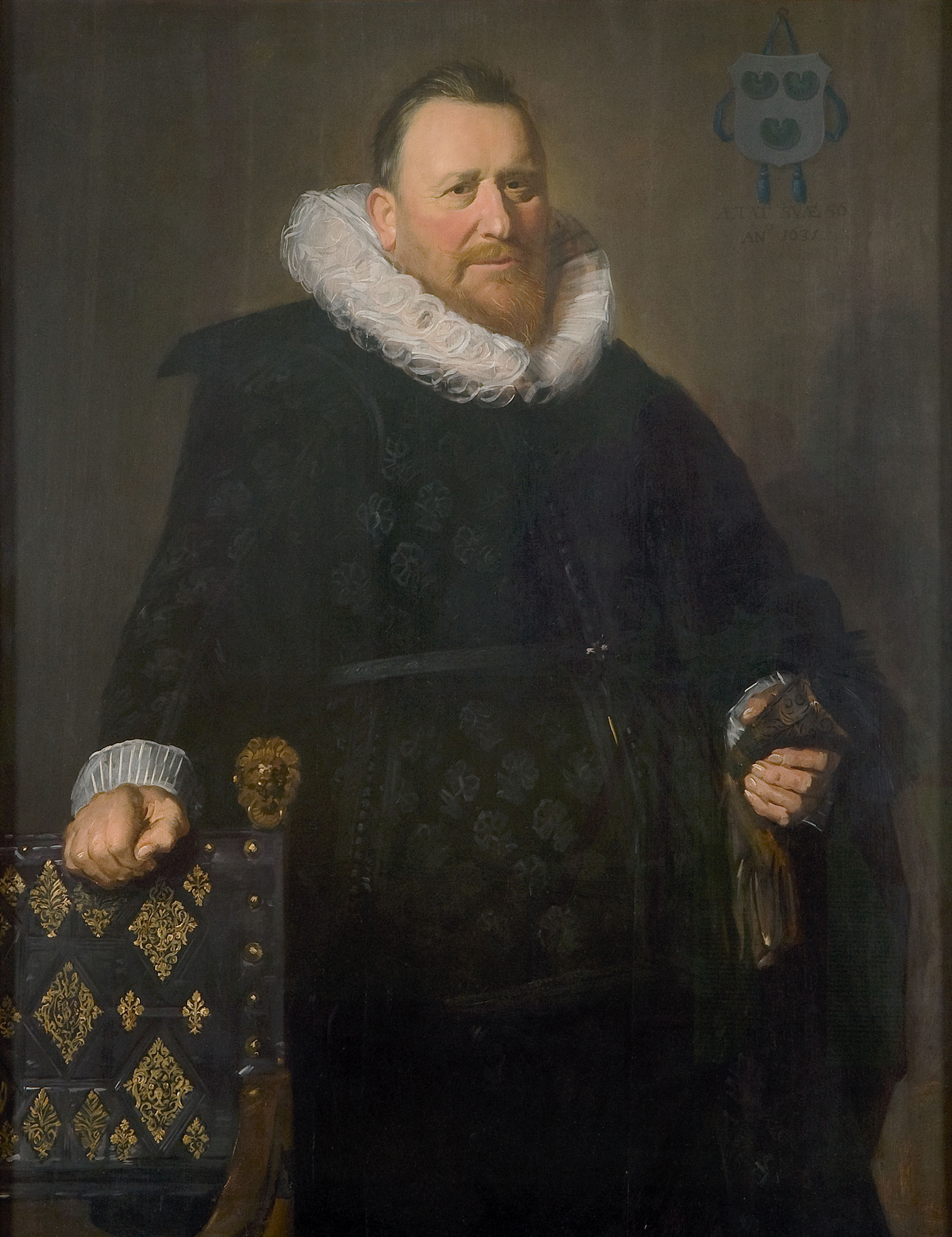
Frans Hals, Portrait of Nicolaes van der Meer, 1631, Frans Hals Museum, Haarlem.

== See also ==
- Pride and Joy: Children's Portraits in The Netherlands 1500-1700 art exhibition by the Frans Hals Museum in 2000
- List of paintings by Frans Hals
