= Bruiningshofje =

Coordinates: 52°22′48″N 4°37′54″E

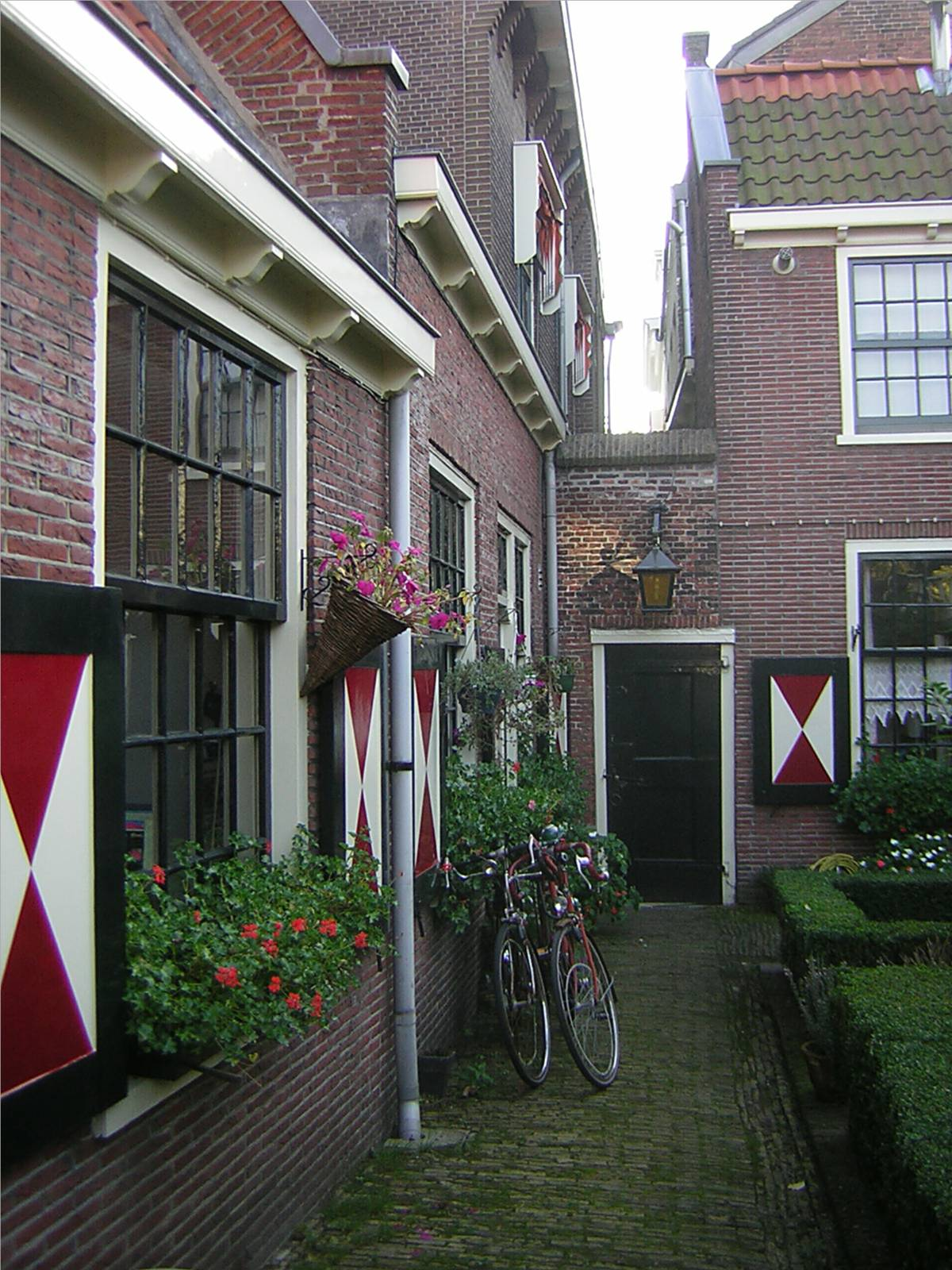
Bruiningshofje

The Bruiningshofje is a hofje in Haarlem, Netherlands.

== History ==
It was founded in 1610 by Jan Bruininck Gerritz (it i s assumed), and is one of four hofjes owned by the Mennonite church of Haarlem. The others are the Wijnbergshofje in the Barrevoetestraat, the Zuiderhofje on the Zuiderstraat, and the Blokshofje on the Klein Heiligland (sold in 1970). The founder was from Sneek, and he probably founded the hofje with his daughters in mind, since he had several of them and family members were given first rights to a place in the hofje. The earliest documents surviving date from after this original donor died. A document survives from 1647 in which a sum of 150 Carolus guldens is recorded for adding a new house and garden, received from Lysbeth van Blenckvliet. This early donor was also the founder of the Zuiderhofje, and explains why the garden is managed by the Zuiderhofje gardener.

== Living conditions ==
We know something about the living conditions in this hofje from the list of women who came to live there, compared to the list of deaths, though only the more prominent names are recorded. These women tended to live longer than the general population. The list of donations in the form of preuves. is also quite long; many opted to give a small amount (5 cents) to the women on their death-day. In 1800 this had grown to free rent for all six women, and during the year the following goods for the hofje: 20 5-cent pieces each week, 20 tons turf, two 20-pound barrels of butter, two sacks of potatoes, and a half-sack of salt.

The hofje originally had rooms for six women with a common privy in the garden. It wasn't renovated for running water or gas heat until 1936, when a redesign was executed, resulting in five homes. It was again renovated in 1978, and the number of houses was reduced again from five to four. The hofje was once one of the wealthiest of Haarlem, and is still quite well off today. The rent is free for the four women living there; they only need to pay service costs.

Address: Botermarkt 9
