= Hofje In den Groenen Tuin =

Hofje in Haarlem, Netherlands

Coordinates: 52°22′49″N 4°38′13″E

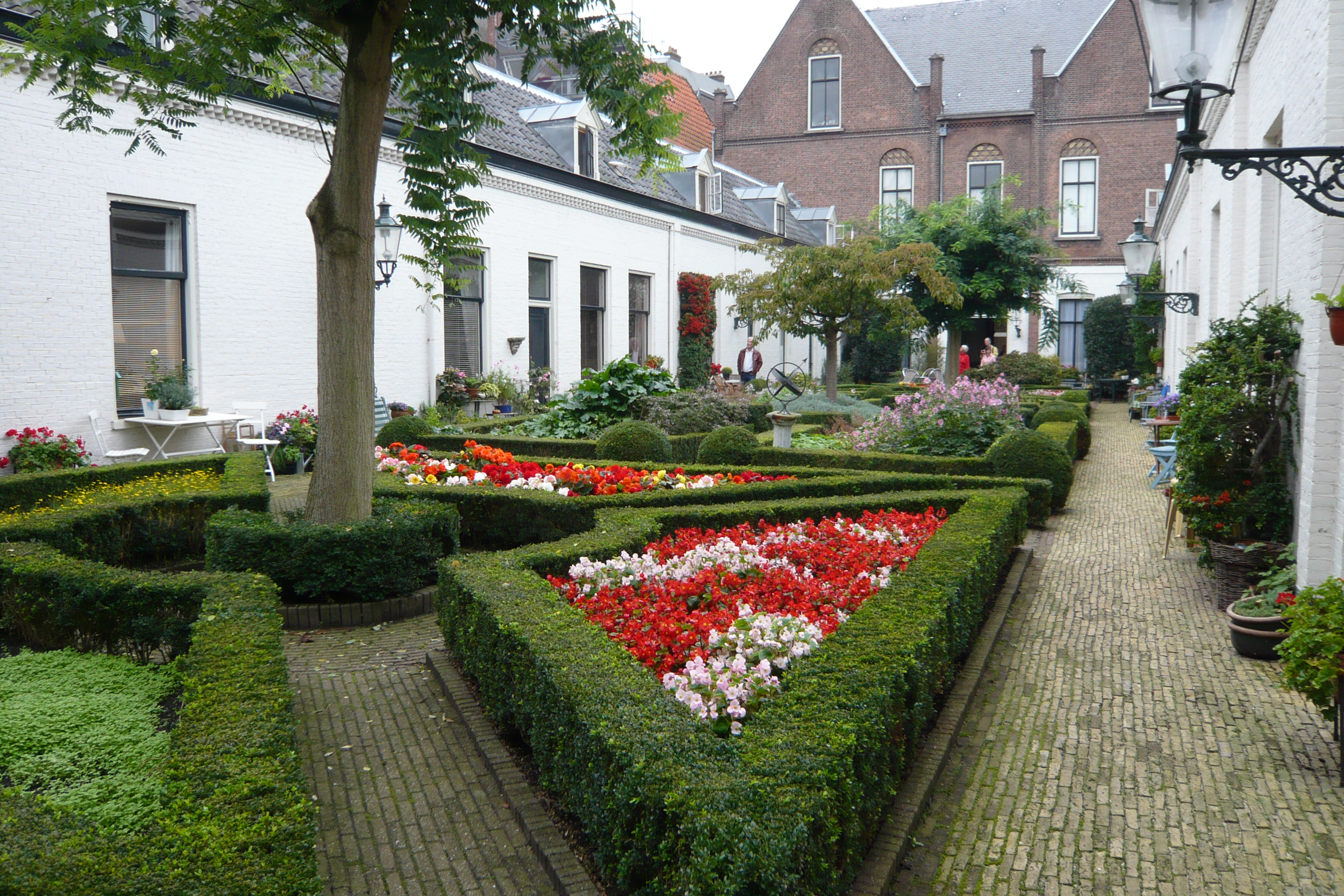
Garden of Hofje "In den Groene Tuin". In the back is the building with the main entrance and the regents' room.

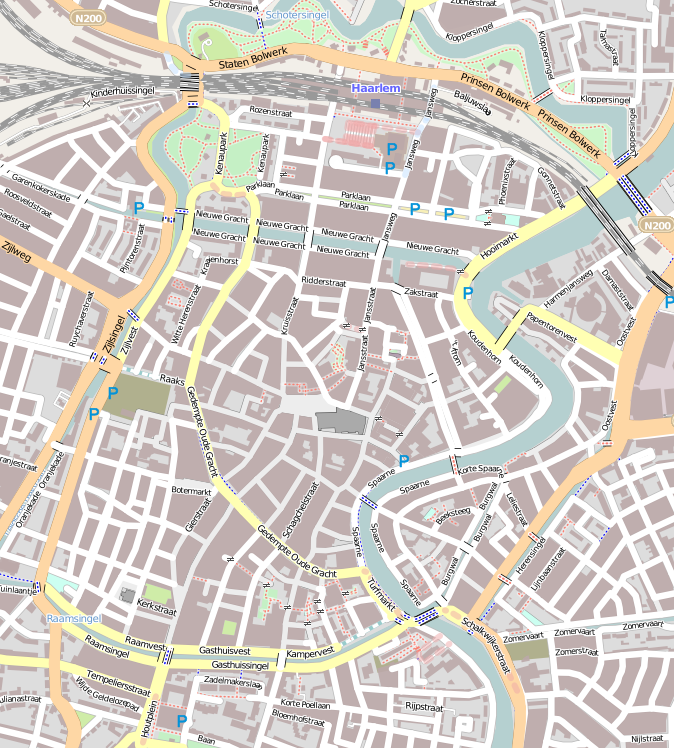
The Hofje In den Groenen Tuin is located between Warmoesstraat and Lange Veerstraat.

The Hofje in den Groenen Tuin is a hofje in Haarlem, Netherlands.

== History ==
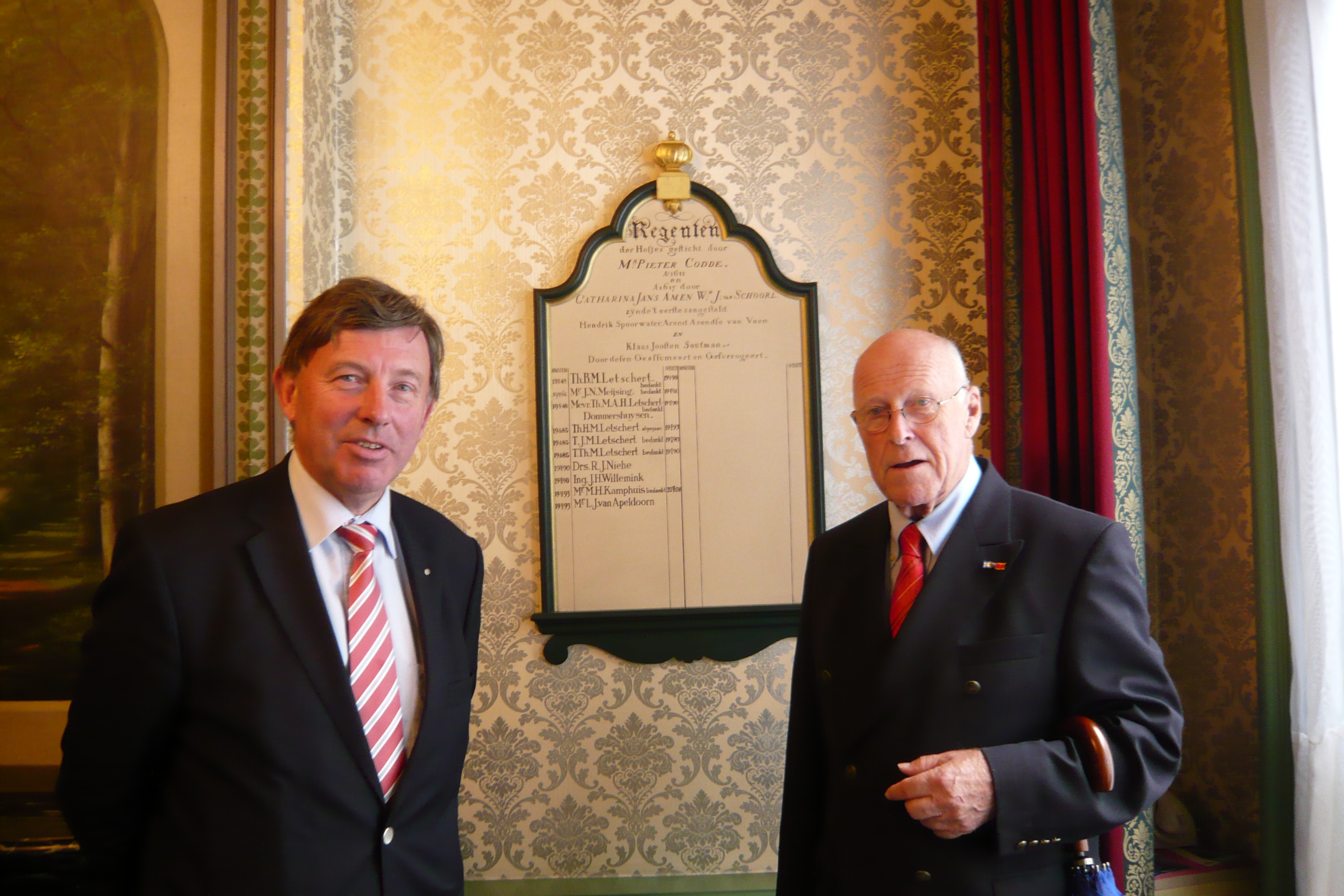
Hofje regents Drs. R. J. Niehe and Ing. J.H. Willemink in the regents' room.

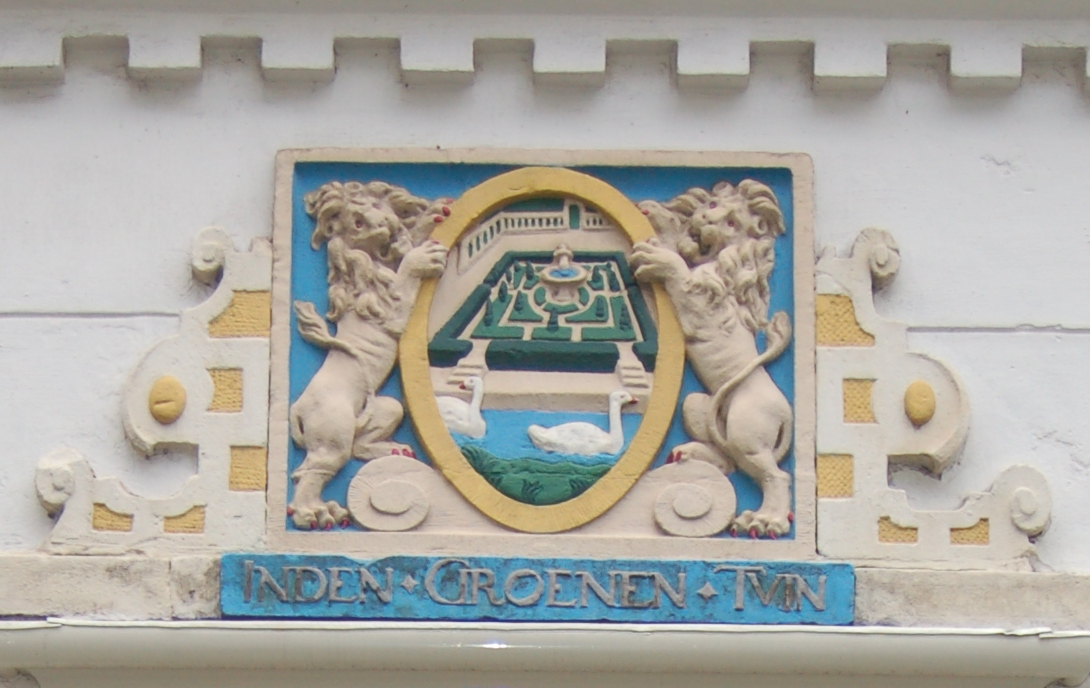
Gable stone over the rear entrance in the Lange Veerstraat.

It was founded in 1616 by Catherina Jansdr. Amen, the widow of Jacob Claesz. van Schoorl. In 1885-6 the hofje was completely rebuilt and the number of houses for pensioners was brought back to 18 from 20 in order to gain space and make the homes more suitable for modern living.

Though today the restrictions no longer apply, a copy of the old rules and regulations for the Hofje is posted near the front door. It states that members must be at least 50 years old, and still able to make a living, so that they are not a burden to the Hofje. Furthermore, they must purchase their place with 50 guilders, and bring a bed, 6 sheets, decent clothing and wool and linens. This will be controlled and registered by the regents. Meanwhile, everything that the pensioner earns or is awarded, or inherits, will all revert to the Hofje when the pensioner dies.

It is open to the public Monday to Friday from 10:00 AM to 12:00 Noon.

Its address is Warmoesstraat 23.
