= Hofje van Guurtje de Waal =

Hofje in Haarlem, Netherlands

Coordinates: 52°22′41″N 4°37′49″E

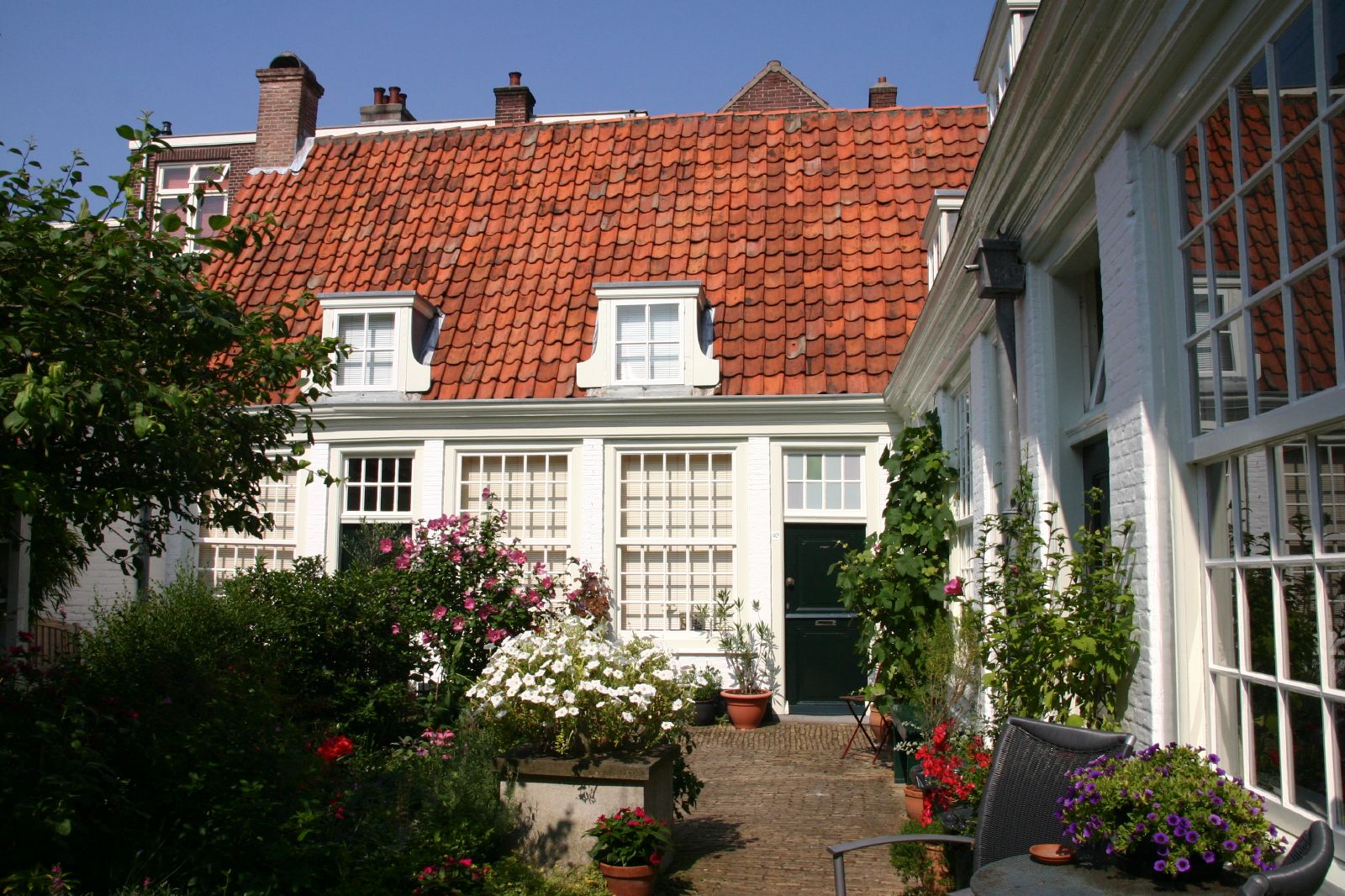
Hofje van Guurtje de Waal

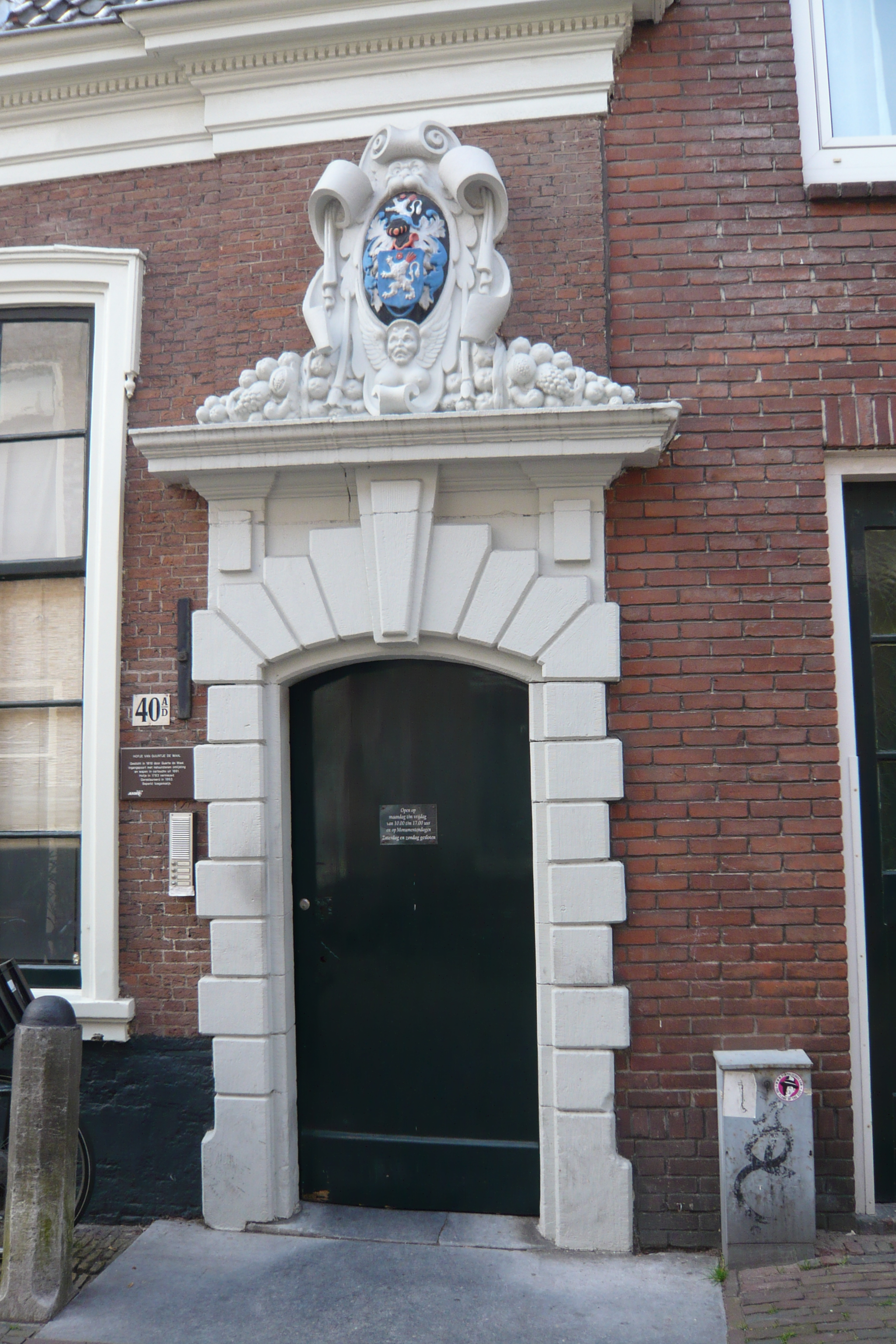
Gateway on Lange Annastraat

Hofje van Guurtje de Waal is a hofje in Haarlem, Netherlands.

== History ==
It was founded in 1616 by Guerte Jansdochter de Wael, daughter of a rich textile trader, for poor women of the Dutch Reformed faith. She died in 1632. Originally 6 small houses, it was expanded to 8 houses in 1661 when the gateway was built with the family coat of arms. This coat-of-arms is fairly unusual, featuring the Dutch Lion with its head cut off, spouting blood. It has been supposed that this shows anti-orangist political sympathies.

Until 1853 governance by female regents was handed down from mother to daughter. From that time on it was governed by the city council and slowly declined. In 1985 the complex was remodelled into 4 modern homes. Since then it is technically no longer a hofje and is managed by a Haarlem house-rental agency.

Address: Lange Annastraat 40
