= Zuiderhofje =

Almshouse in Haarlem, Netherlands

Coordinates: 52°22′51″N 4°37′51″E

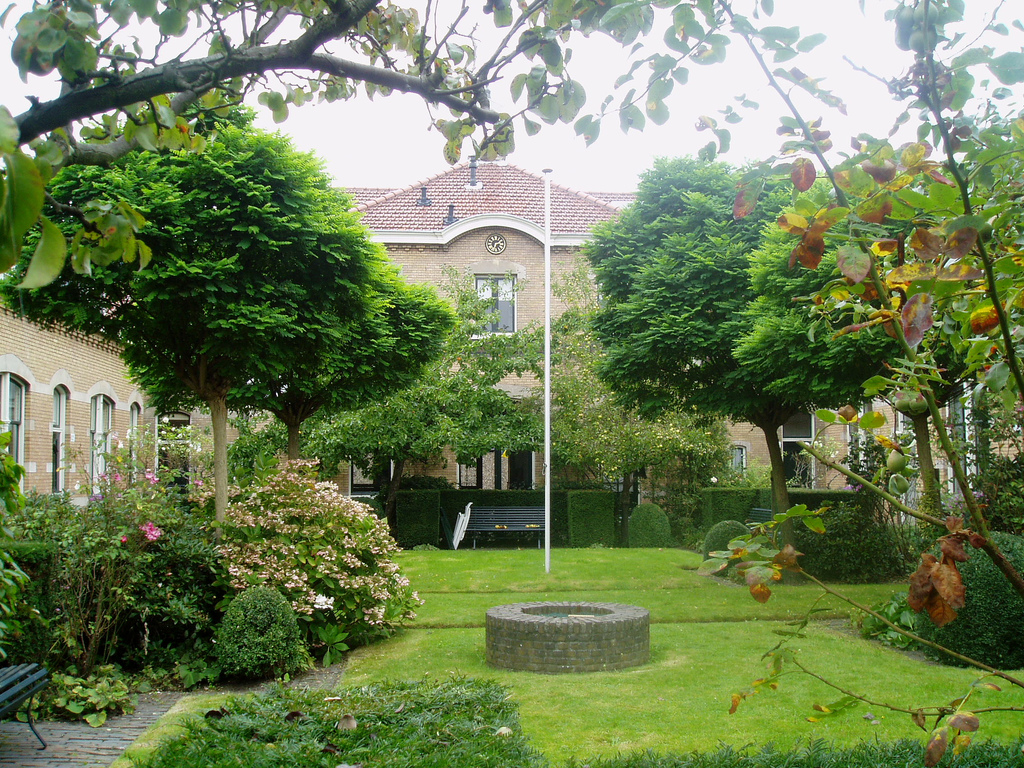
Zuiderhofje

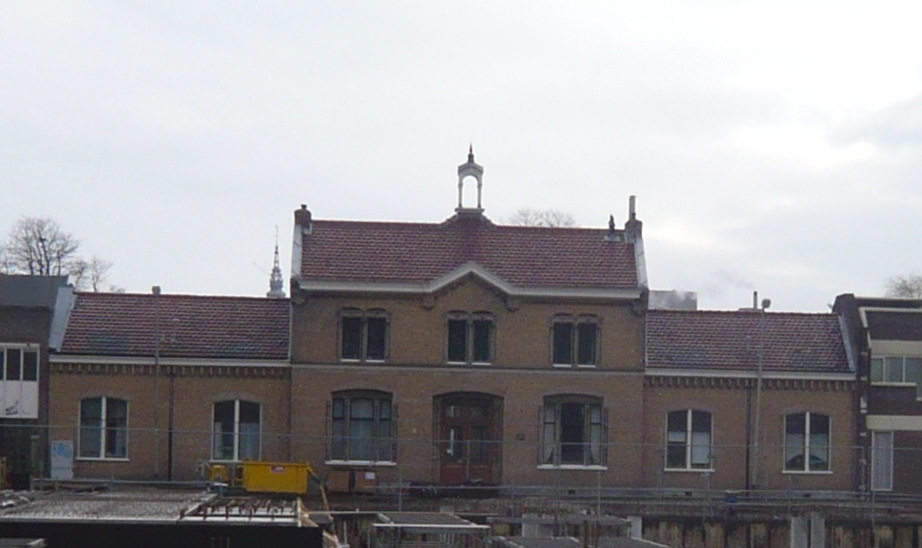
Front of Zuiderhofje on the Zuiderstraat during construction of underground parking garage on the Raaks.

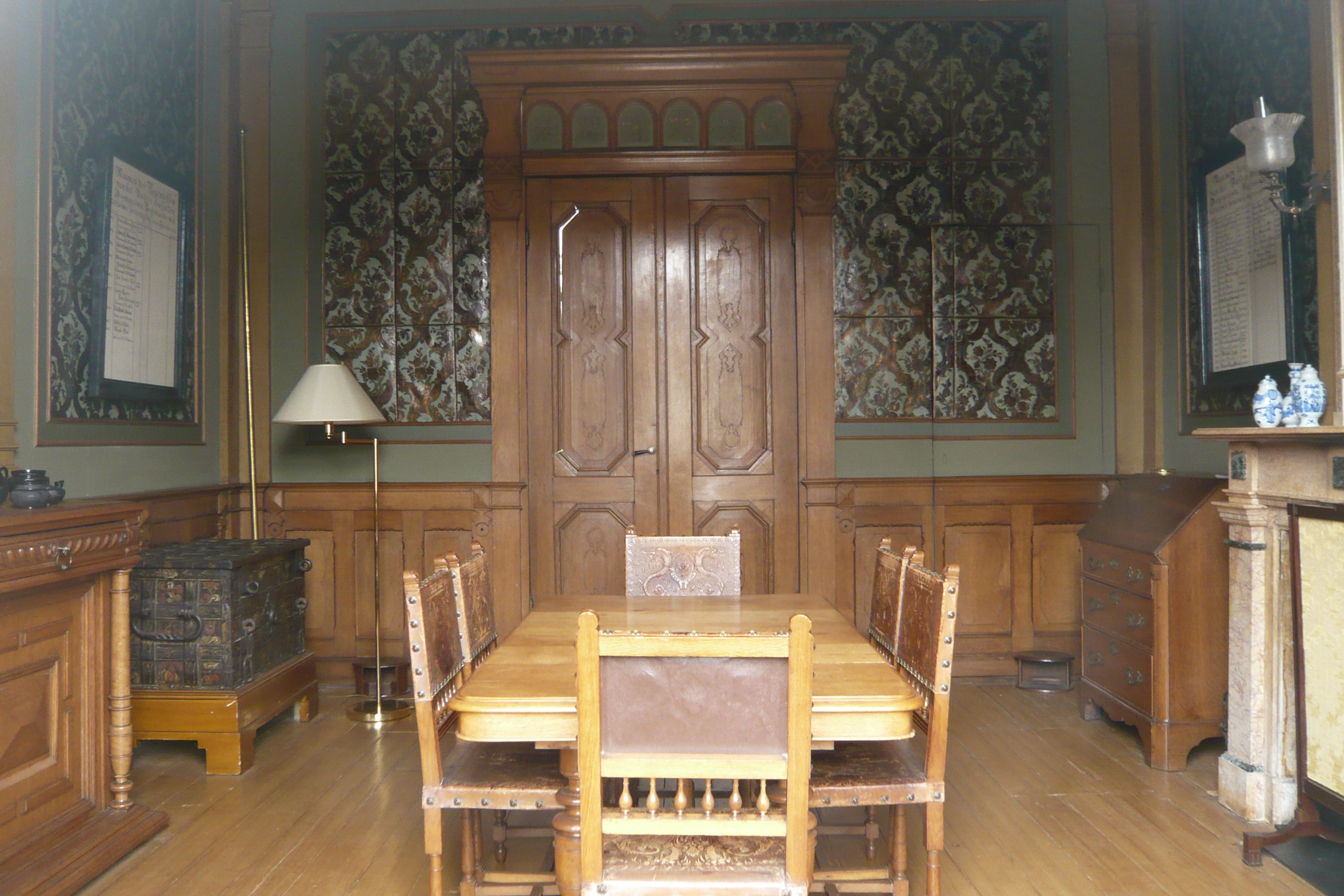
Zuiderhofje regent's room.

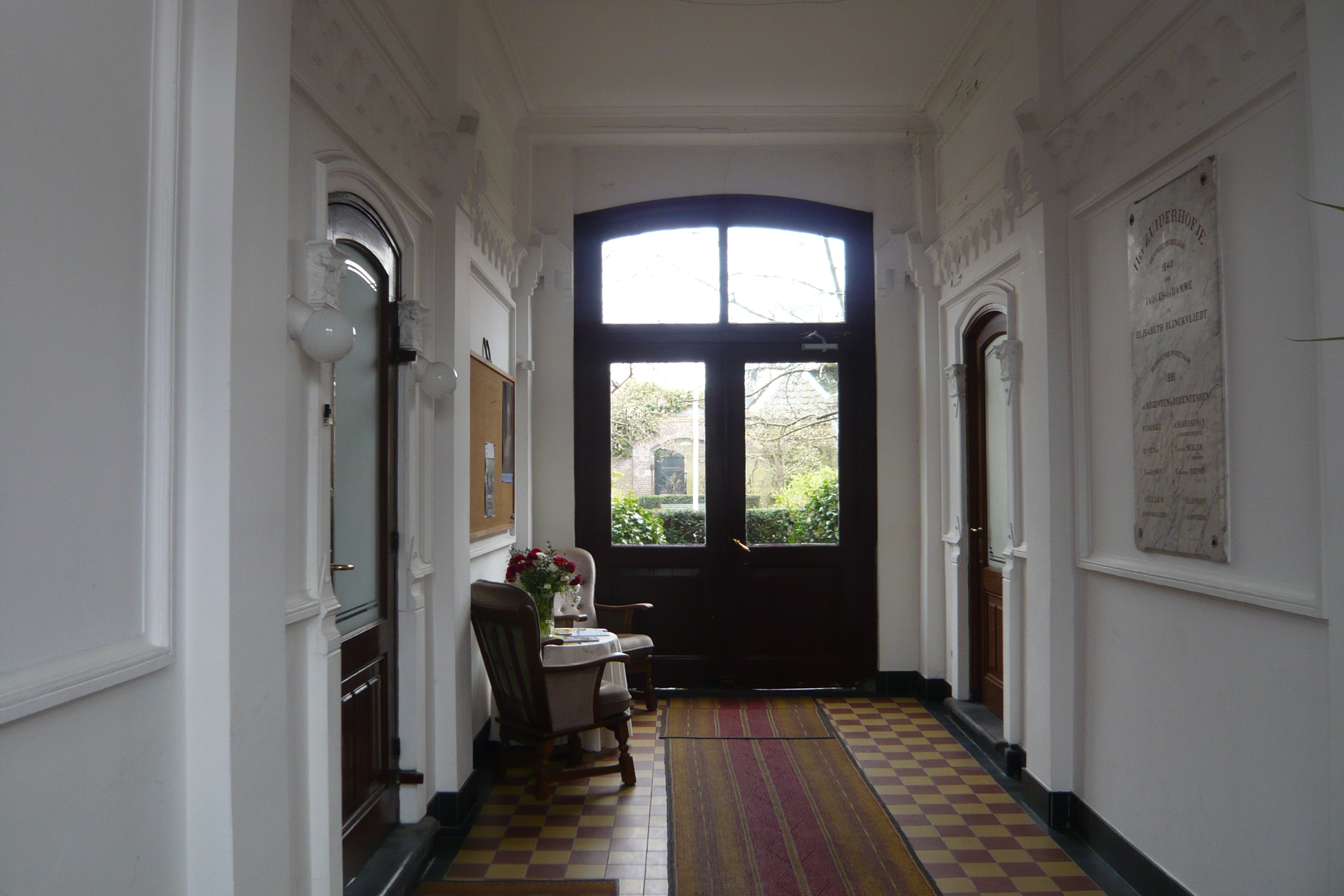
Zuiderhofje entranceway to garden.

The Zuiderhofje is a hofje in Haarlem, Netherlands.

== History ==
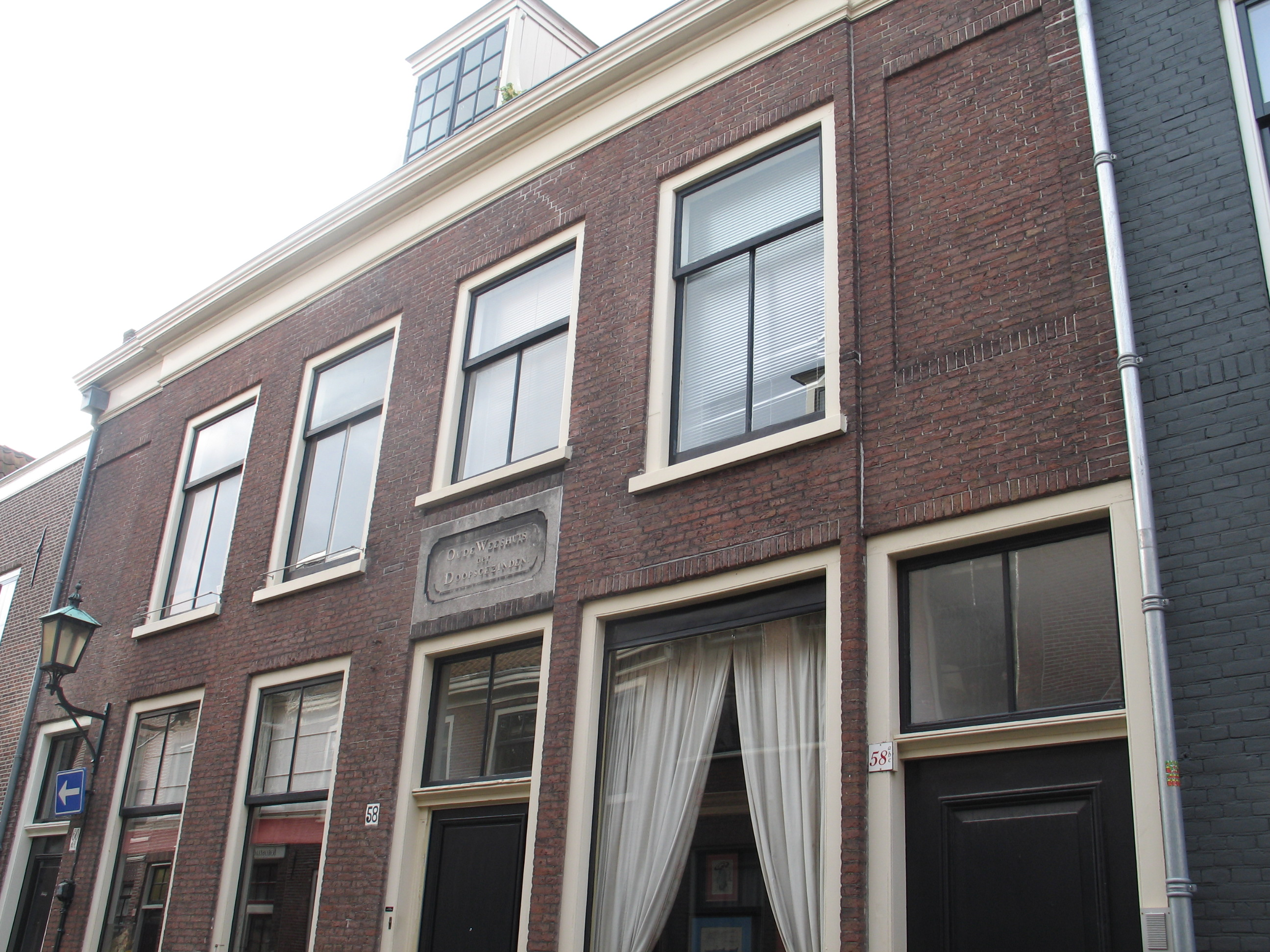
Former Mennonite orphanage on the Klein Heiligland, nr. 58. The keystone is new, and the original is in the Doopsgezinde kerk, Haarlem.

The hofje was founded in 1640 by Jacques van Damme and his wife Elisabeth Blinckvliedt, and is owned by the Mennonite church of Haarlem. The couple gave an order to Michael Slaghreegen on 25 February 1640, to purchase a house on the Zuiderstraat and build a few houses there for elderly women of the Vlaemsche Block, the largest branch of Mennonites in Haarlem at that time. This branch was primarily Flemish in origin, and their church De Olijblock was located on the Klein Heiligland street, near their orphanage, Het Doopsgezinde Weeshuis. The orphanage archives date back to 1634, and its location adjoined the former hofje Blokshofje, that can still be seen, but was sold by the Mennonite church in 1970. A commemorative plaque on the front explains the history of that house.

== Mennonites of Haarlem ==
This hofje is one of four Mennonite hofjes in Haarlem; the others are the Wijnbergshofje in the Barrevoetestraat, the Bruiningshofje on the Botermarkt, and the Blokshofje on the Klein Heiligland sold in 1970. This is not counting the Teylers Hofje, though its founder was Mennonite and its former location had also been a Mennonite hofje. Considering the fact that the Mennonite community was never more than 5% of the Haarlem population, it is unusual that they have always been in the majority among the regents of Haarlem hofjes. The reason is that the Mennonites in Haarlem ran a quarter of all charity work for centuries in Haarlem, until government control slowly took over in the 20th century. The Haarlem archives mention the followers of Zwingli as far back as 1530. The Frisian preacher Menno Simons was not the founder of this faith, but a later leader. This is why the Dutch Mennonites don't call themselves Mennonites, but Doopsgezind, or Anabaptist. Each Doopsgezind group is autonomous. The main rules of the faith in 1640 were:

- Refusal to baptise children until the age of 18
- Refusal to take vows or swear oaths
- Refusal to carry arms

Many Haarlem Mennonites were Flemish immigrants from Menen, in Belgium, who came for the linen trade, but there was also a large group who came from Friesland, and friction between these groups was common. Since most men of influence in Haarlem at that time were members of the schutterij, the only way for influential men of the Mennonite community to advance themselves socially was through social work and cultural donations.

Officially, the Mennonite faith was only tolerated, and not recognized by the Haarlem city council. The Mennonite churches were underground, but its members could move freely in society, just as the Catholics could do after the Protestant Reformation of 1572. The only difference was that they had to pay wachtgeld to avoid the schutterij militia service. The Flemish Mennonites were the strictest followers of their faith. In 1598 a scandal over a bankruptcy caused a schism in the Haarlem Mennonite church, and in 1620 a controversy arose over the question whether a man could fondle his betrothed's breast before marriage. This question split the church, so that at the time of the Hofje's founding, there were 5 Mennonite groups in Haarlem. All of these communities were known for their shunning of members who broke the rules.

== Elisabeth Blinkvliedt ==
After her husband's death in 1642, Elisabeth Blinkvliedt decided to write up a codicil to their bequest of the hofje. Knowing her church well, she stipulated that the hofje regents could act as they saw fit, without any influence of the Mennonite church except that the regents should be members of it. The appointing of regents was only to be done by the current sitting regents, and the business of the hofje was to have no communion with the business of the Mennonite church. She then appointed the sitting group of regents, and these were

- Michael Slaghreegen
- Pieter Joosten Bogaert (he was also the founder of the original hofje in the now Vrouwe- en Antonie Gasthuys hofje)
- Dirk de Wale
- J. de Graeff

She then added a new house and garden to the complex in 1644, and as though this wasn't enough, she also added a new house and garden to the Bruiningshofje in 1647. In the archives of the Bruiningshofje a sum of 150 Carolus guldens is recorded for this purpose, received from Lysbeth van Blenckvliet.

In 1649 she wrote a Memorie, or memoir, in which she asks the regents of this hofje to do a few more things for her after her death. Thanks to this paper we know that she and her husband were the founders of the above-mentioned orphanage in the 1630s, and in her memoir she echoes her stipulation for the hofje that the orphanage should be completely self-supporting, with no interference by the Mennonite church. Her gifts on her death were quite substantial, and are the reason that the hofje was to last for so many centuries, despite later upheavals in the Haarlem Mennonite community.

== Effects of schisms in the church ==
In 1672 the Haarlem Mennonite community was split in two and the Zuiderhofje had to give up a third of its wealth to the Gemeente van Vollenhove. In 1683 the Vlaemsche Block, now merged with the Waterlandsche Gemeente, moved to a new church building in the Frankestraat, where the Haarlem Mennonite community still resides today. In 1685 the hofje was appointed new regents from this united church, which was directly against the wishes of Elisabeth Blinckvliedt. In 1714 this was declared illegal, but in 1716 a final decision was made to allow the church to appoint the regents, and the hofje was declared the property of the church. In 1749 the Mennonite communities rejoined and the old property rights were restored, except that the church kept its (illegal) governance. In 1782 the regents wrote a letter to the church to complain. The church protested that it had made donations to the hofje since 1685. Finally, in 1784, a decision was made to allow the various Mennonite hofjes to exist independently of each other, and independently of the church. The hofjes mentioned were the Winbergshofje and the Zuiderhofje.

== Restoration activities ==
After a glorious period in the 18th and early 19th centuries, thanks to rich donations by regents, the hofje slowly declined. In 1887 the first discussions about restoration began and in 1891 the hofje was completely torn down and rebuilt. In 1892 the elderly women returned to their new homes after a year of living elsewhere. The hofje, together with the Hofje van Gratie, was threatened with destruction in the 1960s when the library was built (located in the old stadsdoelen, or target practise for the city schutterij). In the end only the Hofje van Gratie was torn down. This hofje now stands as an island among newer buildings.

The hofje is for single, senior women.

Address: Zuiderstraat
