= Wijnbergshofje =

Hofje in Haarlem

Coordinates: 52°22′48″N 4°37′48″E

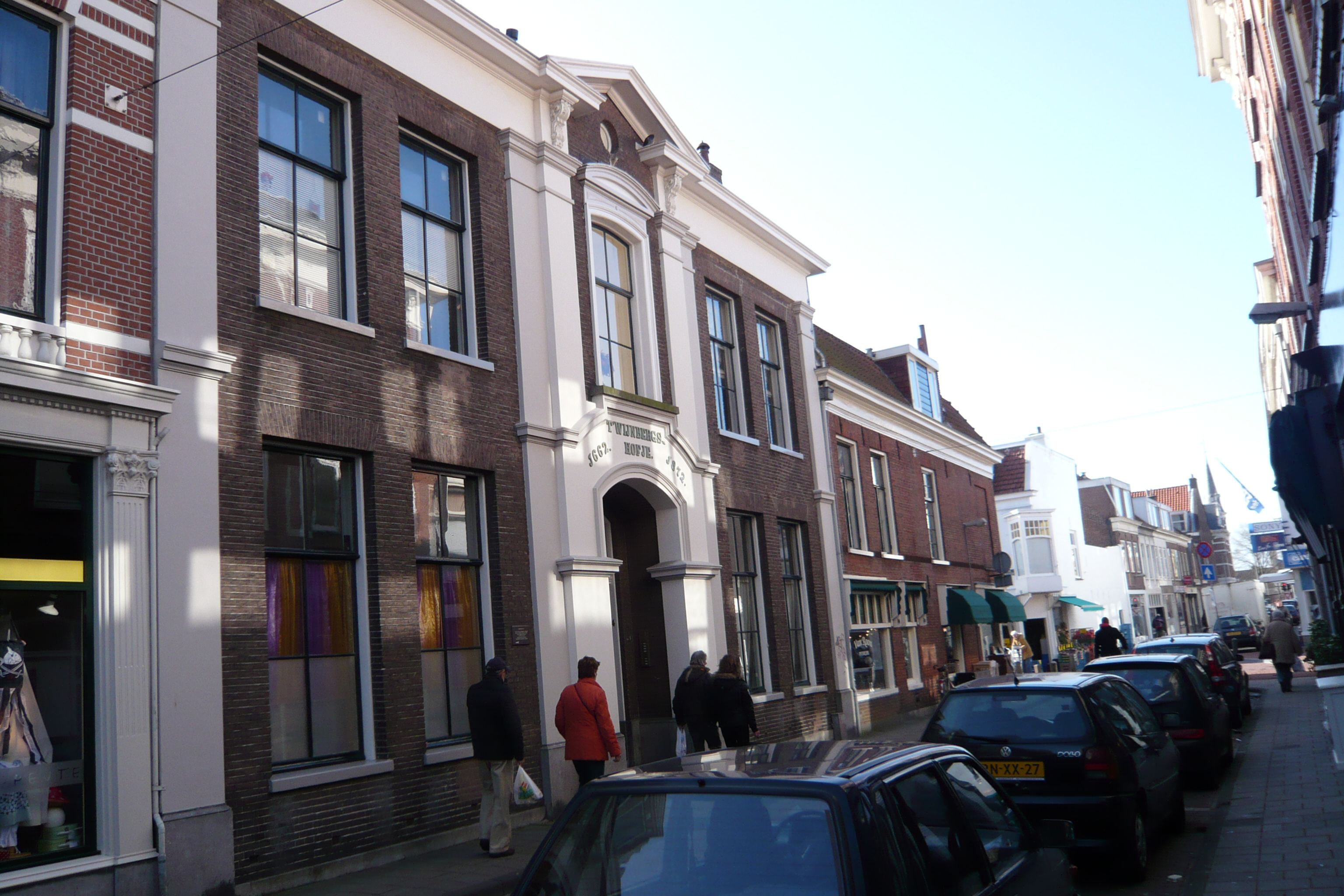
Wijbergshofje in the Barrevoetstraat, across from "Hofje van Loo".

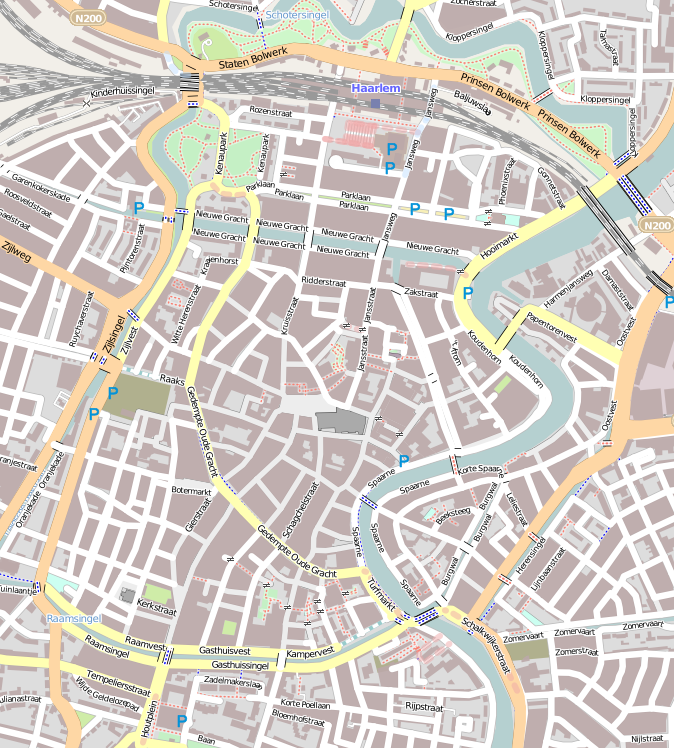
The Hofje van Loo is on the northern side of the street, and the Wijnbergshofje is on the southern side.

The Wijnbergshofje is a hofje in Haarlem, Netherlands, on the Barrevoetstraat.

It was founded in 1662 by the Mennonite Church. It was renovated in 1872 and contains 9 houses for pensioners. This hofje is one of four Mennonite hofjes in Haarlem; the others are the Zuiderhofje in the Zuiderstraat, the Bruiningshofje on the Botermarkt, and the Blokshofje on the Klein Heiligland sold in 1970.

The regents' room located in the back garden has been a national monument in the Netherlands for a long time. In 1999, the 9 houses were also declared a national monument.
