= Hofje =

Dutch word for a courtyard with almshouses around it

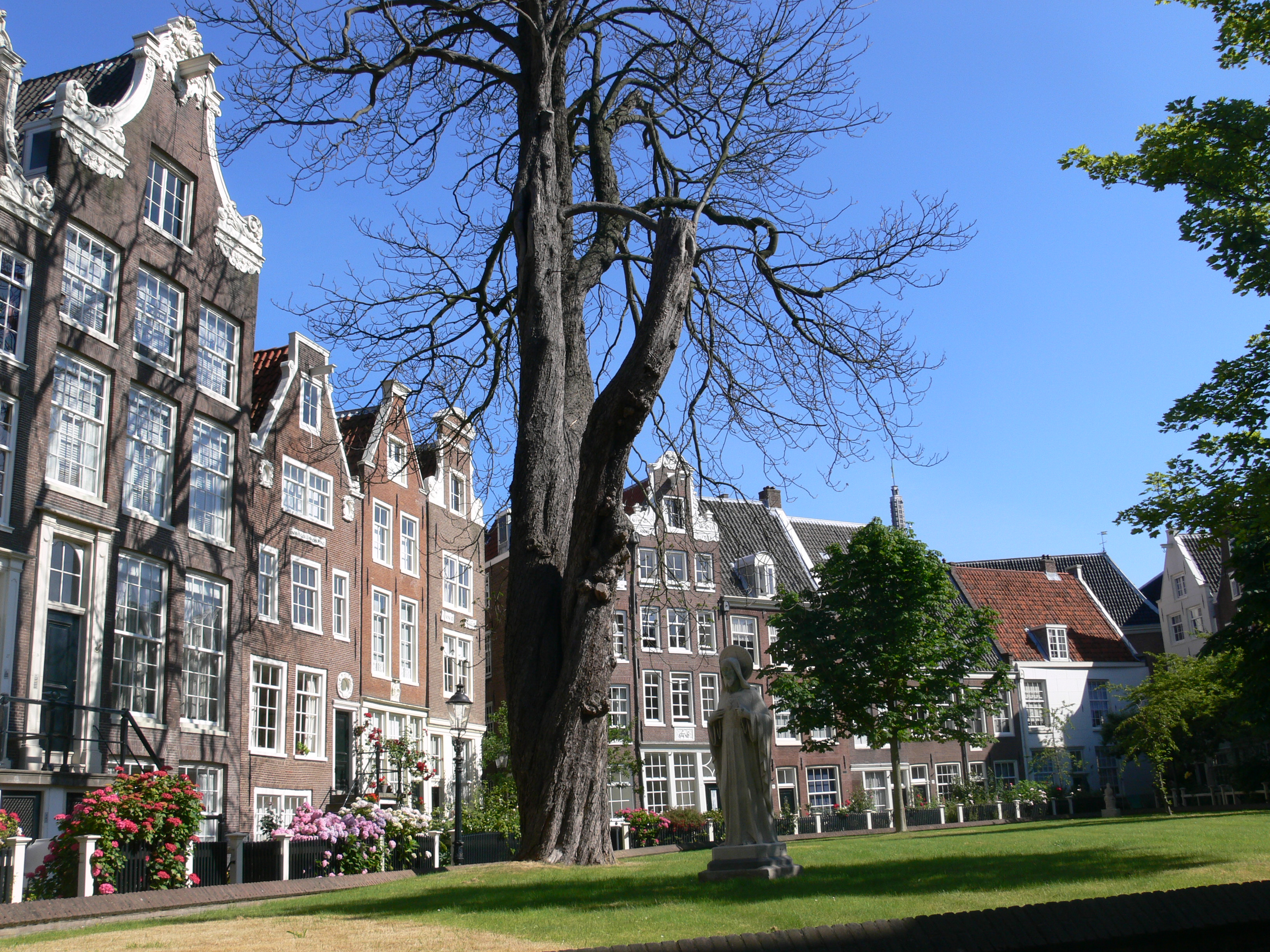
Begijnhof in Amsterdam

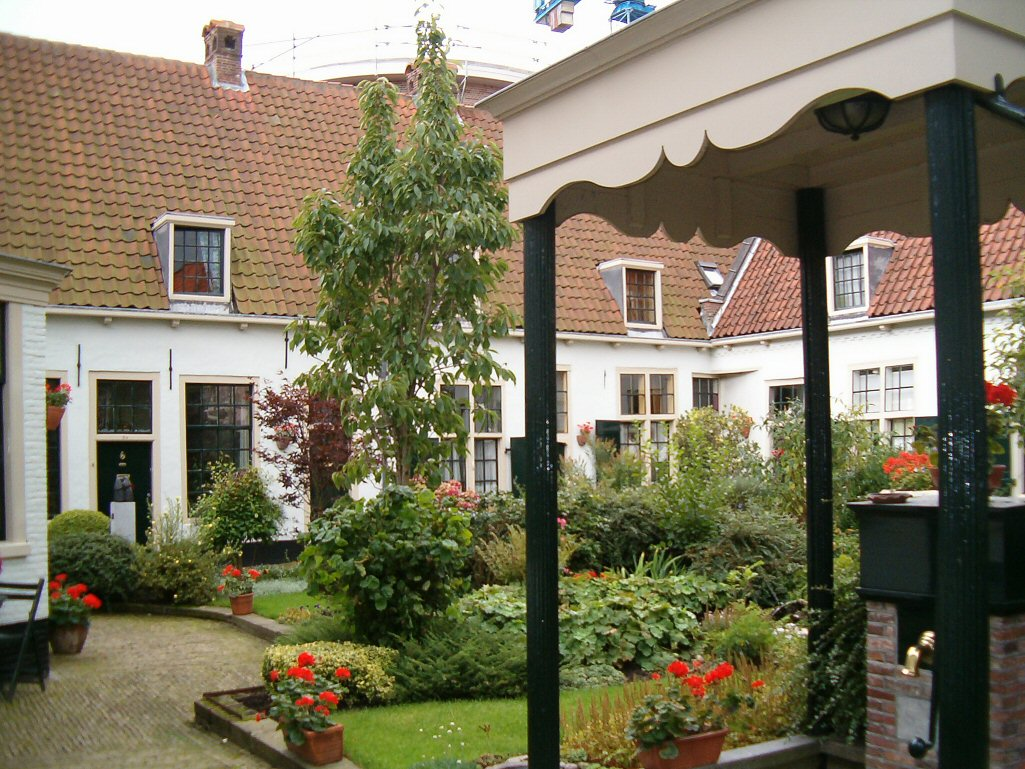
The Hofje van Bakenes, a hofje in Haarlem dating from 1395.

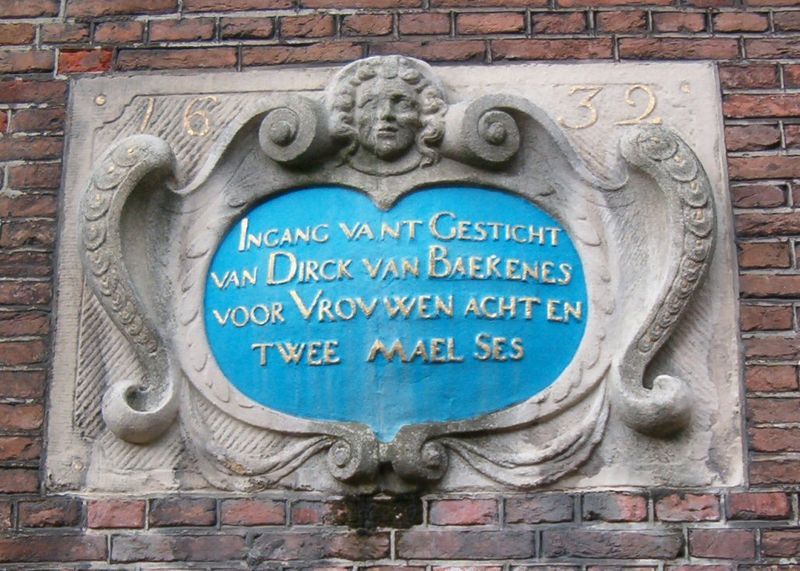
Gablestone of the Hofje van Bakenes in Haarlem

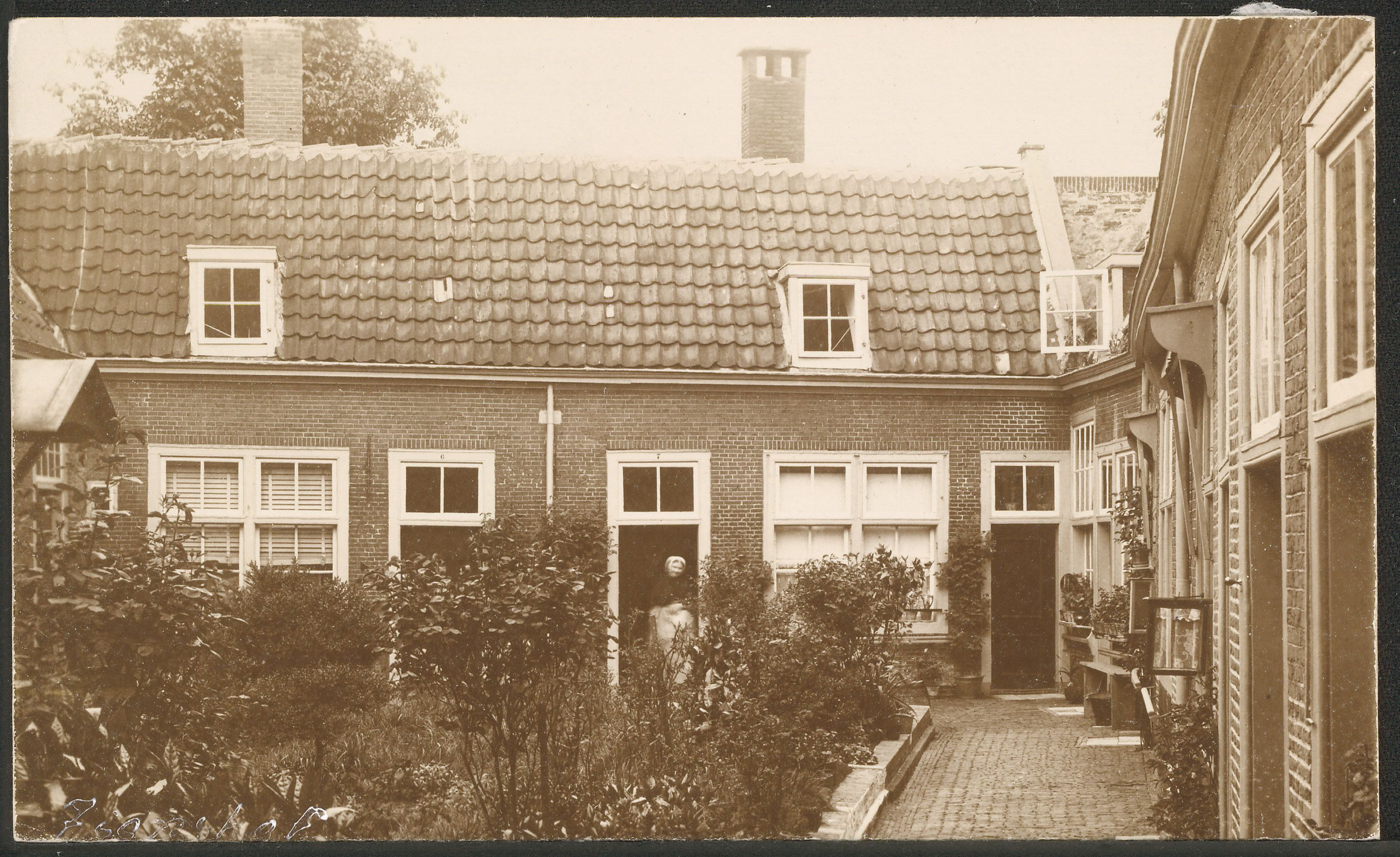
Groot Sionshofje in Leiden (Netherlands), 1860

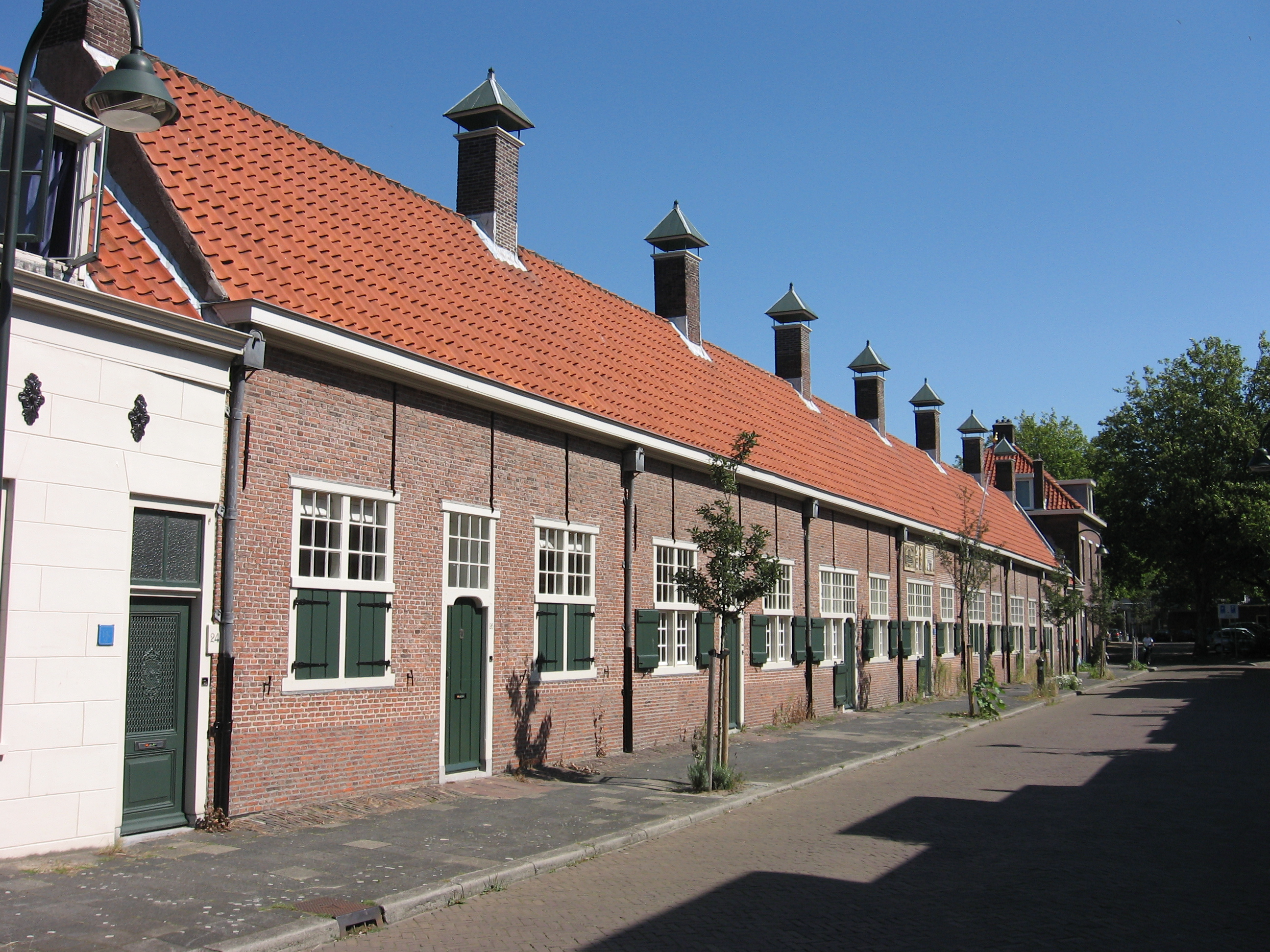
The Hofje van Gratie in Delft

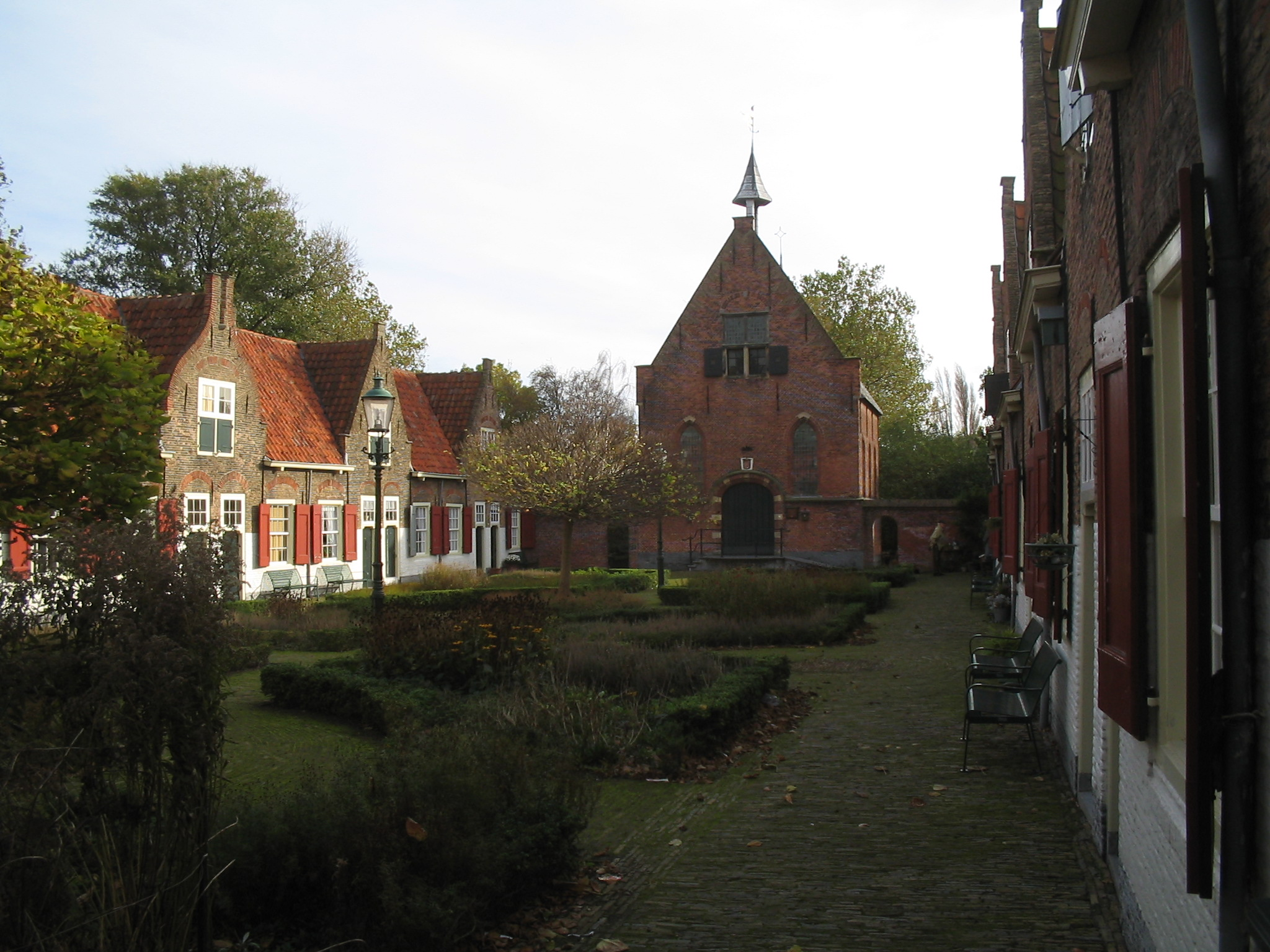
The Geesthof in Naaldwijk

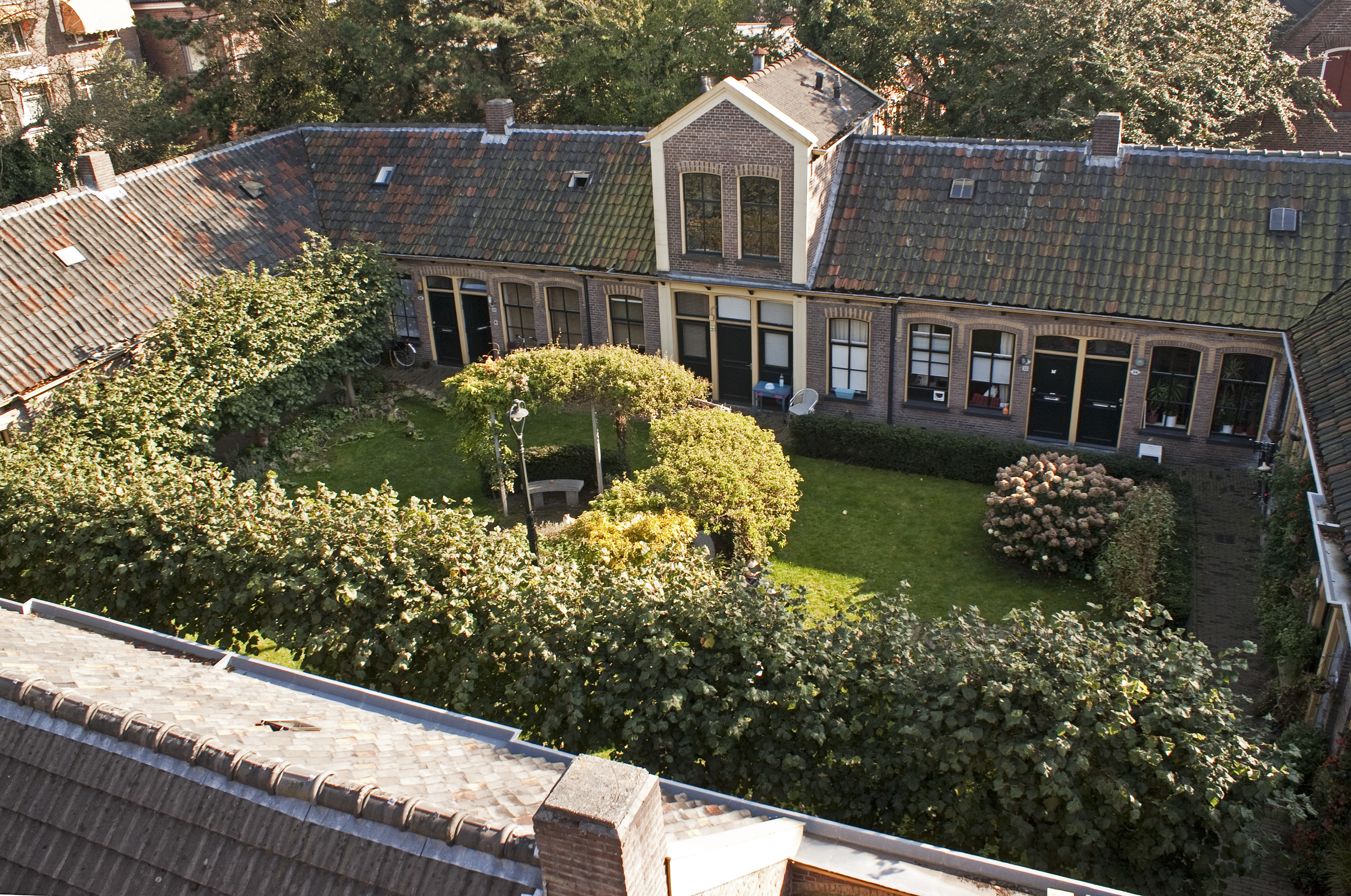
The Middengasthuis in Groningen

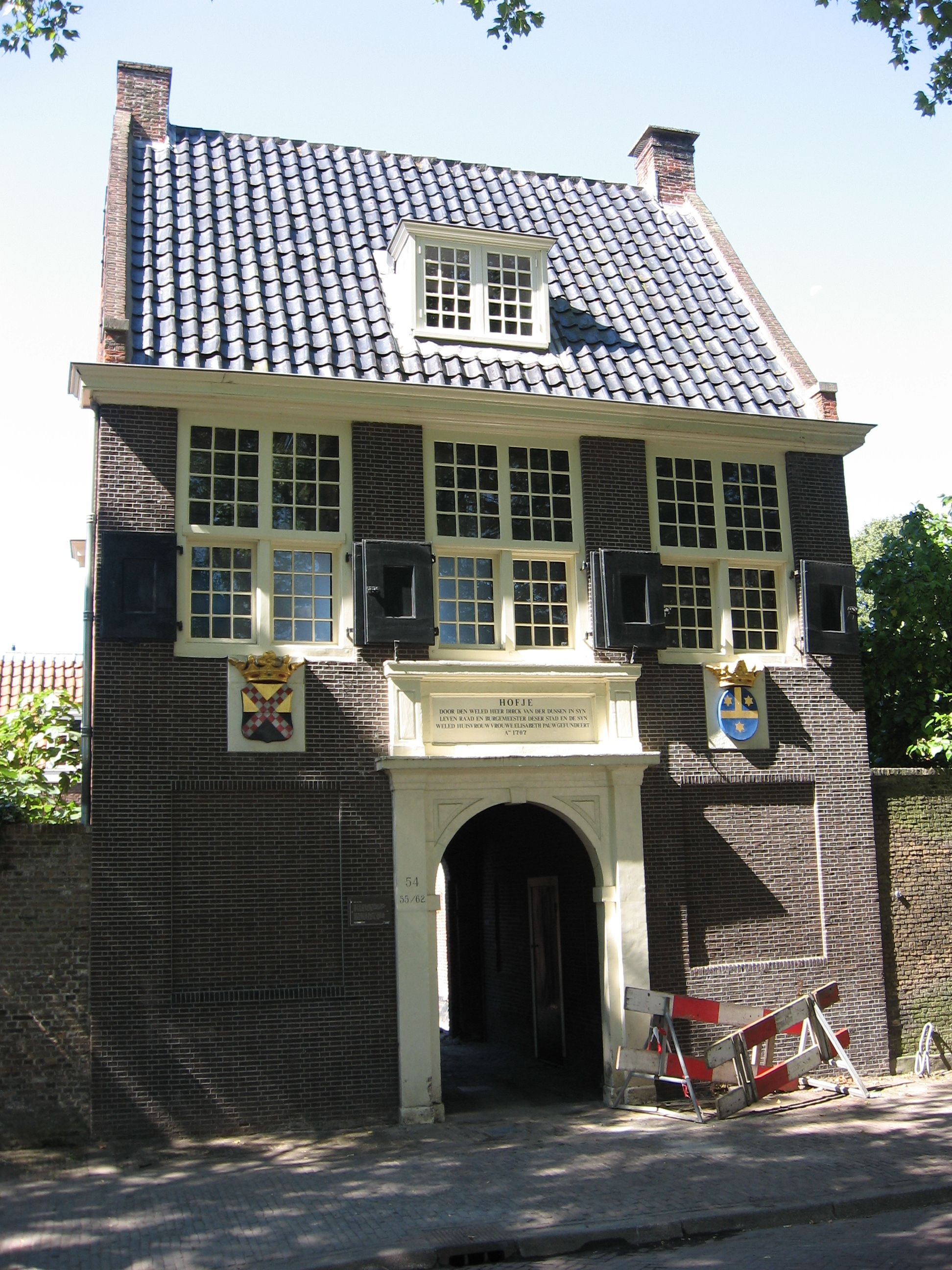
Entrance gate to Hofje van Pauw in Delft

A hofje (diminutive of 'hof', 'court') is a Dutch word for a courtyard with almshouses around it. Hofjes have existed since the Middle Ages.

A hofje provided housing for elderly people (mostly women). They were privately funded and served as a form of social security. In the Netherlands there are still a number of hofjes in use.

Hofjes are usually built in a U-shape with a yard or garden in the middle, and a gate as an entrance. The shape of hofjes was most likely inspired by the (older) Begijnenhofjes—groups of small houses inhabited exclusively by religious women.

A distinction is usually made between the Begijnenhofjes and 'regular' hofjes. The former were used only by (Catholic) women, who supported themselves. They were a kind of cloister. The latter were more charitable institutions.

To be eligible to live in a hofje one had to meet four criteria:

1. Sex: almost all hofjes were founded for women, as they could be relied on to keep a household running; although hofjes for men and married couples did exist
2. Religion: many hofjes were founded for people of the same faith as the founder (some hofjes were founded by church communities)
3. Age: from the 17th century, a minimum age was often used. Fifty years was common, and this was an old age in those years
4. Social-economic background: hofjes were targeted for poorer people

In the 18th century, some hofjes were founded for commercial purposes; the inhabitants would pay rent.

The Hofje van Mevrouw van Aerden in Leerdam is open to visitors as a museum.

Cities with many hofjes in the Netherlands include:

- Alkmaar
- Amsterdam
- Delft
- The Hague
- Groningen
- Haarlem (see Hofjes in Haarlem)
- Leiden
- Utrecht
