= Hofje Codde en Van Beresteijn =

Hofje in Haarlem, Netherlands

Coordinates: 52°22′36″N 4°37′16″E

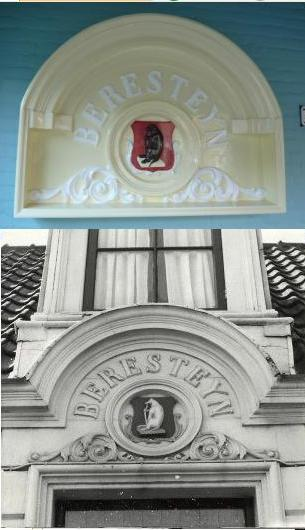
Decoration next to the door of the current hofje, above a picture from when it was above the door in the door in the Lange Molenstraat. That location also had a door on the Lange Herenstraat, Haarlem

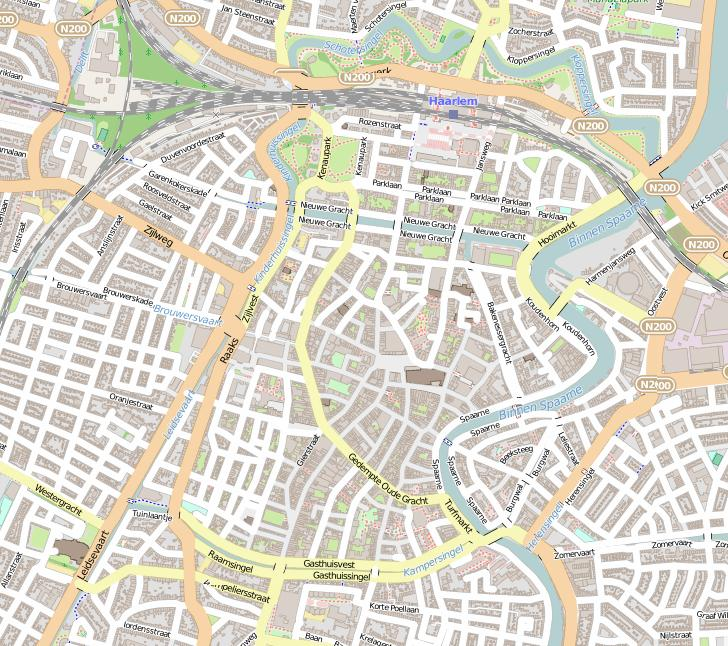
The Hofje today is near the Cathedral of Saint Bavo. The former locations were near the St. Bavochurch and the Haarlem railway station.

The Hofje van Codde en Beresteyn is a hofje in Haarlem, Netherlands. The current building is from 1968 and is located on the J. Cuyperstraat, which is named for the architect who designed the Cathedral of Saint Bavo next door, Joseph Cuypers. This hofje is the wealthiest hofje foundation in Haarlem with the most modern facilities for its inhabitants. Poor (devote) Catholic women of Haarlem 60 years and older are still welcome to live there for free.

== History of the Hofje van Codde ==
The modern-day Hofje van Codde en Berestijn was built in 1968 on land next to the Cathedral of Saint Bavo, because the original donator, Pieter Jansz Codde, was Catholic and built his hofje next to the former cathedral in Haarlem, the Sint-Bavokerk on the Grote markt in the center of town. This location is the second move that the hofje made in its history spanning four centuries.

The Haarlem archives still keep the will and testament of the original donor, where it states that Mr. Pieter Jansz Codde, curate of the (old) Sint-Bavokerk, Grote markt, wrote in 1598 that from the proceeds of his will, four rooms ('‘camerkens’') should be founded “Hofkenswijs” (in the Hofjes way) for poor elderly women. The resulting hofje was built by his executor Hendrick Spoorwater in 1609 on the Nauwe Damsteeg, next to the newly founded underground Catholic church Franciscusstatie (which itself later relocated to the Donkere Spaarne and was called de Vier Heemskinderen). It was the same year that the new poor men's almshouse Oudemannenhuis was completed (now housing the Frans Hals Museum). These two events were related. The Franciscan friars or minnebroers had lost their former monastery in 1581 when the city had reclaimed that land (and the church located there) to replace the St. Elisabeth Gasthuis formerly located on the Grote Houtstraat and which burned in the fire of 1576. These monks were put out on the street, but with local support from underground Catholic parishes, they found a place to stay in the Damsteeg, and many also fled south. Prior to the fall of Haarlem to the Protestant republic in 1577 after the four-year Spanish occupation, many Haarlem hofjes were in some way physically connected to a specific church. This can still be seen in the case of the Lutherse hofje, which has its rooms built up against the church building. In the same way, the original Hofje van Codde was originally attached to the Franciscusstatie. During the course of years it became known as the Spoorwater hofje, because the executor of the Codde testament lived in a much grander house on the corner of the Jansstraat, which housed the regent's room for the hofje.

=== Hillegond Gerritsdr, wealthy nun or klopje ===
Hillegond Gerritsdr, a nun in the Haarlem convent of St. Anna, asked the church for permission to take her possessions from the convent and leave them to this hofje. The St. Anna klooster was located on the same square (damaged beyond repair in 1572) where the Nieuwe Kerk stands today. Like all other convents of Haarlem, the nuns property was seized by the state. In 1581 the Annaklooster was formally seized by the state with all its possessions, and the nuns living there were forced to live elsewhere (they were given an annuity by the city to live by). Her story is much like the story of the nun Elisabeth Verhagen of the Haarlem St. Michielsklooster, who suffered a similar fate. The grounds of that cloister became the Proveniershuis. Hillegond Gerritsdr had her portrait painted by Maarten van Heemskerck with rosary in hand. This portrait hung in the regent's room for centuries, up until the move to the J. Cuyperstraat. Since then it has been on loan to the Frans Hals Museum. Her portrait is the only tangible evidence today of the lifestyle of the nuns of the St. Annaklooster.

=== Spoorwater ===
Nothing remains of the original hofje in the center of town. During the course of centuries, the successful hofje (known as Spoorwater's hofje) expanded and rebuilt, but in the 18th century, the Joh. Enschedé type foundry company slowly swallowed up all buildings between the Sint-Bavo-kerk and the Teylers Museum. The original hofje was built on the Damsteeg directly behind the clock tower (in 2005 rebuilt on the Klokhuisplein), and comprised buildings from the Statie St. Franciscus, all the way along the Nauwe Damsteeg to the Lange Begijnestraat, where Spoorwater lived. The Nauwe Damsteeg and the Dam steeg no longer exist today, but in the recently finished former Enschede complex, the clock tower has been rebuilt, and there is now a new open space above the parking garage, called the Simon de Vrieshof on the same spot. On old maps of Haarlem, the original hofje appears in legends as Het Spoorwaters Hofje. It is formally called Stichting Het Hofje van Meester Pieter Janszoon Codde, genaamd Spoorwater, probably because Hendrick Spoorwater not only was the first regent, but he lived there until he died. Also, Mr. Codde was asked to leave his will to a hofje by the Protestant city councilmen, and it is not clear if he voluntarily left this bequest or not. Perhaps Spoorwater was the more energetic overseer, since building was completed before Codde died in 1610. In any case, being Catholic has always been one of the entrance criteria for this hofje, and even today the members of the hofje do not have to walk far to go to mass.

== History of the Hofje van Beresteyn ==
The Codde hofje merged later with the Hofje van Beresteyn, which was founded in 1684, nearly a century later, by the painter Claes van Beresteyn. Claes van Beresteyn was a friend of the Haarlem painter Pieter Soutman who was a regent. The family portrait of the Beresteyns that was later sold as a Frans Hals in the 1880s is now attributed to Soutman.

The two hofjes had always been run by the same board of regents, but merged their books in 1731. The Hofje van Nicolaas van Beerensteyn was originally built on the Lange Herenstraat at a spot now housing a large parking garage across from the Haarlem railway station.

Both Hofjes are for elderly Catholic women, though Nicolaes van Beresteyn stipulated in his will that his hofje was for both elderly men and women. The hofje seems very unassuming in its current location in the shadow of the Cathedral of Saint Bavo, but it happens to be the wealthiest of all the hofjes in Haarlem. This is because the families of van Codde and van Beresteyn left several paintings that were sold in the 19th century for funding to rebuild, which they did.

== The wealthy van Beresteyn family ==
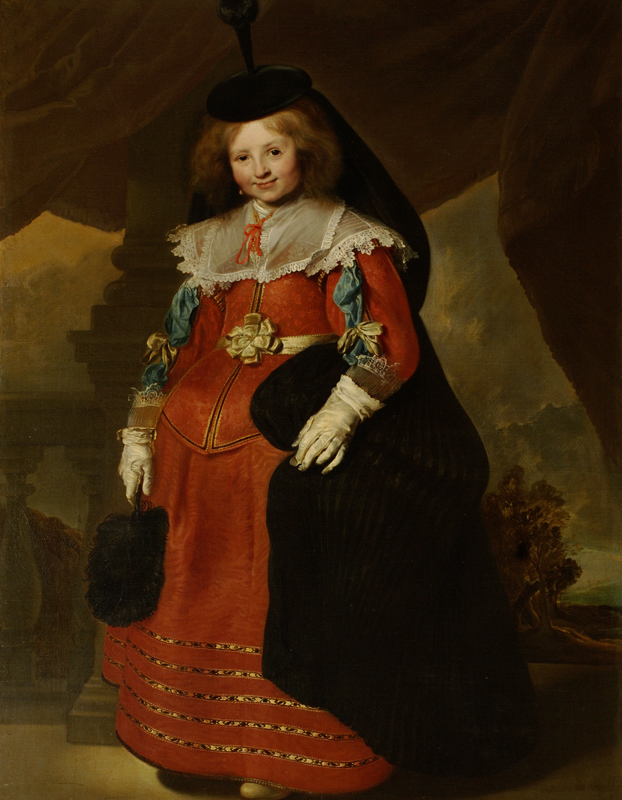
Emerantia van Beresteyn, by Pieter Soutman in 1634. This painting was sold as a Frans Hals to Mathilde Rothschild.

The largest influx of capital for the hofje came about when the regents sold a Frans Hals painting to Mathilde Hannah Rothschild in 1882 and later three more Frans Hals paintings to the Louvre in 1885. The first painting was a portrait of a young girl, Emerantia van Beresteyn, the sister of the landscape painter Nicolaes van Beresteyn, the later founder of half of this hofje. The next two were twin marriage portraits from 1629 of Nicolaes' parents Catharina Both van der Eem and Paulus van Beresteyn (1588–1636). Finally, they sold a family portrait about 10 years after that, which was attributed to Frans Hals at the time, but has since been attributed to Pieter Soutman. The Rothschild painting caused a scandal in the Dutch papers and the hofje was accused of selling National treasure for financial gain. The hofje had copies made of the paintings by Petrus Theodorus van Wijngaerdt which still hang in the regent's room today.

== The Hofje today ==
The current building is from 1968 and is located on the J. Cuyperstraat, near the church and the canal Leidsevaart, in Haarlem. Catholic women 60 years and older are still welcome there.

== The wealth of the foundation today ==
The management of the Hofje is in charge of a board that works together with the St Jacobsgodhuis to finance various activities in Haarlem's hofjes, such as the Johan Enschedé Hof, Gravinnehof and work on the Frans Loenenhofje. Current projects include studies to discover how the age-old forms of community living in hofjes can withstand the modern age.
