= Catharina Both-van der Eem =

Painting by Frans Hals

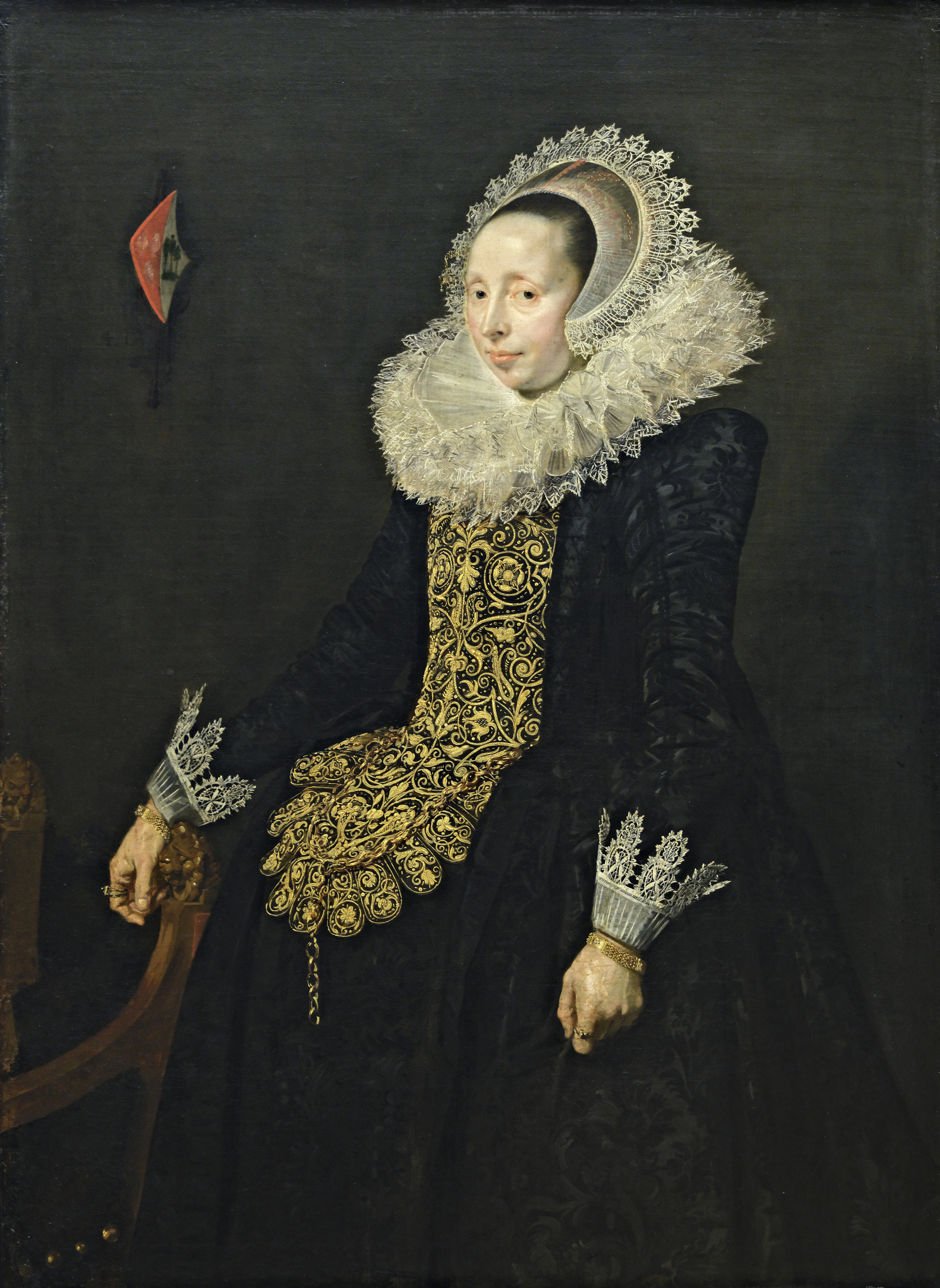
- Catharina Both van der Eem, c. 1620, Oil on canvas, 137 x 100 cm
- Artist: Frans Hals
- Year: 1620
- Catalogue: Hofstede de Groot, Catalog 1910: #155
- Medium: Oil on canvas
- Dimensions: 137 cm × 100 cm (54 in × 39 in)
- Location: Louvre Museum, Paris
- Accession: RF 425

Catharina Both van der Eem is a painting by the Dutch Golden Age painter Frans Hals, painted in 1620 and now in Louvre Museum. It is considered a pendant portrait to the Portrait of Paulus van Beresteyn, in the same museum.

== Painting ==
Similar to Hals' Portrait of a Woman Standing in Chatsworth House, this woman is wearing a wedding ring on her right forefinger, a figure-eight collar and lace wrist collars with gold bracelets. Her bodice is a richly embroidered Dutch wedding stomacher, and a heavy gold chain draped through a vlieger, rests on a wheel-shaped fardegalijn. Her diadem cap lacks wings and is more similar to the cap worn by Hals's unknown sitter Portrait of a Woman Standing (Kassel) and by his brewer Aletta Hannemans. Her portrait was documented by Hofstede de Groot in 1910, who wrote:

155. CATHARINA BOTH VAN DER EEM, wife of Paulus Beresteyn. B. 10. M. 16. Three-quarter-length, life size. She is turned three-quarters left. She wears a lace cap, and a ruff trimmed with lace. She has a black dress with lace insertion in front and lace wristbands. Her left hand grasps her dress; her right rests on the back of a chair. In the left-hand top corner is her coat of arms. [Pendant to 154.] Inscribed, "AETA. SVAE 40 1629."; canvas, 54 inches by 40 inches. Purchased from the Hofje van Beresteyn, Haarlem, 1884, for the Louvre (100,000 francs, with 154 and the Beresteyn family group). In the Louvre, Paris, 1902 catalogue, No. 2387.

Hofstede de Groot identified it as a pendant to

154. PAULUS VAN BERESTEYN (June 15, 1588-December 27, 1636). B. 9; M. 15. Three-quarters length, life size. He is in profile to the right, but the head is seen in a three-quarter view. He wears a black flowered costume, with a white lace collar like a ruff and lace wristbands. He presses his right hand to his side and leans his left

hand, which holds his hat, on a table. In the right-hand top corner are

the family arms. [Pendant to 155.] The first numeral in the age has been altered in the inscription below to 4, and the last numeral in the date to 9. It would be better to read 30 and 1620. The style of painting, which is similar to that of the earliest groups of marksmen at Haarlem (431-3), makes the date 1620 probable. Inscribed, "AETAT. SVAE. 40. 1629."; canvas, 54 inches by 40 inches. See Moes, Iconographia Batava, No. 519, 2. Purchased from the Hofje van Beresteyn, Haarlem, 1884, for the Louvre (100,000 francs, with 155 and the Beresteyn family group). In the Louvre, Paris, 1902 catalogue, No. 2386.

In 1974 Seymour Slive listed both paintings as pendants of each other and confirmed the Hals attribution, which had been called into question in 1970. Slive agreed with the traditional date of 1629 but felt that it could have been painted soon after the couple's marriage in 1619 as documented by E.A. van Beresteyn. He agreed with Numa S. Trivas that it was painted by Hals and not as some claimed, by Pieter Soutman. In 1989 Claus Grimm agreed with both earlier conclusions about the portrait of Paulus, but felt that Catharina's portrait was painted by Soutman.

== Pendants ==
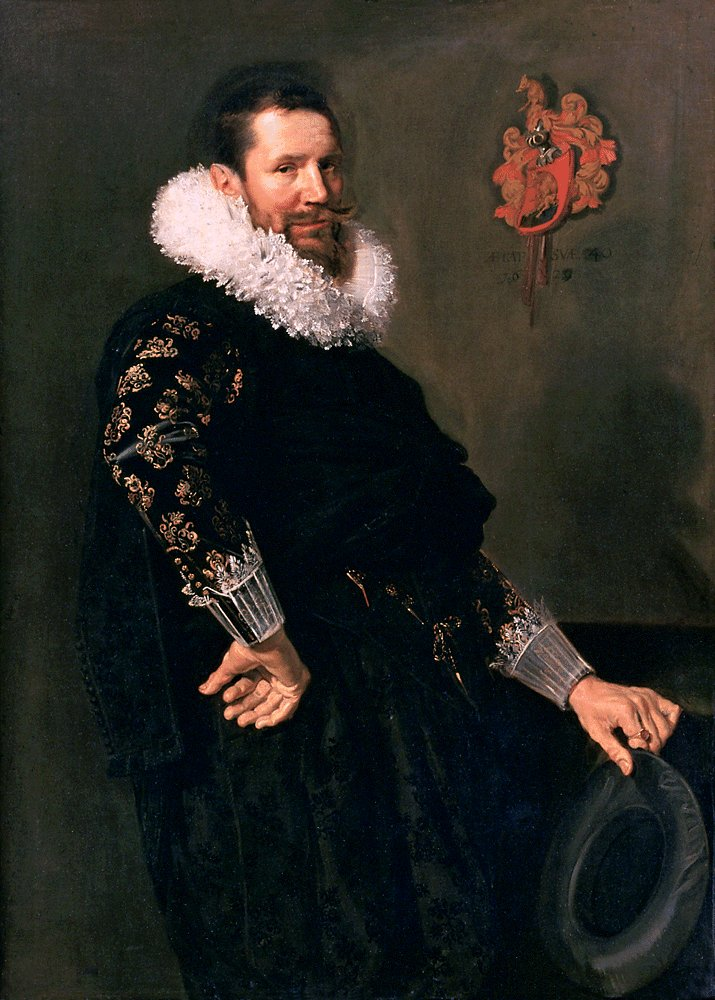

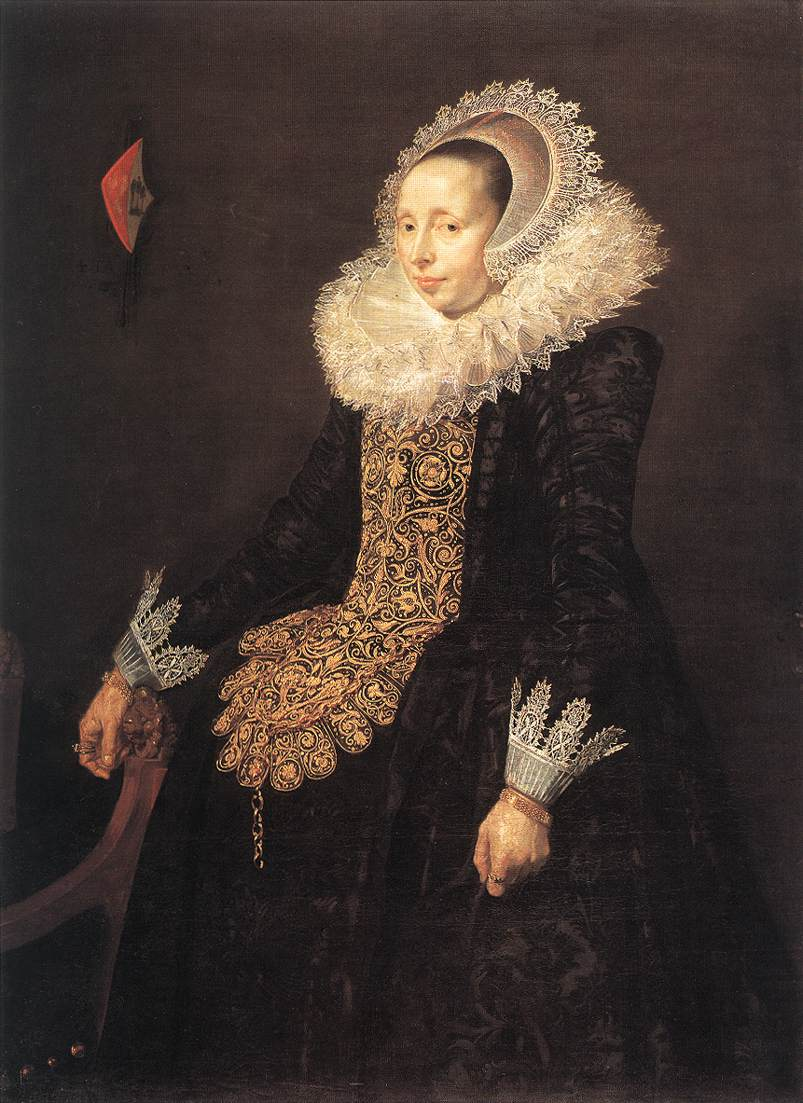

== See also ==
- List of paintings by Frans Hals
