= Trivas =

Trivas is a surname. Notable people with the surname include:

- Numa S. Trivas (1899–1942), American art historian and collector
- Victor Trivas (1896–1970), Russian screenwriter and film director
