= Paulus van Beresteyn =

Dutch lawyer (1582–1666)

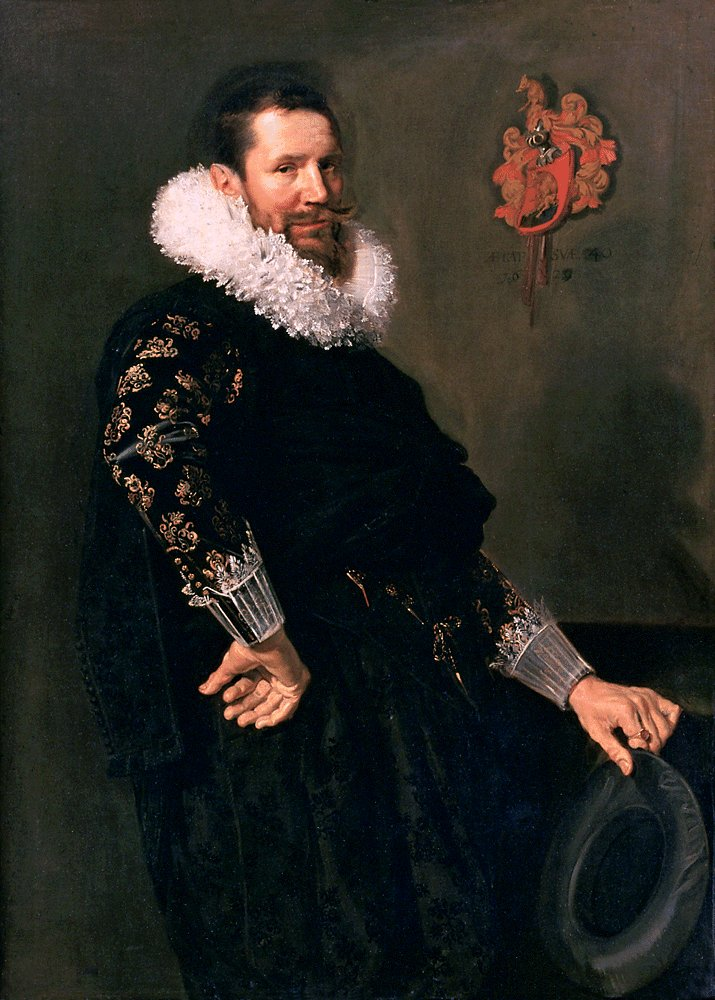
Paulus van Beresteyn in 1619 by Frans Hals

Paulus van Beresteyn (1582 – 1666), was a Dutch lawyer in Haarlem, known best today for his portrait painted by Frans Hals in 1619.

== Biography ==
He was a lawyer in Haarlem who lived first on the Wijngaardstraat, and later on the Zijlstraat. He rented the house on the Wijngaardstraat from the heirs of Arnout van Beresteyn (1556-1612), a family relation. During the years 1615-1617 he was commissioner of the court of justice in Haarlem. He first married Elisabeth Sybrands. She died and in 1618 he married a second time to Anna van Steyn, who died less than a year later, probably in childbirth. Catharina Both van der Eem, who was his third wife, had her portrait made to match his marriage portrait, when they married in Leiden op 12 December 1619. Because later historians have attributed Catharina's pendant to Pieter Soutman, it is unclear whether this portrait was first prepared by Hals, whose portrait of Paulus matches the pendant in many respects. Catharina also features in the Beresteyn family portrait, which includes their daughter Emerantia and son Claes.

All of these portraits hung in the Hofje van Beresteyn thanks to their son Claes who founded it.

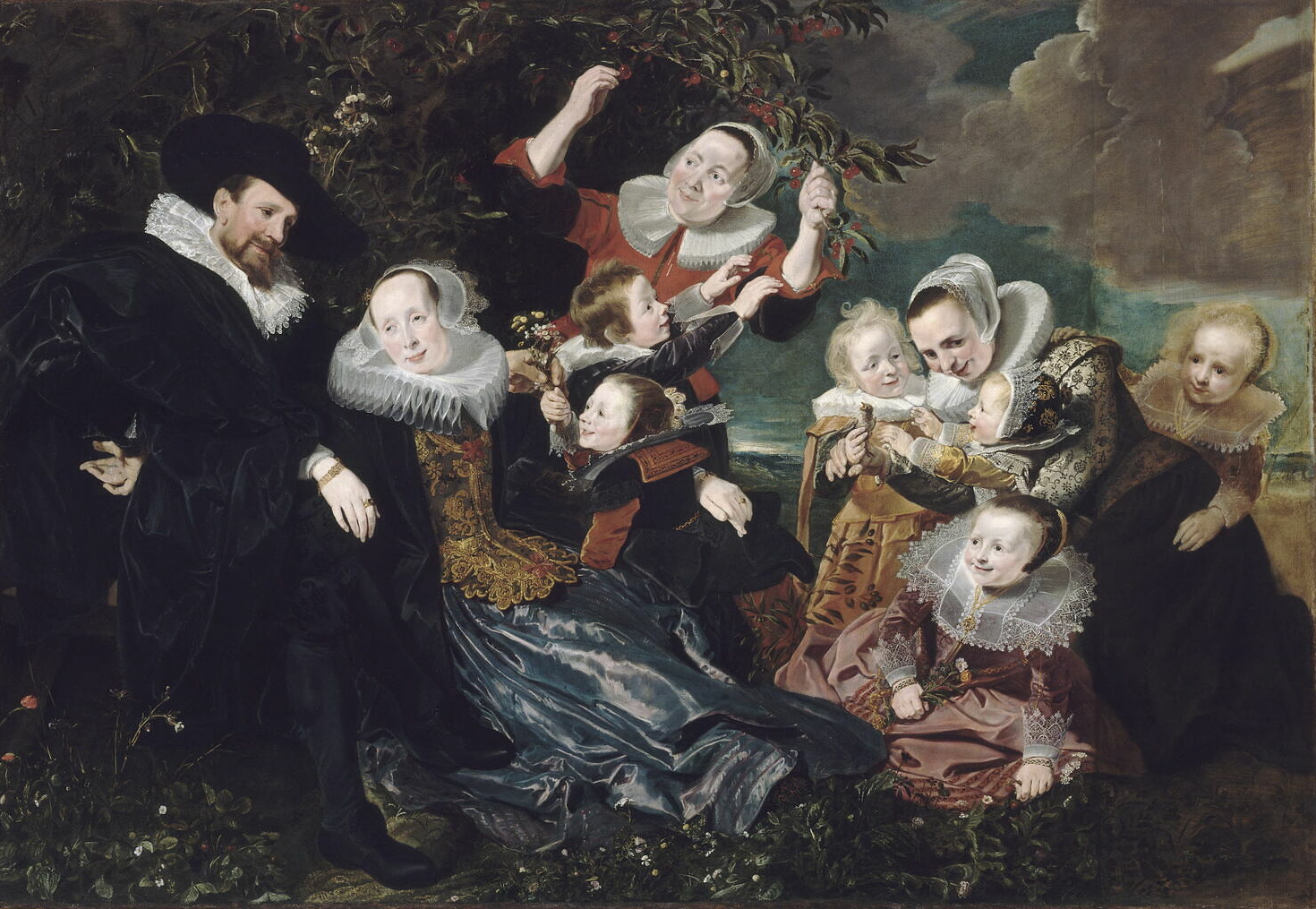
The Beresteyn family in 1635, now attributed to Pieter Soutman

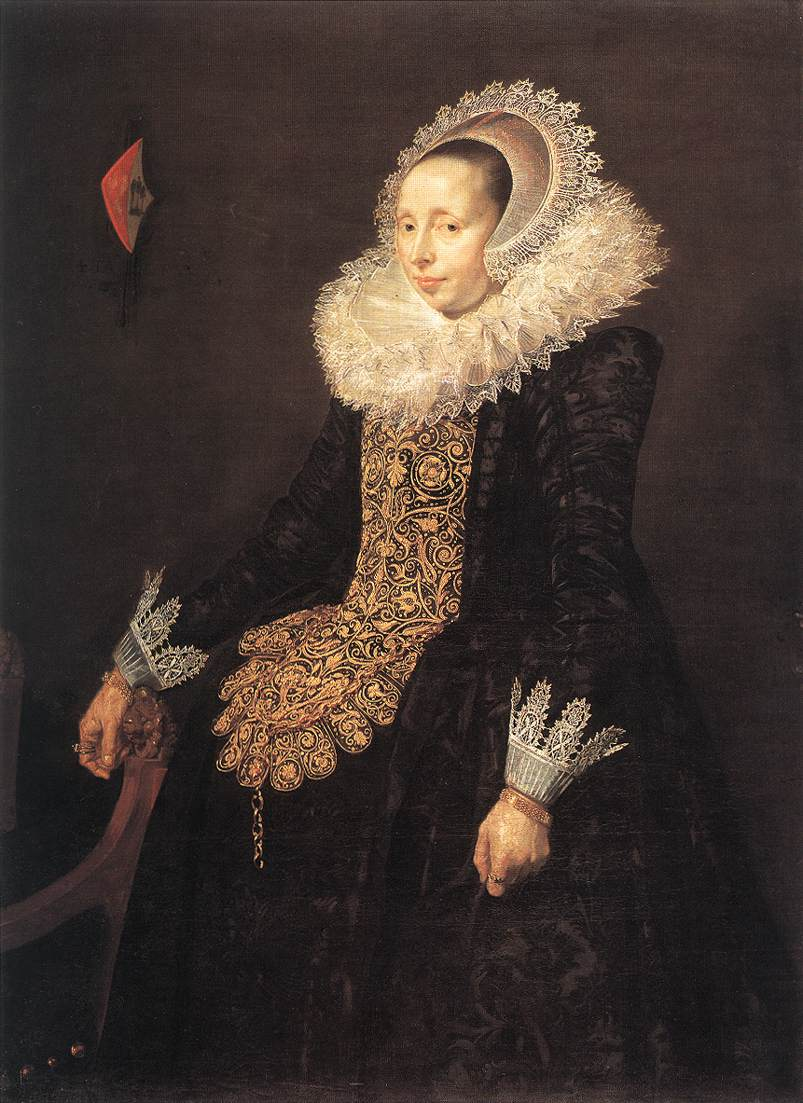
Beresteyn's third wife Catharina Both van der Eem, variously attributed to Hals and Soutman

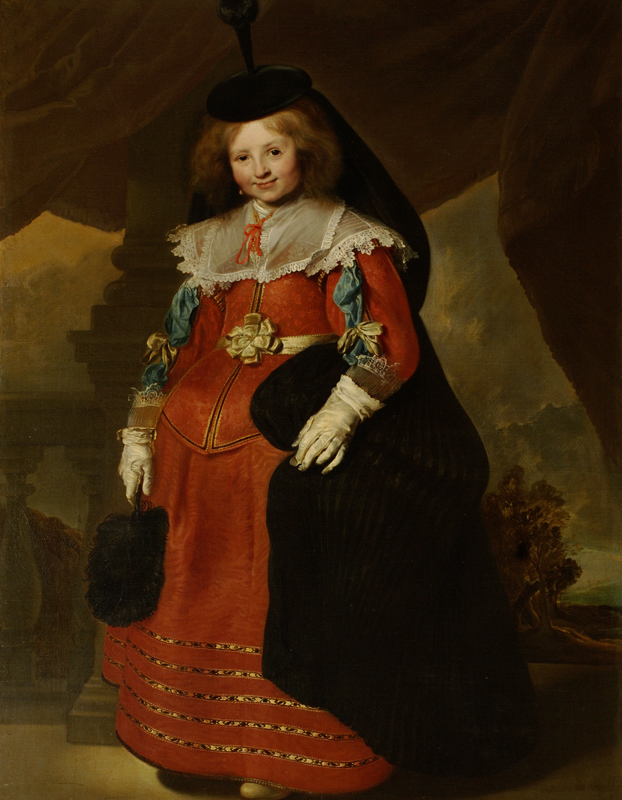
Beresteyn's daughter Emerantia in 1634, now attributed to Soutman
