= Claes van Beresteyn =

Dutch Golden Age landscape painter

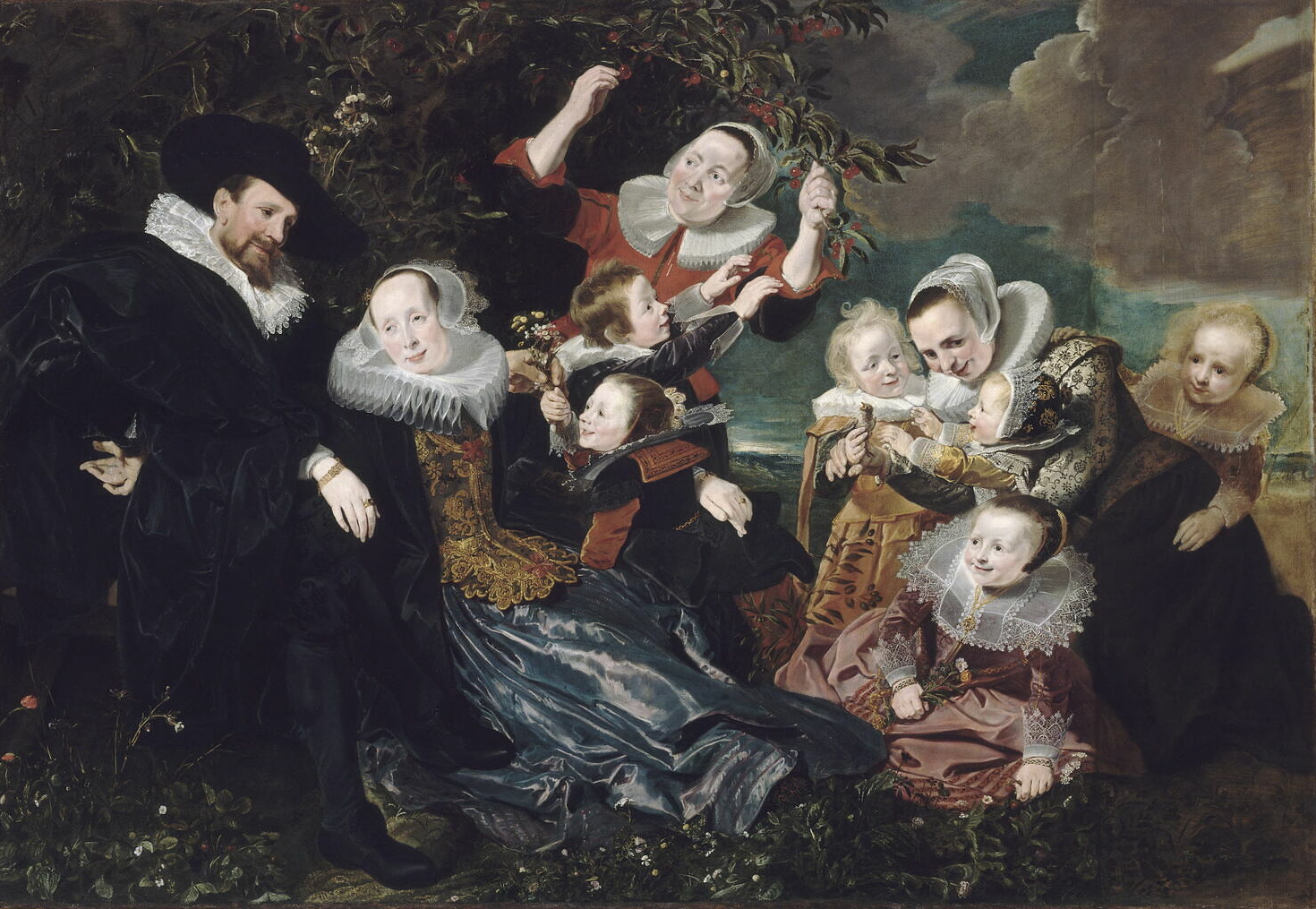
Claes van Beresteyn painted in an extra attachment on the right (c. 1635) in a group portrait of the Beresteyn family from 1630

Claes van Beresteyn (1627–1684), was a Dutch Golden Age landscape painter who founded a hofje in his hometown of Haarlem.

== Biography ==
He was born in Haarlem as the youngest of 6 children of the lawyer Paulus van Beresteyn and his third wife Catharina van der Eem. His portrait as a child was added to the family portrait in a long swathe of canvas on the right hand side. This canvas was later sold in the 19th century to the Louvre as a Frans Hals painting, though later analysis by art historians have since disputed its attribution to Pieter Soutman. On 5 January 1644 he became a member of the Haarlem Guild of St. Luke as a pupil of Salomon de Bray and became an etcher and landscape painter in the manner of Cornelis Vroom and Adriaen Hendriksz Verboom. His sister Elisabeth married his friend, the horse painter Pieter Cornelisz Verbeeck, who also painted a portrait of Claes. His brother Arnold also became a painter and in 1637 had been a pupil of Willem Heda. Arnold died young and no works survive.

Claes never married and lived in the house of his parents in the Zijlstraat, where he drew up his will on 18 June 1677 with the notary Gellinckhuizen to create a hofje for 12 elderly Catholic women.

== Works ==
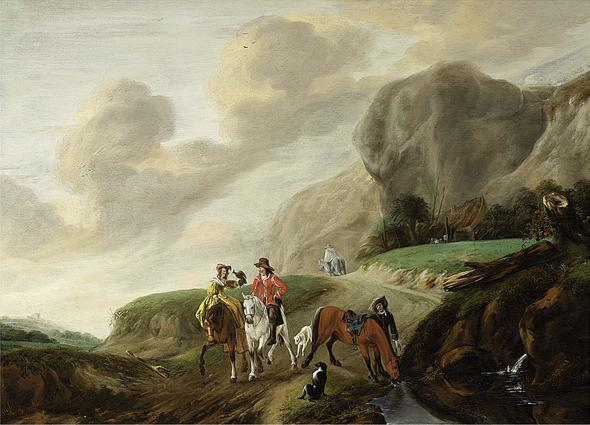
Falcon hunt

According to the RKD he was influenced by Jacob van Ruisdael. He is known for prints and landscapes with horsemen. The Rijksmuseum has a series of etchings by his hand.

== Legacy ==
He died in Haarlem and his testament founding the Hofje van Beresteyn that he had drawn up in 1677 was executed in his name in 1684. The hofje was built on the Heerenstraat and was later merged with the Hofje van Codde to form the Hofje Codde en Van Beresteijn. Though he had been a Catholic, Claes van Beeresteyn was buried in St. Bavochurch.
