= Portrait of a Woman Standing (Kassel) =

Painting by Frans Hals

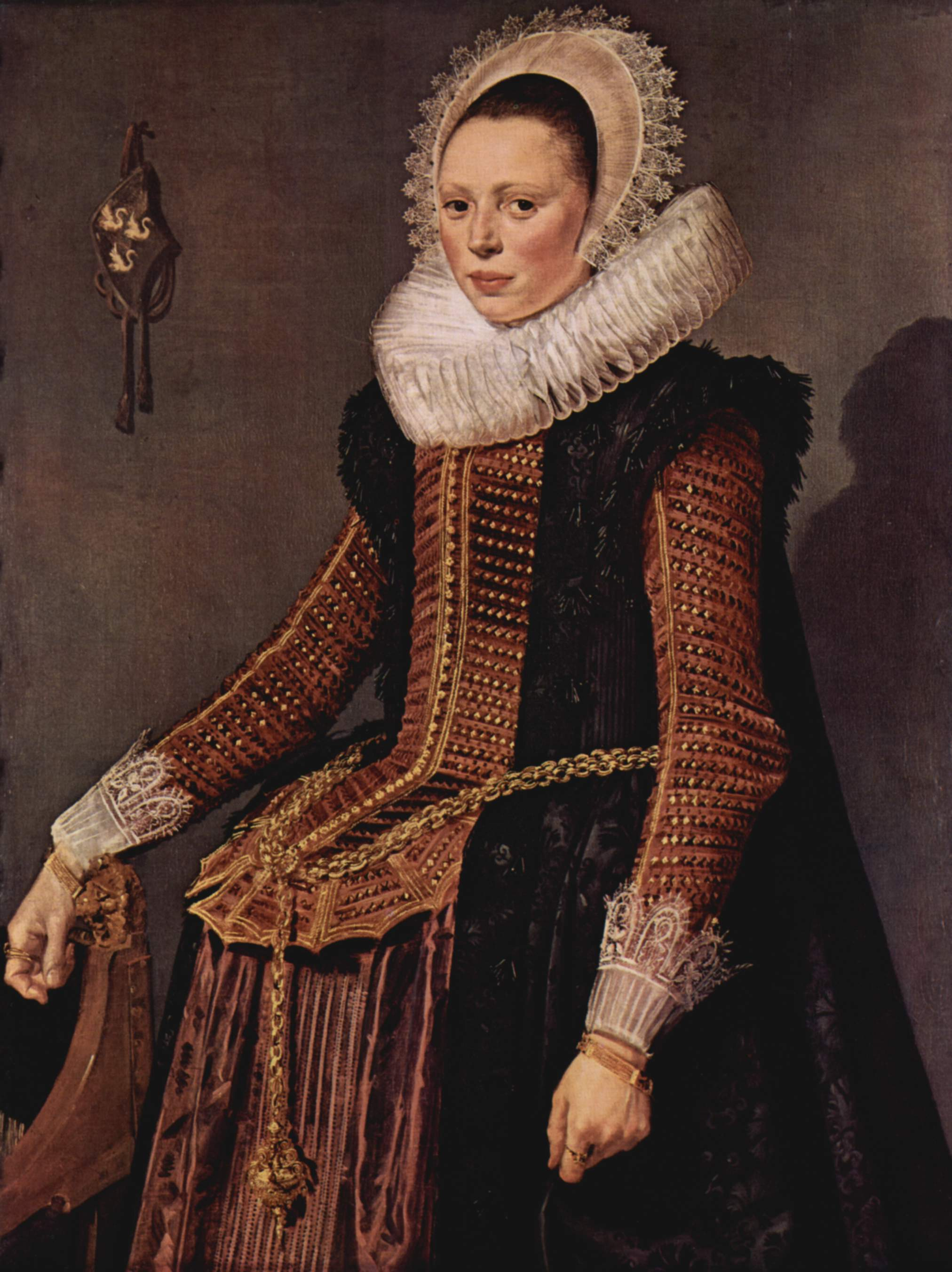
- Portrait of a Woman Standing, c. 1618 – 1620, Oil on panel, 106 x 80.3 cm
- Artist: Frans Hals
- Year: 1618-1620
- Catalogue: Hofstede de Groot, Catalog 1910: #374
- Medium: Oil on panel
- Dimensions: 103 cm × 82.5 cm (41 in × 32.5 in)
- Location: Gemäldegalerie Alte Meister (Kassel); Kassel
- Accession: 214

Portrait of a Woman Standing (Kassel) is a painting by the Dutch Golden Age painter Frans Hals, painted in 1618–1620 and now in Gemäldegalerie Alte Meister (Kassel). It is considered a pendant portrait to the Portrait of a Man Standing, in the same museum.

== Painting ==
Similar to Hals' Portrait of a Woman Standing in Chatsworth House, this woman is wearing a wedding ring on her right forefinger, a figure-eight collar and lace wrist collars over sleeves that match her bodice, and a heavy gold chain draped through a vlieger over a wheel-shaped fardegalijn. Her diadem cap lacks wings however and is more similar to the cap worn by Hals's Catholic sitter Catharina Both-van der Eem and by his brewer Aletta Hannemans. Despite the coat-of-arms, this sitter remains unidentified and her portrait was documented by Hofstede de Groot in 1910, who wrote:

374. PORTRAIT OF A WOMAN STANDING. B. 100. She looks about thirty years of age. Three-quarter-length. She is turned three-quarters left, and looks at the spectator. Her left arm hangs at her side, the hand grasping the seam of her dress; her right hand rests on the back of a chair. She wears a lace cap, a ruff, a shiny silk dress, a jacket of lacquer-red with yellow spots, a sleeveless cape of black figured taffeta, and lace wristbands. She has a golden girdle and bracelets. In the left upper corner is a coat-of-arms, bearing three swans swimming to the right. Dark-grey background. Painted about 1620. [Pendant to 265.] Canvas on panel, 40 1/2 inches by 32 1/2 inches. In the chief Kassel inventory of 1749, No. 688. In the Picture Gallery, Kassel, 1903 catalogue, No. 214.

Hofstede de Groot identified it as a pendant to:

265. PORTRAIT OF A MAN STANDING. B. 99. Three-quarter-length. He seems about forty or forty-five years of age. He is turned three-quarters right, and looks at the spectator. His right hand, with the back upward, rests on his hip; his left hand holds his tall black hat. He has short fair hair, a moustache and a pointed beard. He is dressed in black satin with a white collar edged with lace, lace ruffles, and an embroidered wristband. At top to the right hangs his coat-of-arms, bearing in the upper field a Greek cross and in the lower three water-lily leaves. Painted about 1620. [Pendant to 374.] Canvas on panel, 40 inches by 30 1/2 inches. In the chief Kassel inventory of 1749, No. 687. In the Kassel Gallery, 1903 catalogue, No. 213.

In 1974 Seymour Slive listed both paintings as pendants of each other and remarked that they were first catalogued as A Man in Spanish clothes and A Woman at knee-length that were taken to Paris in by Jerome in 1806 and returned in 1814, presumably at the end of Napoleon's reign. Slive agreed with the traditional date of 1620 but felt that it showed similarities with Hals' militia group of 1616. He agreed with Numa S. Trivas that it was painted towards the close of the decade. In 1989 Claus Grimm agreed with both earlier conclusions and listed these pendants as numbers 14 & 15.

== Pendants ==
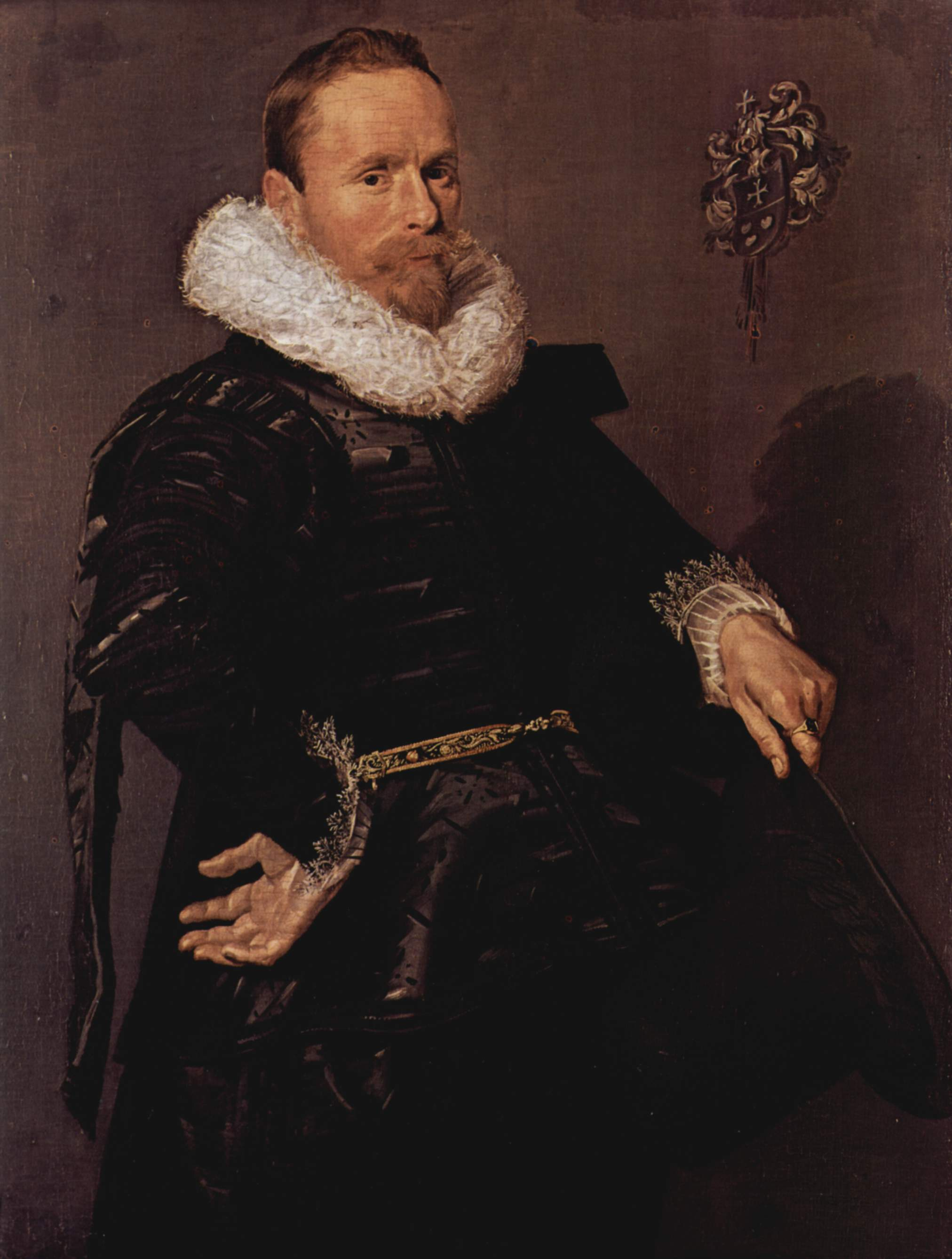

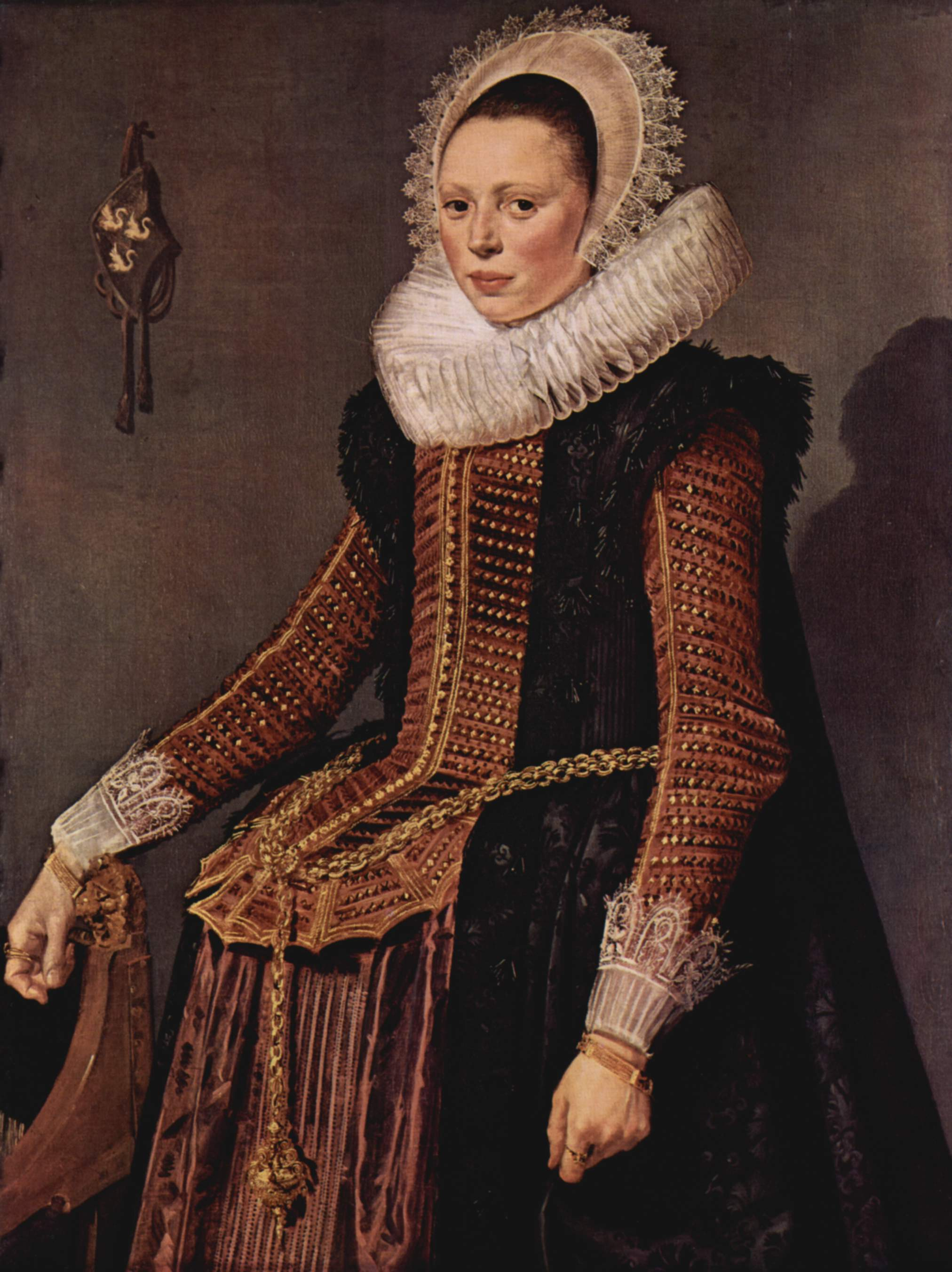

== See also ==
- List of paintings by Frans Hals
