= Gillis Schagen =

Dutch Golden Age painter

Gillis Schagen (1616, Alkmaar – 1668, Alkmaar), was a Dutch Golden Age painter.

== Biography ==
According to Houbraken, he was the son of Pieter Jansz Schagen, an important councilman of Alkmaar, who was taught to paint first by Salomon van Ravesteyn and then by the horse painter Pieter Cornelisz Verbeeck. He traveled by boat to Gdańsk where he was received by Joost Brasser, and then travelled to Elbing, where he was received by Bartholomeus Strobel. Schagen painted a portrait of the King of Poland to "prove his mastership of the art" for him. From there he went home for a short stay before travelling by boat to Dieppe and onwards to Paris, where he painted portraits of many important people there and in Orleans. In October 1639 he set sail again, and crossed the English channel to England. He visited admiral Maarten Tromp there, who invited him to draw his ships and observe the sea battle for inspiration. At that moment he was about to wage the Battle of the Downs against the Spanish under Antonio D'Oquendo. After observing the battle however, Schagen decided to return to the Netherlands without drawing the ships. He settled in Alkmaar where he became a member of the vroedschap like his father. After the Peace of Westphalia in 1648 he made another trip to Brabant with Admiral van Dorp and van den Cornput van Dordrecht. In 1651 he made a trip to Liege and Cologne. He was a respected regent of the orphanage in Alkmaar when he died at 52.

According to the RKD he painted portraits, history pieces, and genre works.
