= Jacobus Zaffius =

Dutch Catholic priest (1534–1618)

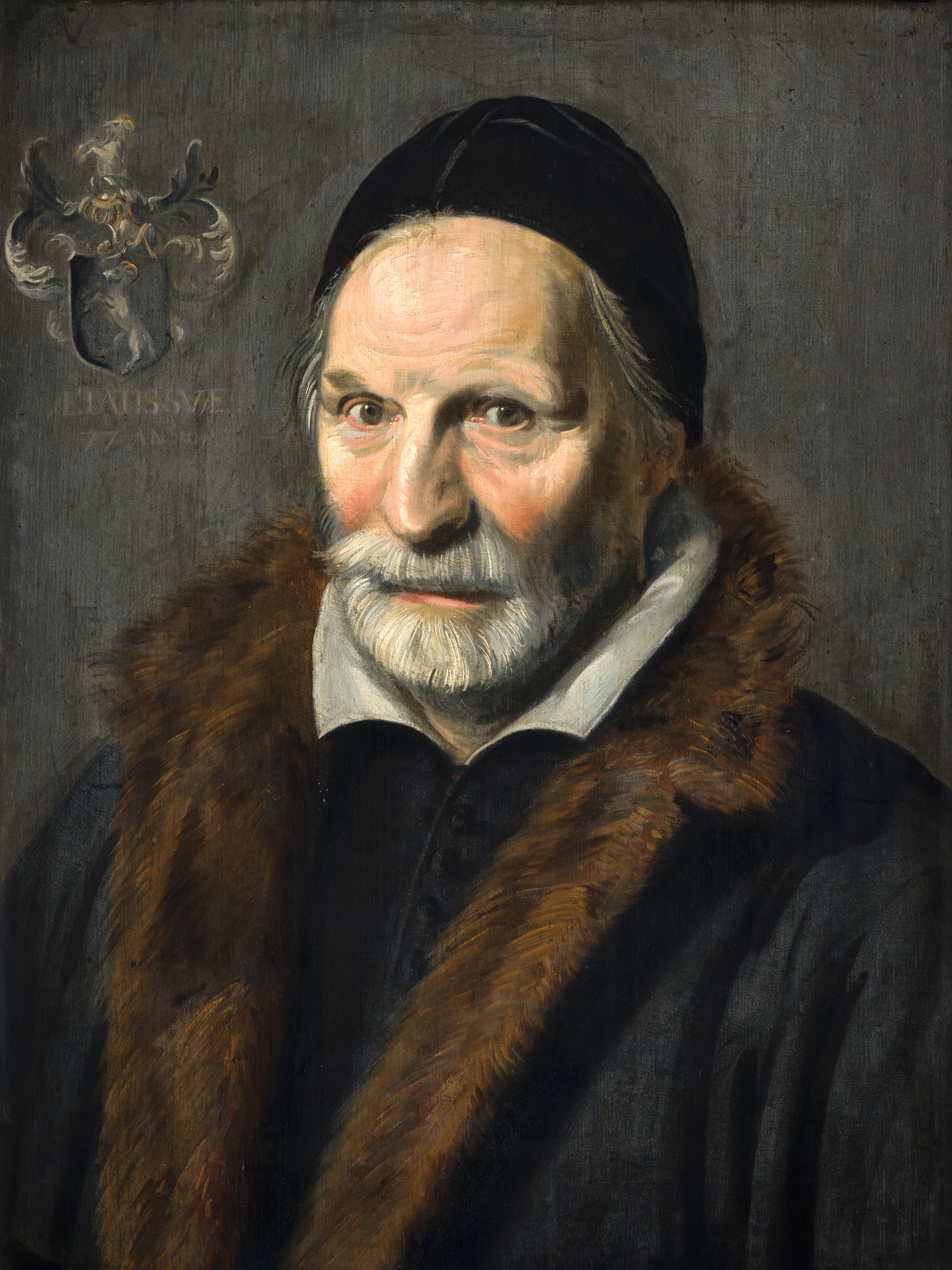
Frans Hals, Jacobus Zaffius in 1611, collection Frans Hals Museum

Jacobus Hendriksz Zaffius also known as Saffius or Saffio (1534 – 19 January 1618), was a Catholic priest in Haarlem.

== Biography ==
He was born in Amsterdam where he later owned some property.

From 1568 he was Prior of the Canons Regular monastery De Blinken in Heiloo. In May 1571 he became provost of the Grote Kerk, Haarlem. He witnessed the Satisfactie van Haarlem in 1577, as well as the Alteratie of Amsterdam on 26 May 1578. Three days after this, Calvinists plundered the Grote Kerk and two years later Zaffius went to jail for refusing to turn over Catholic property to the Haarlem city council. William the Silent granted him amnesty, and it was on this occasion that he made his donation to the Frans Loenenhofje. In 1611 he had his painting made by Frans Hals as a memorial to this fact. He died in Haarlem.

== Hals portrait ==
His portrait by Frans Hals was probably painted after 1609 to hang in the regent's room of the Frans Loenenhofje where a Zaffio dedication stone was mounted in the same year, but early records of it have been lost. According to Hofstede de Groot, who never saw it, the portrait was considered lost, as the original was only known from a print by Jan van de Velde. He wrote: "245. JACOBUS ZAFFIUS (1534-1618), Proctor for the Archbishop in Haarlem. M. 86. Half-length. He sits at a table, turned three-quarters right, and looks to the right past the spectator. His left hand rests on a skull; his right makes a gesture as if he were speaking. His right arm rests on the arm of the chair. He has a white moustache and beard. He wears a cap and a fur cloak over dark clothes. At top to the right is a coat-of-arms, with a goat jumping to the right, and below it the inscription, 'AETA 84, obiit 1618.' See Moes, Iconographia Batava, No. 9378. Described from a print by J. van der Velde, 1630; the original is lost."

This portrait was discovered in 1919 and was purchased by Anton Philips of Eindhoven and his wife Anna de Jongh, who gave it to the Frans Hals Museum in 1920. In 1974 Seymour Slive included it as the earliest painting attributable to Hals and at that time it was considered the lost original, but a fragment cut down on all sides. Restoration activities have since proven that the wooden panel was not cut down, but dendrological research has shown the panel was painted in the correct period. Currently the painting is considered the original and the engraving extended on all sides.

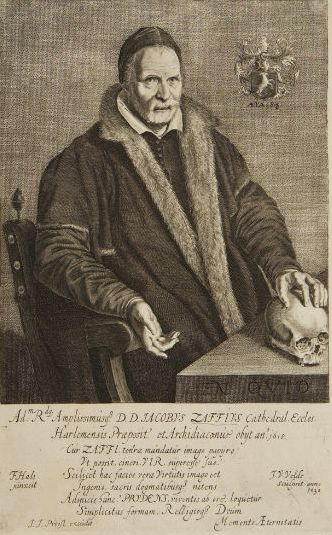

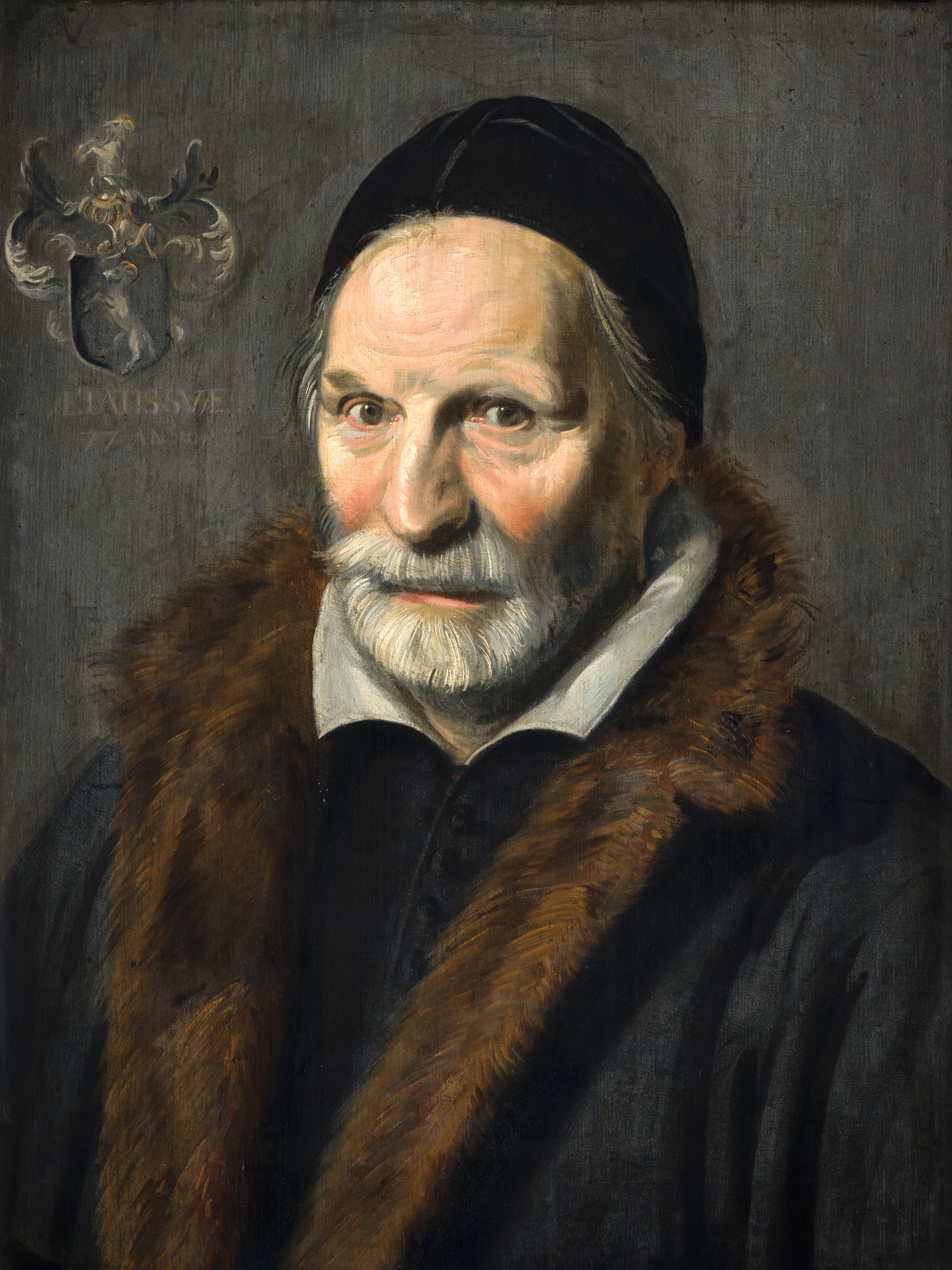

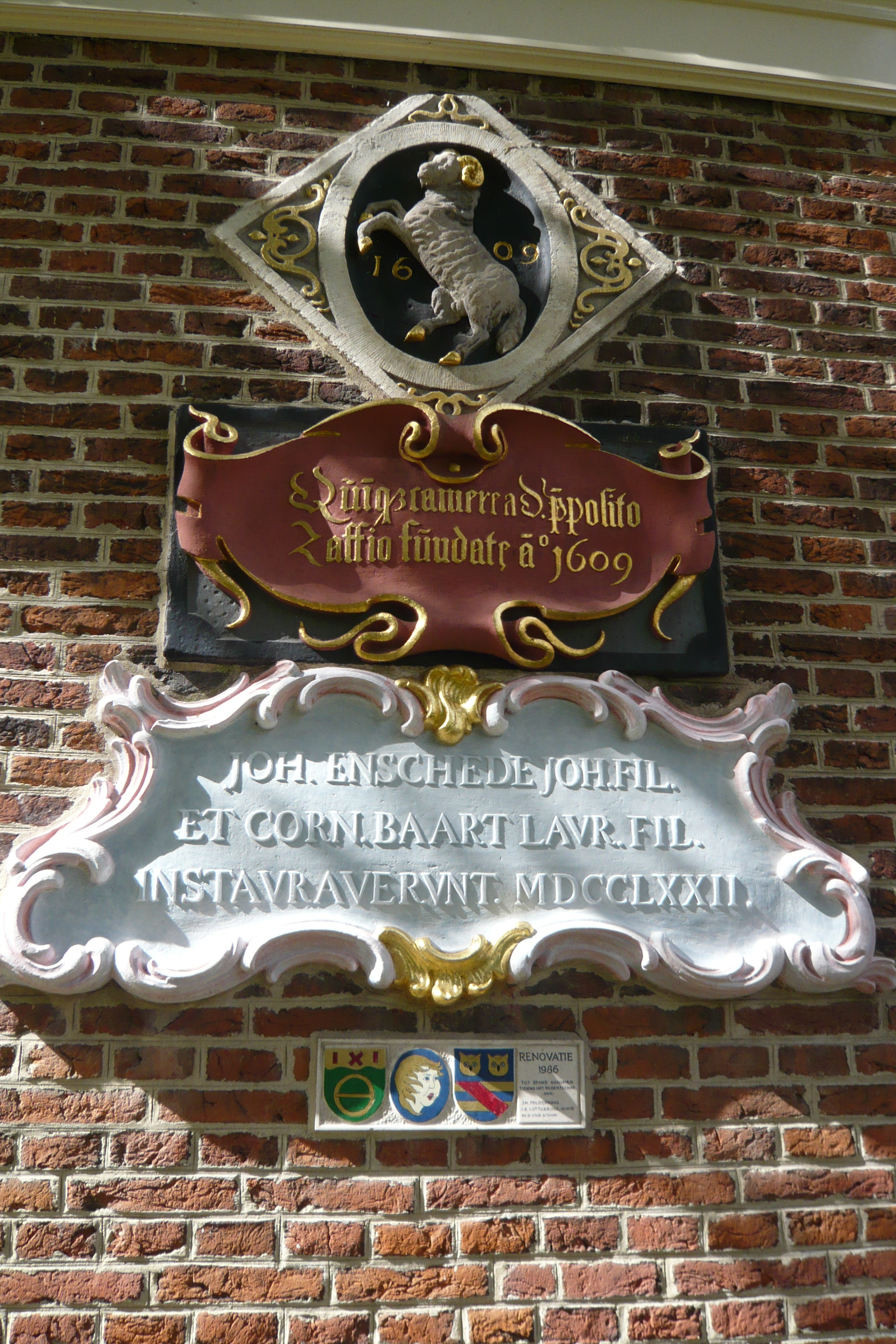
