= Frans Loenenhofje =

Hofje in Haarlem, Netherlands

Coordinates: 52°23′01″N 4°37′54″E

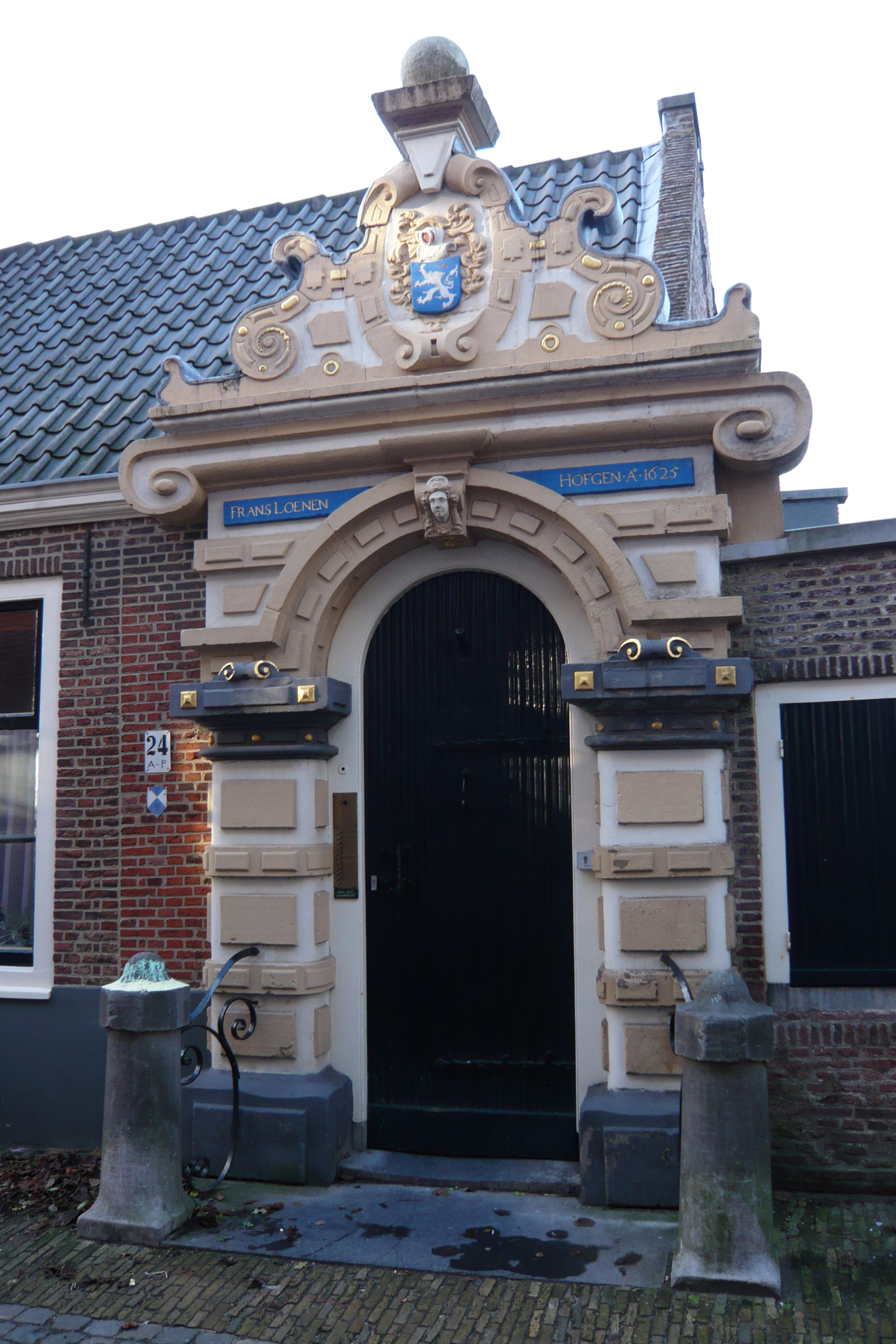
The Frans Loenen Hofje was founded in 1607, though the port designed by Lieven de Key shows the date 1625. The headless lion is the family shield of Frans Loenen.

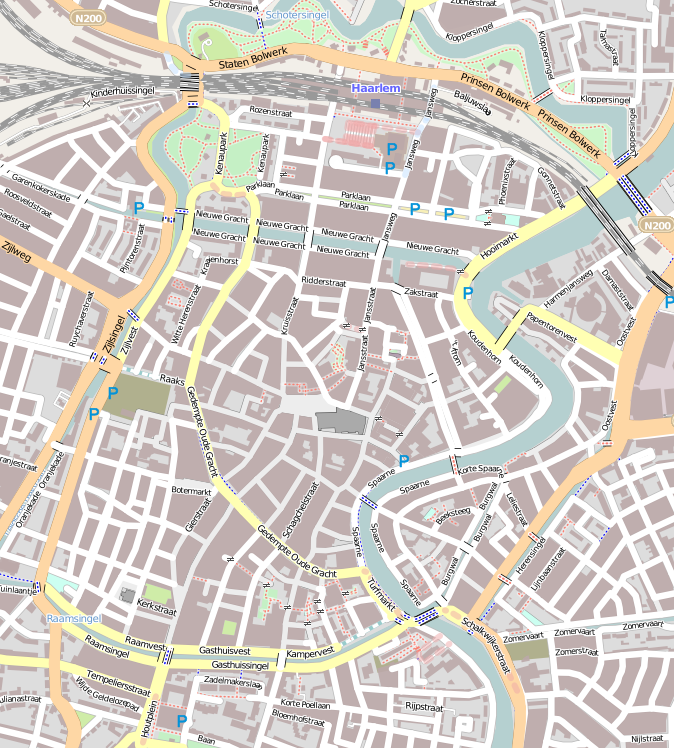
The Lutherse hofje is in the Witte Heren straat on the north side of the Lutherse Kerk (Haarlem), and the Frans Loenenhofje is on the southern side of that church.

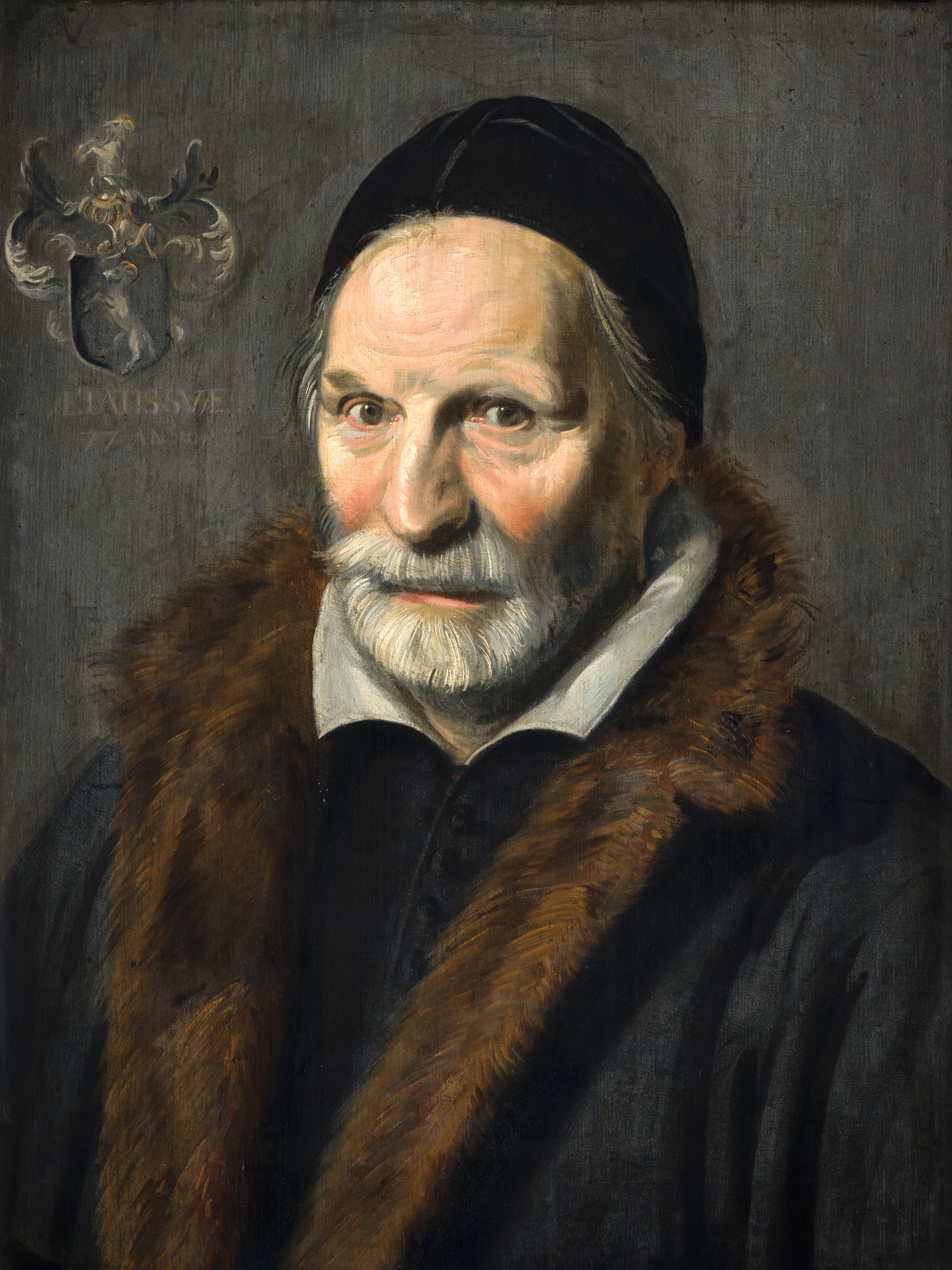
Jacobus Zaffius sponsored an additional 5 rooms.

The Frans Loenenhofje is a hofje in Haarlem, Netherlands, on the Witte Heren straat.

It was named the "Five room" or Vijfkamer hofje in 1607 after the five new rooms that were built from the proceeds of the will and testament of Frans Loenen (1543–1605).

Frans Loenen was a Catholic who fled to Haarlem from Amsterdam in 1578 for their milder disposition toward people of the Old Catholic faith. He left all of his goods to the poor in an extraordinary will drawn up 3 days before he died. His friends gave up trying to sort out his legacy, because most of his property was still located in the Spanish Netherlands, then enemy territory, and some of his money was tied up in outstanding bets. For example, he had bet a small fortune of 16,000 guilders that the siege of Sluis would not last two years. It was decided that a hofje would be the best option, in case any of the bets paid out, which they did.

The garden of this hofje used to be part of a famed garden from the St Anthony's monastery, which was founded in 1414. The St. Anthony order was later associated with the Vrouwe- en Antonie Gasthuys and the monastery was inhabited by Norbertine monks in 1484. The Norbertines who tended the garden wore white scapulars. Thus the name of the street; "White gentlemen street". They remained there until 1543, when the monastery lands came under the control of the St. Elisabeth Gasthuis. Their lands were officially confiscated and secularized in 1581 by the city council after the Protestant Reformation, just as all other Catholic buildings and lands in Haarlem after the iconoclasm.

For some reason the actual moment of transferral of the deeds only took place fifteen years later in 1596, and the Catholic associations with this property was probably the reason it was selected by the executors of the Frans Loenen will.

Two years later, in 1607, the provost Jacobus Zaffius sponsored an additional 5 rooms, thereafter known as the "provost rooms" of the Frans Loenen Hofje. Jacobus Zaffius had been abbot in the St. Anthony's monastery in Heiloo from 1578 to 1571, when he became provost of the Sint-Bavokerk. He witnessed the iconoclasm and 3 years later went to jail for refusal to turn over Catholic property to the city council. William of Orange granted him amnesty, and it was on this occasion that he made his donation to the hofje and in 1611 he had his painting made as a memorial to this fact.

The hofje currently has 10 rooms for women, who must have a minimum age of 60 years and who must have lived in Haarlem for five years or longer.
