= Pieter Cornelisz Verbeeck =

Dutch Golden Age painter

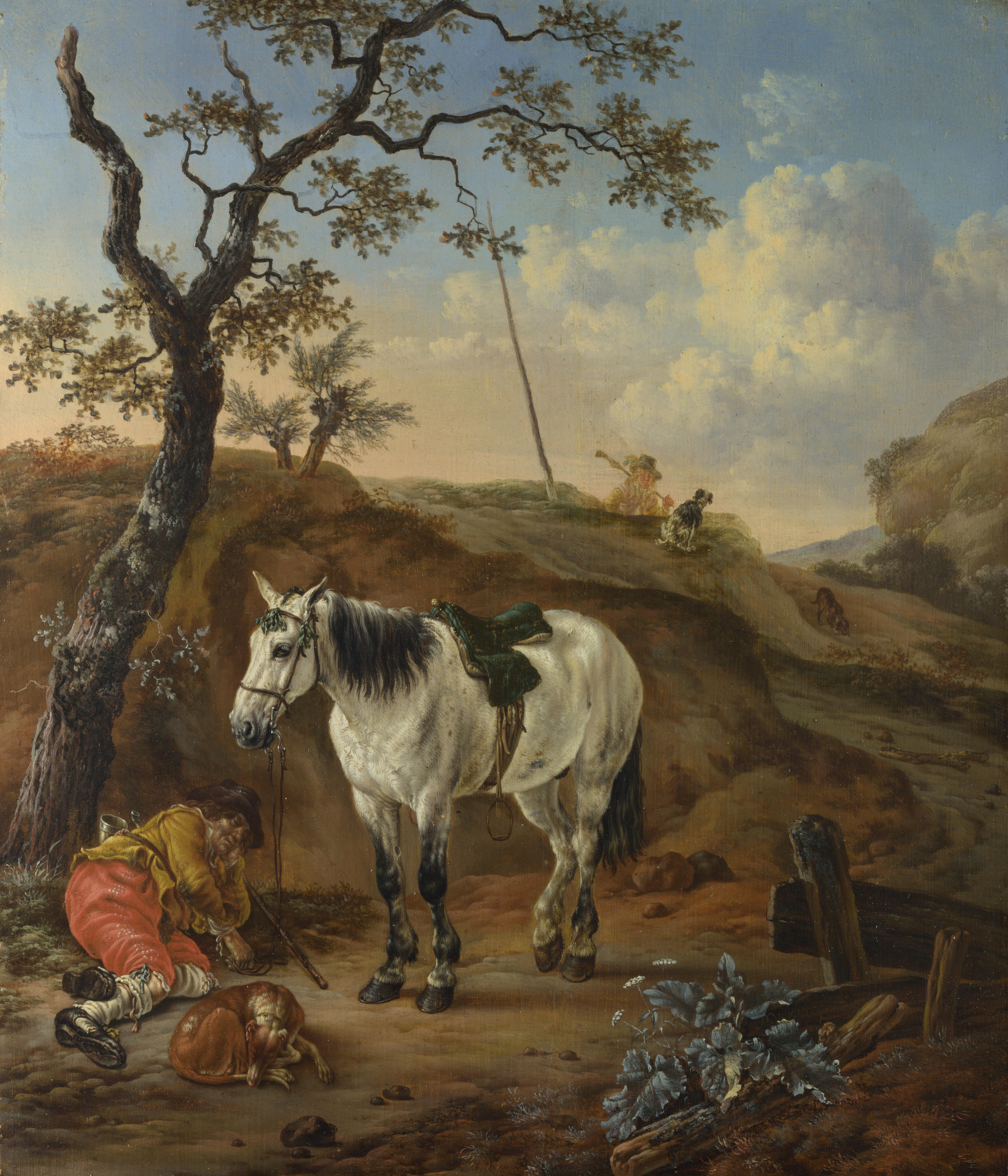
The gray horse.

Pieter Cornelisz Verbeeck (1610–1654) was a Dutch Golden Age painter.

== Biography ==
Verbeeck was born and died in Haarlem. According to Houbraken, he taught (horse) painting to Gillis Schagen, the son of an important councilman of Alkmaar.

According to the RKD in 1635 he moved to Alkmaar where he married and became a member of the Guild of St. Luke there. In 1638 he moved to Utrecht, but after his wife died in 1642 he returned to Haarlem, where he married Elisabeth van Beresteyn, the sister of his friend Claes van Beresteyn, in 1643 and where he became a member of the Haarlem Guild of St. Luke in 1645. He painted still life, landscapes and portraits.
