= Lutherse Kerk, Haarlem =

Church in Haarlem

Coordinates: 52°23′2″N 4°37′53″E

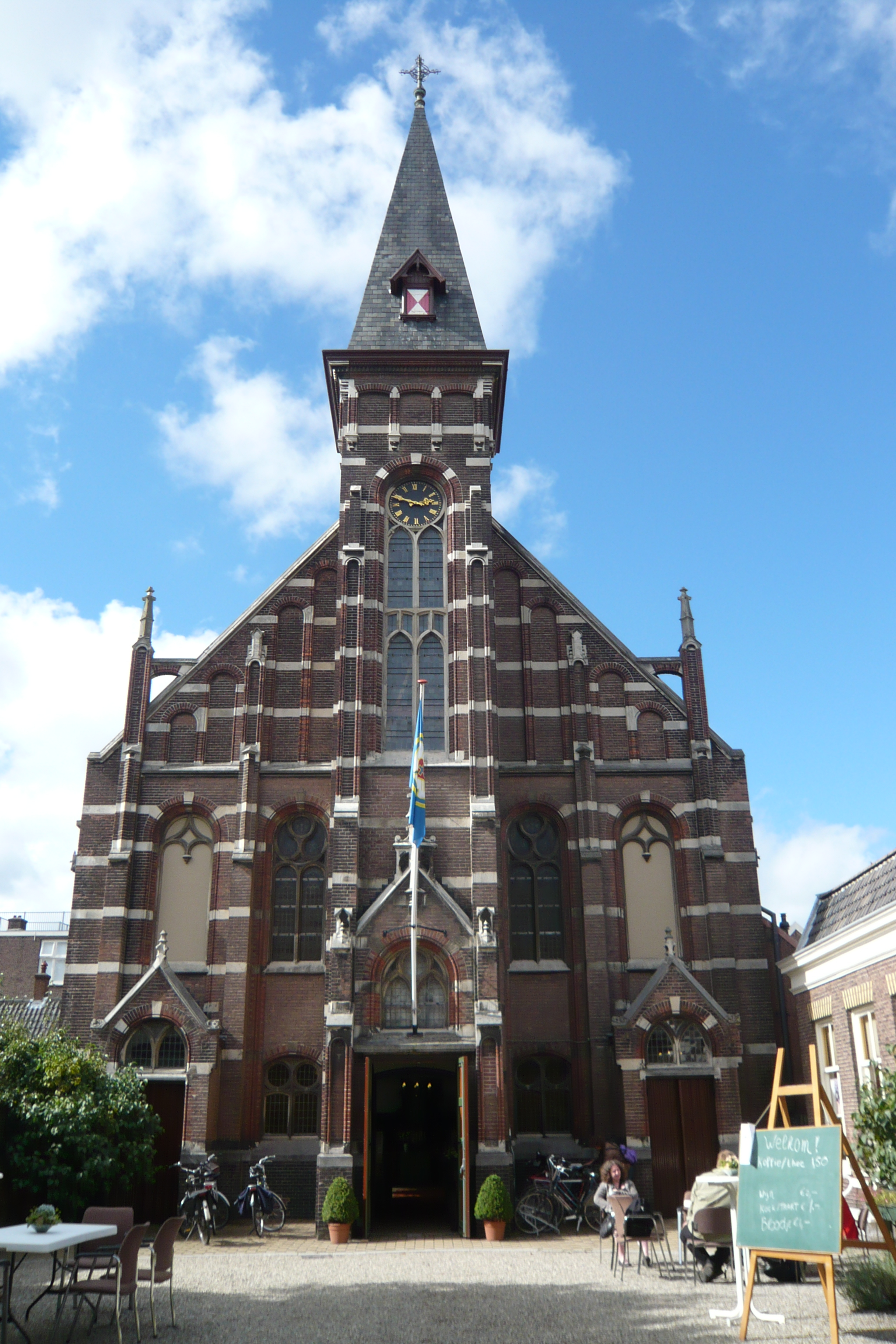
The Lutherse kerk in Haarlem.

The Lutherse kerk in Haarlem is a Lutheran church dating from the 17th century on the Witte Herenstraat in Haarlem, Netherlands.

== History ==
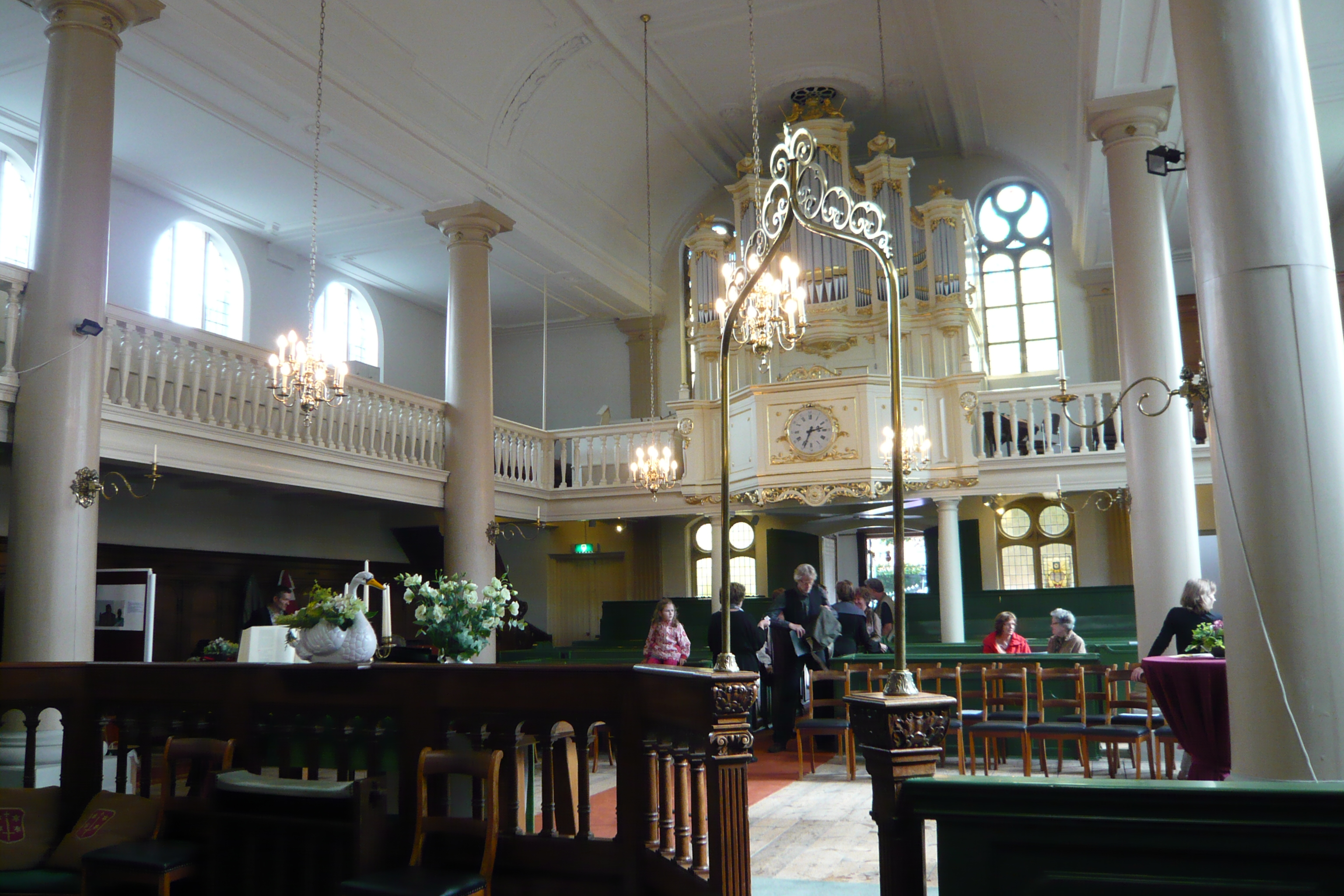
Interior with organ.

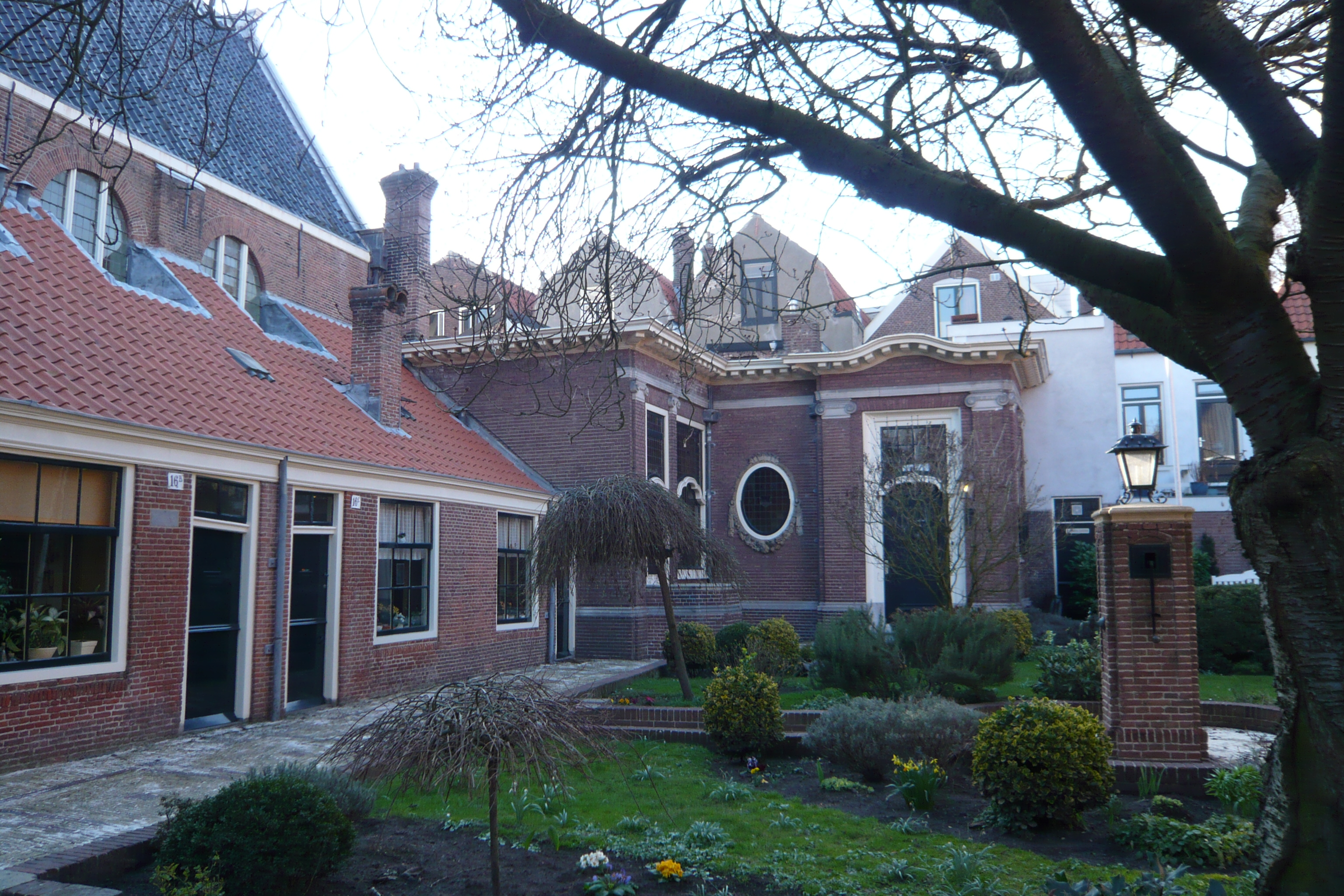
The Lutherse Hofje is situated on the north side of the church, with several rooms (left) attached to the church itself. In the back of the small houses is the Regent's room with outdoor pulpit.

The Lutheran church was built in 1615 on the site of the older "Witte Heren" monastery (named after the white religious habit of the monks) that itself was demolished after the Protestant Reformation of the 16th century. In the second half of the 19th century a new facade was built. The French mechanical clock in the tower is from 1892. The organ was built in 1882 by Julius Strobel to replace a Gideon Bätz organ made in 1790.

The church was originally a clandestine church, hidden from view, but today can easily be seen from the street.
