= Lutherse Hofje =

Housing for elderly people in Netherlands

Coordinates: 52°23′02″N 4°37′54″E

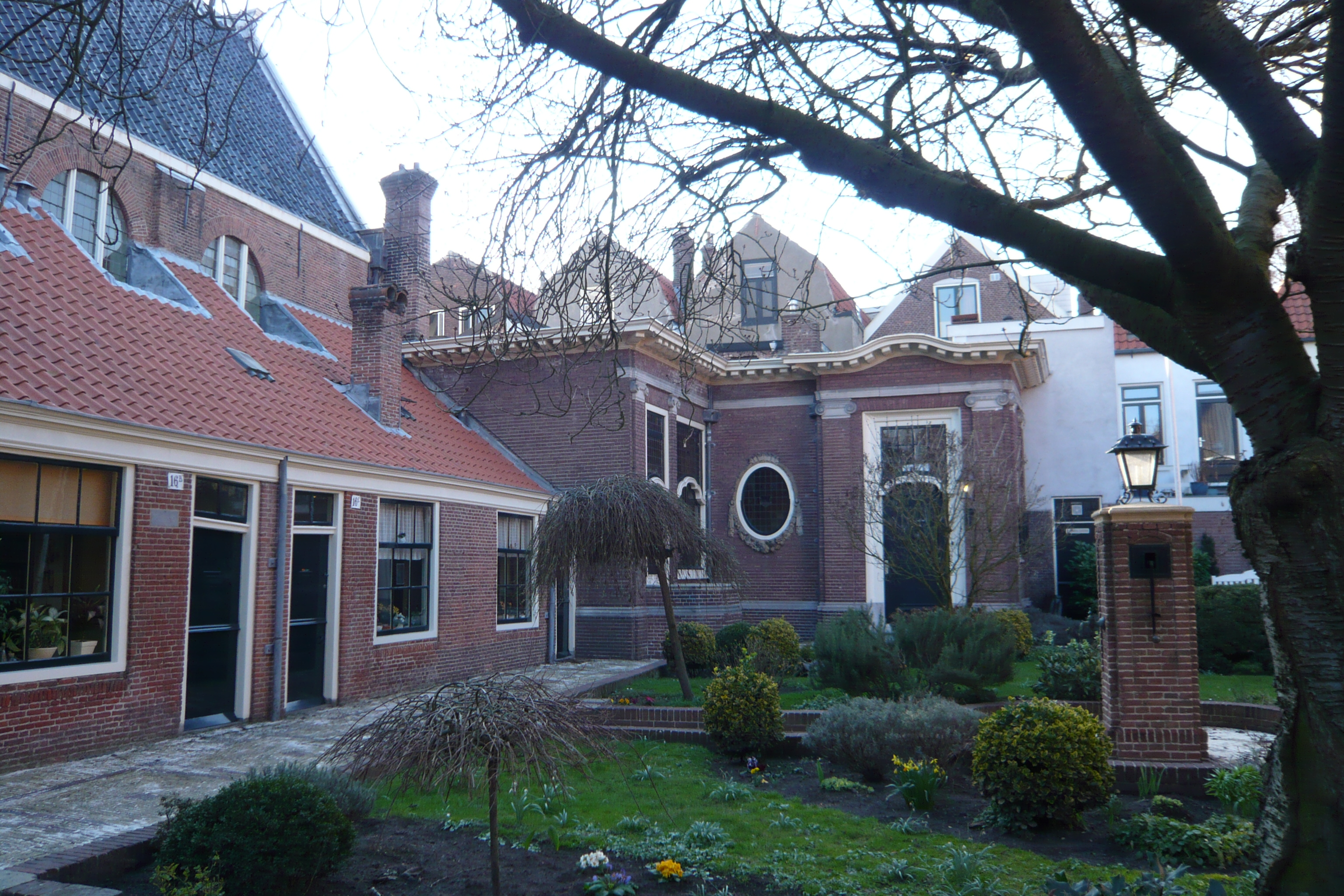
Luthers Hofje today. In the back of the small houses is the Regent's room and adjoining outdoor pulpit. Behind the houses on the left is the Lutheran Church. The original houses were these built against the church and the houses on the opposite side of the garden were built later.

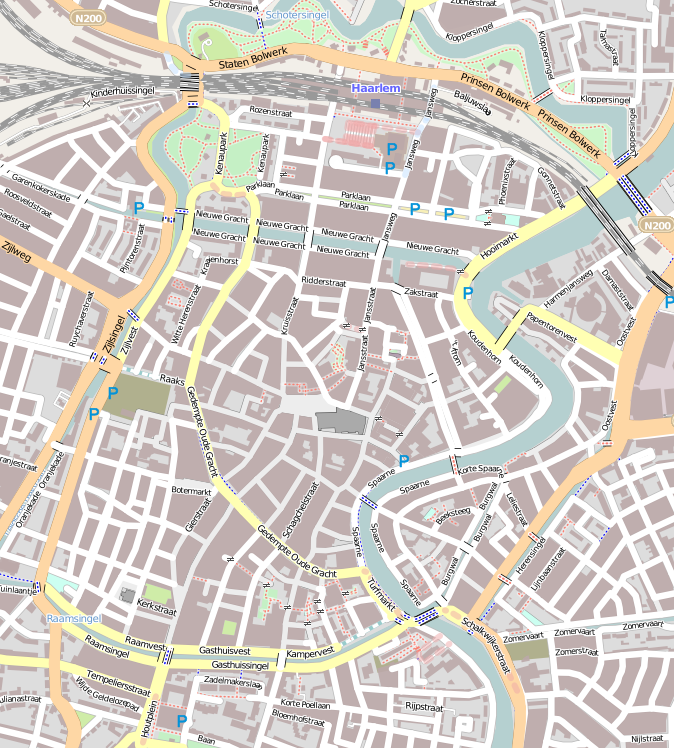
The Lutherse hofje is in the Witte Heren straat on the north side of the Lutherse Kerk (Haarlem), and the Frans Loenenhofje is on the southern side of that church.

The Lutherse Hofje is a hofje in Haarlem, Netherlands.

== History ==
The hofje was founded by the Lutheran Church in 1615. Originally the people living in the hofje were members of this church, but nowadays only the board of the hofje is appointed by the Lutheran Church. The hofje adjoins the Lutheran church itself, and has an unusual addition in the garden, namely an outdoor pulpit. From this pulpit, the minister could address the women in the hofje.

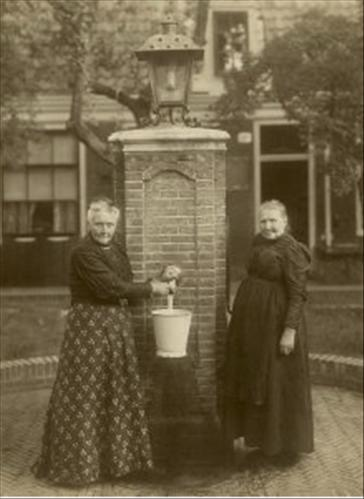
Luthers Hofje in 1910.

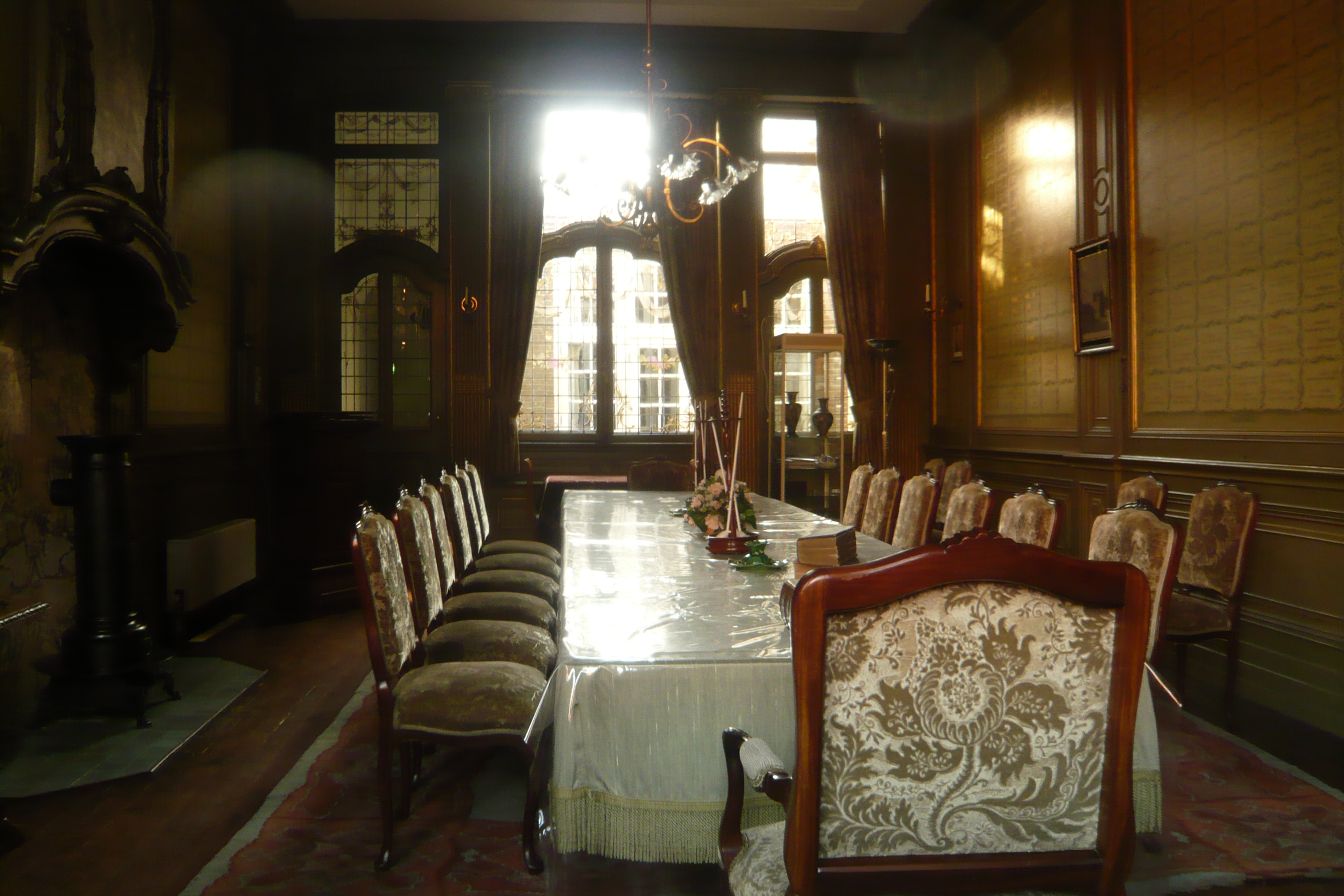
Regent's room.

With five houses, it is the smallest hofje in Haarlem.

Location: Witte Herenstraat 20
