= Numa S. Trivas =

- Born: 1899; Nicolaef, Russian Empire
- Died: 17 April 1942; Berkeley, California, U.S.
- Resting place: East Lawn Memorial Park, Sacramento; 38.5612°N 121.4515°W
- Occupations: Art historian, curator, collector
- Employer: E. B. Crocker Art Gallery

Numa S. Trivas (1899 – 17 April 1942) was an art historian and collector who became a curator of art at the E. B. Crocker Art Gallery. He was born in Nicolaef, Russia and studied at the Institute of Art History in Saint Petersburg, finishing his studies at the Ecole du Louvre in Paris and the University of Berlin. He was active from 1926 in Amsterdam, where he worked for the Rothmann gallery, and emigrated before World War II to New York City in 1939, settling in Sacramento, California. He died of a heart attack in Berkeley on 17 April 1942, and was buried at East Lawn Memorial Park in Sacramento.

== Works ==
- Three Centuries of Landscape Drawing: Exhibition Held in August Through October 1940
- The Paintings of Frans Hals, 1941
- A Pioneering Collection: Master Drawings from the Crocker, 1940
- Two Formulas by Liotard, 1941
- Les portraits de J.-E. Liotard par lui-mème, 1936
