= Pieter Soutman =

Dutch painter

Pieter Claesz Soutman
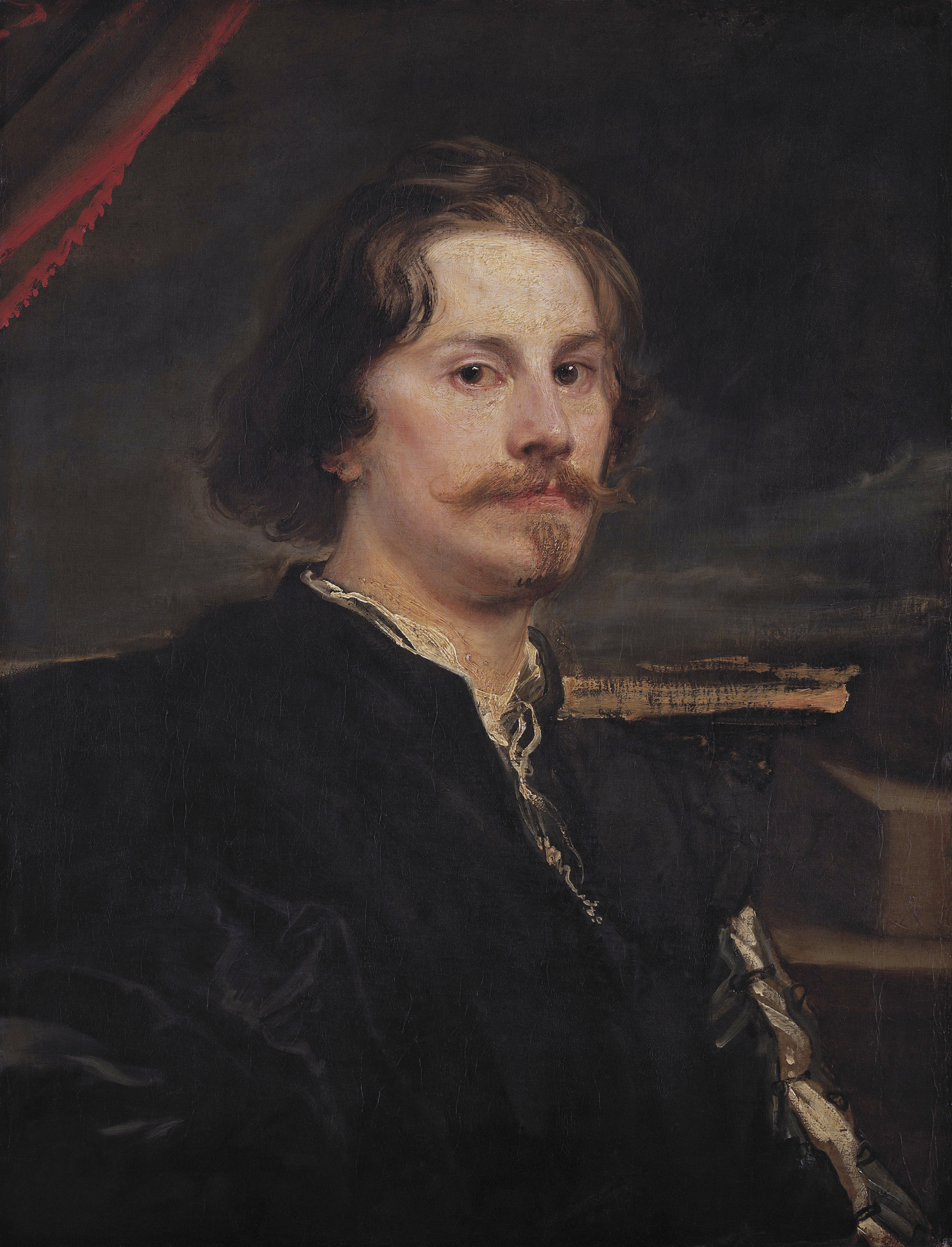
- Portrait of Pieter Soutman by Anthony van Dyck (1620-1621)
- Born: Pieter Claesz; 1593-1601; Haarlem
- Died: 16 August 1657 (aged 55–64); Haarlem
- Known for: Painting
- Movement: Baroque

Pieter Claesz Soutman (1593-1601 – 16 August 1657) was a Dutch Golden Age painter and printmaker from Haarlem.

== Biography ==
Soutman was born and died in Haarlem, where he was a contemporary of Frans Hals, Hendrick Gerritsz Pot, and Pieter Claesz, and seems to have been influenced by all three, considering the various attributions of his paintings through the centuries. According to the RKD, he was the youngest of six children of the wealthy Catholic owner of the Haarlem beer brewery De Werelt. According to Houbraken, Soutmann trained with Peter Paul Rubens in Antwerp. He must have been successful, because Samuel Ampzing mentions him in his poem about Haarlem. Probably during Prince Władysław Vasa's visit to Antwerp in 1624, he was recommended by Rubens as an excellent painter. That same year he went to Poland, where he was appointed royal court painter. Soutman was employed as a servitor of the king Sigismund III Vasa until 1628, when he returned to Haarlem. His family connections enabled him to become affiliated with the Catholic Hofje Codde en Van Beresteijn. Today this is one hofje, but in his day it was two; the Hofje of Codde and the Hofje of Beresteijn. He was probably regent of the Codde hofje. Soutman became a respected portrait painter in Haarlem and won many commissions for group portraits, including lucrative schutterstukken.

== Legacy ==
One of his portraits that he painted for the Beresteijn family (regents of both the Beresteijn and Codde hofjes) was later sold as a Frans Hals to the Louvre in the 1860s, but this was not from deception, but ignorance on the part of the hofje regents. This sale was considered a scandal in the Dutch press at the time, and Conrad Busken Huet wrote that the government should keep this national treasure in the country (he was living in Haarlem at the time).

Soutman's work hangs today in various museums, and in the Huis ten Bosch in The Hague. His pupils were Cornelis Visscher, Jacob Louys (1595-na 1635), and Pieter van Sompel.

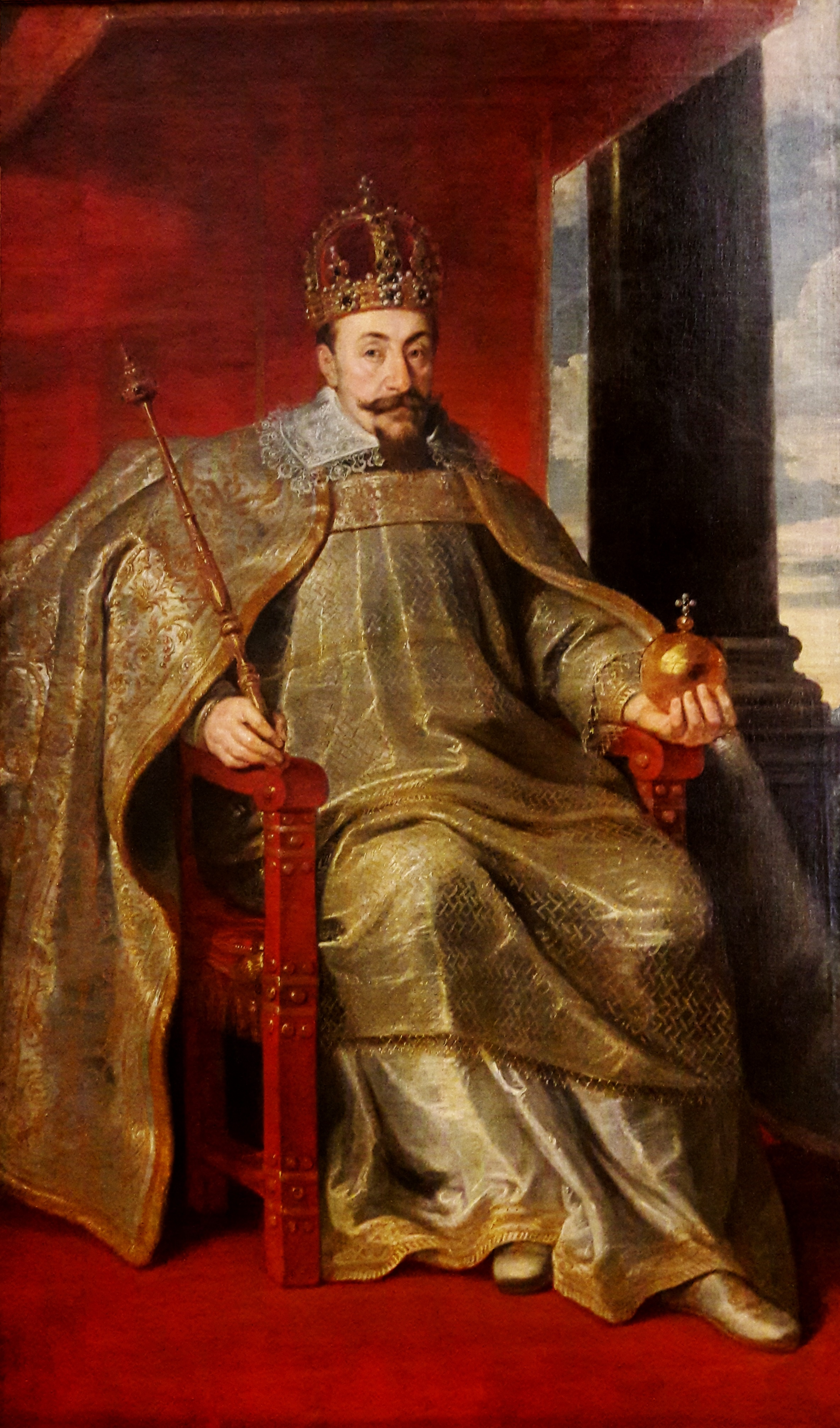
Portrait of Sigismund III of Poland in coronation robes, 1626

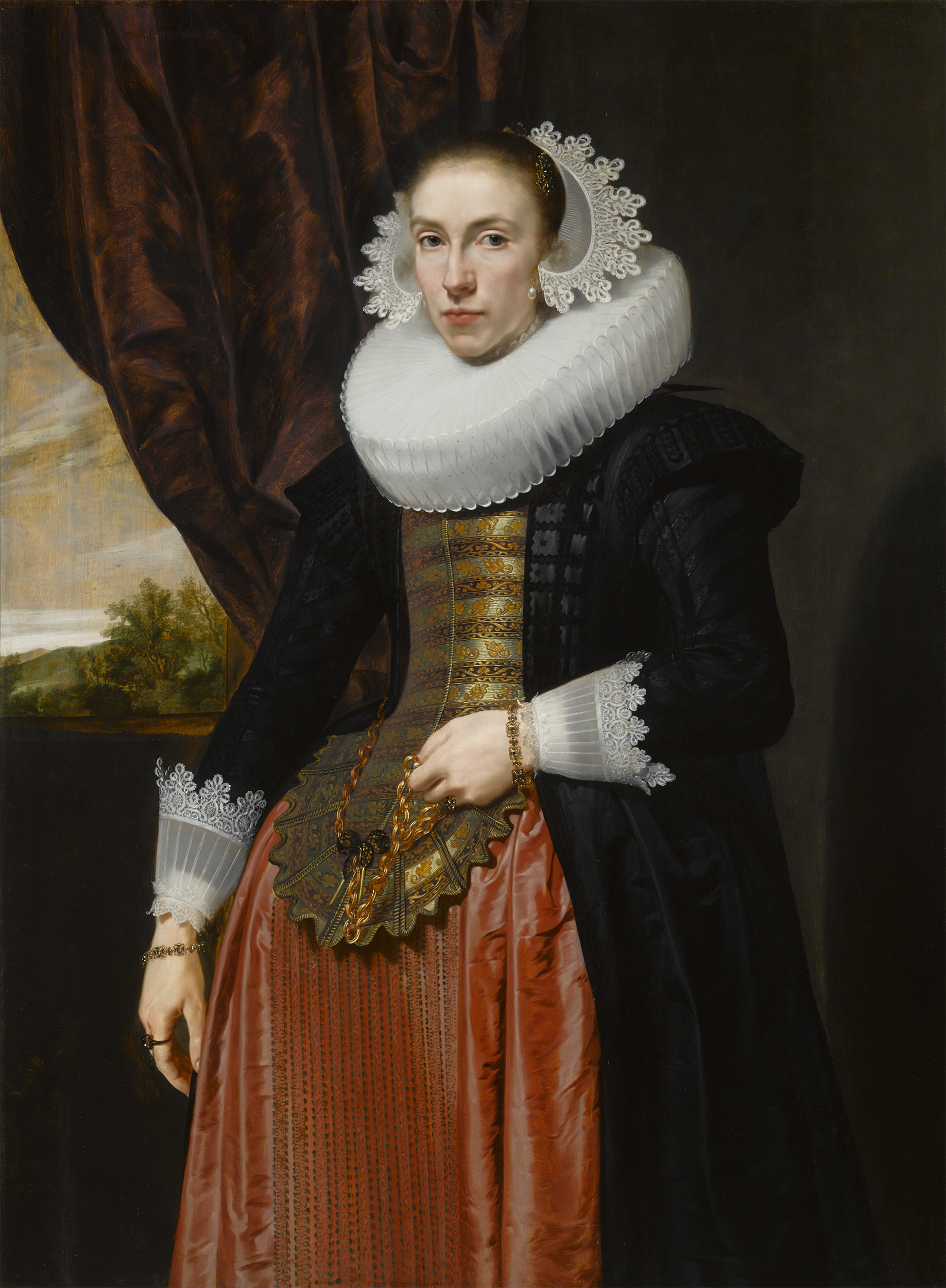
Portrait of Amilia van Zuylen van Nyevelt vrouwe van Aartsbergenthe, wife of Alexander van der Capellen, 1626

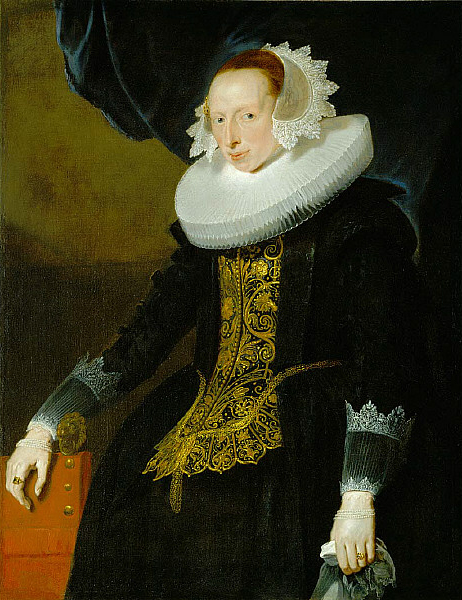
Portrait of an unknown woman ca. 1630

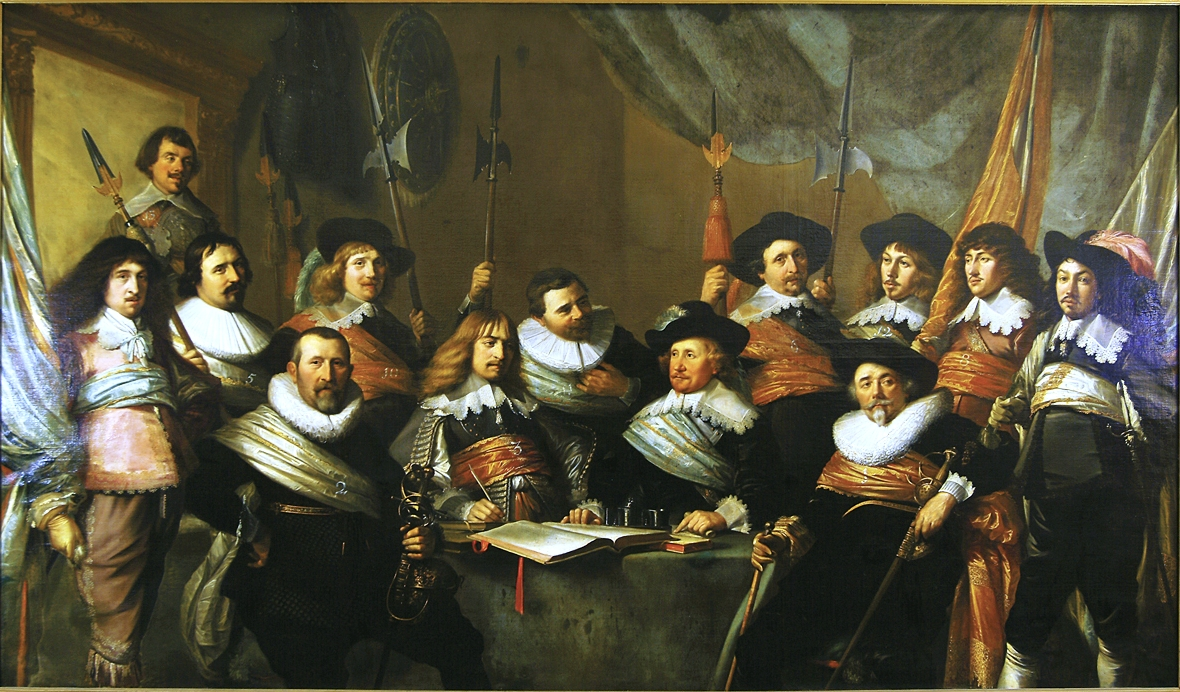
Civic guard (schutterstuk) in Haarlem, 1642

== See also ==
- Peter Danckerts de Rij, another Dutch Golden Age painter at the Polish court.
