= Portrait of Isaak Abrahamsz. Massa =

Painting by Frans Hals

Portrait of Isaak Abrahamsz Massa
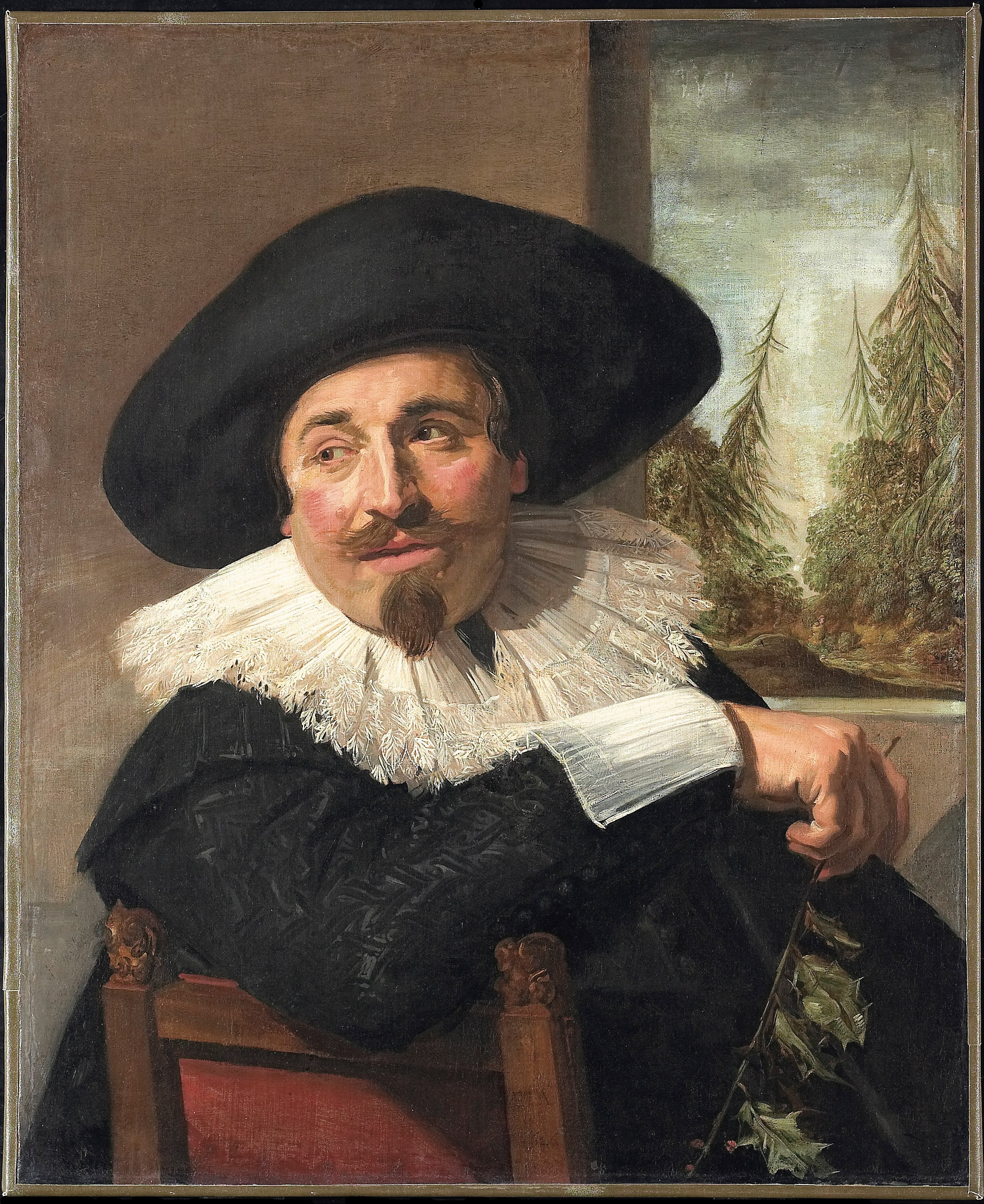
- Artist: Frans Hals
- Year: 1626
- Medium: Oil on canvas
- Dimensions: 79.7 cm × 65.0 cm (31.37 in × 25.62 in)
- Location: Art Gallery of Ontario; Toronto

Portrait of Isaak Abrahamsz. Massa is a 1626 oil-on-canvas painting by the Dutch artist Frans Hals that is in the collection of the Art Gallery of Ontario. It depicts Isaac Massa, a prosperous merchant and a close friend of Hals. Massa was the subject of an earlier work by Hals – Isaak Abrahamsz Massa and Beatrix van der Laen – which also featured his wife. Massa commissioned another portrait by Hals in 1635, which is in the San Diego Museum of Art.

The painting is inscribed with the date 1626, but there is no mention of the identity of the sitter. For many years this led to debate, and it was often assumed to be a self-portrait. Wilhelm Valentiner was a noted proponent of this theory. Other scholars, such as Numa S. Trivas, did advance the idea that it was a portrait of Massa, and this was confirmed by the discovery of an inscription on a seventeenth-century engraving.

The 1626 portrait is noted for its informality and vitality. Massa appears leaning over the back of a chair, a significant departure from standard formal portrait poses of the period. Hals would later use similar poses in a number of other paintings, and it would also be employed by other artists in later centuries. Massa's expression is candid, distracted. He is relaxed and engaged in his own affairs. Hals's brush strokes too are quick and free instead of smooth and controlled, which not only contributes to Hals's distinct style but also allowed him to complete an entire painting in one sitting, which accounts for the high volume he produced in his lifetime. Many of Hals's contemporaries were students of Caravaggio, influenced by his strong chiaroscuro. Though Hals may also have looked to Caravaggio his use of light is even, but Hals still manages to create bold highlights of Massa's facial features – the right side of his face is illuminated while the left falls into a natural shadow.

Massa had made his fortune as a silk merchant in Russia, and was a noted expert on the country. The view through the window of large coniferous trees may be intended to reflect this, it being a scene of Muscovy where much of Massa's trading was conducted. The landscape in the background may have not been painted by Hals, perhaps being the work of noted landscape artist Pieter de Molijn. In Massa's hand he holds a sprig of holly. In traditional symbolism this represents friendship and constancy, and may reflect the close relationship between the artist and subject. It has also been interpreted as Massa's pledge to be faithful to his wife during his long absences.

For many years the painting was part of the collection of the Earls Spencer. The 1822 Bibliotheca Spenceriana, a catalogue of the Spencer collection, describes it as hanging in one of the bedrooms of the estate. In 1924 Albert Spencer, 7th Earl Spencer was forced to sell off part of the family collection to pay down debts. He sold the Hals, along with other works to art merchant Joseph Duveen. The next year Duveen sold the painting to Canadian businessman Frank P. Wood. Upon Wood's death in 1955 his collection was given to the Art Gallery of Ontario, which is where the portrait still resides. In 1959 the painting was stolen from the gallery, along with five other masterworks. The insurance company agreed to pay a ransom for the stolen pictures, and three weeks after disappearing the painting was recovered from a storage room in Parkdale. It had sustained only slight damage.

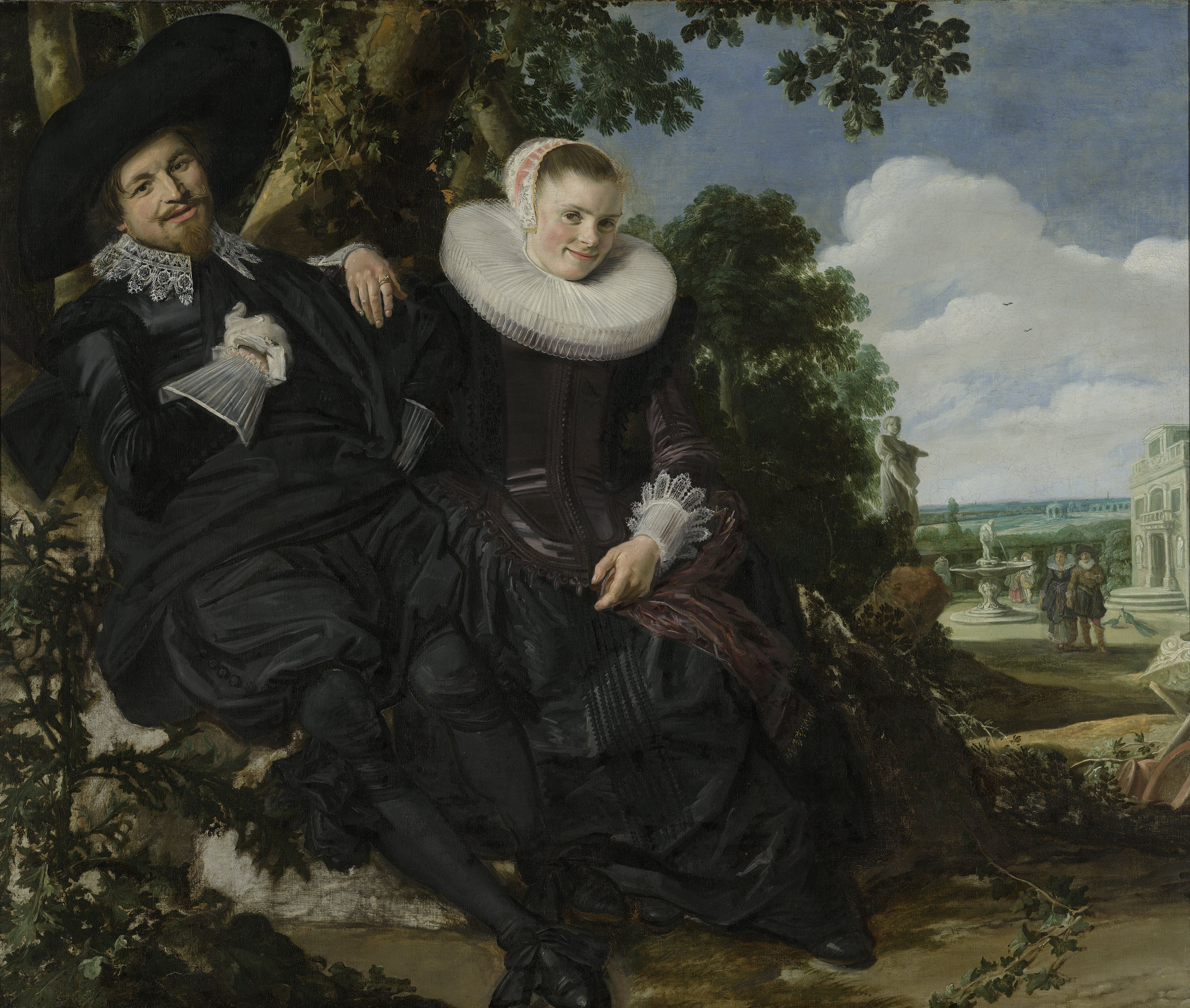
Hals's Marriage Portrait of Isaac Massa and Beatrix van der Laen, 1622, at the Metropolitan Museum of Art, New York

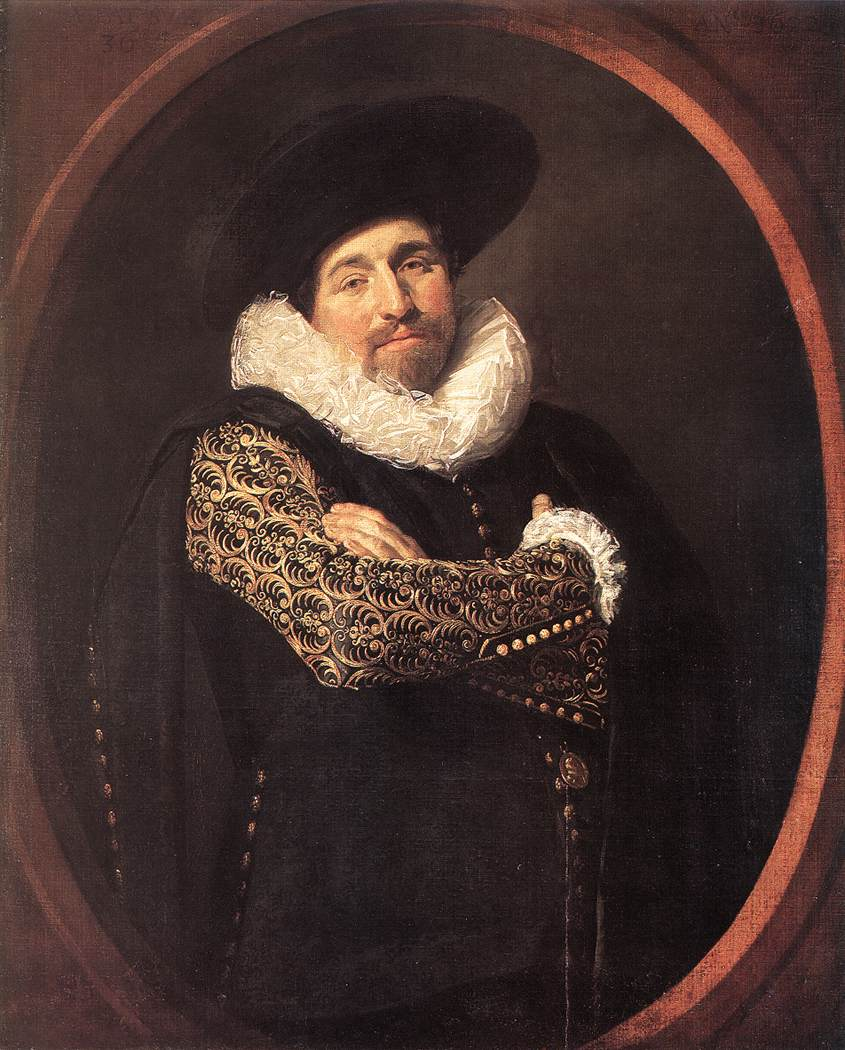
Another 1622 portrait of Isaac Massa by Frans Hals; this one is at Chatsworth House

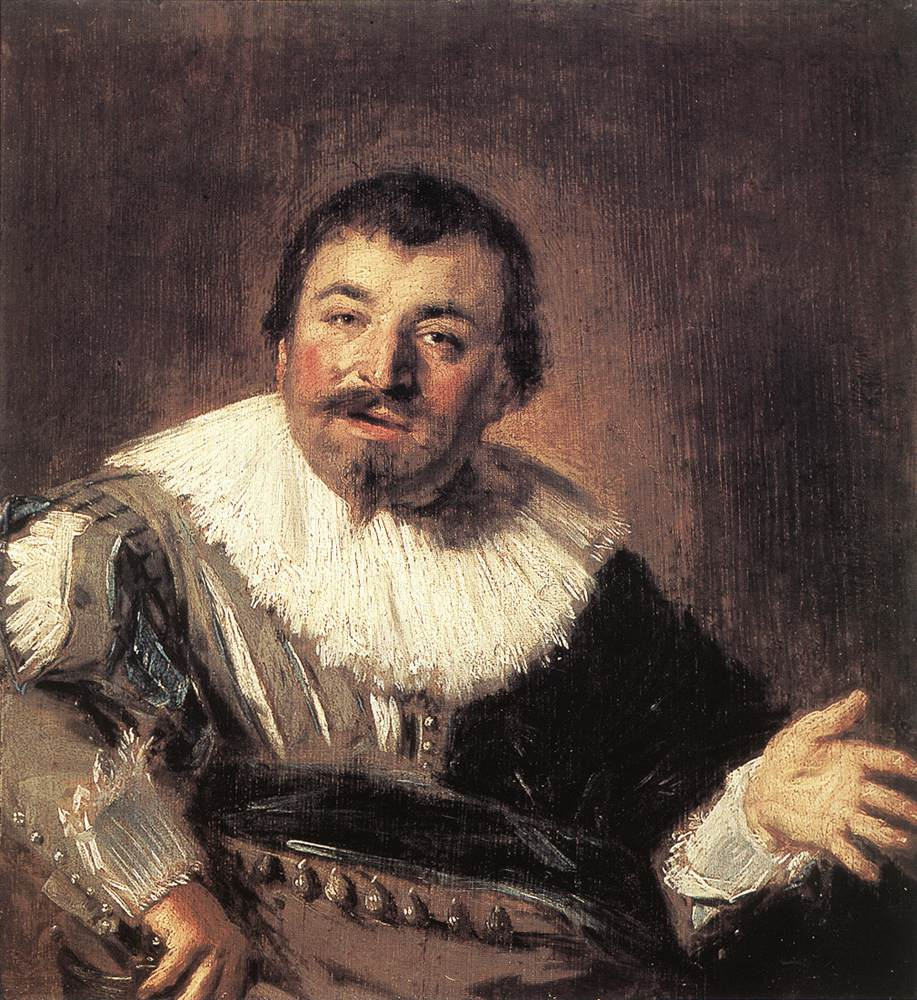
Hals's 1635 portrait of Massa, at San Diego

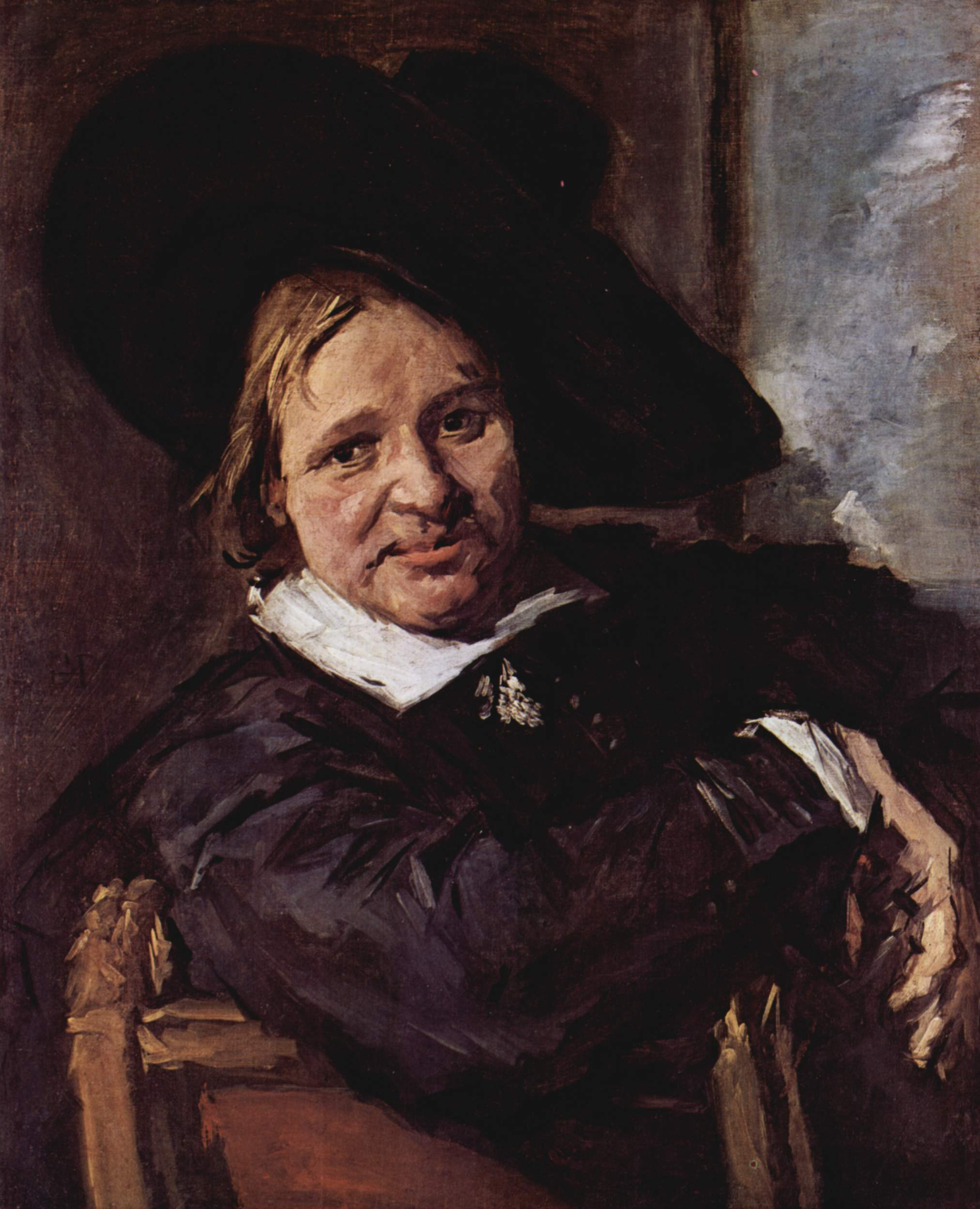
1665 portrait by Hals of an unidentified man in the same pose as the Toronto portrait, showing the artist's style in his old age, with looser brushwork

== See also ==
- List of paintings by Frans Hals
