= Antonius de Liedekerke =

Dutch sea captain and ambassador

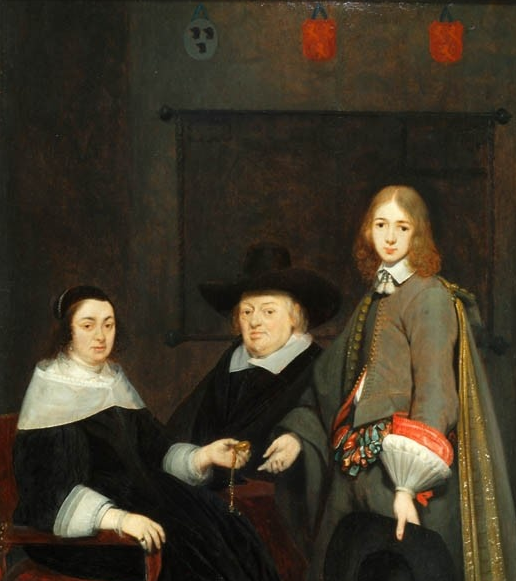
Portrait of De Liedekercke, his wife and their son by Gerard ter Borch

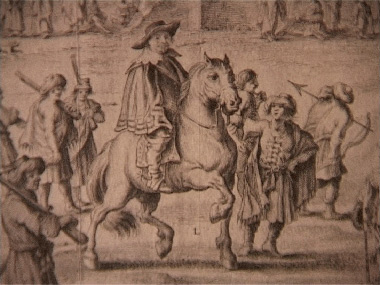
Detail of the engraving by Adriaen Matham, 1640.

Antonius de Liedekerke, also Antonie Charles de Liedekercke (1587–1661) was a Dutch sea captain and ambassador to the court of the king of Morocco Mohammed esh Sheikh es Seghir in the 17th century.

Liedekerke was born in Antwerp. In 1627 he married Willemina van Braeckel (1604/5-after 1661). In 1637 the couple was painted by Johannes Verspronck. Both portraits are in the Frans Hals Museum. In 1638 they had one son, called Samuel. He was painted by Gerard ter Borch as a child, together with his parents.

Antonius de Liedekerke left Texel on 1 September 1640 and arrived in Salé three months later. After a few days the Gelderland left for Asfi. Liedekercke liked the weather around Christmas and the local bread. The daughter of Murat Rais, who had been travelling with him, met with her father. The figurehead of the saint was removed. Then they sailed to Mogador. In March he visited the king in Marrakesh. Liedekercke was accompanied by the engraver Adriaen Matham. Matham left numerous drawings of fishes and sharks, including an engraving of the El Badi Palace, which they visited in March, and before it was destroyed. In July they left Safia with 45 Dutchmen, who had been in prison for two years; the cost of 28 more sailors was too high and left in Maroc.

Because of strong winds they sailed to Madeira, described by Liedekercke as a paradise. 115 sailors went ashore and drank much wine. In August they sailed back to Safia. Liedekercke arrived on 12 November 1641 on Texel. He died, twenty years later, in Haarlem.

The account of his journey was bought by Prince Eugene of Savoy and is now in the Austrian National Library.

== Wedding pendant portraits in the Frans Hals Museum ==
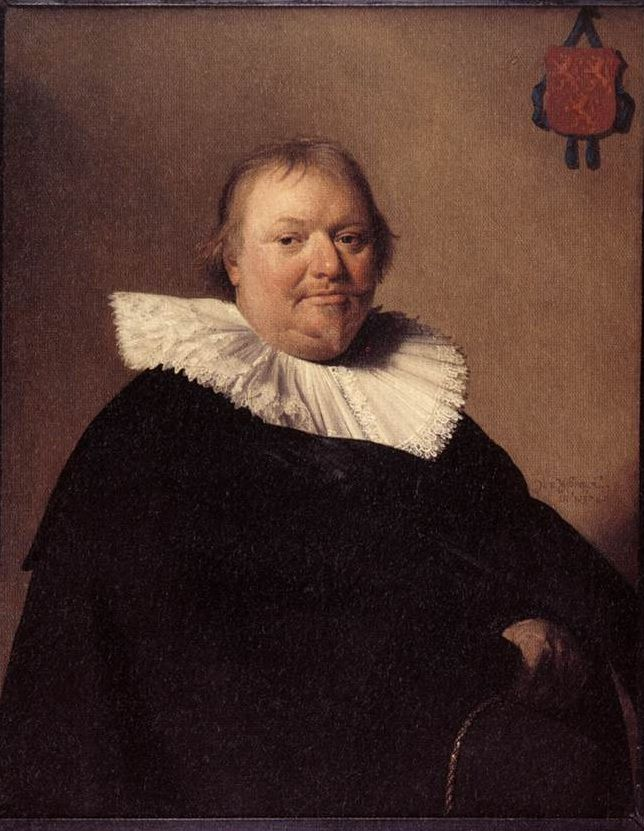

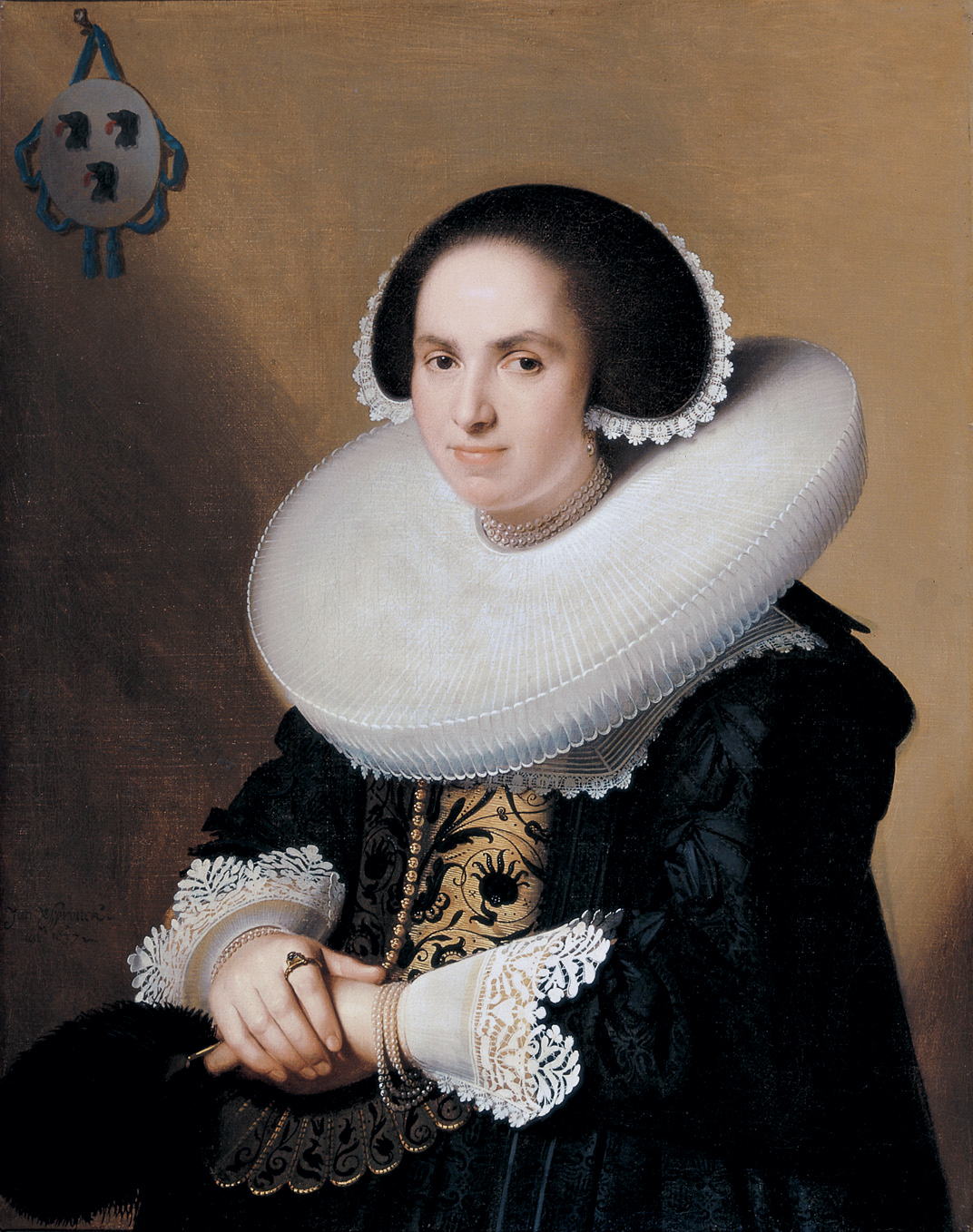

== See also ==
- Morocco–Netherlands relations
