= Adriaen Matham =

Dutch painter and engraver (1590–1660)

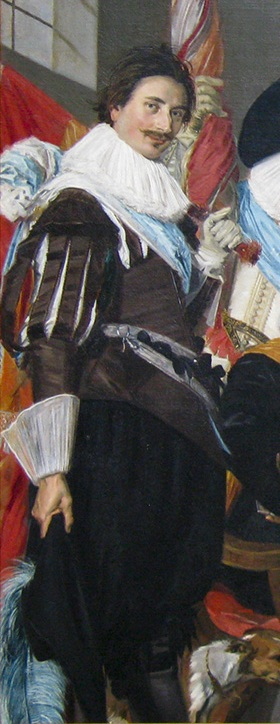
Detail of Schuttersstuk by Frans Hals in 1627 showing Adriaen Matham as ensign

Adriaen Matham (1590 – 1660) was a Dutch Golden Age painter, engraver and art dealer. He was part of an embassy to the Saadi dynasty of Morocco and also made some engravings while there. He married three times, once in Amsterdam and later lived in The Hague in the 1650s before his death.

== Biography ==
He was born in Haarlem as the son of the engraver Jacob Matham and his wife Marijtgen or Maria van Poelenburgh. He was the brother of the engravers Jan and Theodor Matham, and became a member of the Haarlem St. Adriaen civic guard from 1624 to 1627.

In 1620 he engraved a series of prints on the Counts of Holland that were only published after his death in 1663. He was painted by Frans Hals in his role as flag-bearer of the guard in 1627. He made drawings after Hals' paintings, most notably his sketch of a portrait of Isaac Massa (a merchant to Russia) and his sketch of Pieter van den Broecke.

In 1640, Matham was a member of a Dutch embassy to the king of Morocco, Mohammed esh Sheikh es Seghir, led by Antonius de Liedekerke. They were received by Jan Janszoon, a notorious pirate, who was visited by his daughter Lysbeth and her husband. Then the embassy visited the king in Marrakesh.

Adriaen Matham made a famous drawing and an engraving of the El Badi Palace, before it was destroyed. He also visited the harbour of Mogador in 1641, where he noted the presence of Jews, who were trading with the Netherlands and England. He made many sketches of fish that he saw on his travels. On his return journey to the Netherlands, he visited Madeira, with the crew of another ship on board, who had been kept in Morocco as slaves.

He lived in The Hague as an art dealer around the year 1654. Adriaen collaborated with or sold his work to the cartographer Joan Blaeu and worked for Adriaen van de Venne.

== Works ==
- Voyage dʹAdrien Matham au Maroc (1640–1641) by Adriaen Matham (compiled in French by Ferdinand de Hellwald).

== Gallery ==
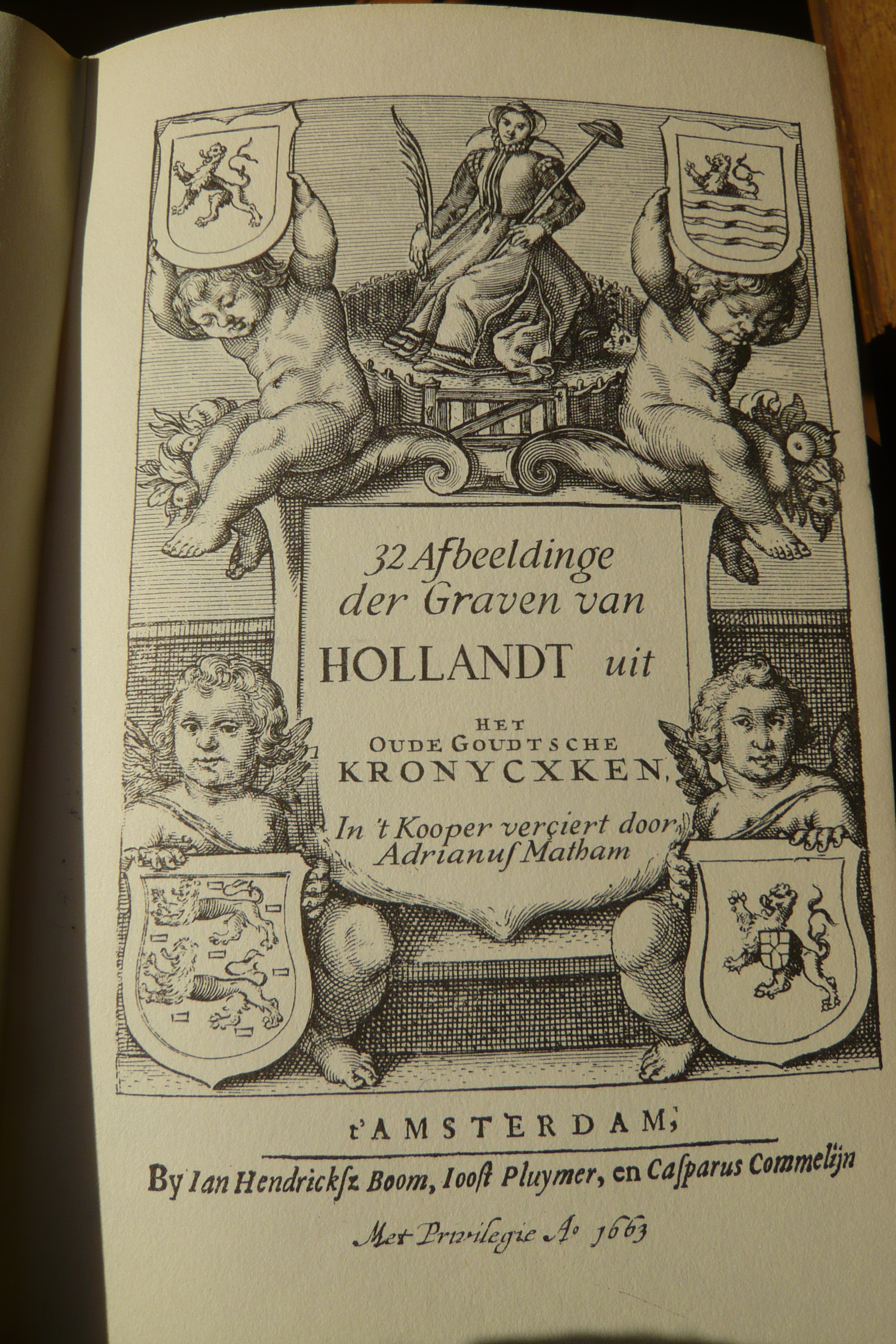
Titlepage of the Counts of Holland series (based on earlier work by Philips Galle and probably as a tribute, showing Galle's "Maiden Holland" at the top, 1663

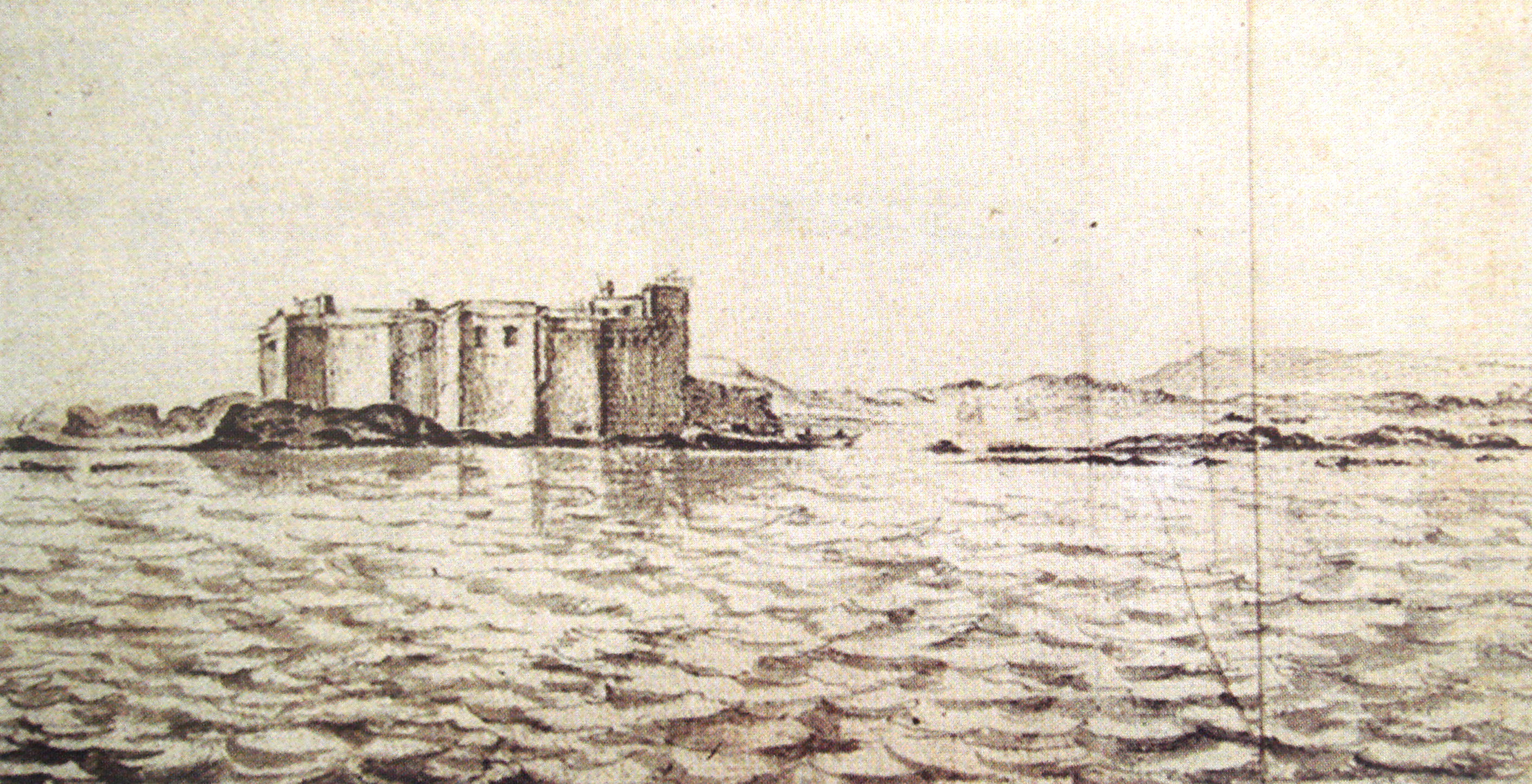
Castelo Real of Mogador, by Adriaen Matham, 1641

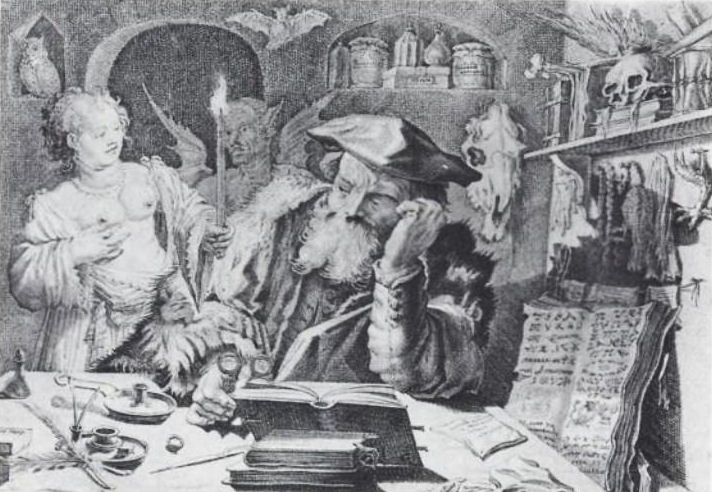
Temptress woman, devil, alchemist, by Adriaen Matham
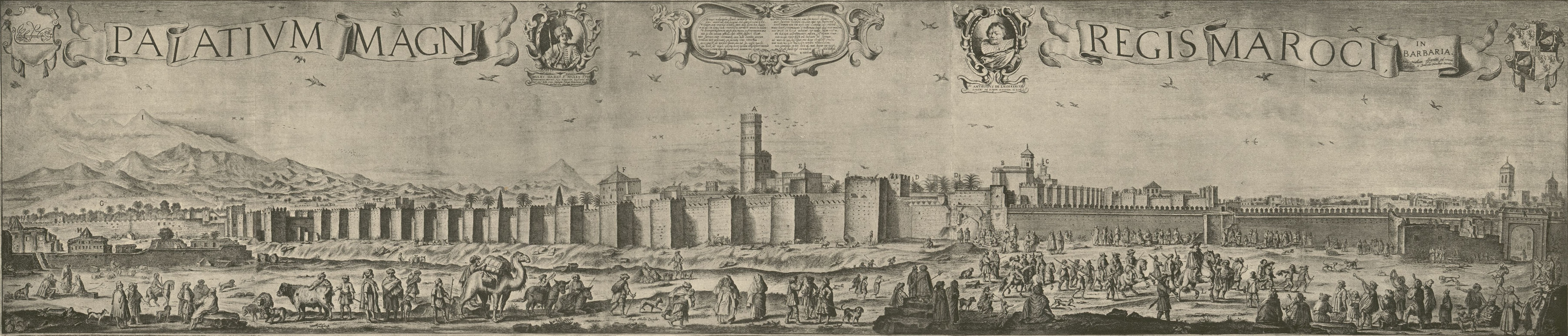
View of Marrakesh and El Badi Palace, by Adriaen Matham, 1640

== See also ==
- Morocco–Netherlands relations
