= Theodor Matham =

Dutch engraver

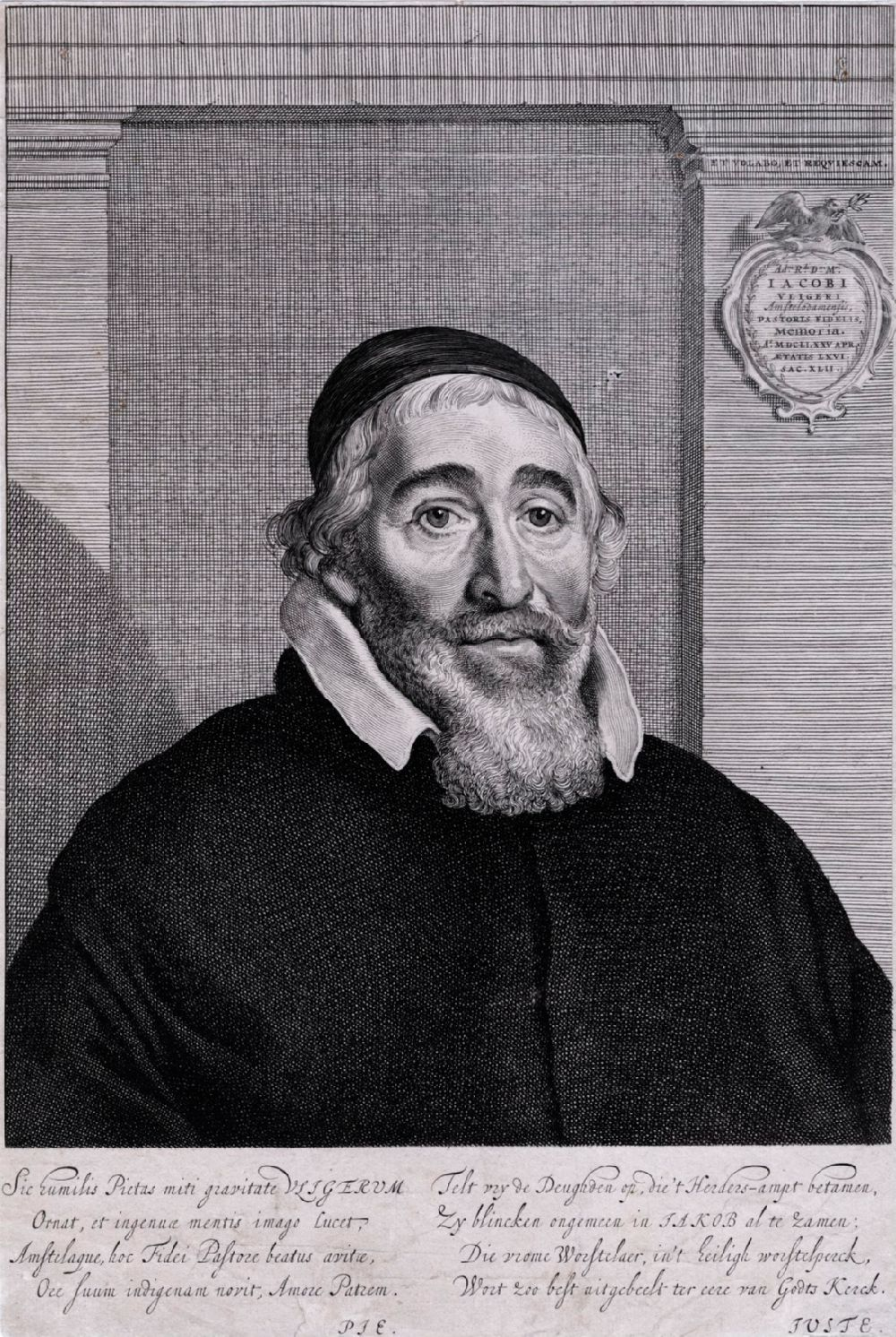
Theodor Matham, Jacob Vliger, c. 1651, engraving

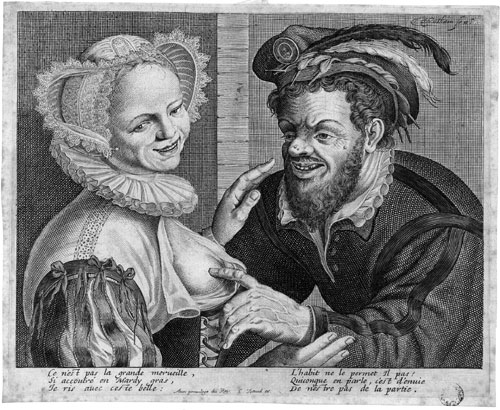
Theodor Matham, galant scene

Theodor Matham, also Theodoor Matham (born 1589) was a Dutch engraver. He was the younger son of the better known engraver Jacob Matham, and the brother of the engravers Jan and Adriaen Matham.

He was born in Haerlem. He went to Italy and studied under Cornelius Bloemaert, and then returned to Haerlem, where he engraved an important number of plates. He signed his plates T.M. fecit or T.M. sculpsit.
