= Jan Matham =

Dutch Golden Age painter

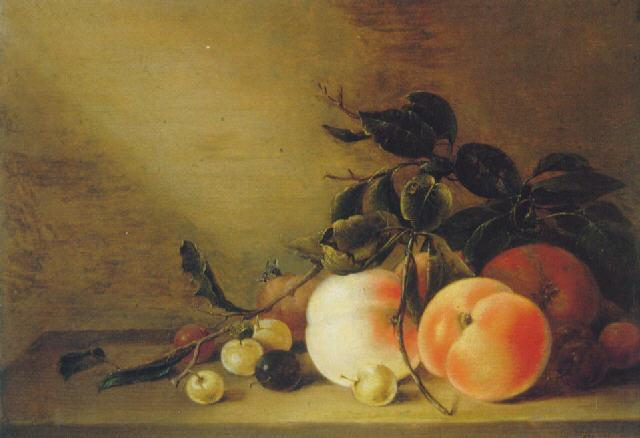
Still life with peaches by Jan Matham

Jan Matham (1600 in Haarlem – 1648 in The Hague), was a Dutch Golden Age painter.

According to the RKD, he was the son of Jacob Matham, brother of Theodor and Adriaen, and signed his works "JMatham F". He is known for fruit still lifes and engravings. He was a member of the Haarlem Guild of St. Luke in 1628 and in 1637.
