= Isaac Massa =

Dutch grain trader and diplomat (1586–1643)

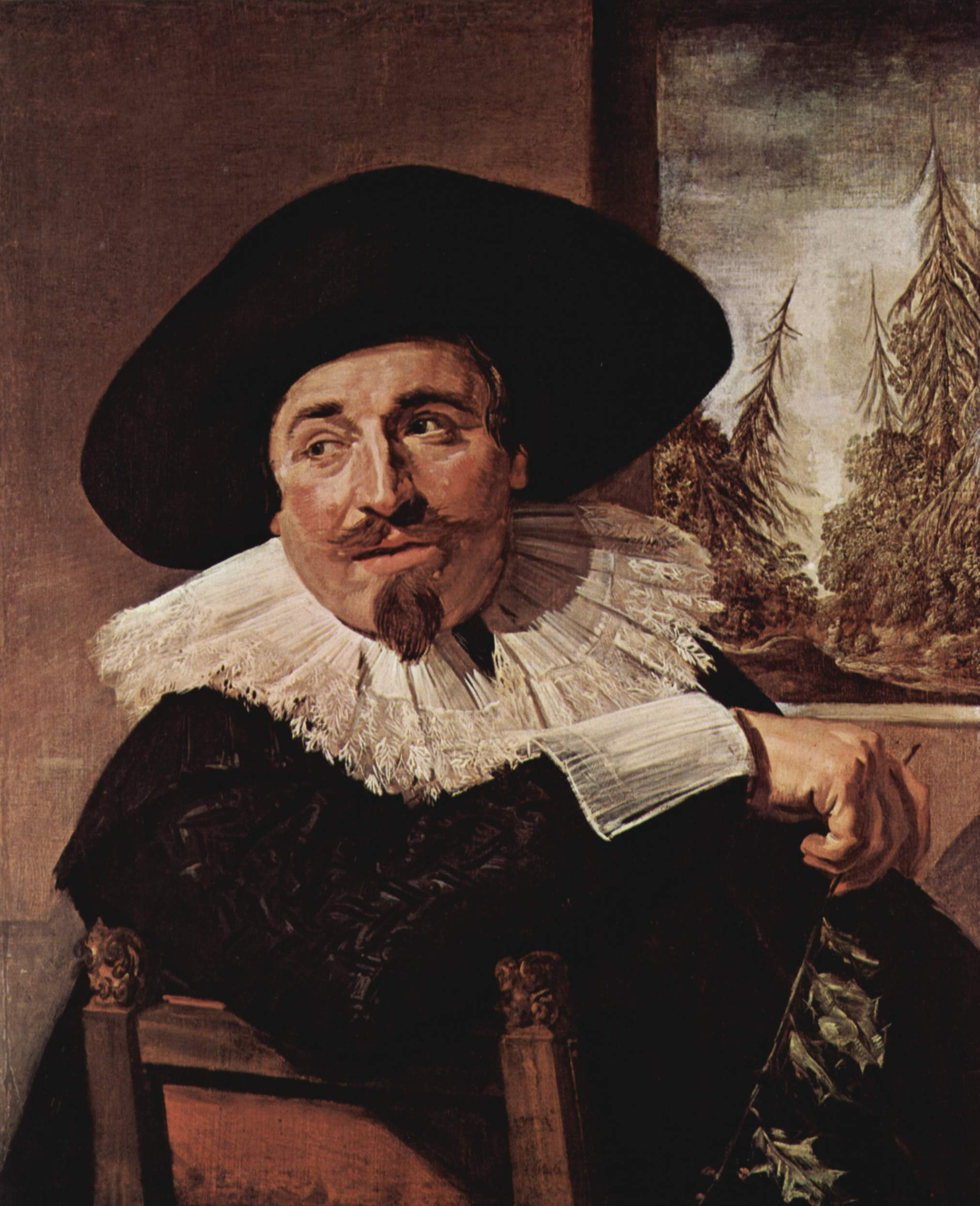
- Portrait by Frans Hals, 1626
- Born: October 7, 1586; Haarlem
- Died: 1643 (aged 56–57)
- Occupations: Merchant; diplomat; cartographer
- Known for: Embassy to Russia and memoirs of the Time of Troubles
- Spouse: Beatrix van der Laen

Isaac Abrahamszoon Massa (baptized October 7, 1586 – 1643) was a Dutch grain trader, traveller and envoy to Russia. He wrote memoirs related to the Time of Troubles and created some of the earliest maps of Eastern Europe and Siberia. Due to Massa's experience in and knowledge of Russia, he was valued by the Dutch States-General as a counterweight to growing English influence in Russia in the early seventeenth century. The Isaac Massa Foundation was established in his honor in Groningen. It aims to stimulate scientific and cultural contacts between Russia and the Netherlands.

== Biography ==
Isaac Massa was born in Haarlem into a wealthy silk merchant's family; his father Abraham Massa had relocated the family from Liège to Haarlem before Isaac was born. His ancestors could have been French Huguenots who fled their homeland in the beginning of the Reformation. The family surname was also known as Massart, Massaert, suggesting French origins, which is where most Huguenots started. Under religious persecution, they generally relocated to Protestant countries, such as England and those of northern Europe.

In 1601, Massa left Haarlem for Moscow to assist the family trade. Massa was witness to the second half of Boris Godunov's reign, during which a civil war broke out, now known as the Time of Troubles. He survived the capture of Moscow by False Dmitriy I and left Russia in 1609, before the fall of Tsar Vasily Shuysky.

Massa compiled an account of the 1601–1609 events (Dutch: Een cort Verhael van Begin en Oorspronk deser tegenwoordighe Oorloogen en troeblen in Moscovia totten jare 1610), which he presented to Stadtholder Maurice. It was reproduced in print in the nineteenth century. In 1612–1613 Massa published two articles on Russian events and the geography of the Land of Samoyeds, accompanied by a map of Russia, which were published in an almanac edited by Hessel Gerritsz. His notes on his various travels have been published in conjunction with maps made by the explorer Henry Hudson.

These articles were translated and reproduced anonymously in European languages, because the author's name was removed in early Dutch reissues. The most complete translations were published in Russian in 1937 (reissued in 1997) and in English in 1982. Massa's writing was based on an underlying religious concept of punishment for sins being indispensable. He believed that Godunov, False Dimitri, and the nation itself paid for their mortal sins. (Massa believed that Godunov killed Feodor I and the real Tsarevich Dimitri). Russian sources consider him the least biased of contemporary Western witnesses, and very well informed. (His contemporary, Jacob De la Gardie, characterized Massa as "extremely artful in learning other people's secrets").

Massa is credited with five published maps of Russia and its provinces, the last ones compiled around 1633, and two maps of Moscow city, including the schematic account of the 1606 battle between Vasily Shuysky and Ivan Bolotnikov's armies. Retrieving original maps of the city could have been dangerous for Massa himself and fatal for his Russian sources. Massa's rendition of the Siberian coast represented an advance in geography; for decades it was the only map of this region. It was subsequently copied by Gerardus Mercator and Jodocus Hondius, Jan Janssonius and Willem Blaeu.

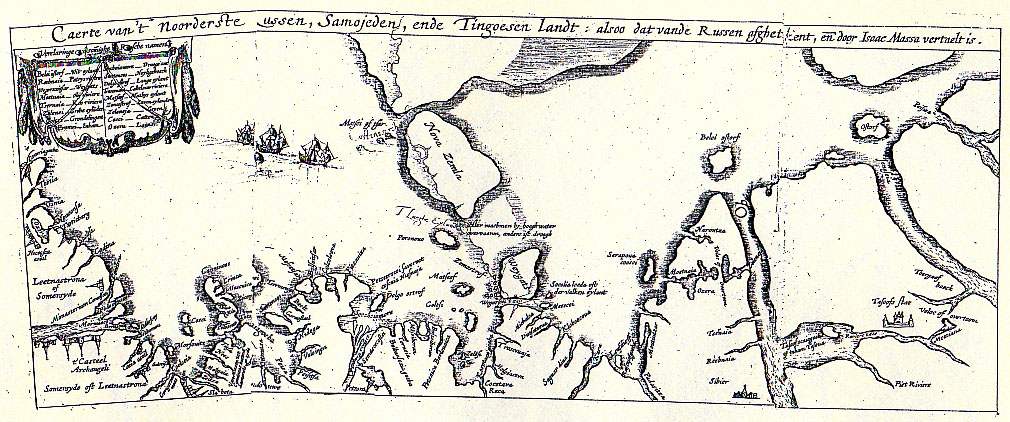
Map of the north of Russia, the land of the Samoyedic and Tunguz; with the Taz Estuary, Vaygach Island, Yamal and Gydan Peninsula

In 1614, Massa returned to Moscow, this time accompanied by his brothers, as an envoy of States-General of the Netherlands to obtain an exclusive trade agreement similar to the recent Dutch-Ottoman treaty, and to investigate the trade routes into Persia. Not only had the Dutch been keen to purchase grains but also Persian silks. These had, equally so, been exported via Arkhangelsk. At the time Russian people showed great interest in artillery compounds such as lead and gunpowder.

An average of thirty ships sailed each year to Arkhangelsk, a harbour near the White Sea – unfortunately during 1619 a fire broke out and destroyed the city completely, thereby ruining Massa's inventory. Additionally, upon his return Massa's ship encountered a heavy storm near Lapland.

In April 1622, he married Beatrix van der Laen, the daughter of a Remonstrant burgomaster. When Hals had a child baptized, Massa was a witness. In 1623–1624, Massa was called upon by the Dutch Parliament (Staten-Generaal) to become an agent for Russia. However, his appointment proved to be a controversial one and drew serious opposition. He then made successful efforts to gain the interest of Gustaf II Adolf of Sweden to pursue trading grains with Russia. While nourishing the relationships between Russia and Sweden, he was knighted by the Swedish King in 1625 for his arduous efforts. One year later, in 1626, he attempted to gain exclusive rights on the trading of grains out of Russia.

Massa promoted the idea of setting up a trading cartel similar to the English Muscovy Company, but internal problems in the Netherlands delayed consolidation of traders into 1628. During his next voyage, in 1629, he travelled to Moscow to pave the way for his friend Elias Trip who by then had initiated a consortium. Massa indiscreetly advised Michael I of Russia and Michael's father, Patriarch Philaret of Moscow, of the internal affairs of the Dutch Republic. By doing so he attempted to tarnish the reputation of his competitors and personal opponents.

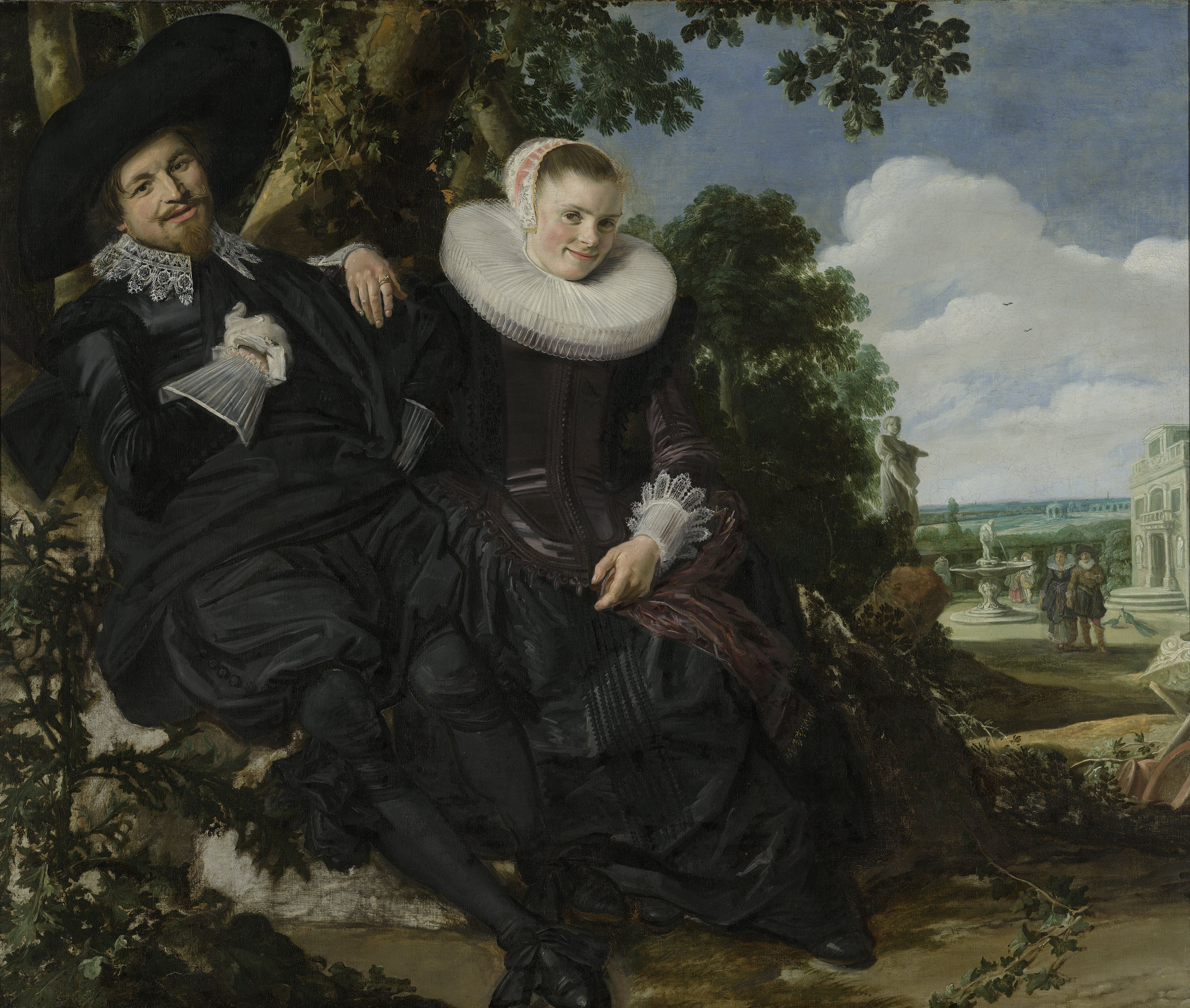
Portrait of Isaac Massa and his wife, Beatrix van der Laen by Frans Hals. Rijksmuseum, Amsterdam

Because of the ongoing war between Sweden and Poland, no grain could be exported through the city of Danzig. One of his opponents, Klenck, himself a wealthy merchant trading in caviar, was given Russia's permission to export ten or twelve cargo loads of rye meal. Meanwhile, Trip feigned to act on behalf of the Swedish Monarchy.

In 1630, the price of grain remained extremely high due to increasing competition. Albert Burgh tried to ensure a monopoly for the City of Amsterdam. At the same time, countries such as Sweden and England endeavoured to do the same. Russian merchants tried to curtail trading by limiting import and export exclusively via Arkhangelsk. For the next two decades Massa combined diplomatic service with his own business.

== Paintings by Frans Hals ==
Massa has been the subject of several portraits by Dutch painter Frans Hals, including a marriage portrait with his wife, Beatrix Van Der Laen, dated 1622, and a solo portrait of him leaning over the back of a chair dated 1626. The wedding portrait is considered unique in composition for the period. The novel composition, "picnic style", may have been Massa's own design. Massa owned a country house near Lisse, next to his brother-in-law, Adriaen Maertensz Block. He was the protector of Torrentius, a notorious painter from Haarlem.

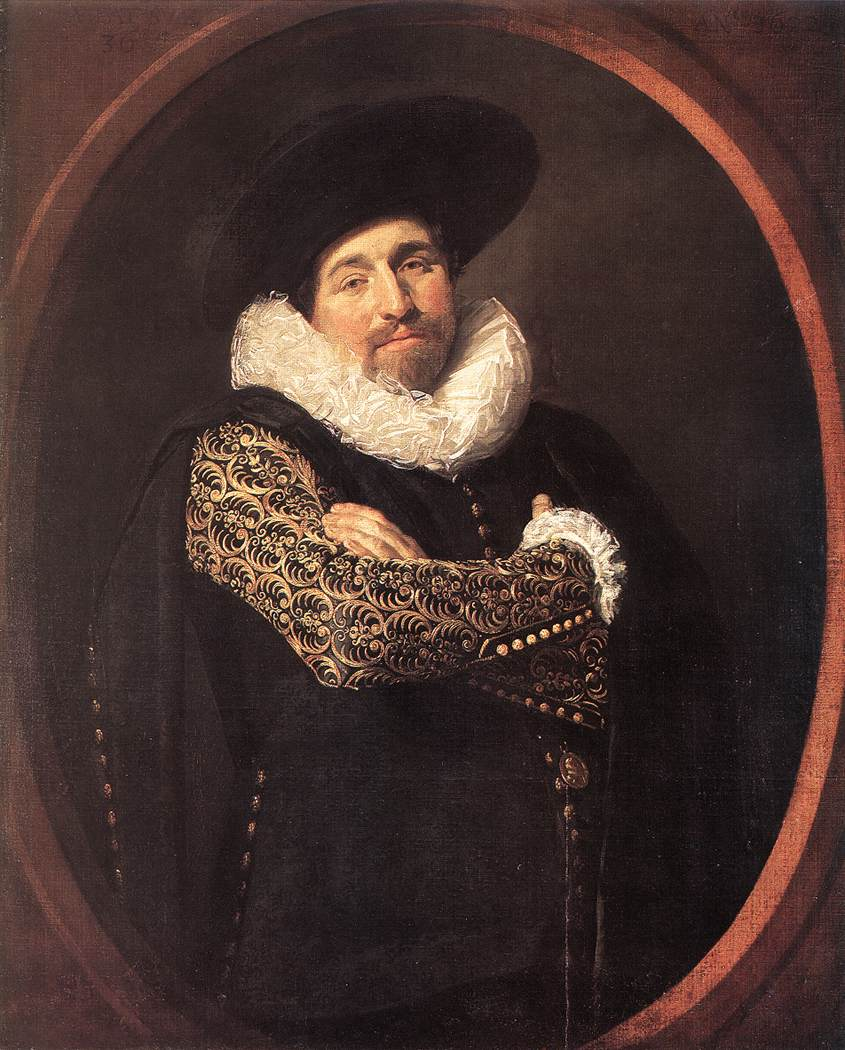
Hals portrait also considered to be of Massa

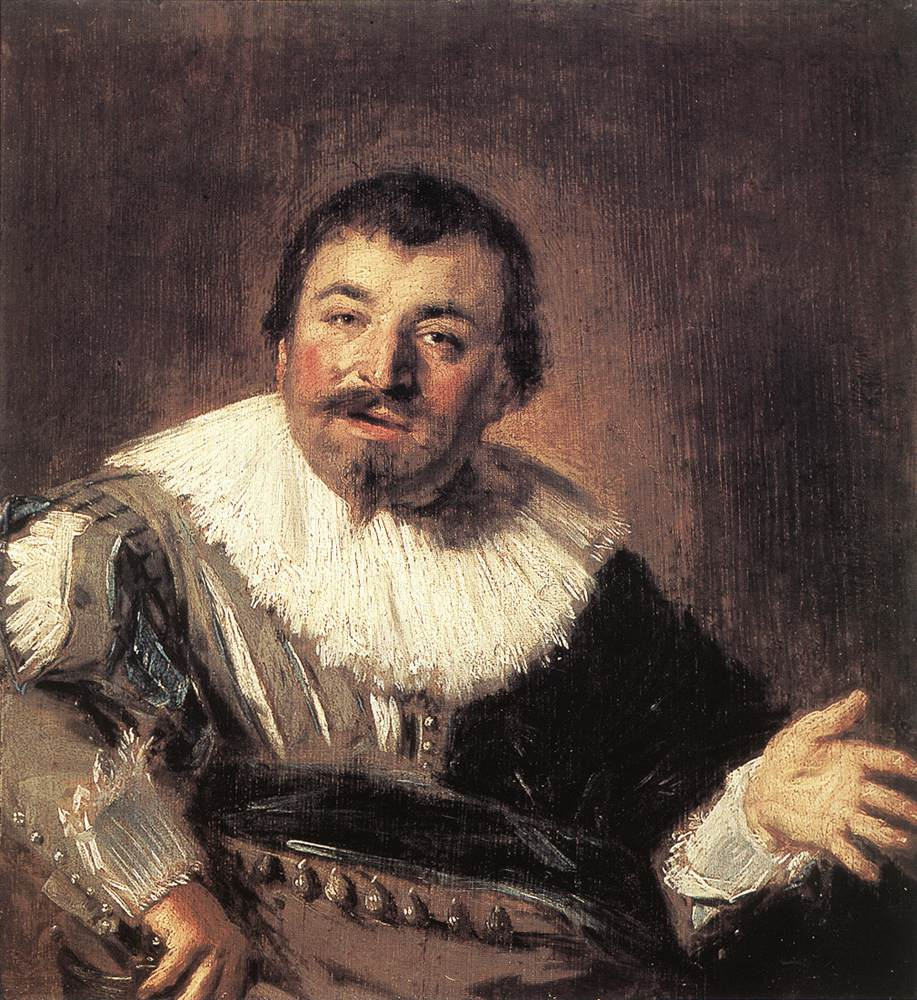
Hals portrait of Massa according to an engraving

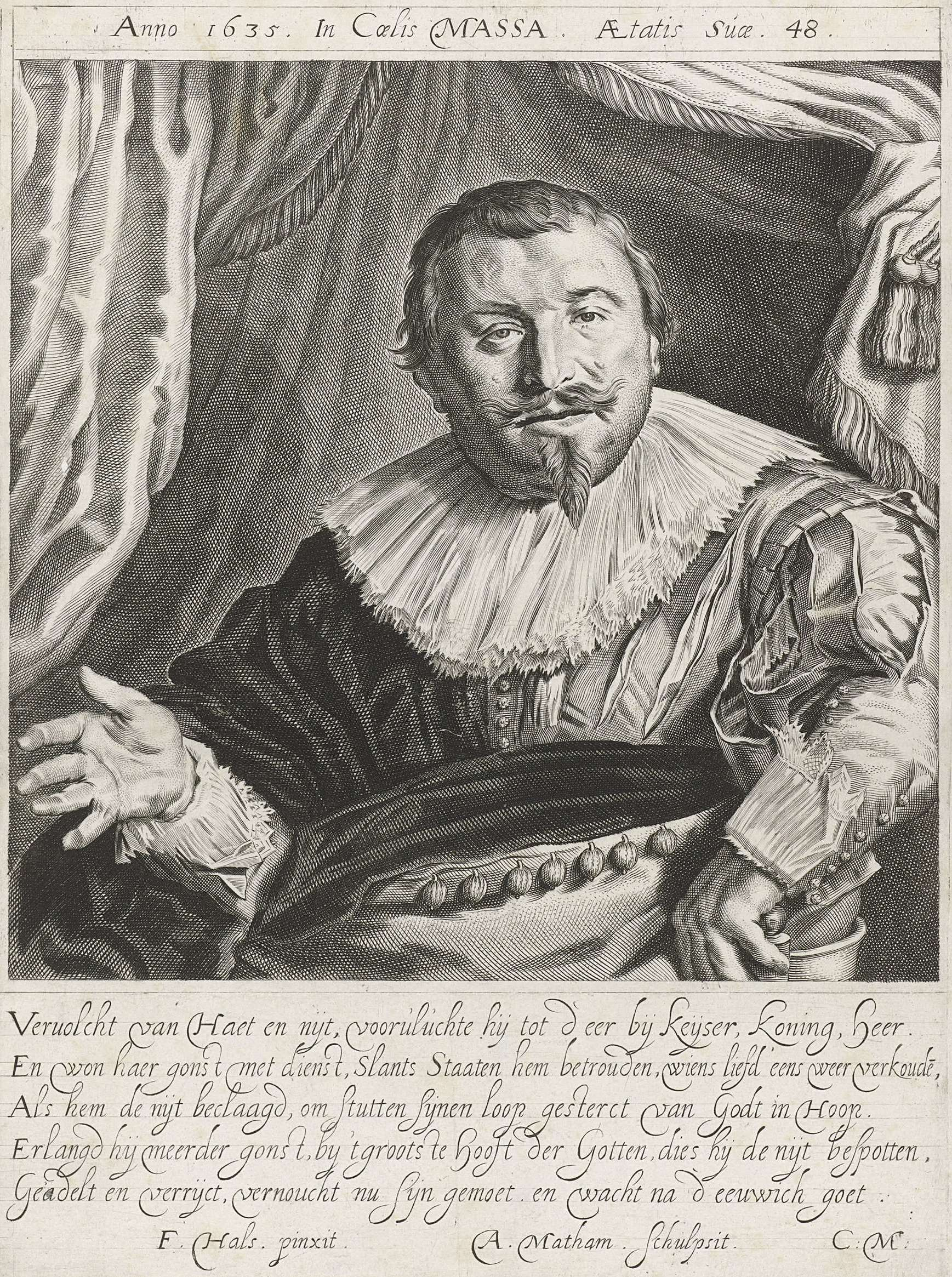
The engraving by Adriaen Matham

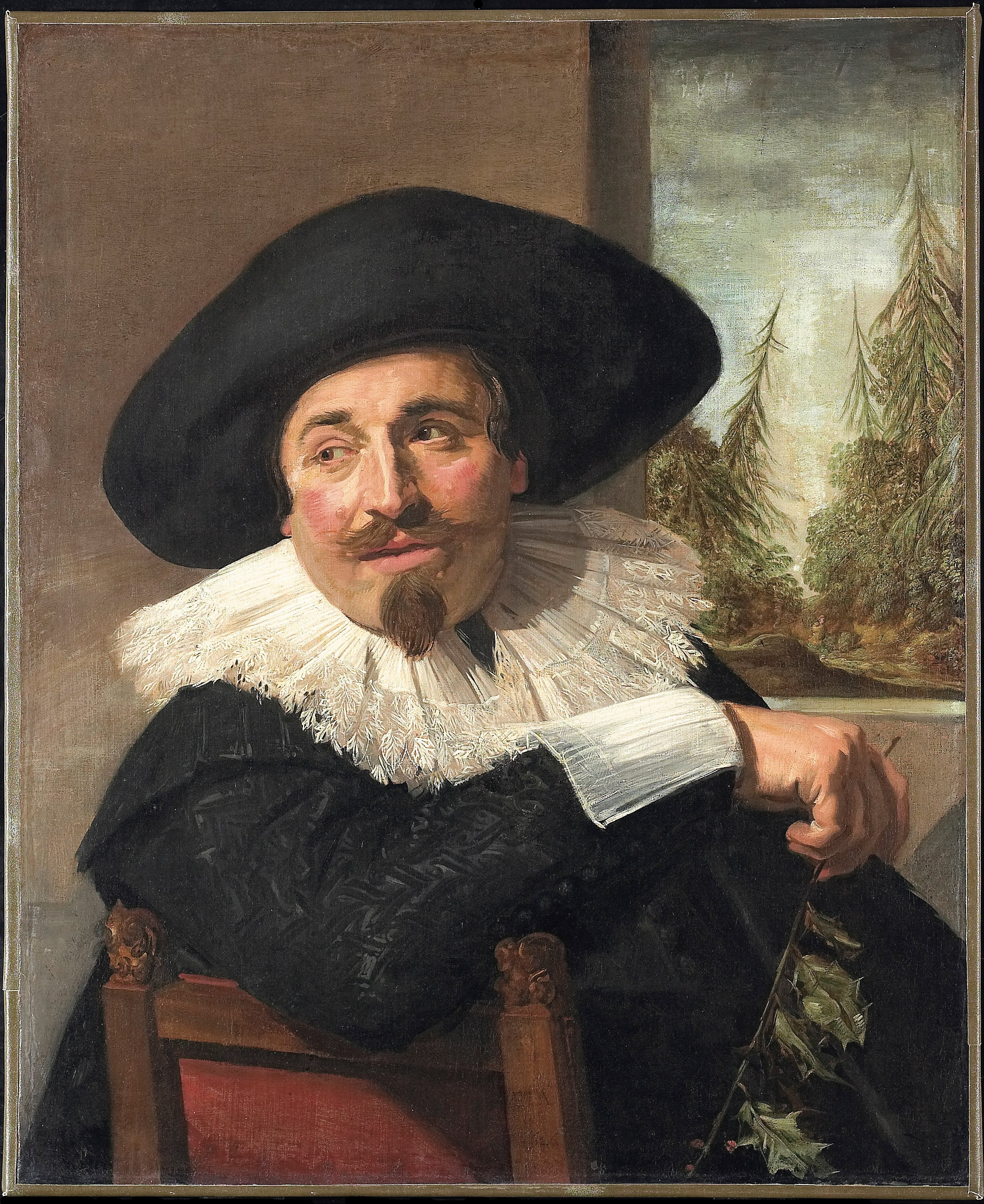
The solo portrait

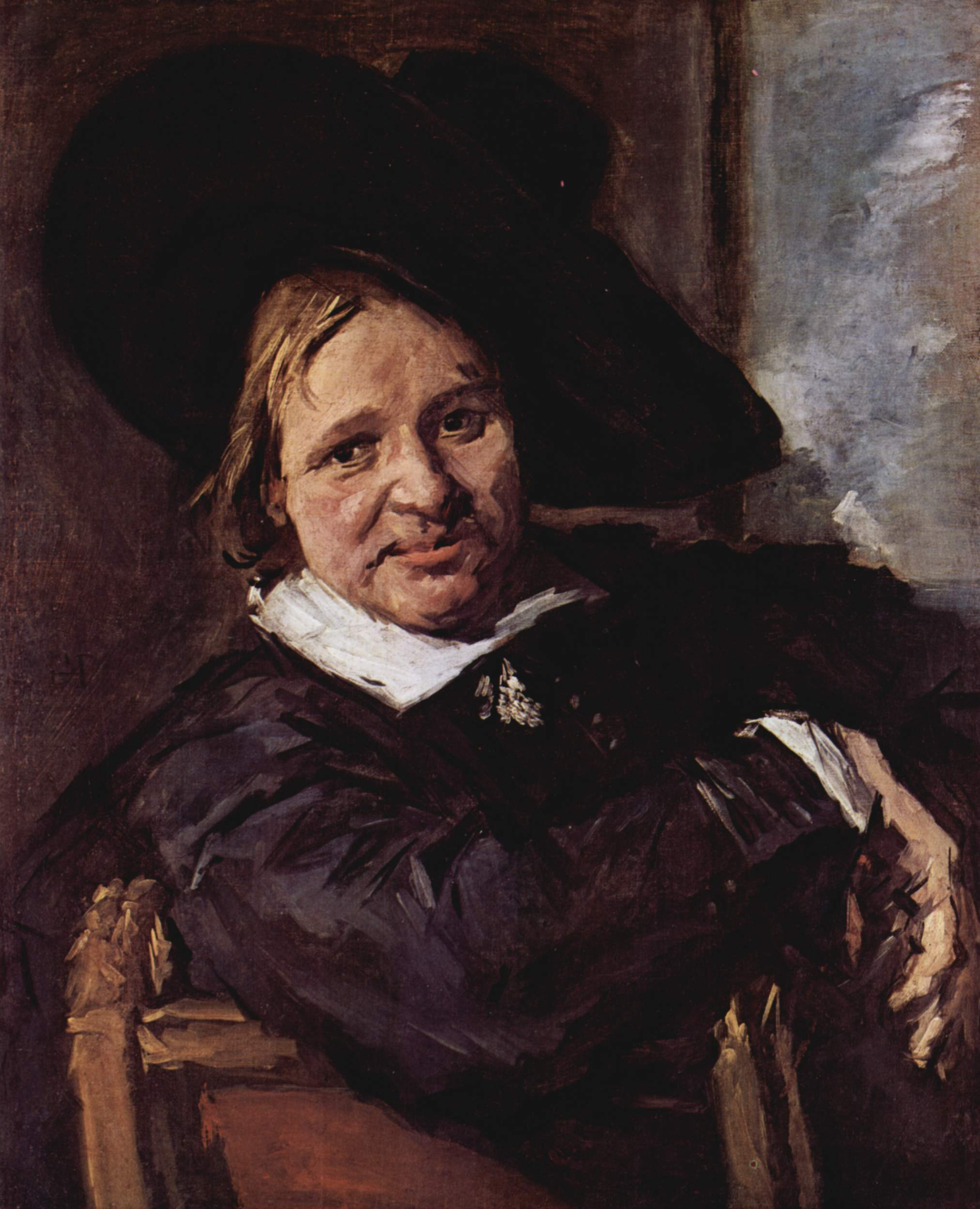
Same composition later in life

== Sources ==
- "Масса, Исаак" . Brockhaus and Efron Encyclopedic Dictionary (in Russian). 1906.
