= Jacob Matham =

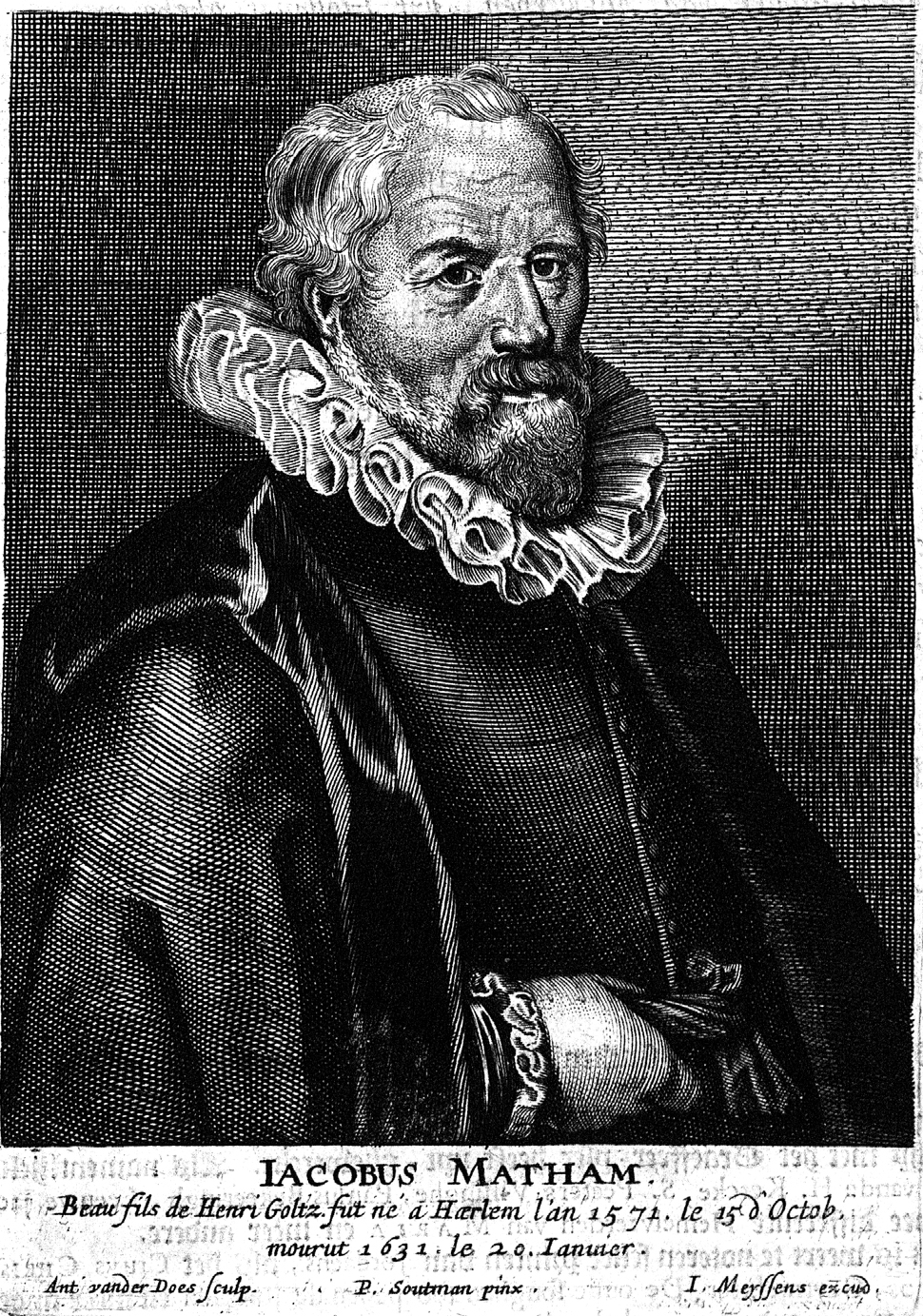
Portrait of Jacob Matham in Het Gulden Cabinet, engraving by Antony van der Does

Jacob Matham (15 October 1571 – 20 January 1631), of Haarlem, was an engraver and pen-draftsman.

== Biography ==
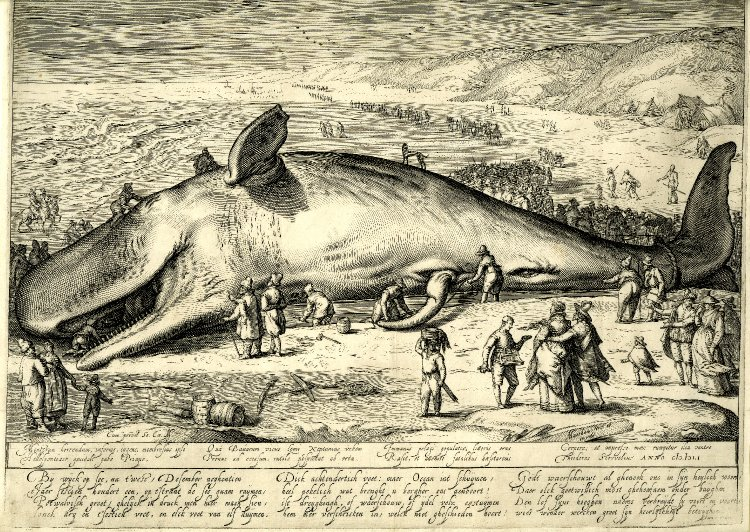
Engraving of a beached whale, after Hendrik Goltzius.

He was the stepson and pupil of painter and draftsman Hendrik Goltzius, and brother-in-law to engraver Simon van Poelenburgh, having married his sister, Marijtgen. He made several engravings after the paintings of Peter Paul Rubens from 1611 to 1615, and also a series after the work of Pieter Aertsen. In 1613, engraver Jan van de Velde was apprenticed to him. He was the father of Jan, Theodor and Adriaen Matham, the latter of whom was a notable engraver in his own right.
