= Willemina van Braeckel =

17th-century Dutch woman

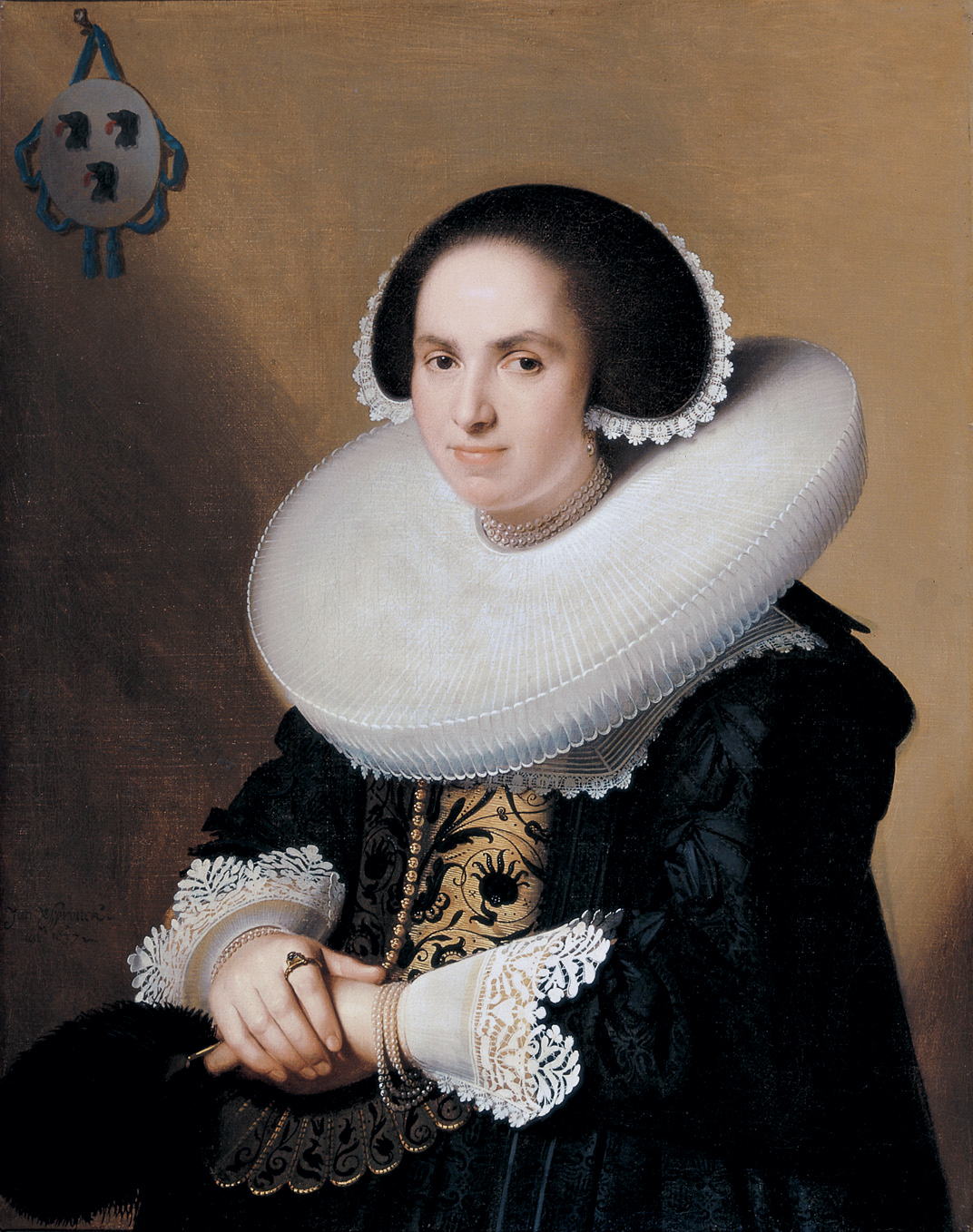
Wilhelmina van Braeckel (1604/5 - c1670) painted in 1637 by Johannes Cornelisz Verspronck.

Wilhelmina van Braeckel (c. 1604-1605 – c. 1670) was a wealthy 17th century Dutch woman who lived during the time of the Dutch Republic, known as the subject of paintings.

She was born to Pieter Aertse van Braeckel (b. 1585) and his wife Arendje van Offenbergh in Haarlem / Amsterdam, Netherlands around 1604 or 5 . Wilhelmina had 3 siblings.

In 1627 she married Antonius de Liedekercke (b. 1587) in Amsterdam. He was 17 years her senior and a successful Dutch sea captain who became the Dutch ambassador to Morocco.

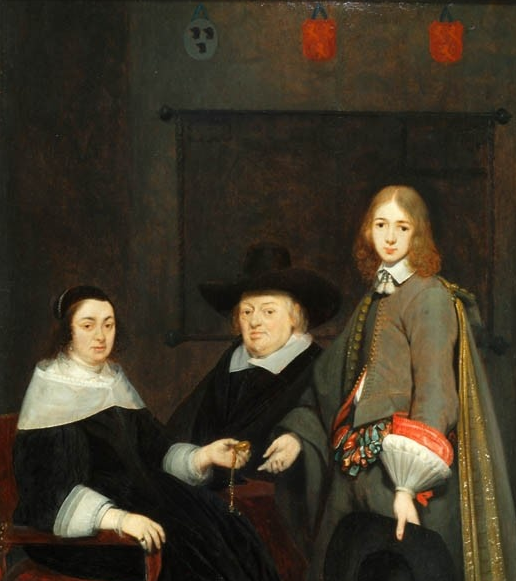
Willemina van Braeckel, with her husband Antonius de Liedekerke and their son Samuel, painted early 1650s by Gerard ter Borch (1617–1681)

She is noted for her portrait of 1637, the tenth anniversary year or her wedding, painted by Johannes Cornelisz Verspronck and which is now in the Frans Halls Museum in Haarlem. It was donated to the museum in 1883 as part of a legacy left to the town by one Fabricius van Leyenburg.

In her portrait, she displays her status and wealth by wearing an oversize starched ruff, lace cuffs, pearl necklace and a jeweled wedding ring. She wears the wedding ring on her right index finger. At that time a wedding ring could be worn on any finger, even the thumb. Willemina wears expensive clothes and has a fan in her hand. The portrait is part of a pair, the other depicts her husband. Her family coat of arms is shown pinned to the wall in the top left of the portrait where it would be next to her husbands when the pair are hung together.

The couple, at the time of the portraits, lived in Haarlem. She had 2 children: Samuel de Liedekercke (b. 1638), who is shown in a later family portrait c. 1650 by the artist Gerard ter Borch, and one other child.
