= Marriage Portrait of Isaac Massa and Beatrix van der Laen =

Painting by Frans Hals

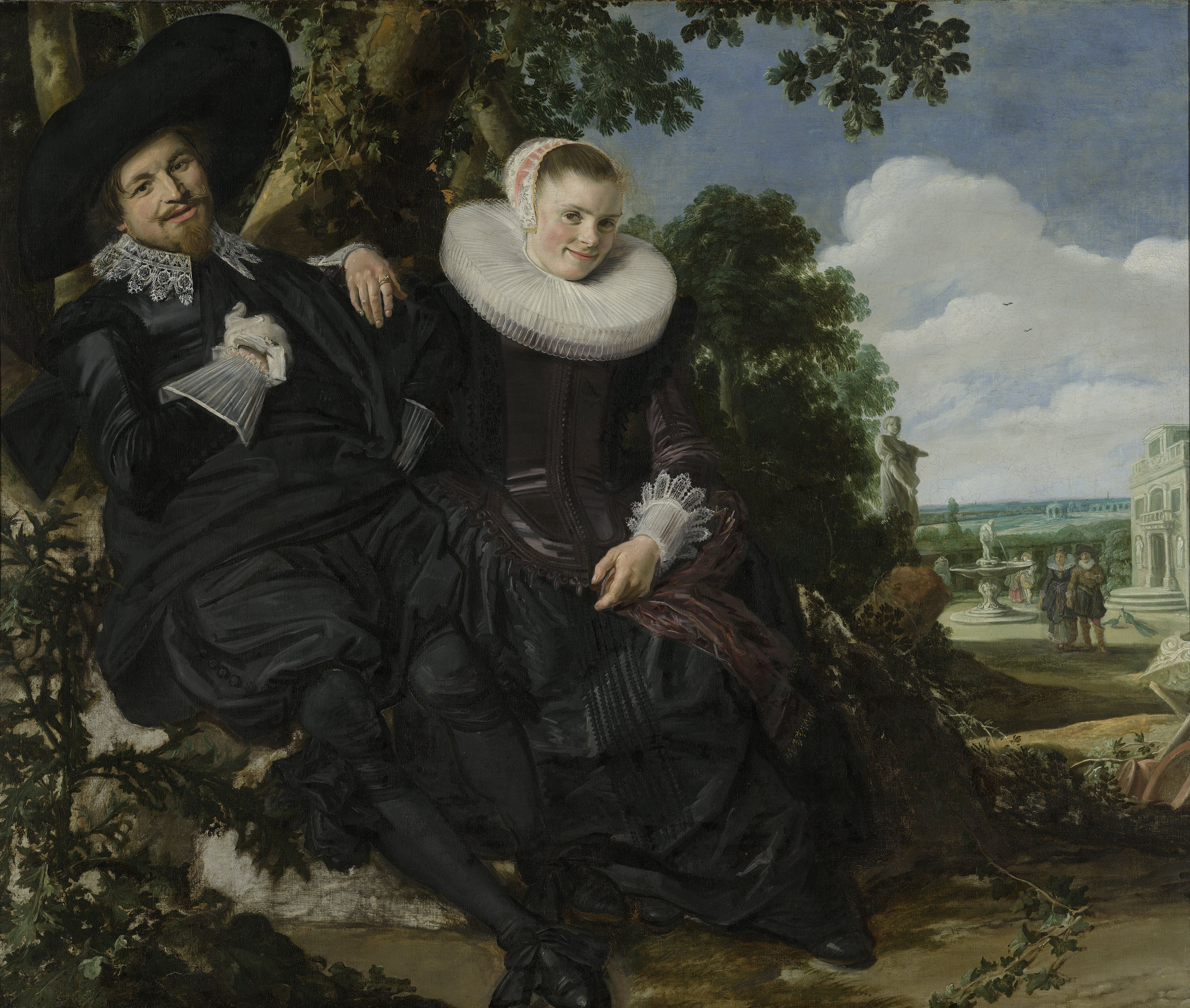
- Artist: Frans Hals
- Year: c. 1622
- Catalogue: Seymour Slive, Catalog 1974: #17
- Medium: Oil on canvas
- Dimensions: 140 cm × 166.5 cm (55 in × 65.6 in)
- Location: Rijksmuseum, Amsterdam
- Accession: SK-A-133
- Website: rijksmuseum.nl/en/collection/SK-A-133

Marriage Portrait of Isaac Massa and Beatrix van der Laen is a painting by the Dutch Golden Age painter Frans Hals, painted c. 1622. It is held in the Rijksmuseum, in Amsterdam. The couple has been identified as Isaac Massa and his bride Beatrix van der Laen.

== Painting ==
The painting shows a happy couple sitting against a tree "picnic-style", with a garden scene in the distance. They smile at the viewer and look more relaxed than amorous. As was the convention in married-couple portraits, the man is positioned to the left of his wife. That convention was reversed for courting (that is, unmarried) couples like the two couples strolling in the background.

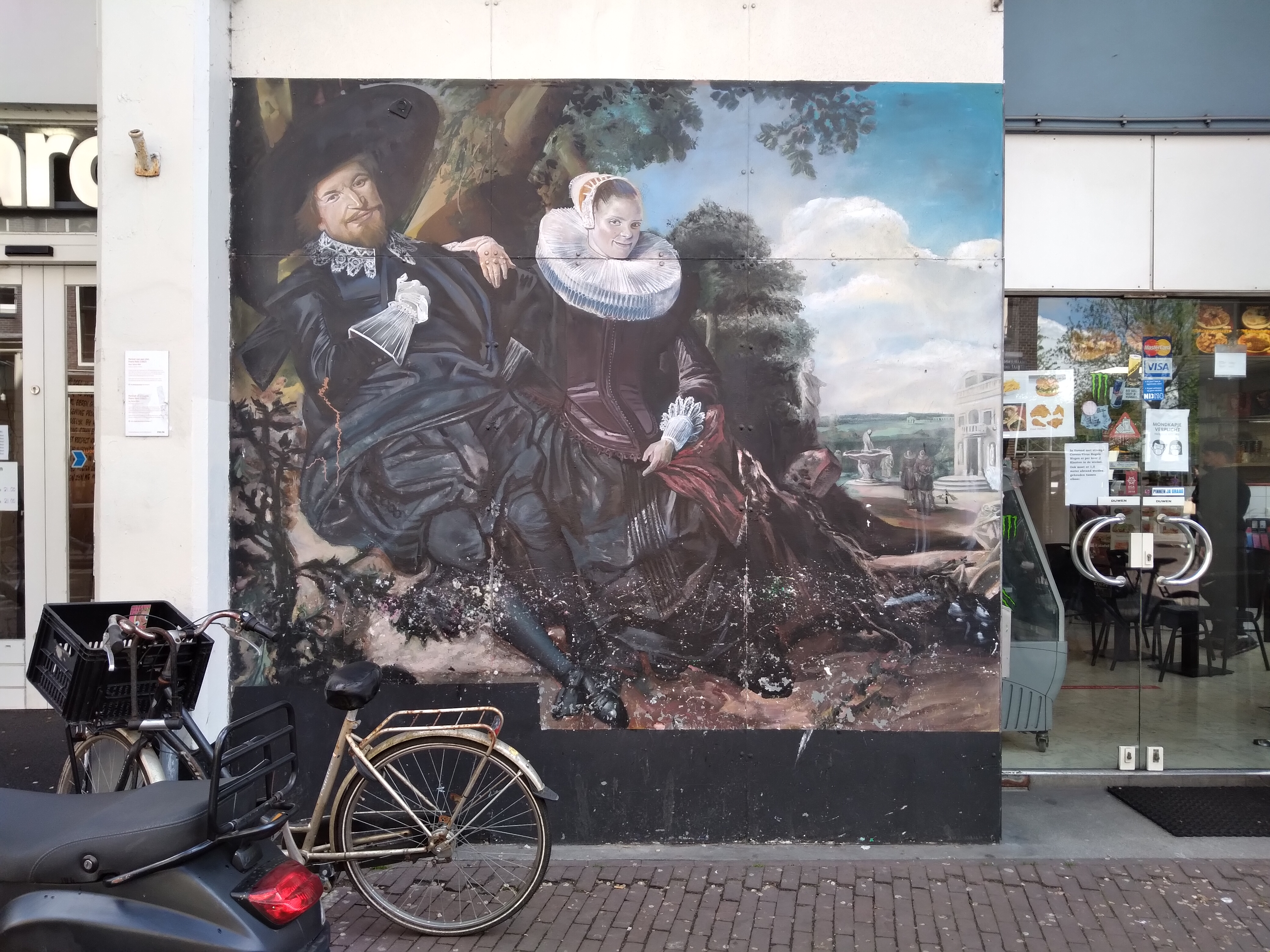
Mural at Haarlemmerstraat 141, Amsterdam

== Name ==
In his 1910 catalogue of Frans Hals works Hofstede de Groot wrote:

427. A MARRIED COUPLE. B. 15; M. 90. In a garden a gentleman sits in the left foreground smiling at the spectator. His right hand is at his breast; his left hand is pressed to his side. He has a moustache and a small pointed beard. He wears a broad-brimmed black felt hat, a black silk costume with a lace collar and fine linen wristbands. Beside him to the right sits a woman, bending slightly forward, with her head turned three-quarters left. She smiles rather slyly at the spectator. Her right hand rests on the man's left shoulder; her left hand is in her lap. She wears a black dress under a dark-purple gown, a ruff, a white cap threaded with a pink ribbon, and lace-trimmed wristbands. Behind the couple are trees. To the right is a park with merry-making couples, a building, a fountain, and a statue. It was wrongly supposed to represent Frans Hals and his wife. Canvas, 58 inches by 67 1/2 inches. Sales. J. Six, Amsterdam, April 6, 1702 (bought in). H. Six van Hillegom, Amsterdam, November 25, 1851, No. 15. In the Rijksmuseum, Amsterdam, 1907 catalogue, No. 1084.

== See also ==
- List of paintings by Frans Hals
