= Pride and Joy: Children's Portraits in the Netherlands, 1500–1700 =

Pride and Joy: Children's Portraits in the Netherlands, 1500–1700 (Dutch: Kinderen op hun mooist: het kinderportret in de Nederlanden 1500-1700), was an exhibition held jointly by the Frans Hals Museum in Haarlem and the Royal Museum of Fine Arts, Antwerp, over several months in 2000–2001. It was the first exhibition with a particular focus on images of childhood from the early-modern Low Countries.

The exhibition catalog included detailed discussions of 85 paintings from various collection holders, that together give an overview of four basic aspects of daily life in 17th-century portraits of children and families from the Low Countries: family values, educating children, children at play, and children's fashions. The English translation of the catalogue was published in 2001.

Since children's portraits are often quite popular, the exhibition was restricted by rules governing insurance and loans of popular pieces. The introduction to the catalog discusses and reproduces several paintings that could not be exhibited. The Rijksmuseum Amsterdam however was able to loan 11 works for the exhibition. The catalog is organized loosely by time period, starting with the earliest works.

image	Article	Painter	Date	Collection	Inventory number	Catalog code
	Filips de Schone als jongeling	Master of the Legend of the Magdalen	1493	Huis Bergh		1
	Little girl with a dead bird	anonymous	1510s	Royal Museums of Fine Arts of Belgium	4434	2
	Three children of King Christian II of Denmark	Jan Gossaert	1525	Royal Collection	RCIN 405782	3
	Portrait of a Young Scholar	Jan van Scorel	1531	Museum Boijmans Van Beuningen	1797 (OK)	4
	Adriaan van Santvoort and his Sons Guillaume and Adriaan	Bernaert de Rijckere	1563	private collection		5
	Anna van Hertsbeke and her Daughter Catharina and Son Jan Baptiste	Bernaert de Rijckere	1563	private collection		6
	Little Girl with a Basket of Cherries	anonymous	1575	National Gallery	NG6161	7
	Portrait of a boy aged two	Jacob Willemsz Delff	1581	Rijksmuseum	SK-A-1907	8
	Hilleke de Roy and 4 of her Orphans	anonymous	1586	private collection		9
	Six-year-old Girl holding a Cherry	Jan Claesz.	1594	Rijksmuseum Twenthe	130	10
	Portrait of Catharina van Warmondt	Isaac van Swanenburg	1596	Museum Meermanno	16/31	11
	Portrait of Hector van Bouricius	Hans Hansz. de Clercq	1599	Fries Museum	1950-63	12
	Double Portrait of a Brother and Sister	Cornelis Ketel	1600	Museum Mayer van den Bergh	19	13
	Five-year-old Boy holding a Pony	Jan Claesz.	1609	Stichting Verzameling Semeijns de Vries van Doesburgh		14
	Girl with Rattle	Jan Claesz.	1609	Fries Museum	1962-81	15
	A child with bird	Peter Paul Rubens	1625	Gemäldegalerie	GG763	16
	Boy with Colf Stick	anonymous	1615	Markiezenhof	3065	17
	Portrait of a girl, known as 'The Little Princess'	Paulus Moreelse	1623	Rijksmuseum	SK-A-277	18
	Quadruplets of Dordrecht	anonymous	1621	Dordrechts Museum	DM-986-639	19
	Two Girls	Paulus Moreelse	1622	Centraal Museum; Nederlands Kunstbezit (NK)	10240	20
	Girl – 1623	Paulus Moreelse	1623	National Gallery of Ireland	NGI.263	21
	Magdalena de Vos	Cornelis de Vos	1623	private collection		22
	Girl at a Virginal	Cornelis de Vos	1624	private collection		23
	Susanna de Vos	Cornelis de Vos	1627	Städel	763	24
	Portrait of Anthony Reyniers and His Family	Cornelis de Vos	1631	Philadelphia Museum of Art	W1902-1-22	25
	Joannes de Ruyter (ca. 1627–1678)	Jan Antonisz. van Ravesteyn	1632	private collection		26
	Portrait of a Boy in Gray	Jacob Adriaensz Backer	1634	Mauritshuis	747	27
	Family Group as Cornelia, Mother of the Gracchi, Showing Her Children – c.1635	Jan van Bijlert	1635	Musée des Beaux-Arts d'Orléans	MO1500	28
	Portrait of Jacob (1627), Elisabeth (1629–1678) and Cornelia Francken (1633)	Jacob Gerritsz. Cuyp	1635	Dordrechts Museum		29
	Portrait of Willem Van Loon (later mayor of Amsterdam), aged 2 1/2	Dirck van Santvoort	1636	Museum Van Loon		30
	Two children with a lamb	Jacob Gerritsz. Cuyp	1638	Wallraf-Richartz Museum		31
	Family portrait with three cradles	anonymous	1638	Stichting Verzameling Semeijns de Vries van Doesburgh		32
	Portrait of a boy	Willem van der Vliet	1638	Rijksmuseum	SK-A-2577	33
	Grandmother with Granddaughter – 1639	Jacob Adriaensz Backer	1638	private collection		34
	Girl by a High Chair	Govert Flinck	1640	Mauritshuis	676	35
	A Girl as Flora – c. 1640	Govert Flinck	1640	Museum of Fine Arts of Nantes		36
	Hieronymus and Frederik Adolf van Tuyll van Serooskerken – 1641	Gerard van Honthorst	1641	M.A.O.C. Gravin van Bylandt Stichting		37
	Portrait of a Girl Dressed in Blue	Johannes Cornelisz Verspronck	1641	Rijksmuseum	SK-A-3064	38
	Group of four children – 1641	Pieter Soutman	1641	private collection		39
	Boy in White – c. 1641	Dirck van Santvoort	1641	private collection		40
	Boy with a Spoon	Bartholomeus van der Helst	1643	private collection		41
	A Boy as Cupid – 1644	Bartholomeus van der Helst	1644	private collection		42
	Martinus Alewijn (1634–84). Sun od Abraham Alewijn and Geertruid Hooftman	Dirck van Santvoort	1644	Rijksmuseum	SK-A-1310	43
	Clara Alewijn (1635–74). Daughter of Abraham Alewijn and Geertruid Hooftman	Dirck van Santvoort	1644	Rijksmuseum	SK-A-1311	44
	Portrait of a Girl	Pieter van Lint	1645	Royal Museum of Fine Arts Antwerp (KMSKA)	884	45
	A child's deathbed portrait	Bartholomeus van der Helst	1645	Nederlands Kunstbezit (NK)	NK 2692	46
	Four-year-old Girl with Cat and Fish	Jacob Gerritsz. Cuyp	1647	private collection		47
	Portrait of Helena van der Schalcke	Gerard ter Borch	1648s	Rijksmuseum	SK-A-1786	48
	Michiel Pompe van Slingelandt (1643–1685)	Jacob Gerritsz. Cuyp	1649	Dordrechts Museum	DM/953/373	49
	Portrait of an 11-year-old Boy	Jacob van Oost	1650	National Gallery	NG1137	50
	Saint Agnes and Saint Dorothea	Michaelina Wautier; Thomas Willeboirts Bosschaert	1650s	Royal Museum of Fine Arts Antwerp (KMSKA); Flemish Art Collection	599	51
	Girl as Shepherdess	Jan Baptist Weenix	1650	musée de Picardie		52
	Boy	Johannes Cornelisz Verspronck	1650s	private collection		53
	Portrait of a Boy	Jan Fyt; Erasmus Quellinus II	1650s	Royal Museum of Fine Arts Antwerp (KMSKA); Flemish Art Collection	407	54
	Boy with a Top and Dog	Jacob van Loo	1650s	private collection		55
	Portrait of Josina Copes-Schade van Westrum and Her Children – c. 1651	Theodoor van Thulden	1651	North Brabant Museum	9.740	56
	Portrait of a boy with a billygoat	Jan Albertsz Rotius	1652	Rijksmuseum	SK-A-995	57
	Willem van den Kerckhoven and his Family	Johannes Mytens	1652	Haags Historisch Museum		58
	Christina Lepper de Kempenaer and Her Children	Jan Baptist Weenix	1653	private collection		59
	Boy Sleeping in a High Chair	Johannes Cornelisz Verspronck	1654	private collection		60
	Portrait of Frederika, Edzard Jacob and Lambert Tjarda van Starkenborgh	Jan de Stomme	1654	Groninger Museum	1940.0199	61
	William III (1650–1702), prince of Orange, as a child	Adriaen Hanneman	1654	Rijksmuseum	SK-A-3889	62
	Portrait of a Six-year-old Boy	Jan de Bray	1654	Mauritshuis	808	63
	Otto van der Waeyen in a Polish Costume	Ferdinand Bol	1656	Museum Boijmans Van Beuningen	1071 (OK)	64
	Portrait of a Boy holding a Basket of Fruit	Jan de Bray	1658	Museum of Fine Arts	1992.475	65
	Boy Training his Dog	Ludolf Leendertsz de Jongh	1661	Virginia Museum of Fine Arts		66
	Willem Woutersz Oorthoorn in a Goat-Cart	Gerbrand van den Eeckhout	1662	private collection		67
	the Goubau-Children: Alexander IV Goubau, Lord of Mespelaere, (1658–1712), Joannes V Cornelis Goubau, (1660–1702), and Maria-Aldegonda Goubau	Justus van Egmont	1663	private collection		68
	Margarita Trip as Minerva, Instructing her Sister Anna Maria Trip	Ferdinand Bol	1663	Rijksmuseum	SK-A-46	69
	A Four-year-old Girl with a Pot of Carnations	Jan Albertsz Rotius	1663	Art Gallery of Ontario		70
	Family Portrait of Braems-Van der Laen with Christ Blessing the Children	Jan de Bray	1663	Frans Hals Museum	OS-I-36	71
	Portrait of a Two-Year Old Boy	Caesar van Everdingen	1664	Cannon Hall		72
	Portrait of a Girl as a Huntress	Caesar van Everdingen	1665	Royal Museum of Fine Arts Antwerp (KMSKA)	382	73
	Portrait of a Boy	Jan van Noordt	1665	Museum of Fine Arts of Lyon		74
	Twins	Johanna Vergouwen	1668	private collection		75
	Portrait of a boy as a hunter	Pieter Nason	1665	Villa Vauban		76
	Flower garland with portrait of William III of Orange, aged 10	Jan Davidsz. de Heem; Jan Vermeer van Utrecht	1666; 1659	Museum of Fine Arts of Lyon; Gallery Prince Willem V Department of Paintings of the Louvre	A 85	77
	Two Angels Bearing a Dead Infant up to Heaven – c. 1675	Nicolaes Maes	1675	private collection		78
	Group Portrait as Mirror of Virtue	Nicolaes Maes	1670s	private collection		79
	Allegorical Portrait of Anthony de Bordes and His Son Anthony	Adriaen Backer	1673	Amsterdam Museum	SB 6404	80
	Three Children in a Landscape – 1677	Nicolaes Maes	1677	Slot Zuylen	S 43	81
	Group portrait with allegorical overtones of the children of Diederic Pietersz van Leyden (van Leeuwen; 1628–82), burgomaster of Leiden, and Alida Paets (1625–73)	Daniel Mijtens the Younger	1679	Rijksmuseum	SK-A-4222	82
	George de Vicq as Ganymede – 1681 – Fogg Art Museum	Nicolaes Maes	1681	Fogg Museum	1993.25	83
	Deathbed portrait of a child, probably Catharina Margaretha van Valkenburg (1680–1682)	Jan Thopas	1682	Mauritshuis		84
	Cunera Oltshoorn	Adriaen van der Werff	1683	Museum Rotterdam		85
