= Portrait of Helena van der Schalcke =

Painting by Gerard ter Borch the Younger

Portrait of Helen van der Schalcke
- Portret van Helena van der Schalcke (Dutch)
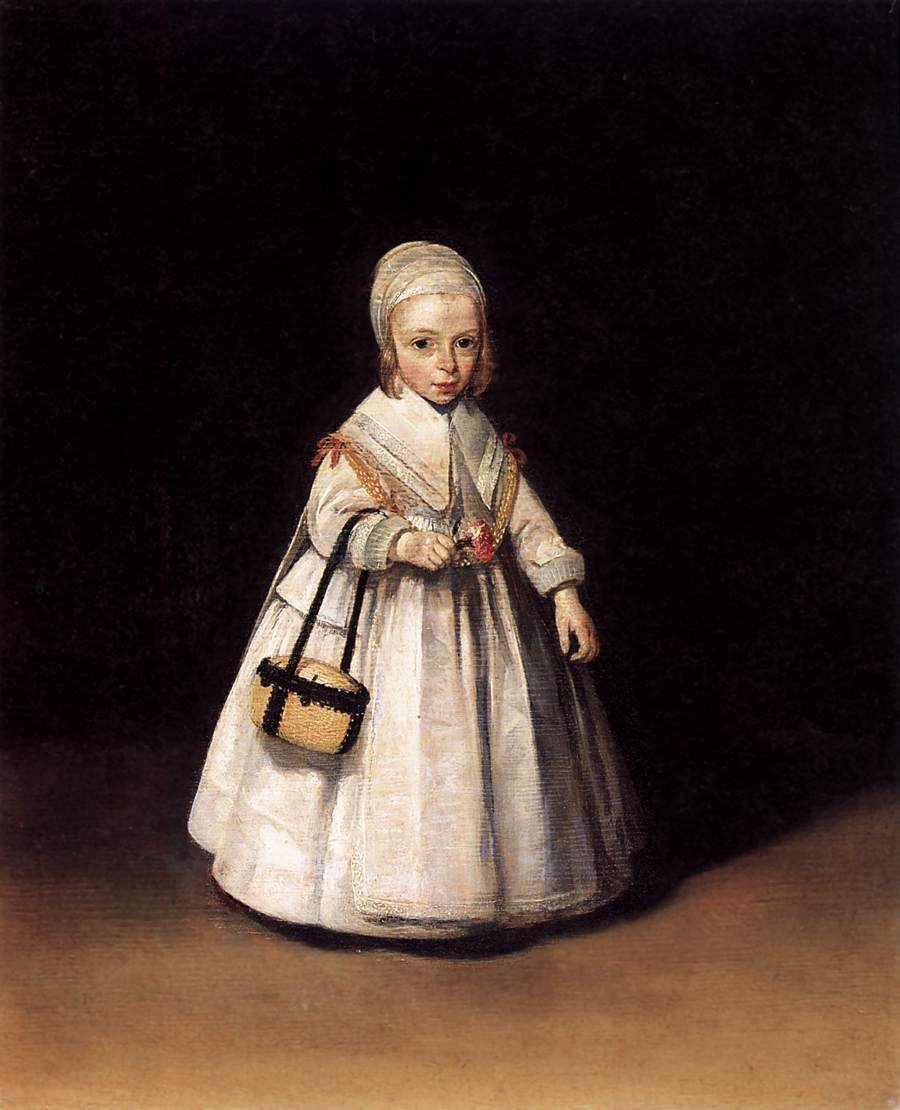
- Artist: Gerard ter Borch
- Year: c. 1648
- Medium: Oil on wood
- Dimensions: 35 cm × 28.5 cm (14 in × 11.2 in)
- Location: Rijksmuseum; Amsterdam

Portrait of Helen van der Schalcke or Helena van der Schalcke as a Child is an oil-on-panel painting by Dutch artist Gerard ter Borch, created c. 1648. The painting is held at the Rijksmuseum, in Amsterdam.

== Description and analysis ==
The painting depicts Helena van der Schalcke (1646–1671) at the age of two years. The girl is wearing a beautiful dress, decorated with lace and bows. She also wears a large gold necklace and chic clothes with a lady's wicker bag. She is depicted as a small adult.

Helena van der Schalcke was the daughter of the cloth merchant Gerard van der Schalcke and his wife Johanna Bardoel. They too were portrayed by Ter Borch. In the painting Helena has a red carnation in her hand. This flower is common in portraits of the time. A carnation is a symbol of the resurrection and of the hope of eternal life.

Helena wears a long, wide dress of white silk. Ter Borch paid a lot of attention to the reproduction of the fabric. He has enlivened the white with touches of paint from soft pink to blue-grey.

In the seventeenth century it was common for children to wear dresses at a young age, both girls and boys. The garments at the time were small copies of those for adult women. Yet there was a difference: long ribbons often hung on the back with which the child could be held, so-called leashes, which can also be seen on Helena's back.

The interior in which Helena is depicted is completely empty. Even the separation between the floor and the wall is blurred. Ter Borch often gives his portraits this empty, neutral background. In this way, nothing distracts the attention from the portrayed.

== See also ==
- Pride and Joy: Children's Portraits in the Netherlands, 1500–1700, exhibition in Haarlem and Antwerp, 2000-2001, cat. nr. 48
