= Jacob Rotius =

Dutch Golden Age painter

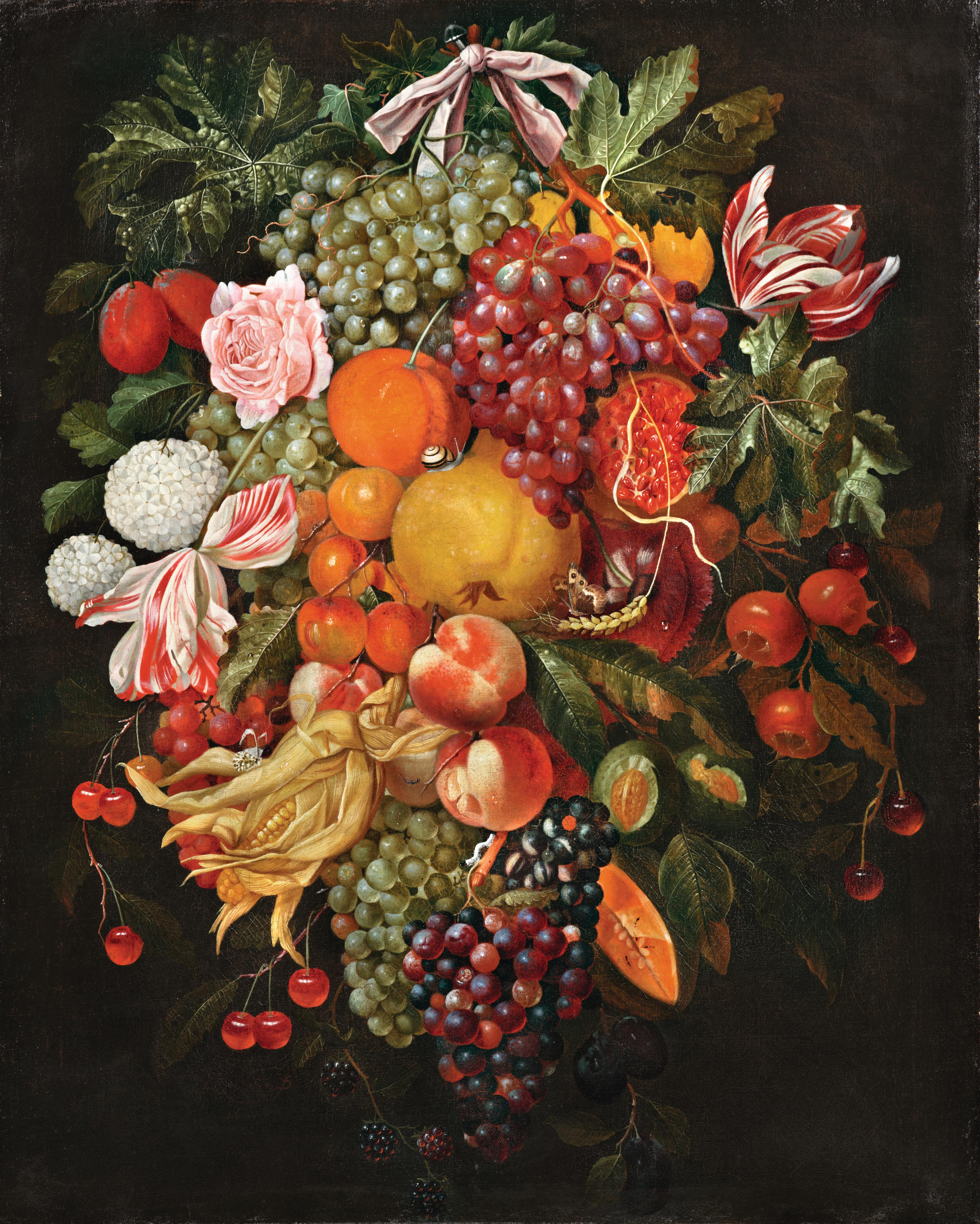
Jacob Rotius: Still life with fruits, 1680

Jacob Rotius (11 September 1644, Hoorn – 1681, Hoorn), was a Dutch Golden Age painter.

== Biography ==
According to Houbraken he was a pupil of Jan Davidsz de Heem, whose style he successfully copied. He earned a good living as a flower painter, but died relatively young due to his "melancholy attitude".

According to the RKD he was the son of Jan Albertsz Rotius, and specialized in flower and vegetable still life paintings.
