= Jan Albertsz Rotius =

Dutch painter

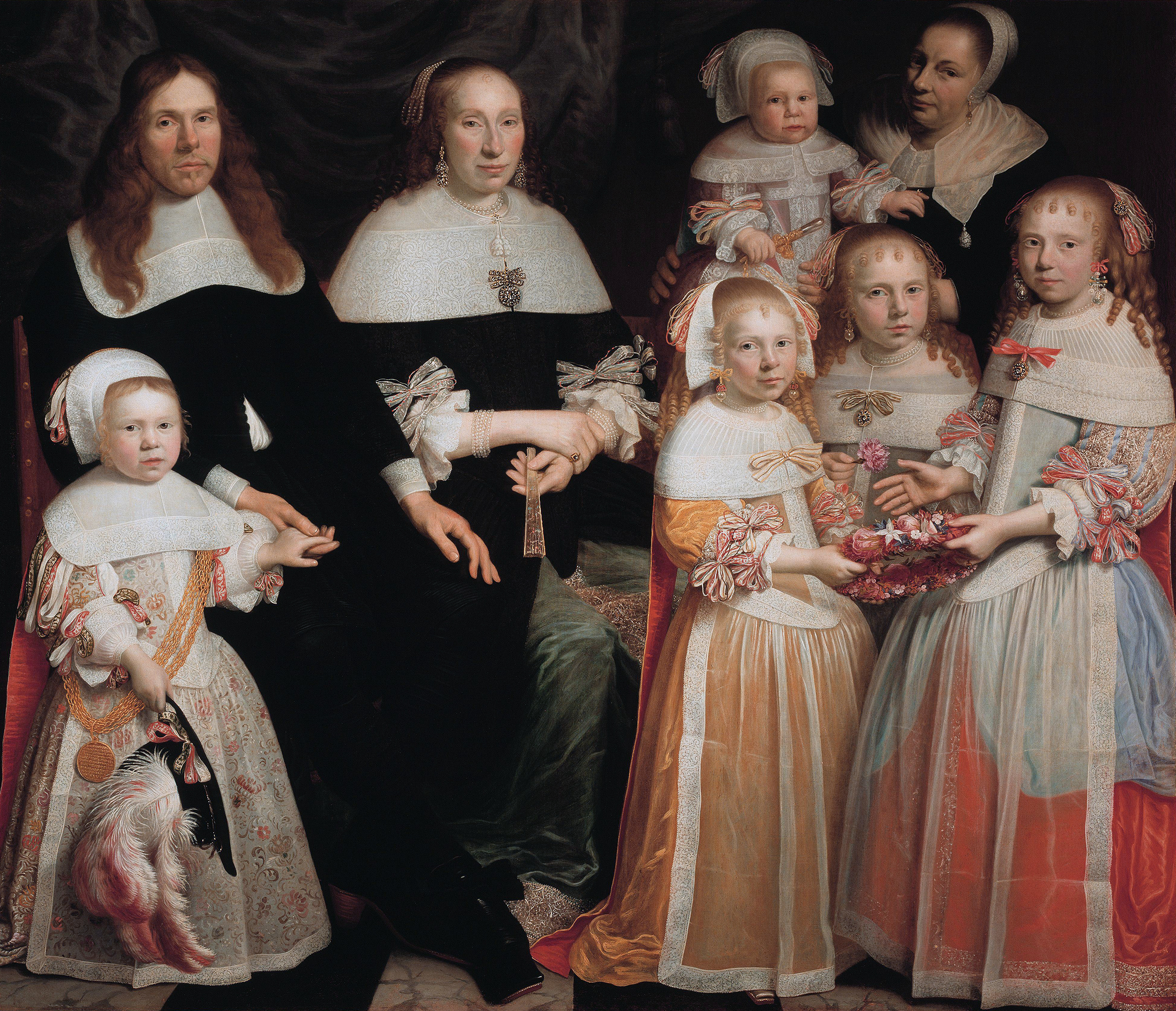
Portrait of the family Meyndert Sonck (1626-1675) and Agatha van Neck (1634-1707) and their children.

Jan Albertsz. Rotius (20 October 1624 – 1 November 1666 (buried)) was a Dutch painter known for his individual and group portraits, breakfast still lifes, kitchen still lifes and fruit still lifes. He was active in Hoorn and was the father of the flower painter Jacob Rotius.

== Life ==
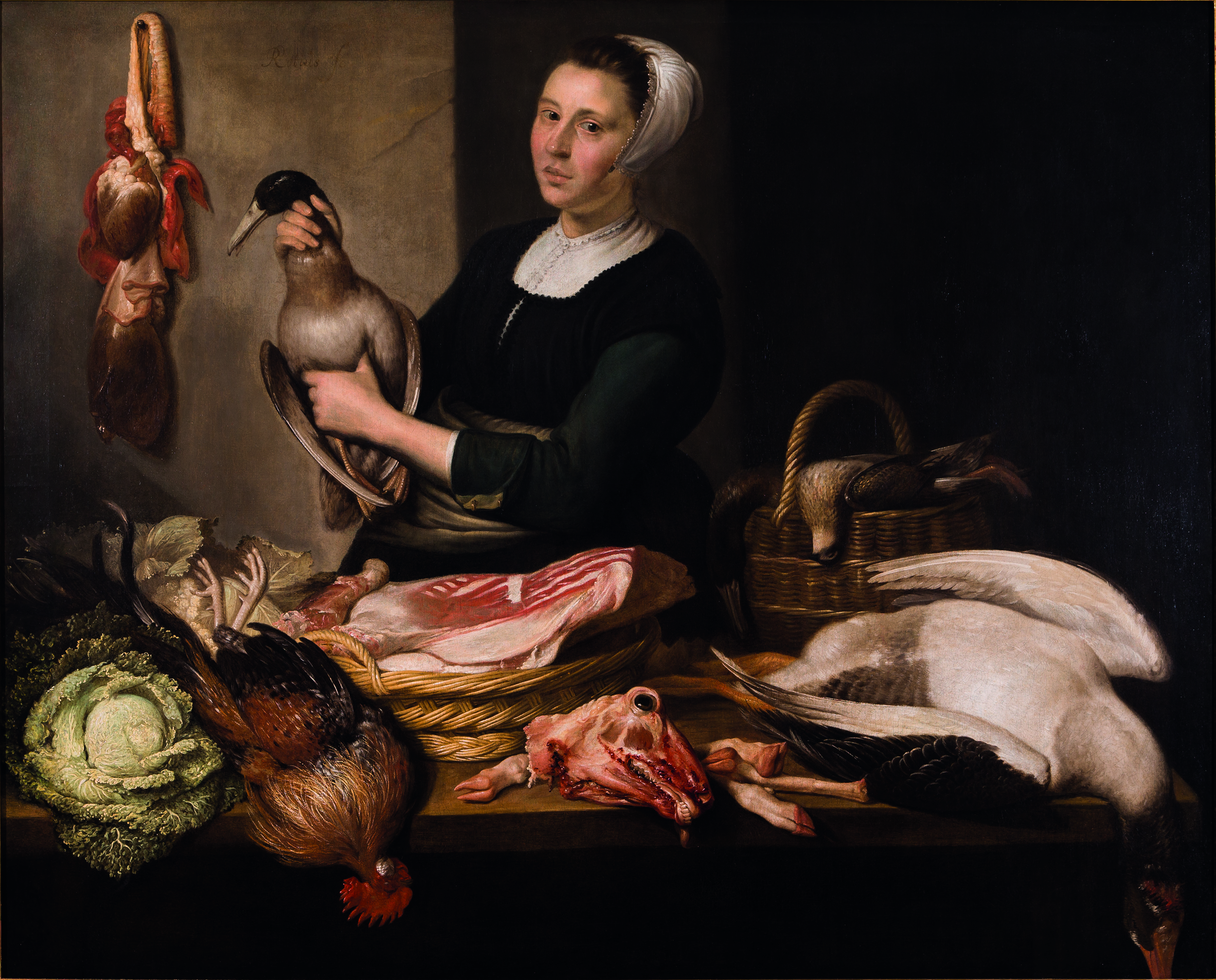
Kitchen piece

Rotius was born in Medemblik, North Holland where he was baptised on 20 October 1624. His baptismal name was 'Albert Jansz. Rootgies', but he later Latinized his name to Rotius, which was garbled by the early Dutch biographer Arnold Houbraken into Roodseus, possibly because in his marriage document he is listed as Rootseijus. Houbraken stated that Rotius was a pupil of Pieter Lastman, who died in 1633. If he was born in 1624, then he was only 9 years old when Lastman died. Such an apprenticeship therefore seems unlikely. In 1643 he became a member of the Alkmaar Guild of St. Luke, which may point to an initial training in that city.

He moved to Hoorn in where, according to the local archives, Rotius married Maartje Ambrosiusdr in 1643. Of their seven children only three would live to adulthood, including the still-life painter Jacob Rotius who was born in Hoorn in 1644. Houbraken claimed that Jacob was a pupil of Jan Davidsz. de Heem and was quite successful as a flower painter, but died of "melancholy" at the age of 50.

In his testament dated 16 October 1666, Rotius left all of his prints and drawings to his son Jacob Rotius or Rootius (1644–1682). He died in Hoorn a few days later, aged 42, and was buried in the Grote Kerk in Hoorn.

== Civic guard portraits ==
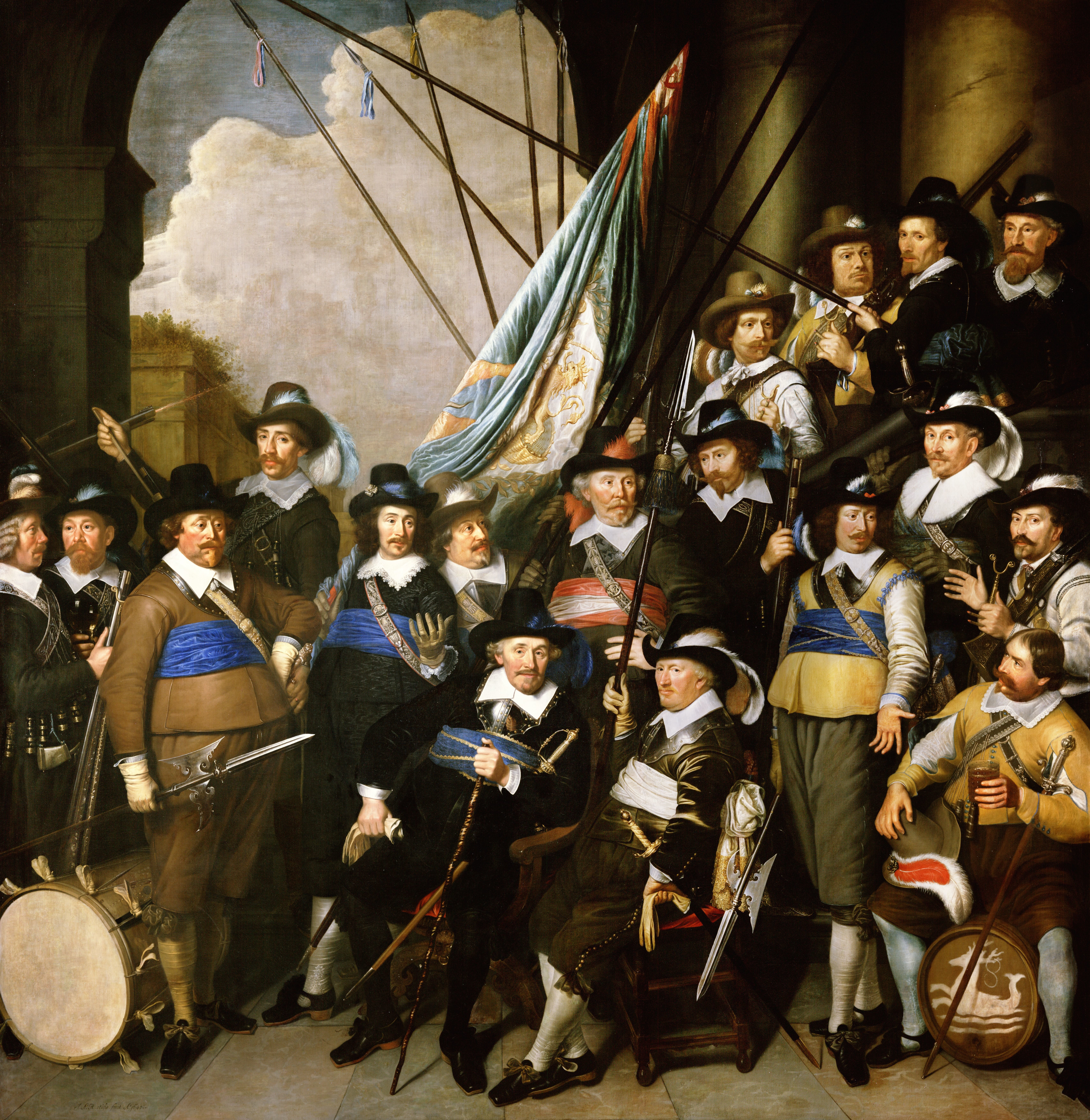
Hoorn schutterstuk, 1649

Rotius's schutterstukken were painted quite soon after similar paintings in Amsterdam were completed by Bartholomeus van der Helst and Govert Flink. Comparative study shows he was influenced by these paintings, and perhaps was encouraged to achieve similar effects by his patrons.
