= Johannes Cornelisz Verspronck =

Dutch painter

Johannes Verspronck
- Born: Johannes Cornelisz. Verspronck c. 1600–1603; Haarlem, Dutch Republic
- Died: June 1662 (aged 59–62); Haarlem, Dutch Republic
- Known for: Painting
- Movement: Baroque

Johannes Cornelisz Verspronck (between 1600 and 1603 – buried 30 June 1662) was a Dutch Golden Age portrait painter from Haarlem.

== Life ==
Johannes Cornelisz Verspronck was born between 1600 and 1603 in Haarlem as the son of the painter Cornelis Engelsz from Gouda, who taught him to paint. In 1632 he became a member of the Haarlem Guild of St. Luke and started a successful career as a portraitist of mostly Catholic sitters in Haarlem. He may have been a Frans Hals pupil, and was strongly influenced by him, especially in his natural expressions and relaxed poses. He is best known for his exactness in painting details such as jewelry and lace, which made him quite popular with female sitters. Most notably, he won a lucrative commission in 1642 for a group portrait of the regentesses of the Heilige Geesthuis, at the time one of the wealthiest charity institutions in Haarlem, situated on the Krocht. This was won at the expense of Frans Hals himself, who had painted the regents of the St. Elisabeth Gasthuis in 1641 and fully expected to win the commission for the women. Twenty years later Verspronck even painted the regentesses of the St. Elisabeth Gasthuis.

According to Houbraken, he was called "Gerard Sprong", and was the son of the painter Cornelis Engelsz who made many schuttersstukken that could be seen in the Doelen (he meant the buildings in Haarlem that were used for target practise, and where today the central library and proveniershuis are located.

Verspronck died in 1662 in Haarlem. He was buried on 30 June 1662.

== Works ==
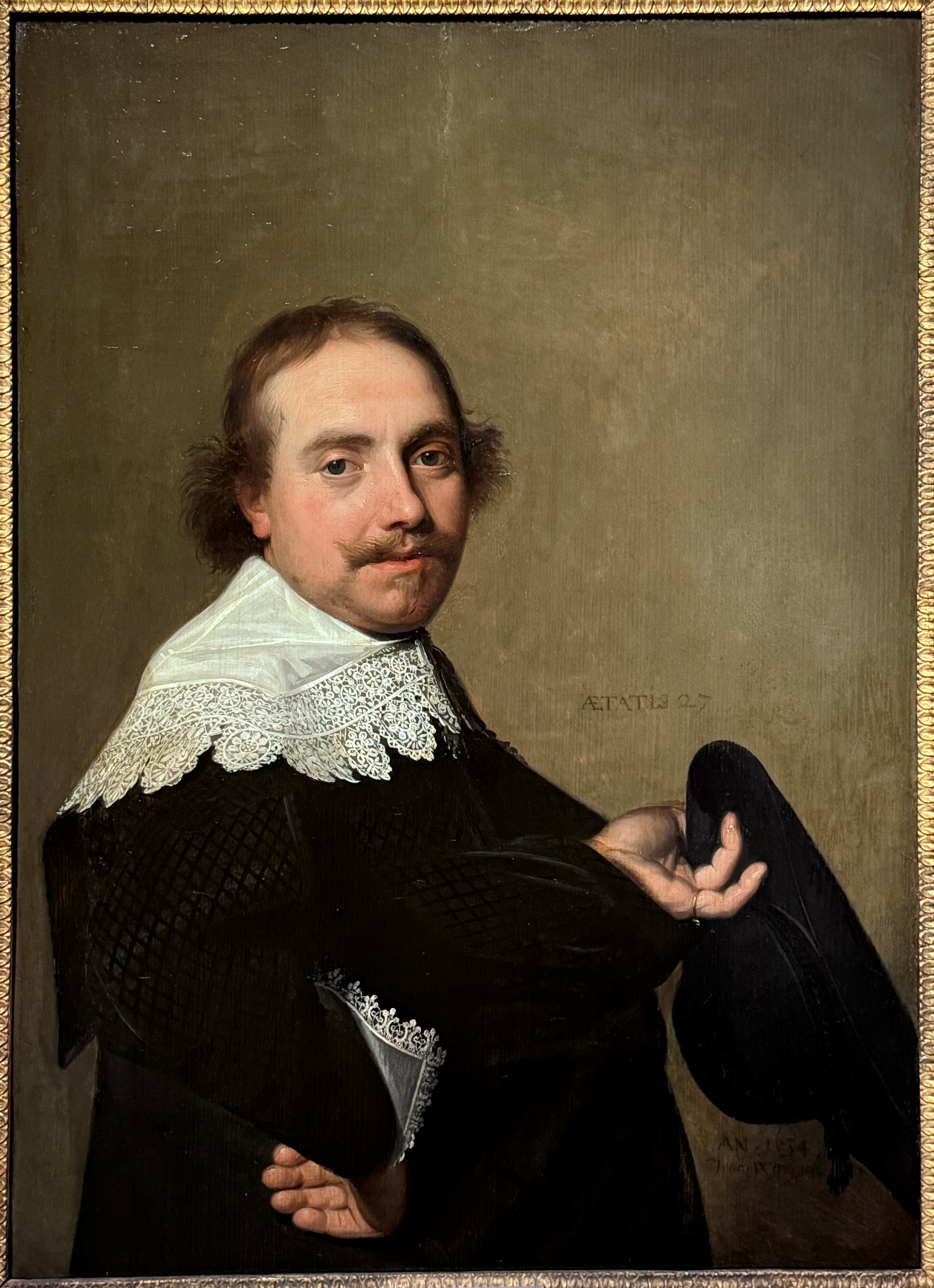
Portrait of a 27-year-old man, Anhaltische Gemäldegalerie Dessau, 1634, signed

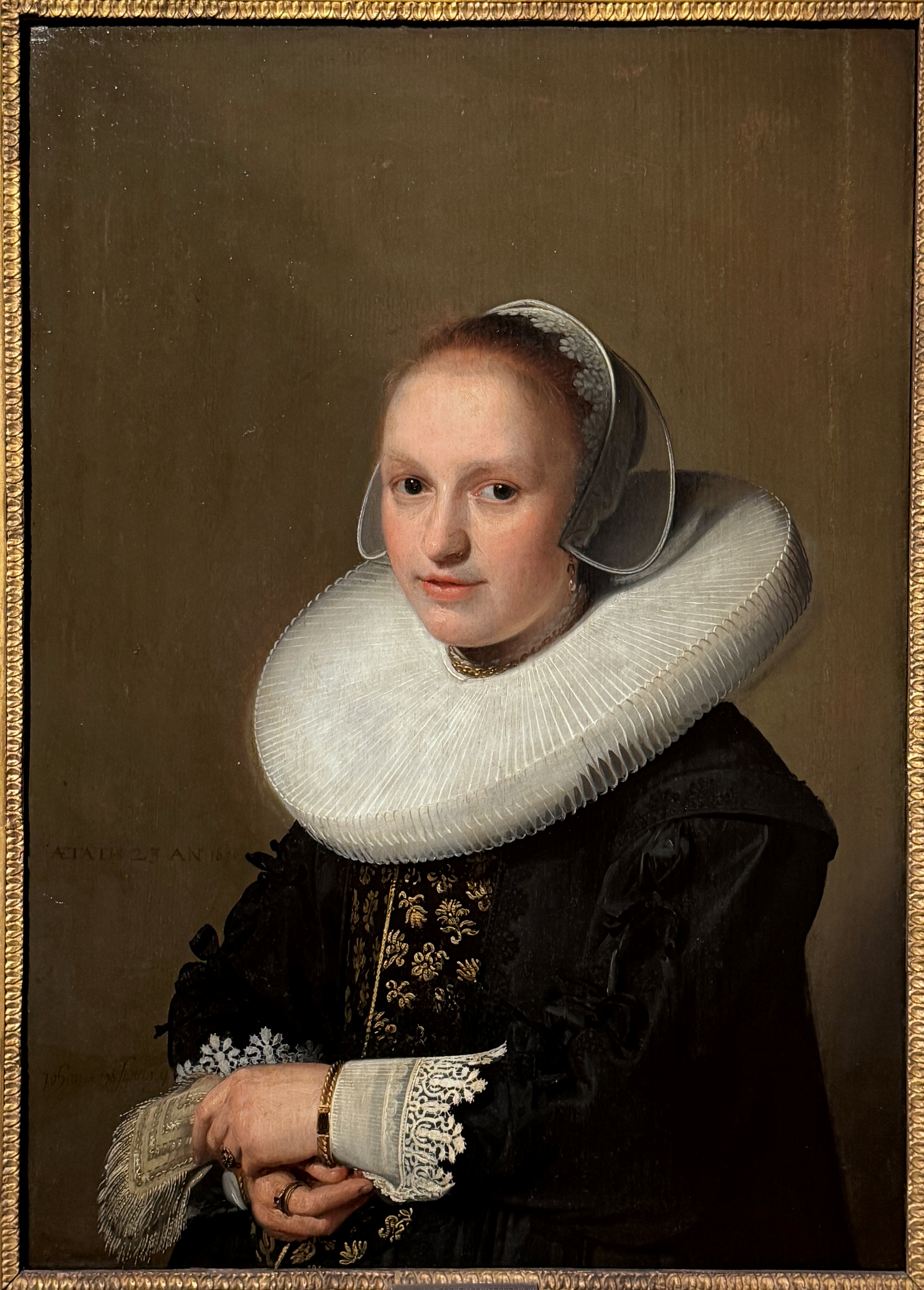
Portrait of a 23-year-old woman, Anhaltische Gemäldegalerie Dessau, 1636, signed

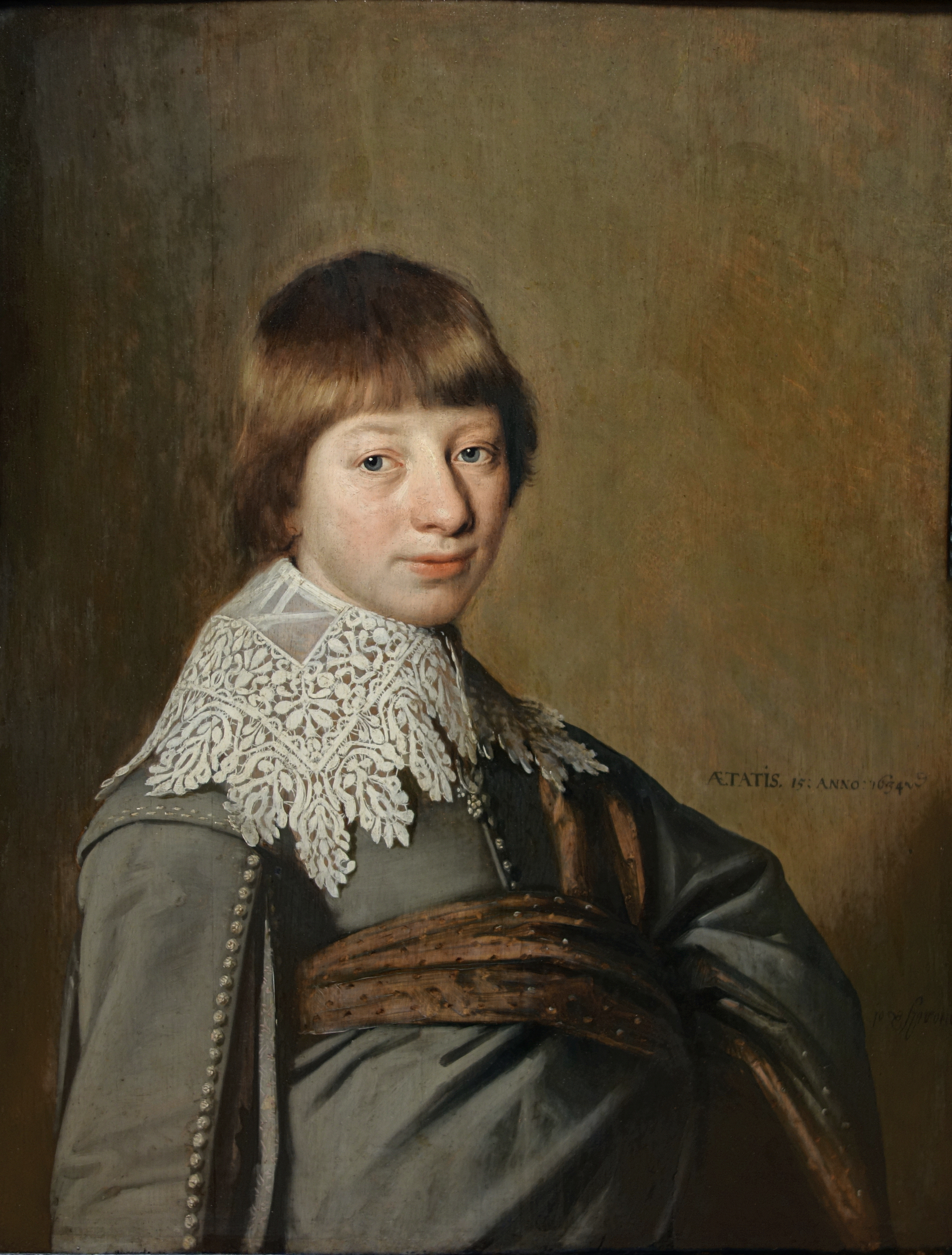
Portrait of a Young Man, Palais des Beaux-Arts de Lille, 1634

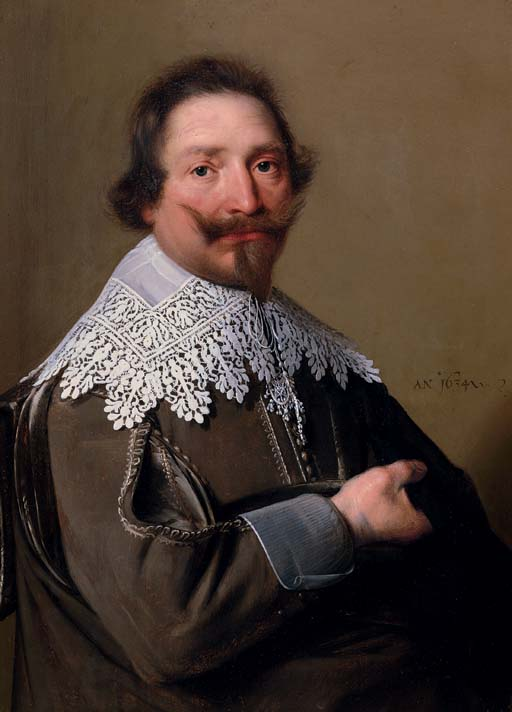
Jean le Gouche, 1634

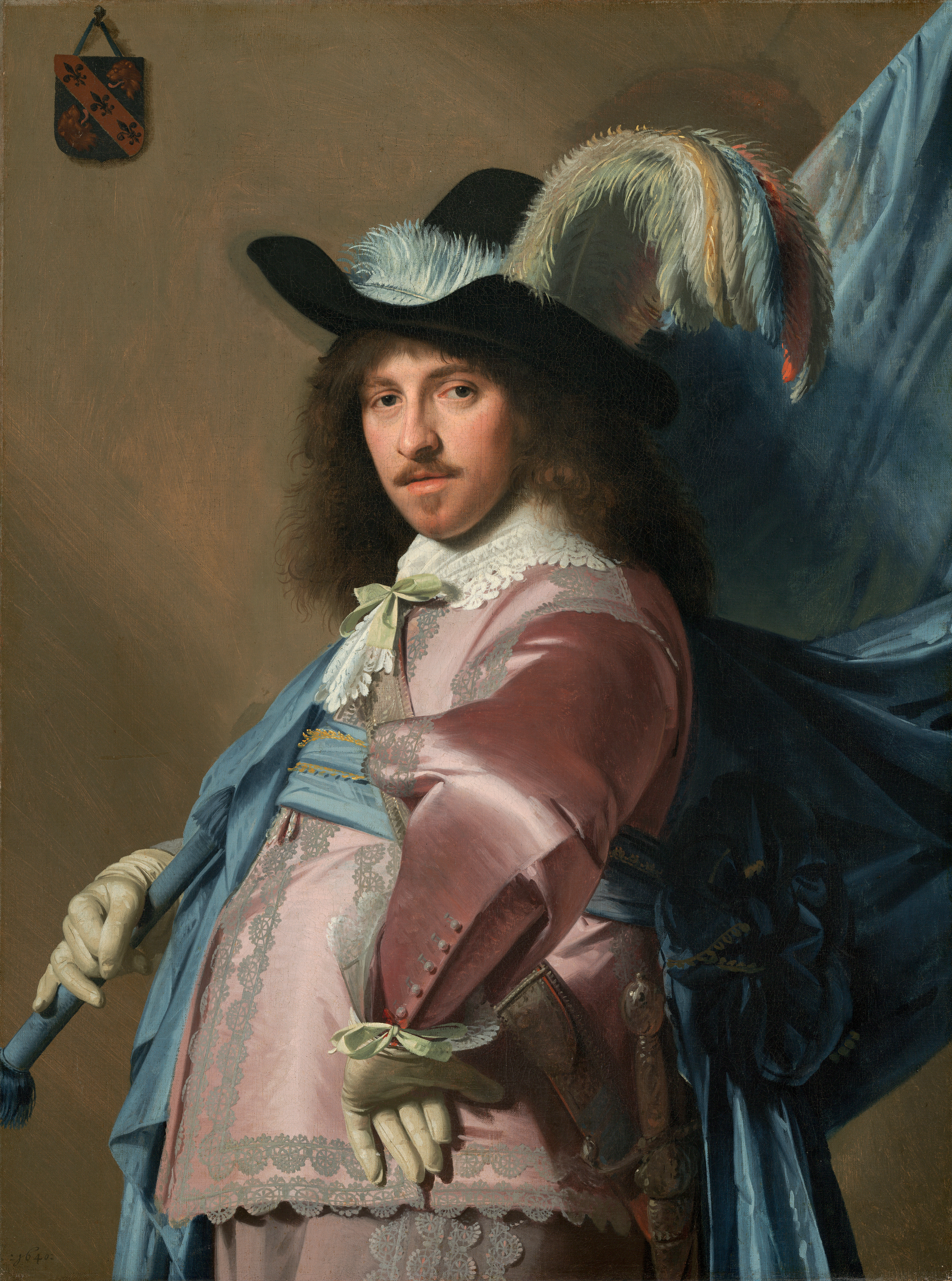
Andries Stilte as a Standard Bearer (1640)

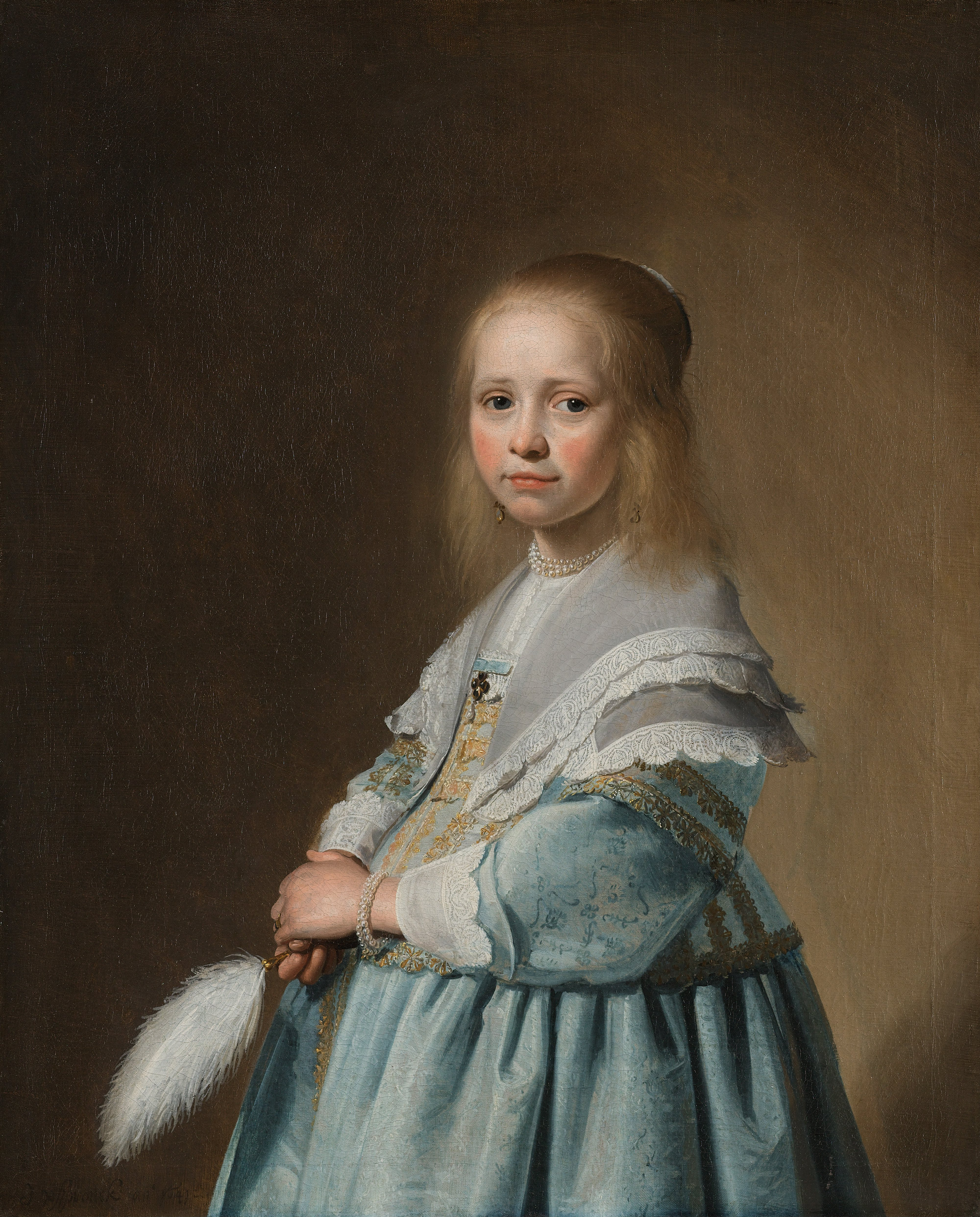
Girl in a Blue Dress (1641)

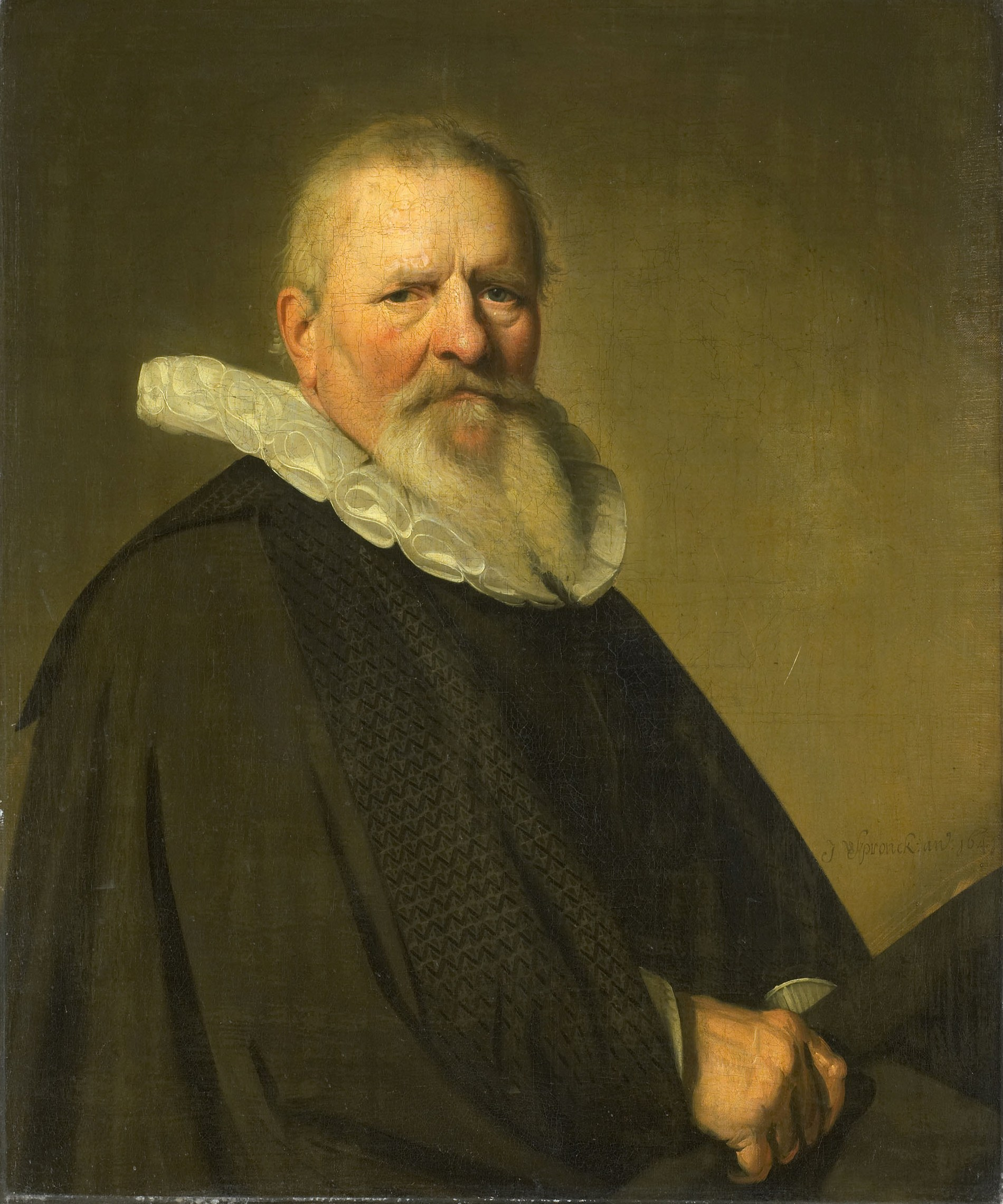
Portrait of Pieter Jacobsz. Schout (1641)

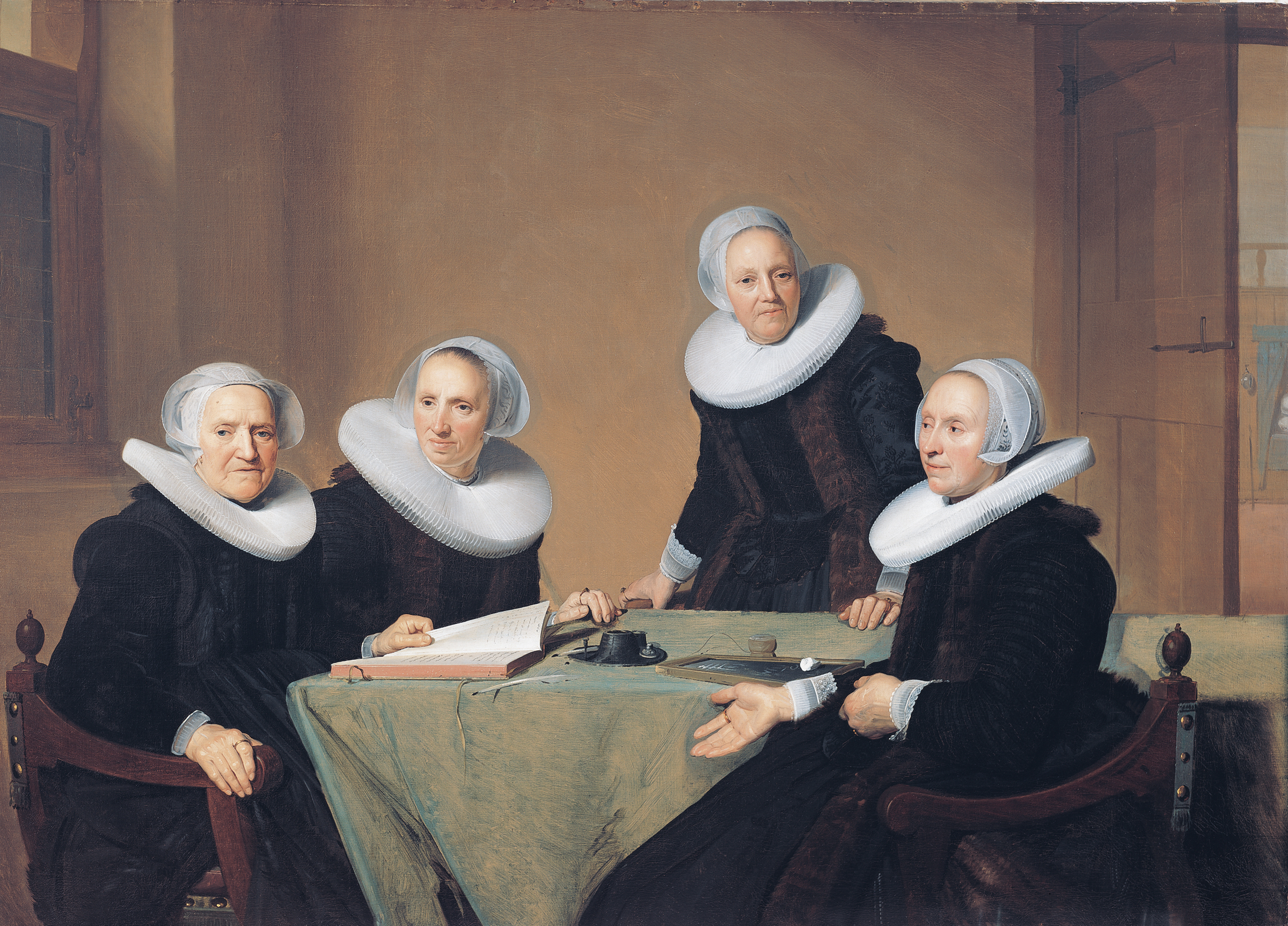
Portrait of the Regentesses of the St Elisabeth Gasthuis, Frans Hals Museum, 1662

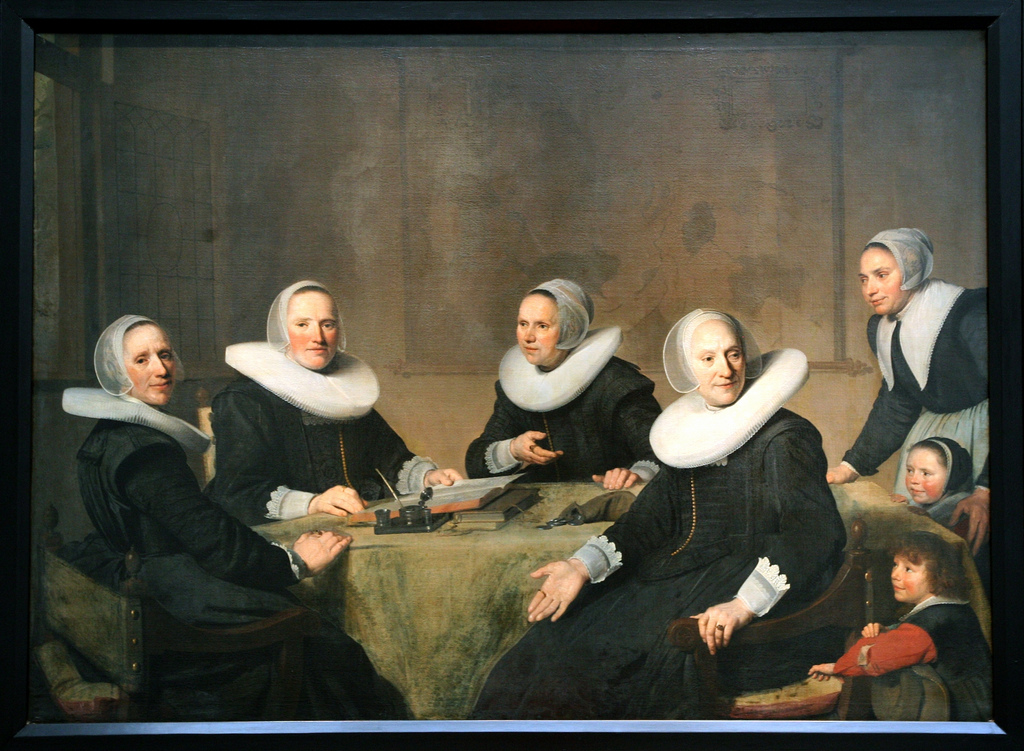
Portrait of the Regentesses of the Heilige Geesthuis, Frans Hals Museum, 1642

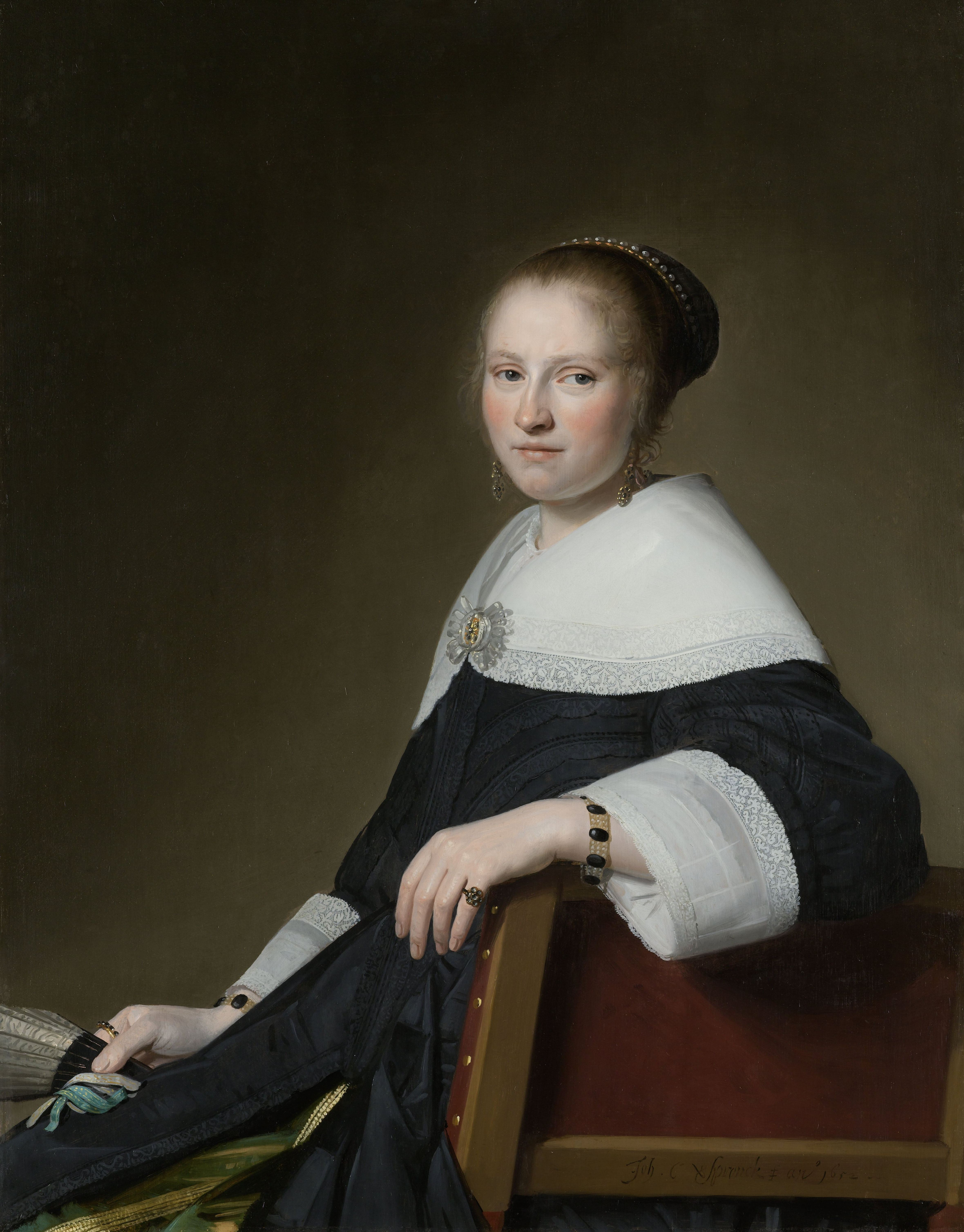
Portrait of Maria Strijp, Rijksmuseum Amsterdam, 1652

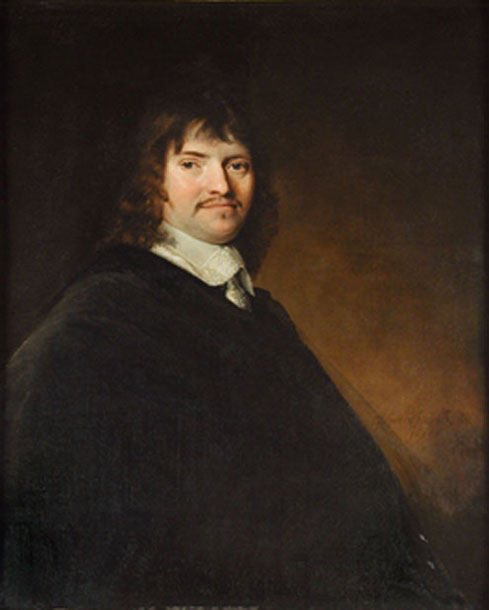
Portrait of gentleman, National Museum of Decorative Arts, Buenos Aires, 1651

== Legacy ==
Verspronck produced about 100 known paintings.

His Girl in a Blue Dress appeared on 15 September 1945, on the bank note for 25 Dutch guilders. The bank note had a circulation of approximately 39 million, and was removed from circulation on 1 February 1953.

His portrait of the Amsterdam merchant Jean le Gouche (1634) was in the collection of Hermann Göring. The portrait was auctioned in 2007, and came from the collection of Jacques Goudstikker; its current whereabouts is unknown.

Verspronck is remembered in the name of a thoroughfare (the Verspronckweg) in Haarlem.
