= Jan Claesz =

Dutch painter

Jan Claesz.
- Born: 1570s Enkhuizen
- Died: 1618

Jan Claesz. (c. 1570 – 1618) was a painter from the Dutch Republic.

Claesz was probably born in Enkhuizen, where he was active during the years 1594–1618.

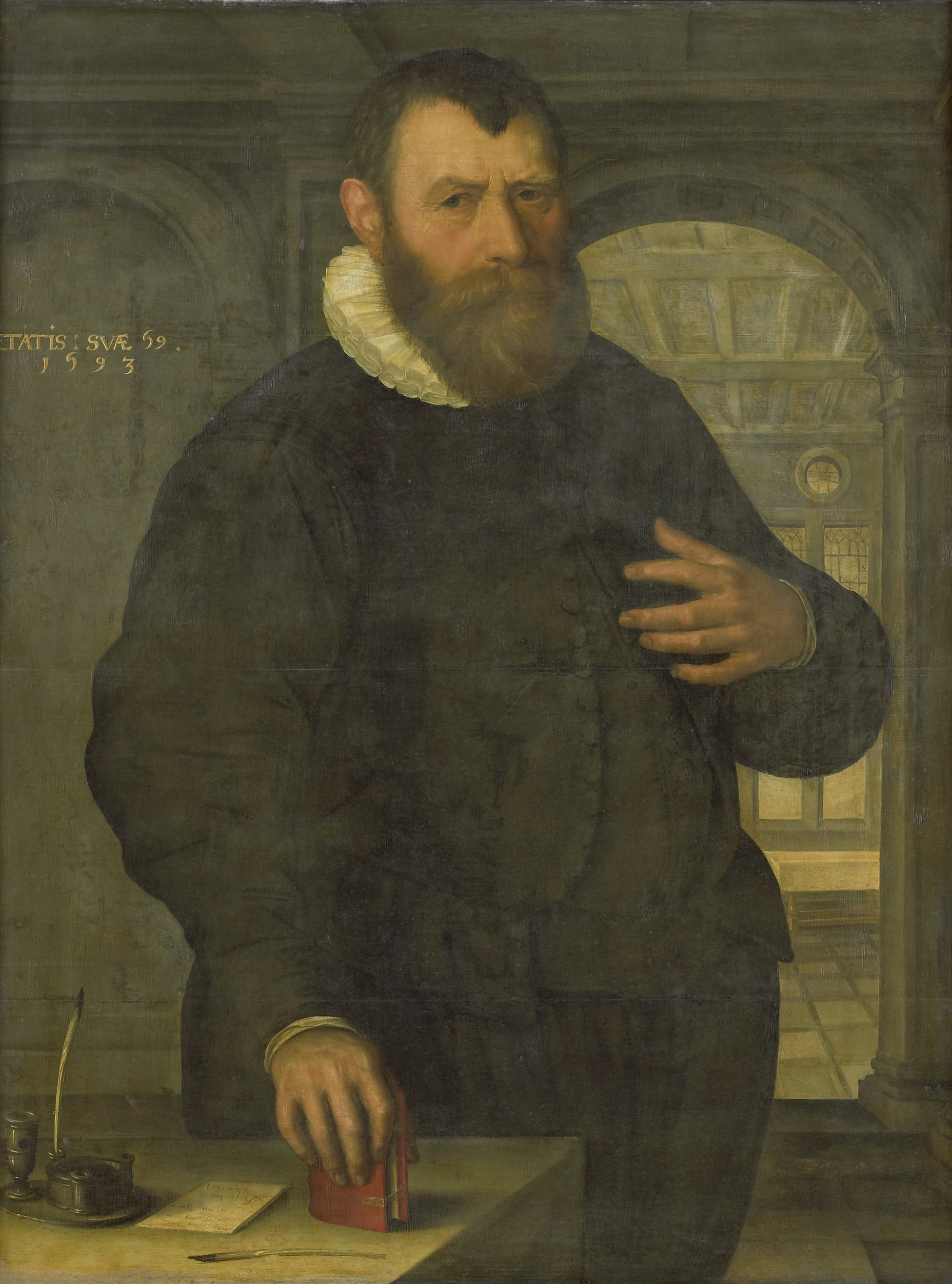
Portrait of Bartholomeus van der Wiere (1534-1603) in 1578, Financial administrator of Amsterdam

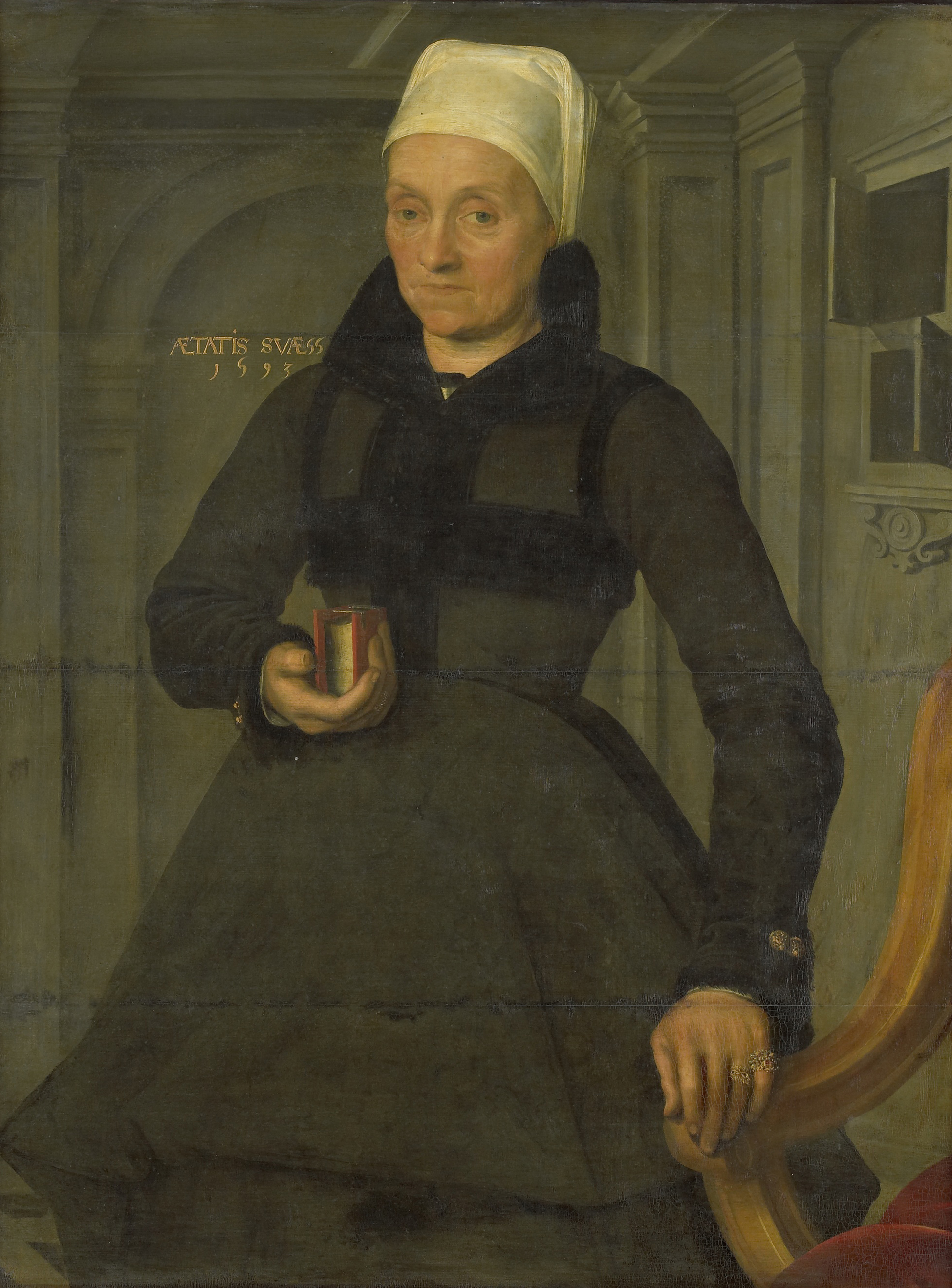
Pendant portrait of his wife Lysbeth Hendriksdr (1536-na 1603)
