= Girl in a Blue Dress =

1641 painting by Johannes Cornelisz Verspronck

- Portret van een meisje in het blauw (Dutch)
- Artist: Johannes Cornelisz Verspronck
- Year: 1641
- Catalogue: SK-A-3064
- Medium: Oil on canvas
- Movement: Dutch Golden Age
- Dimensions: 82 cm × 66.7 cm (32 in × 26.3 in)
- Location: Rijksmuseum; Amsterdam

Girl in a Blue Dress, also called Portrait of a Girl Dressed in Blue (Dutch: Portret van een meisje in het blauw) or simply Portrait of a Girl (Dutch: Portret van een meisje), is an oil painting by Johannes Cornelisz Verspronck from 1641. It is in the collection of the Rijksmuseum, after it was acquired in 1928 as a gift from the Vereniging Rembrandt. The identity of the girl and her family are unknown.

== Provenance ==
In 1912 the wealthy merchant and art collector Mari Paul Voûte (1856–1928) became chairman of the Vereniging Rembrandt. At the end of World War I, when Frederick Augustus II, Grand Duke of Oldenburg was forced to abdicate and needed to downsize, his art collection came on the market and in 1923 the Vereniging Rembrandt formed a consortium with senior members to purchase artworks from this collection at their own risk in order to give them to the Amsterdam museum. The Girl in Blue was one of these artworks purchased by Voûte. Rather than giving it directly to the museum, however, he kept it until he died, whereupon he bequeathed it to the Vereniging Rembrandt for them to make over to the Rijksmuseum, which they did.

The painting is very similar in composition to a pendant marriage portrait painted by Verspronck the year before, today in the collection of the Rijksmuseum Twenthe:

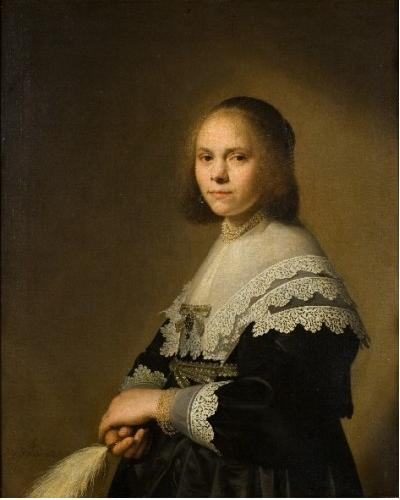
Portrait of a Woman with an ostrich feather fan (1640)
