= Frans Hals =

Painter from the Northern Netherlands (c. 1582–1666)

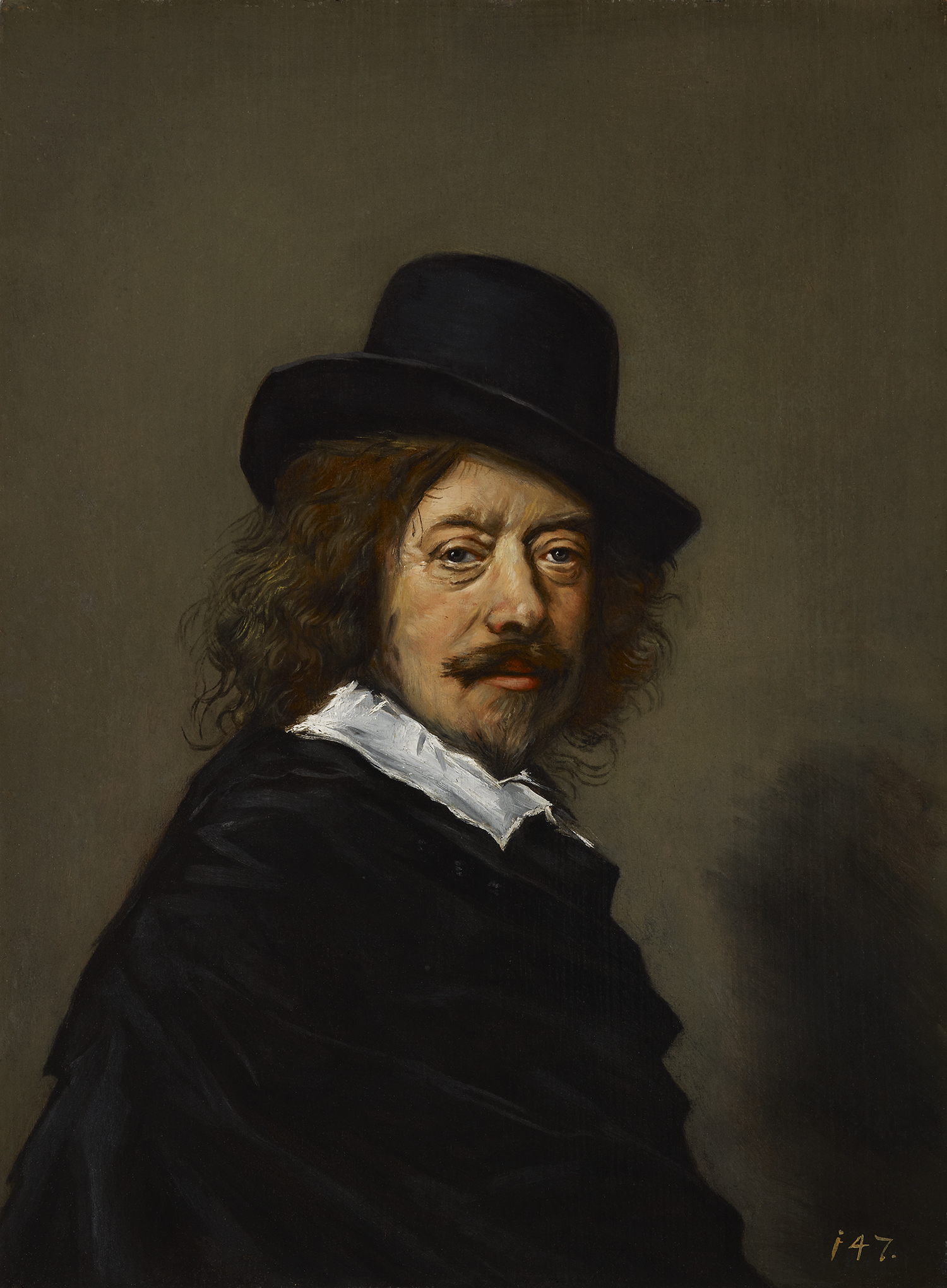
- Copy of a Self-portrait by Hals
- Born: c. 1582; Antwerp, Brabant, Spanish Netherlands
- Died: 26 August 1666 (aged 83–84); Haarlem, Dutch Republic
- Notable work: The Gypsy Girl (1628); Laughing Cavalier (1624); Laughing Boy (c. 1625)
- Movement: Dutch Golden Age

Frans Hals the Elder (UK: /hæls/, US: /hɑːls, hælz, hɑːlz/; Dutch: [frɑns ˈɦɑls]; c. 1582 – 26 August 1666) was a Dutch Golden Age painter. He lived and worked in Haarlem, a city in which the local authority of the day frowned on religious painting in places of worship but citizens liked to decorate their homes with works of art. Hals was highly sought after by wealthy burgher commissioners of individual, married-couple, family, and institutional-group portraits. He also painted tronies for the general market.

There were two quite distinct schools of portraiture in 17th-century Haarlem: the neat (represented, for example, by Verspronck); and a looser, more painterly style at which Frans Hals excelled. Some of Hals's portrait work is characterised by a subdued palette, reflecting the politely serious tones of his fashionable clients' wardrobe. In contrast, the personalities he paints are full of life, typically with a friendly glint in the eye or the glimmer of a smile on the lips.

Hals was born at Antwerp in the southern Spanish Netherlands, but because of the chaos wrought there by the Spanish at that time, his family moved to Haarlem when he was little. Many of his Haarlem clients were also émigrés from the South.

== Biography ==
Hals was born in 1582 or 1583 in Antwerp, then in the Spanish Netherlands, as the son of cloth merchant Franchois Fransz Hals van Mechelen (c. 1542–1610) and his second wife Adriaentje van Geertenryck. Like many, Hals's parents fled during the Fall of Antwerp (1584–1585) from the south to Haarlem in the new Dutch Republic in the north, where he lived for the remainder of his life. Hals studied under Flemish émigré Karel van Mander, whose Mannerist influence, however, is barely noticeable in Hals's work.

In 1610, Hals became a member of the Haarlem Guild of Saint Luke, and he started to earn money as an art restorer for the town council. He worked on their large art collection, which Karel van Mander had described in his Schilderboeck ("Painter's Book") published in Haarlem in 1604. The most notable works were those of Geertgen tot Sint Jans, Jan van Scorel, and Jan Mostaert that hung in the St John's Church in Haarlem. The restoration work was paid for by the council. The council had confiscated all Catholic religious art in the Haarlemse Noon, although it did not formally possess the entire collection until 1625, when the city fathers had decided which were suitable for the town hall. The remaining art, which was considered too Roman Catholic, was sold to Cornelis Claesz van Wieringen, a fellow guild member, on condition that he remove it from Haarlem. It was in this cultural context that Hals began his career in portraiture, since the market had disappeared for religious themes.

The earliest known example of Hals's art is the portrait of Jacobus Zaffius (1611). His 'breakthrough' came with the life-sized group portrait The Banquet of the Officers of the St George Militia Company in 1616. His most famous sitter was René Descartes, whom he painted in 1649.

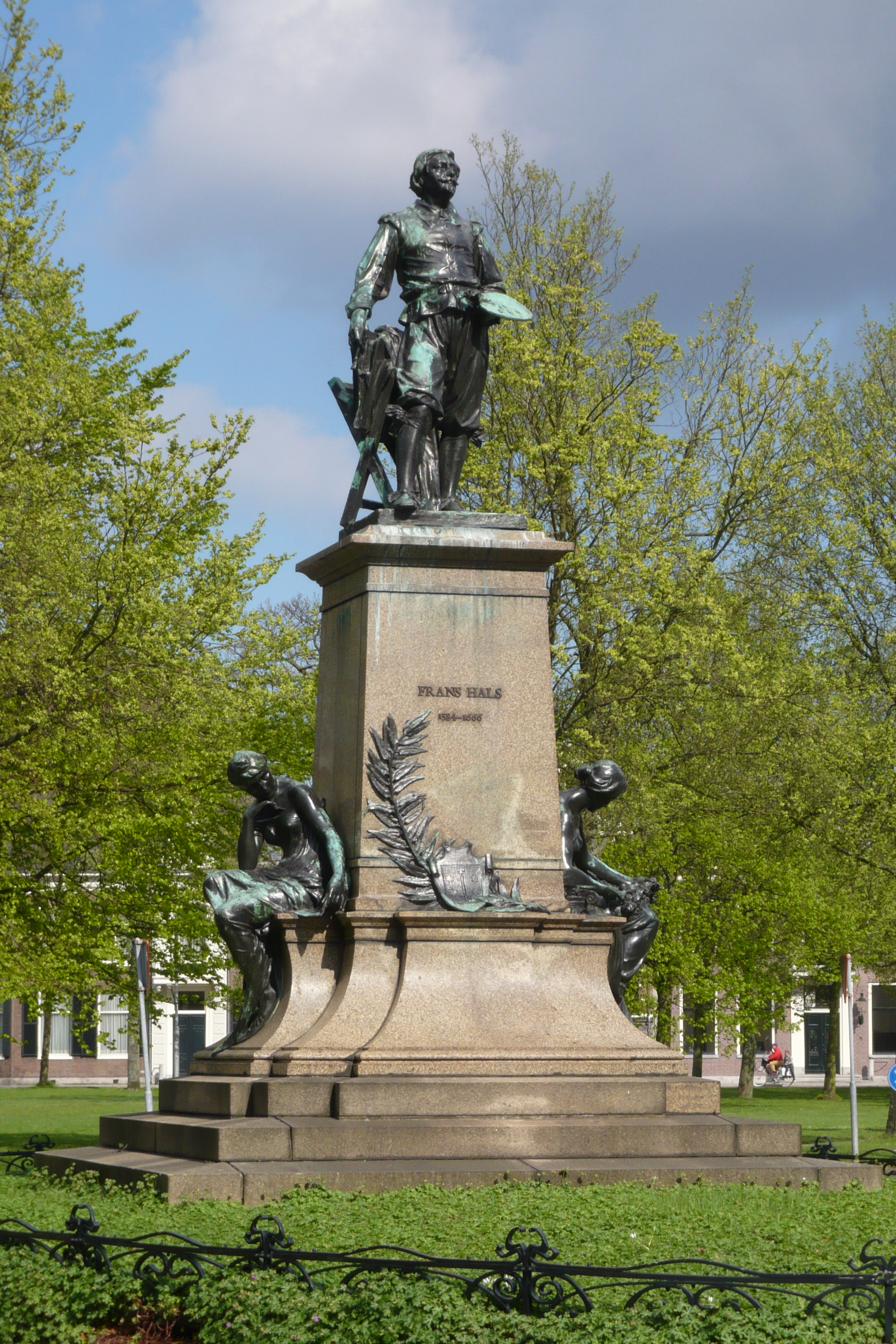
Statue of Frans Hals in Florapark, Haarlem

Frans Hals married his first wife Anneke Harmensdochter around 1610. Frans was of Catholic birth, however, so their marriage was recorded in the city hall and not in church. Unfortunately, the exact date is unknown because the older marriage records of the Haarlem city hall before 1688 have not been preserved. Anneke was born 2 January 1590 as the daughter of bleacher Harmen Dircksz and Pietertje Claesdr Ghijblant, and her maternal grandfather, linen producer Claes Ghijblant of Spaarne 42, bequeathed the couple the grave in the Grote Kerk church where both are buried, though Frans took over 40 years to join his first wife there. Anneke died in 1615, shortly after the birth of their third child and, of the three, Harmen survived infancy and one had died before Hals's second marriage.

As biographer Seymour Slive has pointed out, older stories of Hals abusing his first wife were confused with another Haarlem resident of the same name. Indeed, at the time of these charges, the artist had no wife to mistreat, as Anneke had died in May 1615. Similarly, historical accounts of Hals's propensity for drink were largely based on embellished anecdotes of his early biographers like Arnold Houbraken; there is no direct evidence that Hals did drink heavily. After his first wife died, Hals took on the young daughter of a fishmonger to look after his children and, in 1617, he married Lysbeth Reyniers. They married in Spaarndam, a small village outside the banns of Haarlem, because she was already eight months pregnant. Hals was a devoted father, and they went on to have eight children.

Contemporaries such as Rembrandt moved their households according to the caprices of their patrons, but Hals remained in Haarlem and insisted that his customers come to him. According to the Haarlem archives, a schutterstuk that Hals started in Amsterdam was finished by Pieter Codde because Hals refused to paint in Amsterdam, insisting that the militiamen come to Haarlem to sit for their portraits. For this reason, we can be sure that all sitters were either from Haarlem or were visiting Haarlem when they had their portraits made.

Hals's work was in demand through much of his life, but he lived so long that he eventually went out of style as a painter and experienced financial difficulties. In addition to his painting, he worked as a restorer, art dealer, and art tax expert for the city councilors. His creditors took him to court several times, and he sold his belongings to settle his debt with a baker in 1652. The inventory of the property seized mentions only three mattresses and bolsters, an armoire, a table, and five pictures (these were by himself, his sons, van Mander, and Maarten van Heemskerck). Left destitute, he was given an annuity of 200 florins in 1664 by the municipality.

The Dutch nation fought for independence during the Eighty Years' War, and Hals was a member of the local schutterij, a military guild. He included a self-portrait in his 1639 painting of the St Joris company, according to its 19th-century painting frame. (It has not been possible to confirm this.) It was not common for ordinary members to be painted, as that privilege was reserved for the officers. Hals painted the company three times. He was also a member of a local chamber of rhetoric, and in 1644 he became chairman of the Guild of St Luke.

Frans Hals died in Haarlem in 1666 and was buried in the Grote Kerk church. He had been receiving a city pension, which was highly unusual and a sign of the esteem with which he was regarded. After his death, his widow applied for aid and was admitted to the local almshouse, where she later died.

== Artistic career ==
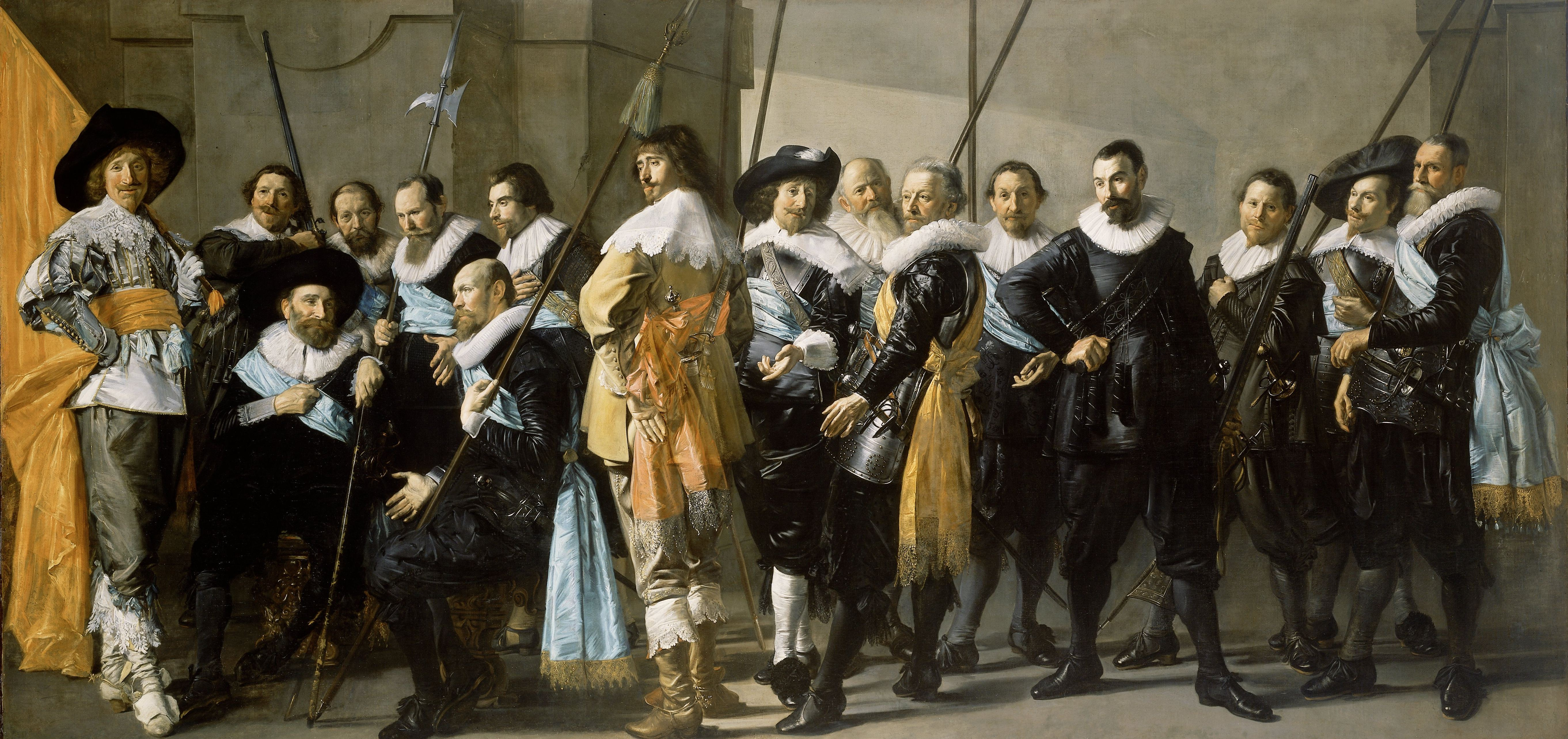
Frans Hals, later finished by Pieter Codde. De Magere Compagnie. 1637. Oil on canvas, 209 x 429 cm, Rijksmuseum Amsterdam

Hals is best known for his portraits, mainly of wealthy citizens such as Pieter van den Broecke and Isaac Massa, whom he painted three times. He also painted large group portraits for local civic guards and for the regents of local hospitals. He was a Dutch Golden Age painter who practiced an intimate realism with a radically free approach. His pictures illustrate the various strata of society: banquets or meetings of officers, guildsmen, local councilmen from mayors to clerks, itinerant players and singers, gentlemen, fishwives, and tavern heroes. In his group portraits, such as The Banquet of the Officers of the St Adrian Militia Company in 1627, Hals captures each character in a different manner. The faces are not idealized and are clearly distinguishable, with their personalities revealed in a variety of poses and facial expressions.

Hals was fond of daylight and silvery sheen, while Rembrandt used golden glow effects based upon artificial contrasts of low light in immeasurable gloom. Hals seized a moment in the life of his subjects with rare intuition. What nature displayed in that moment he reproduced thoroughly in a delicate scale of color and with mastery over every form of expression. He became so clever that exact tone, light and shade, and modeling were obtained with a few marked and fluid strokes of the brush. He became a popular portrait painter and painted the wealthy of Haarlem on special occasions. He won many commissions for wedding portraits (the husband is traditionally situated on the left, and the wife situated on the right). His double portrait of the newly married Olycans hang side by side in the Mauritshuis, but many of his wedding portrait pairs have since been split up and are rarely seen together.

== Wedding portraits ==
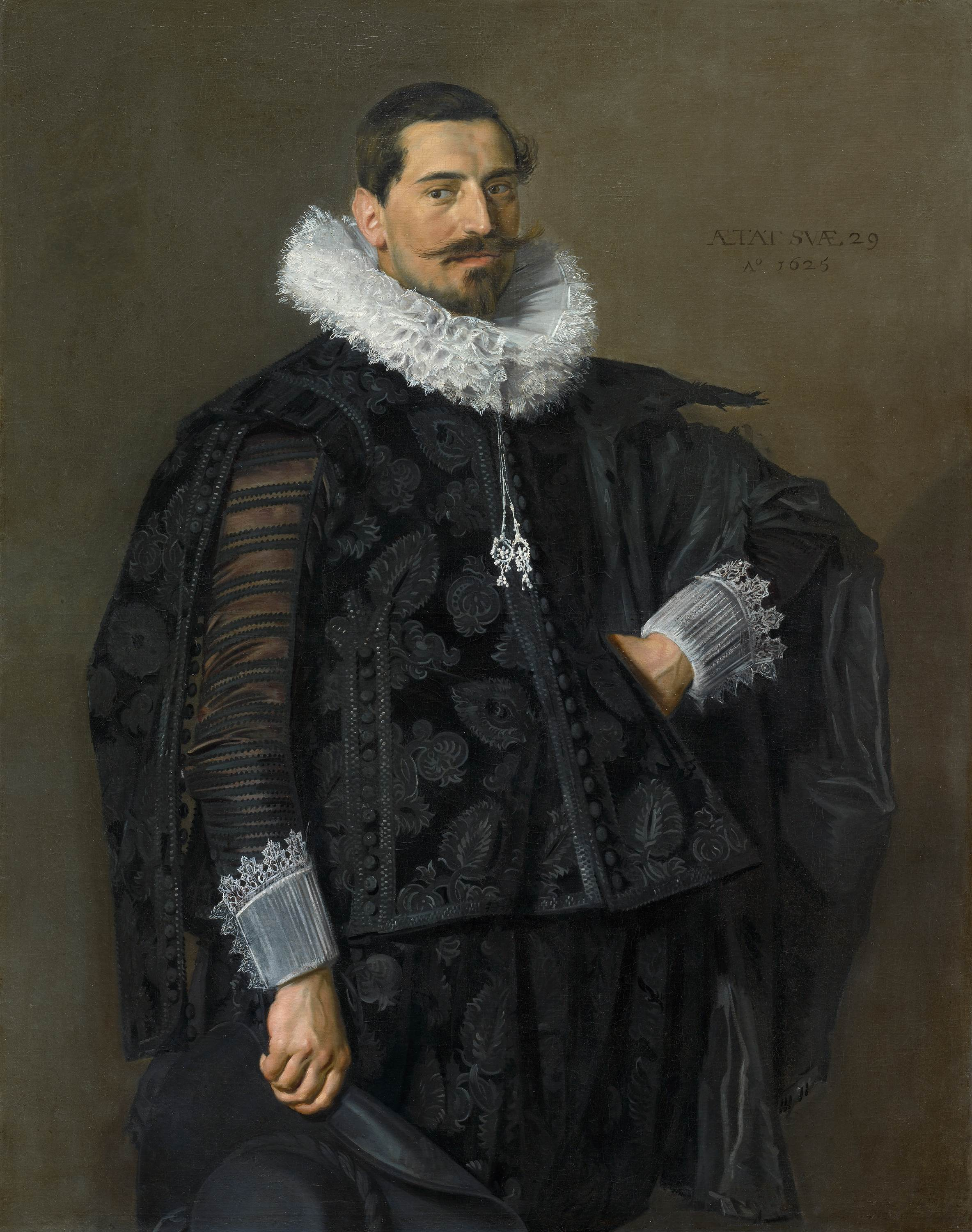
Portrait of Jacob Pietersz Olycan (1596–1638), 1625, Mauritshuis.

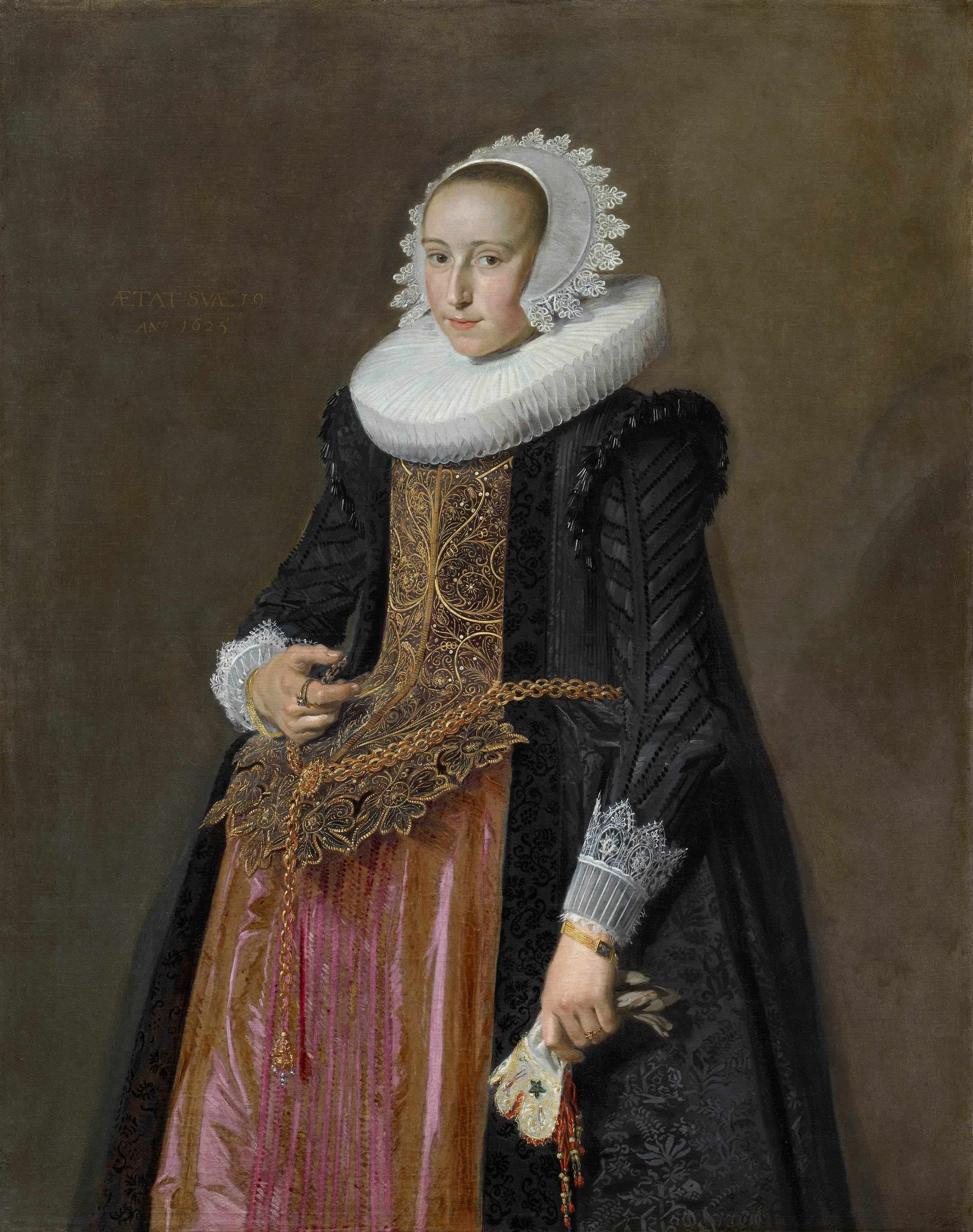
Portrait of Aletta Hanemans (1606–1653), bride of Jacob Olycan, 1625, Mauritshuis.

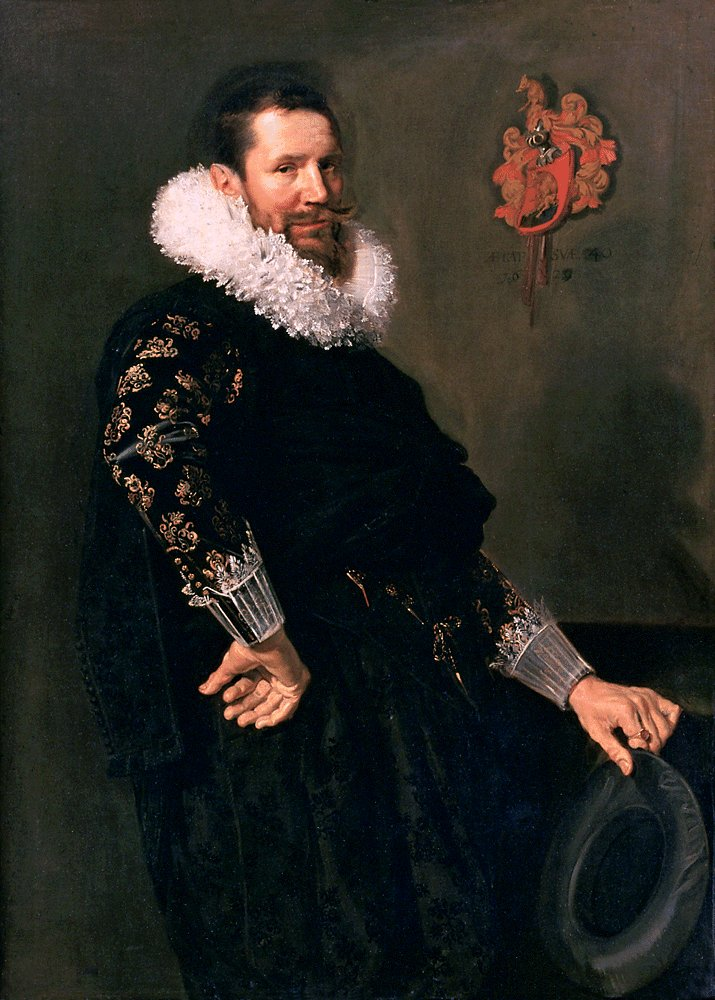
Paulus van Beresteyn, 1629, Louvre.

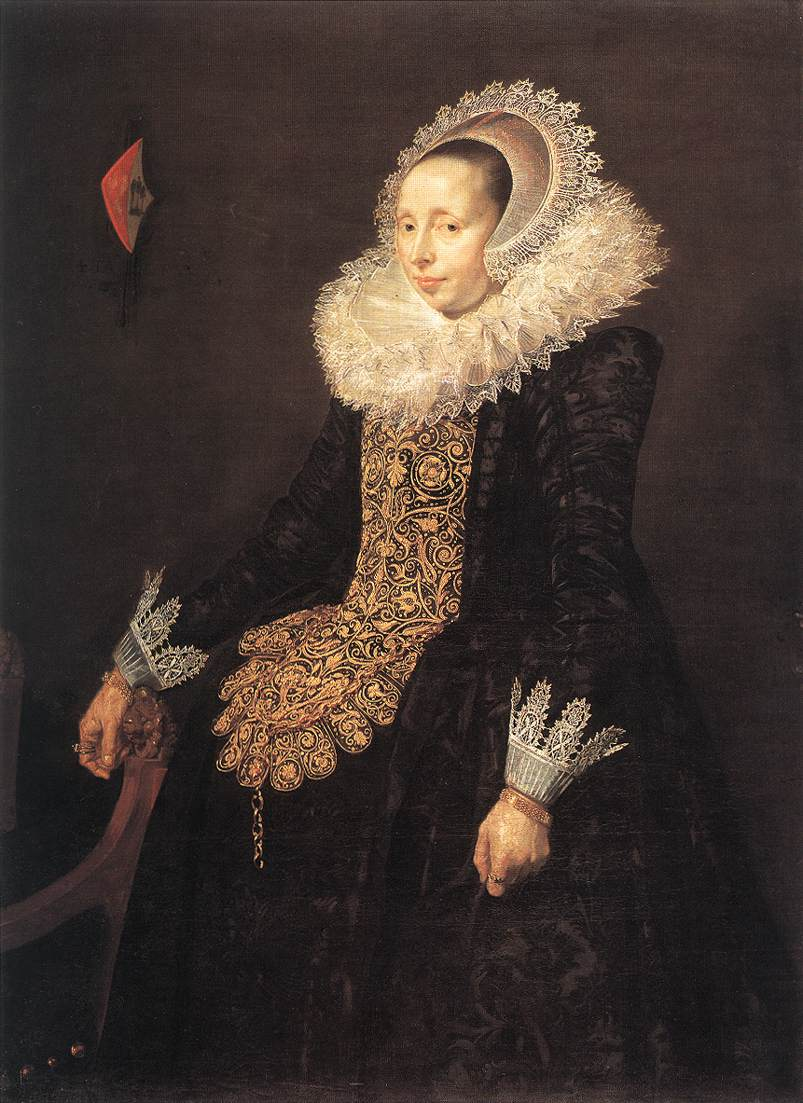
Catharina Both van der Eem, bride of Paulus Beresteyn, 1629, Louvre.

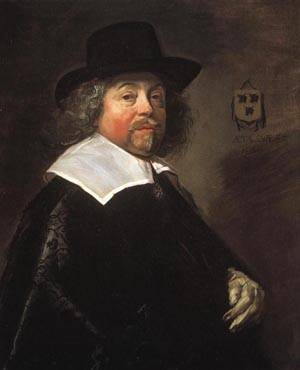
Joseph Coymans (1591–1660), the husband of Dorothea Berck, 1644, Wadsworth Atheneum.

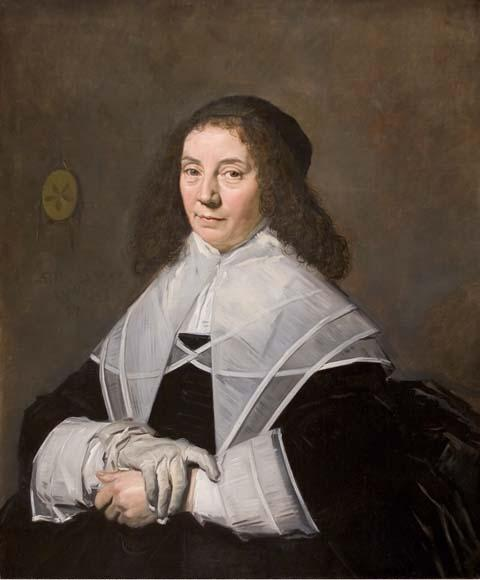
Dorothea Berck (1593–1684), wife of Joseph Coymans, 1644, Private Collection.

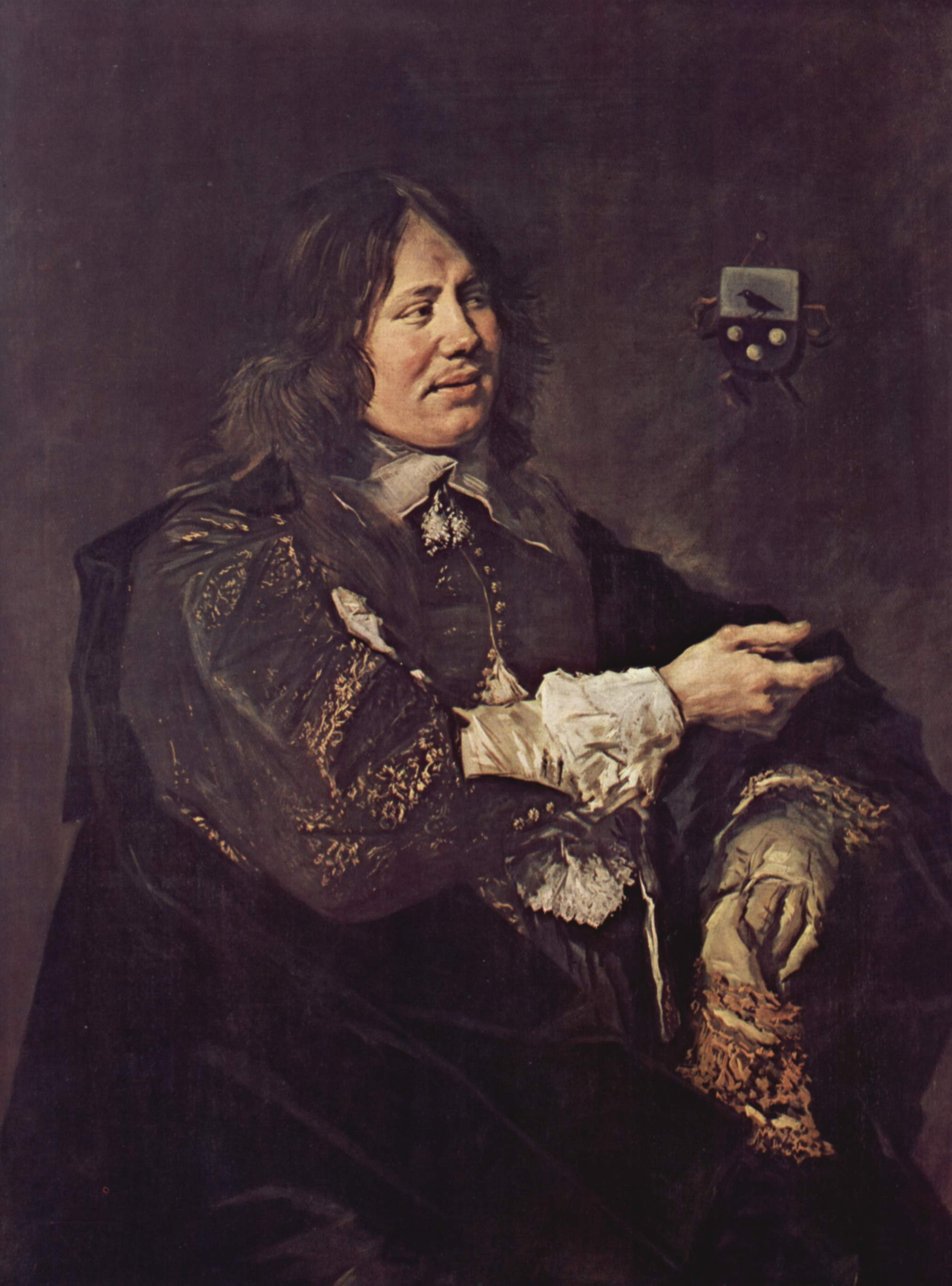
Portrait of Stephan Geraedts, husband of Isabella Coymans, 1652, Royal Museum of Fine Arts, Antwerp.

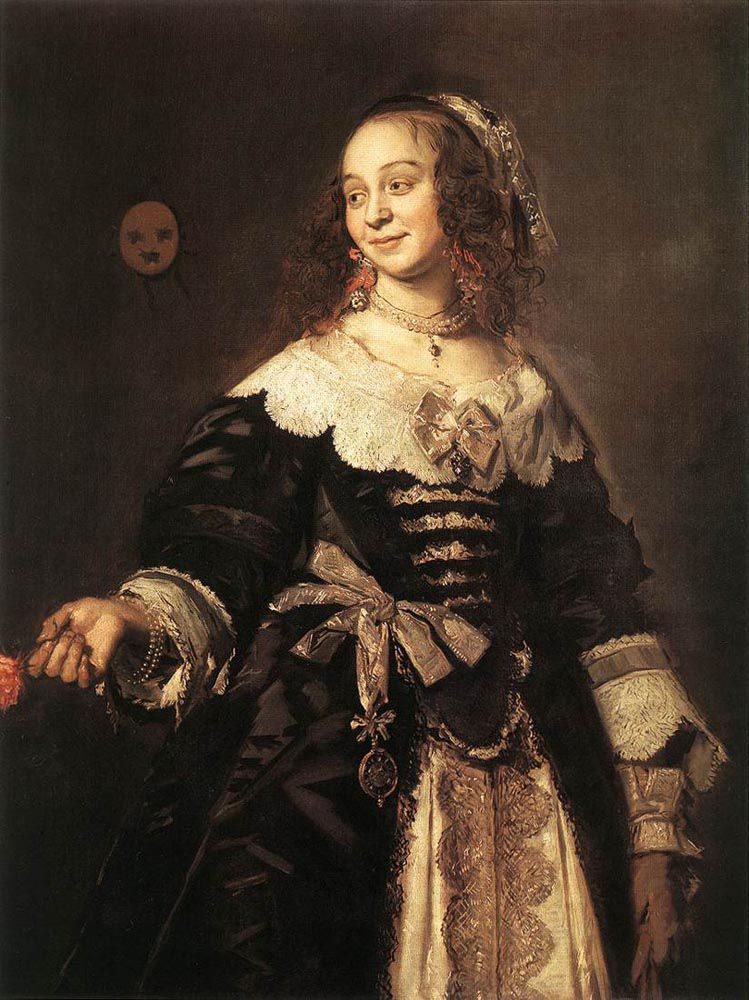
Isabella Coymans, wife of Stephan Geraedts, 1652, Private Collection.

The only record of his work in the first decade of his independent activity is an engraving by Jan van de Velde copied from the lost portrait of The Minister Johannes Bogardus. Early works by Hals show him as a careful draughtsman capable of great finish yet spirited, such as Two singing boys with a lute and a music book and Banquet of the Officers of the St George Militia (1616). The flesh that he painted is pastose and burnished, less clear than it subsequently became. Later, he became more effective, displayed more freedom of hand and a greater command of effect.

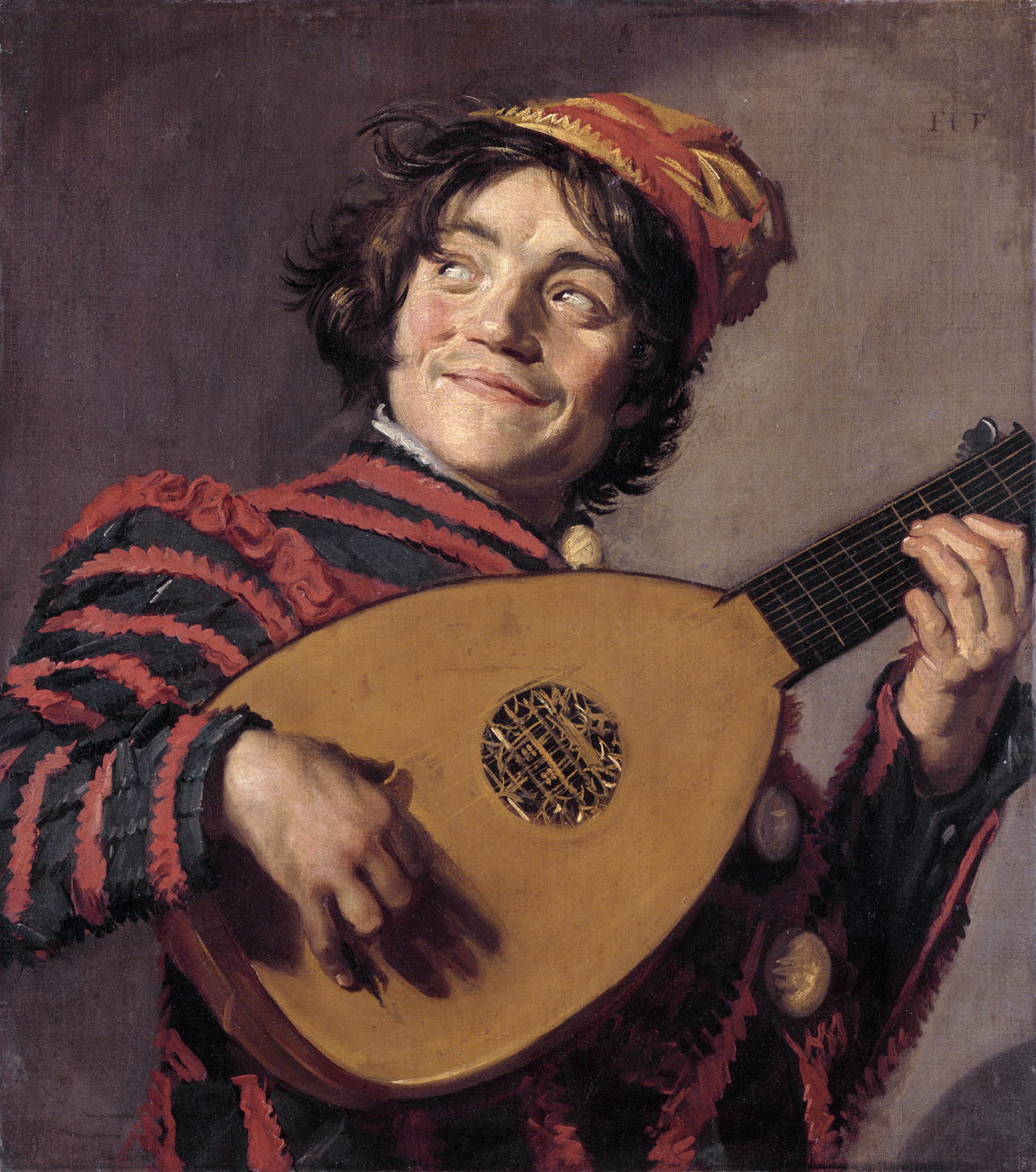
Jester with a Lute, 1620–1625, canvas, Musée du Louvre, Paris.

During this period, he painted the full-length portrait of Madame van Beresteyn (Louvre) and a full-length portrait of Willem van Heythuysen posing with a sword. Both these pictures are equalled by the other Banquet of the Officers of the St George Militia (with different portraits) and the same militia in 1627 and Banquet of the Officers of the St Hadrian Militia of 1633. A similar painting with the date of 1639 suggests some study of Rembrandt masterpieces, and a similar influence is apparent in a group portrait of 1641 representing the regents of the St Elisabeth Gasthuis and in his 1639 portrait of Maria Voogt at Amsterdam.

From 1620 till 1640, he painted many double portraits of married couples on separate panels, the man on the left panel and his wife on the right panel. Only once did Hals portray a couple on a single canvas: Couple in a garden: Wedding portrait of Isaac Abrahamsz. Massa and Beatrix van der Laan, (c. 1622, Rijksmuseum Amsterdam).

His style changed throughout his life. Paintings of vivid color were gradually replaced by pieces where mostly black came to dominate. This was probably due to the sober dress of his Protestant sitters, more than any personal preference. One simple way to observe this change is to look at all of the portraits that he painted through the years with his trademark pose leaning over the back of a chair:

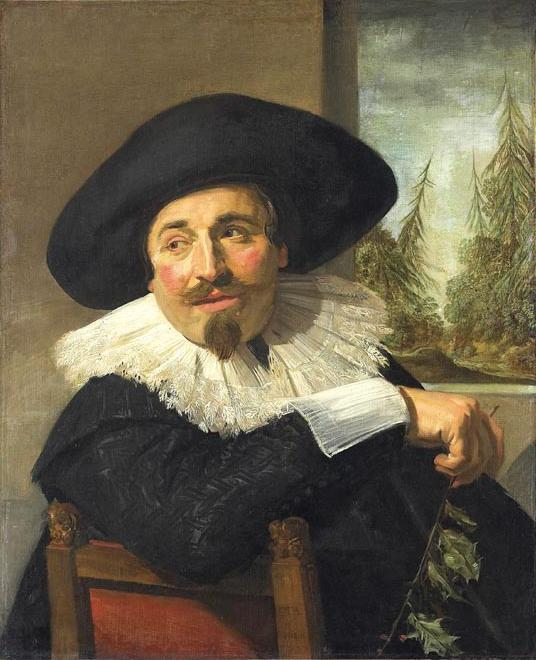
1626

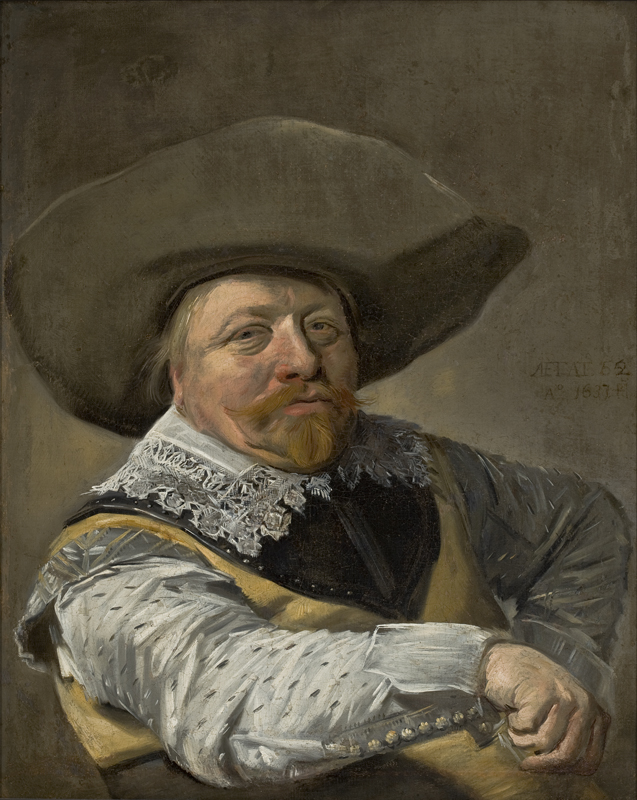
1631

1633

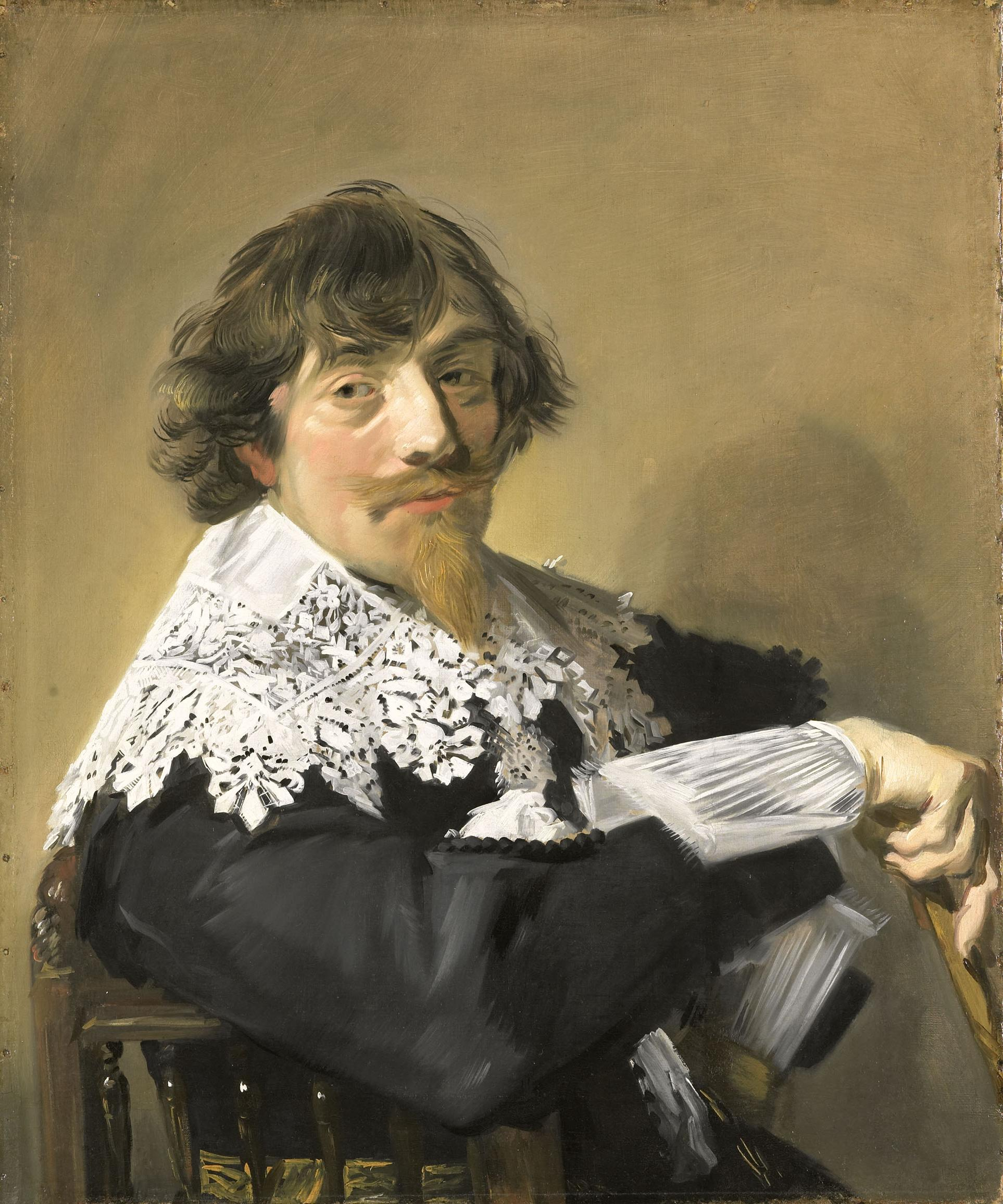
1635

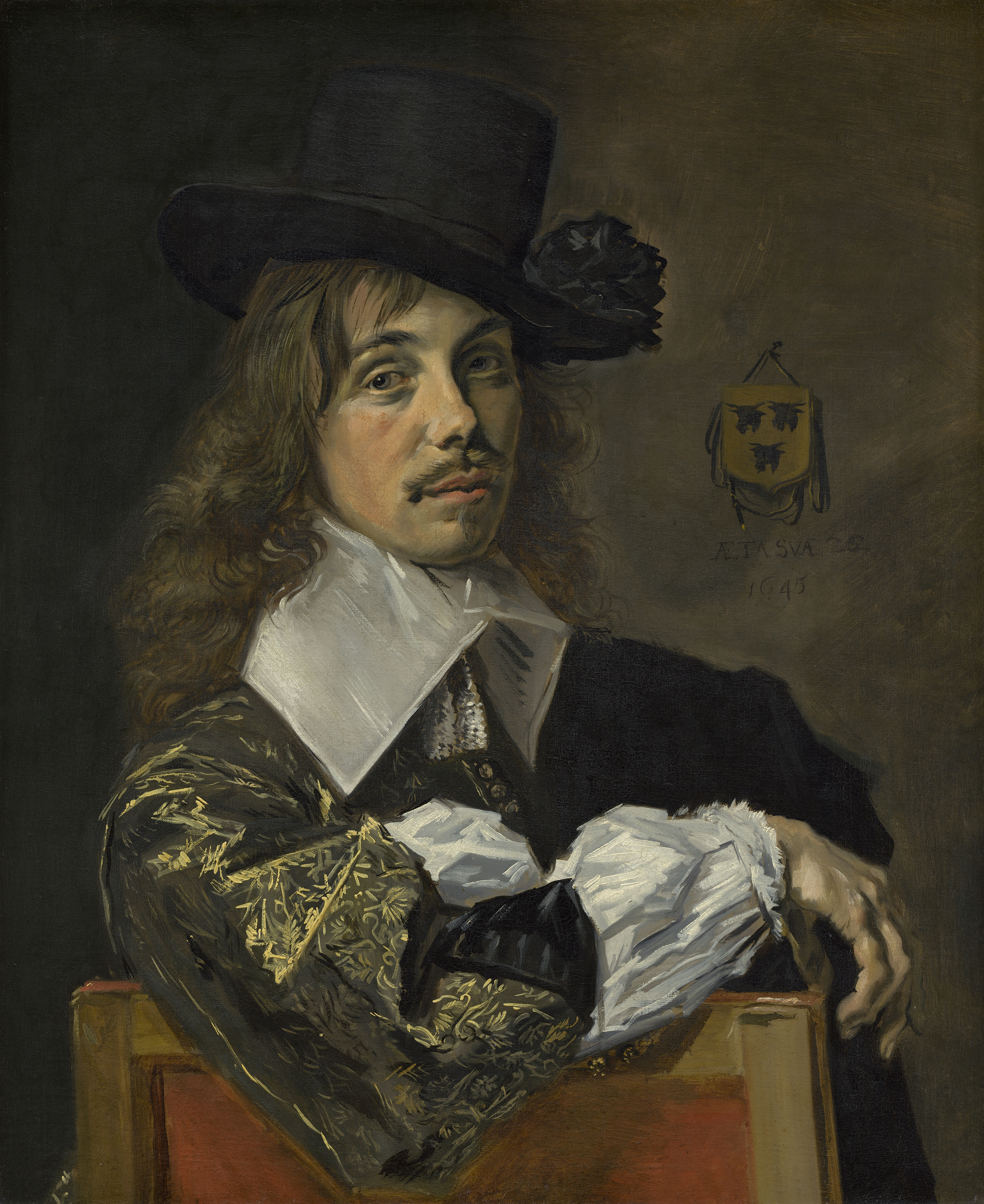
1645

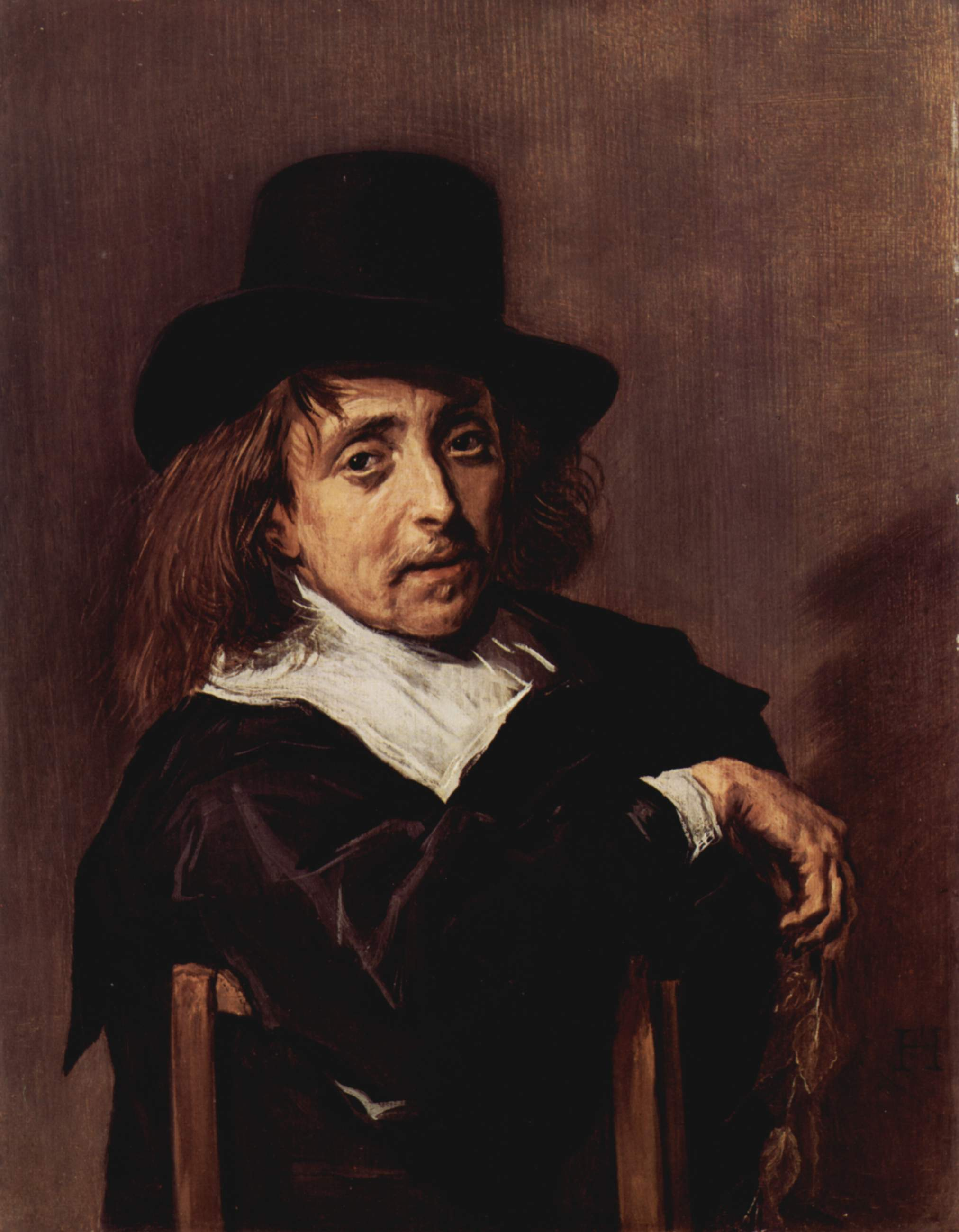
1645

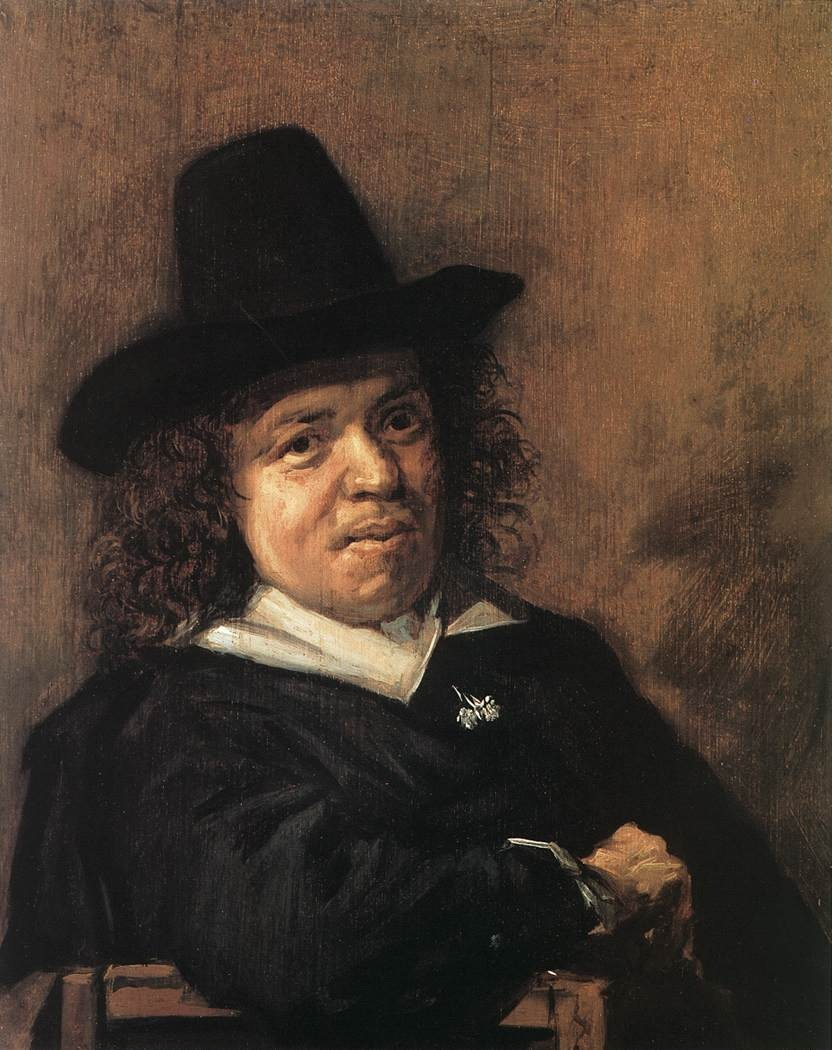
1655

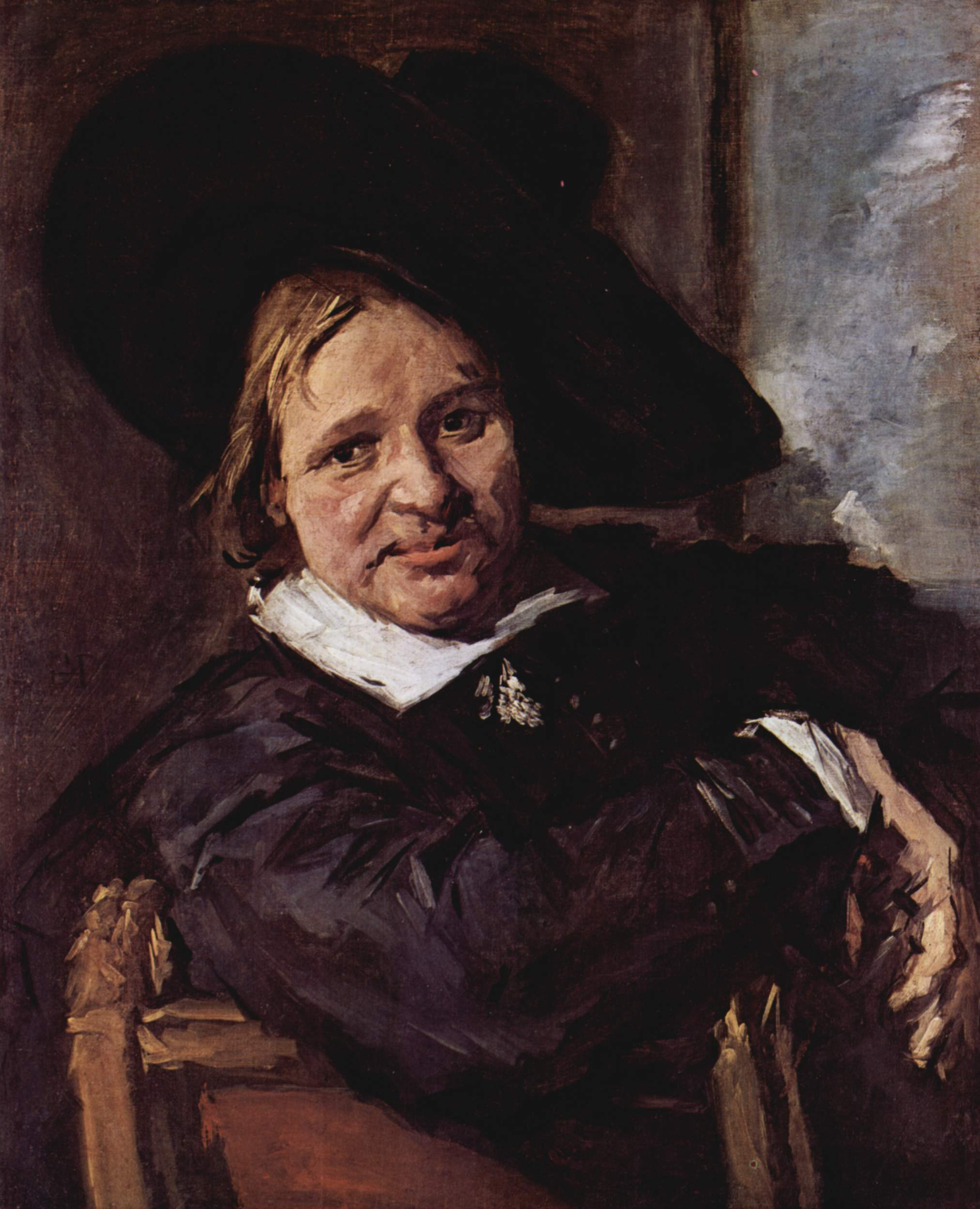
1665

== Portrait painter ==
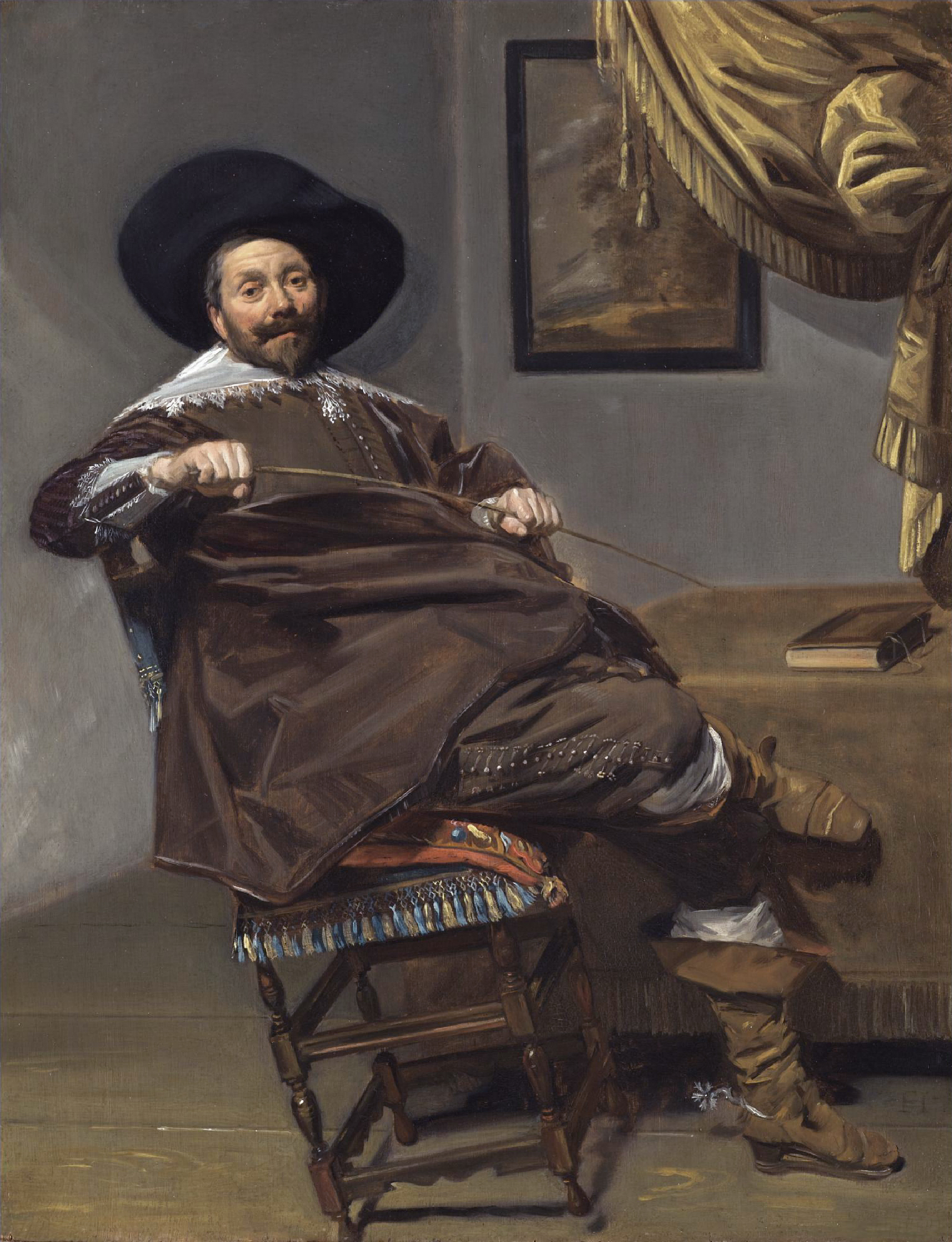
Willem van Heythuysen by Frans Hals (1634, one of two portraits of Van Heythuysen attributed to Hals).

Later in his life, his brush strokes became looser, fine detail becoming less important than the overall impression. His earlier pieces radiated gaiety and liveliness, while his later portraits emphasized the stature and dignity of the people portrayed. This austerity is displayed in Regents of the St Elizabeth Hospital in 1641 and, two decades later, The Regents and Regentesses of the Old Men's Almshouse (c. 1664), which are masterpieces of color, though in substance all but monochromes. His restricted palette is particularly noticeable in his flesh tints, which became greyer from year to year, until finally the shadows were painted in almost absolute black, as in the Tymane Oosdorp.

This tendency coincides with the period when Hals gained fewer commissions from the wealthy, and some historians have suggested that a reason for his predilection for black and white pigment was the low price of these colors as compared with the costly lakes and carmines. Both conclusions are probably correct, however, because Hals did not travel to his sitters, unlike his contemporaries, but let them come to him. This was good for business because he was exceptionally quick and efficient in his own well-fitted studio, but it was bad for business when Haarlem fell on hard times.

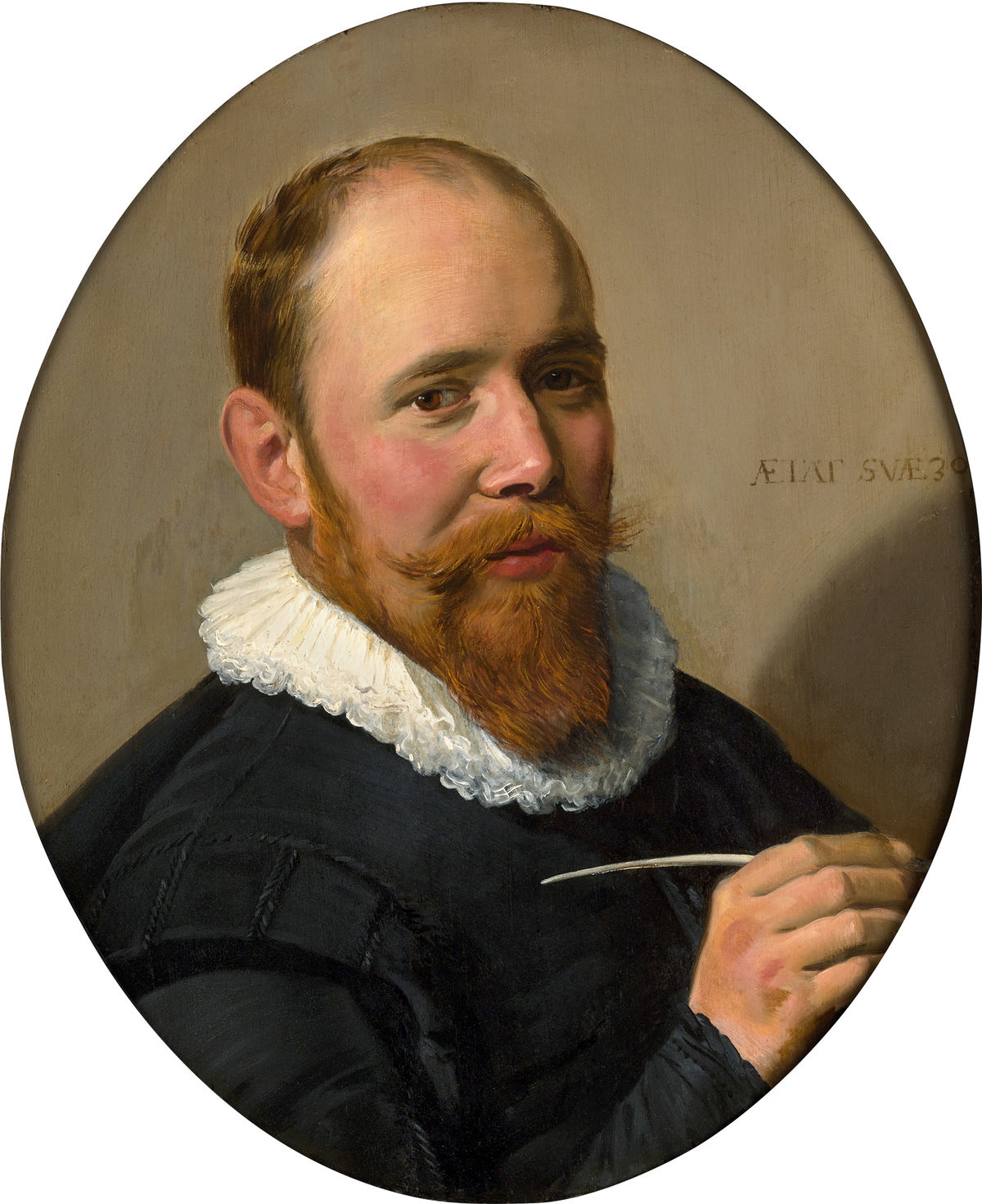
Portrait of a Gentleman, circa 1630; private collection

As a portrait painter, Hals generally displays less psychological insight than Rembrandt or Velázquez. In some works, like the Admiral de Ruyter, the Jacob Olycan, and the Albert van der Meer paintings, he presents a searching analysis of character which has little in common with the instantaneous expression of his character portraits. In these, he generally sets upon the canvas the fleeting aspect of the various stages of merriment, from the subtle, half ironic smile of the Laughing Cavalier to the grin of the Malle Babbe. Similar emphasis on fleeting expression appears in the Lute Player, the Gypsy Girl and the Laughing Fisherboy. The Marriage Portrait of Isaac Massa and Beatrix van der Laen and the Beresteyn Family at the Louvre also show a similar tendency. Less scattered in arrangement than the Beresteyn group, and one of Hals's most accomplished works, is the group called The Painter and his Family, which was almost unknown until it appeared at the winter exhibition at the Royal Academy in 1906.

According to the Frans Hals catalogue raisonné, 1974, 222 known paintings can be ascribed to Hals. This list was compiled by Seymour Slive in 1970−1974 who also wrote an exhibition catalogue in 1989 and produced an update to his catalogue raisonné work in 2014. In 1989, another authority on Hals, Claus Grimm, disagreed with Slive and published a shorter œuvre of 145 paintings in his Frans Hals. Das Gesamtwerk.

It is not known whether Hals ever painted landscapes, still lifes or narrative pieces, but it is unlikely. His debut for Haarlem society in 1616 with his large group portrait for the St George militia shows all three disciplines, but if that painting was his signboard for future commissions, it seems he was subsequently only hired for portraits. Many artists in the 17th century in Holland opted to specialise, and Hals also appears to have been a pure portrait specialist.

== Painting technique ==
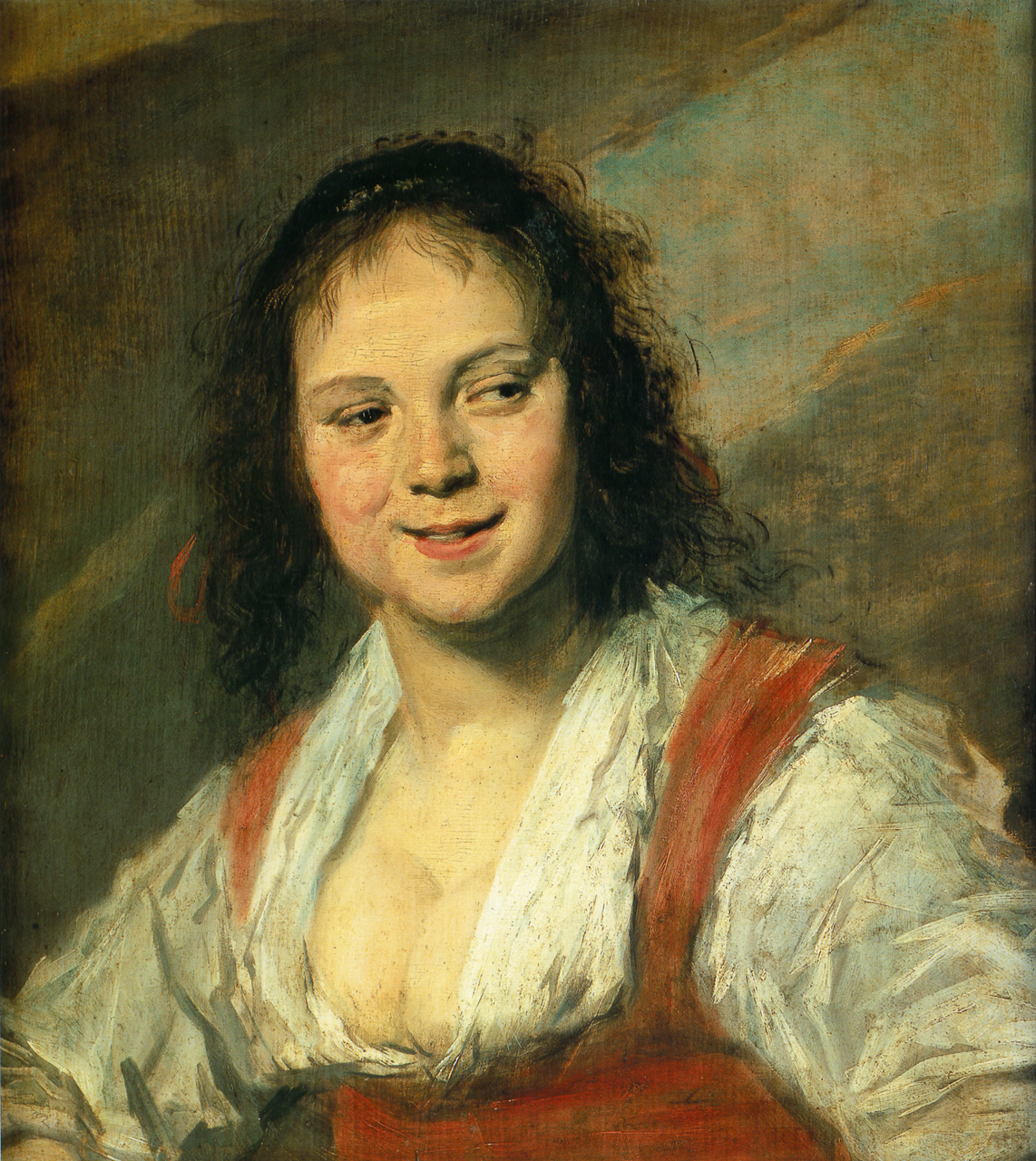
Frans Hals. The Gypsy Girl. 1628–30. Oil on wood, 58 x 52 cm. Musée du Louvre, Paris.

Hals was a master of a technique that utilized something previously seen as a flaw in painting, the visible brushstroke. The soft curling lines of Hals's brush are always clear upon the surface: "materially just lying there, flat, while conjuring substance and space in the eye." In this way his style was similar to Édouard Manet; in fact, Hals was described by author Raymond Cogniat as "the Manet of his day." Lively and exciting, the technique can appear "ostensibly slapdash" – people often think that Hals 'threw' his works 'in one toss' (aus einem Guss) onto the canvas. This impression is not correct. Hals did occasionally paint without underdrawings or underpainting (alla prima), but most of the works were created in successive layers, as was customary at that time. Sometimes a drawing was made with chalk or paint on top of a grey or pink undercoat, and was then more or less filled in, in stages. It does seem that Hals usually applied his underpainting very loosely: he was a virtuoso from the beginning. This applies, of course, particularly to his genre works and his somewhat later, mature works. Hals displayed tremendous daring, great courage and virtuosity, and had a great capacity to pull back his hands from the canvas, or panel, at the moment of the most telling statement. He didn't 'paint them to death', as many of his contemporaries did, in their great accuracy and diligence whether requested by their clients or not.

In the 17th century his first biographer, Schrevelius wrote: "An unusual manner of painting, all his own, surpassing almost everyone," on Hals's painting methods. For that matter, schematic painting was not Hals's own idea (the approach already existed in 16th century Italy), and Hals was probably inspired by Flemish contemporaries, Rubens and Van Dyck, in his painting method. Haarlem resident Theodorus Schrevelius was struck by the vitality of Hals's portraits which reflected 'such power and life' that the painter 'seems to challenge nature with his brush'.

== Influence ==
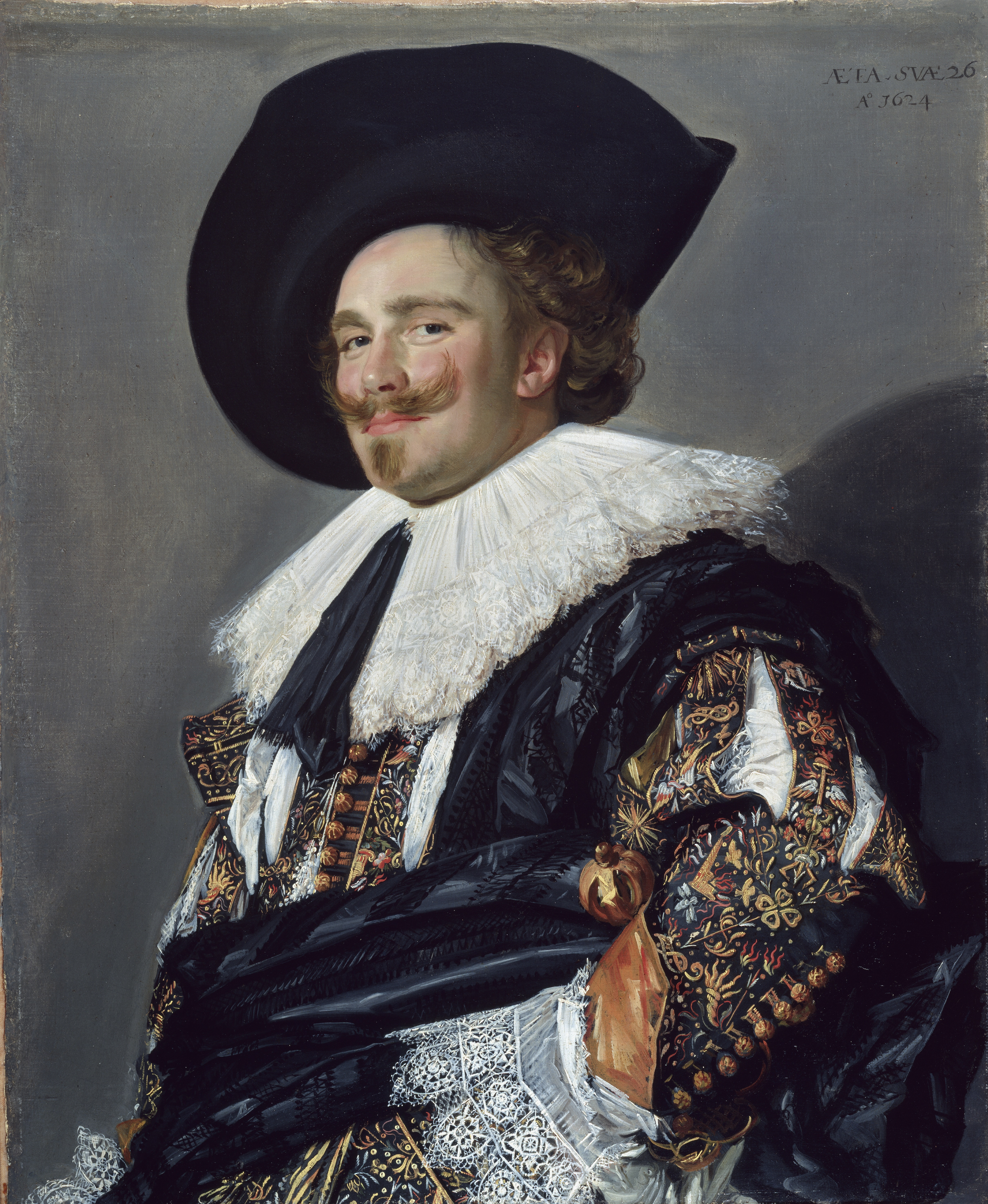
Laughing Cavalier, 1624, canvas, relined, (H) 83 cm x (W) 67 cm, Wallace Collection, London.

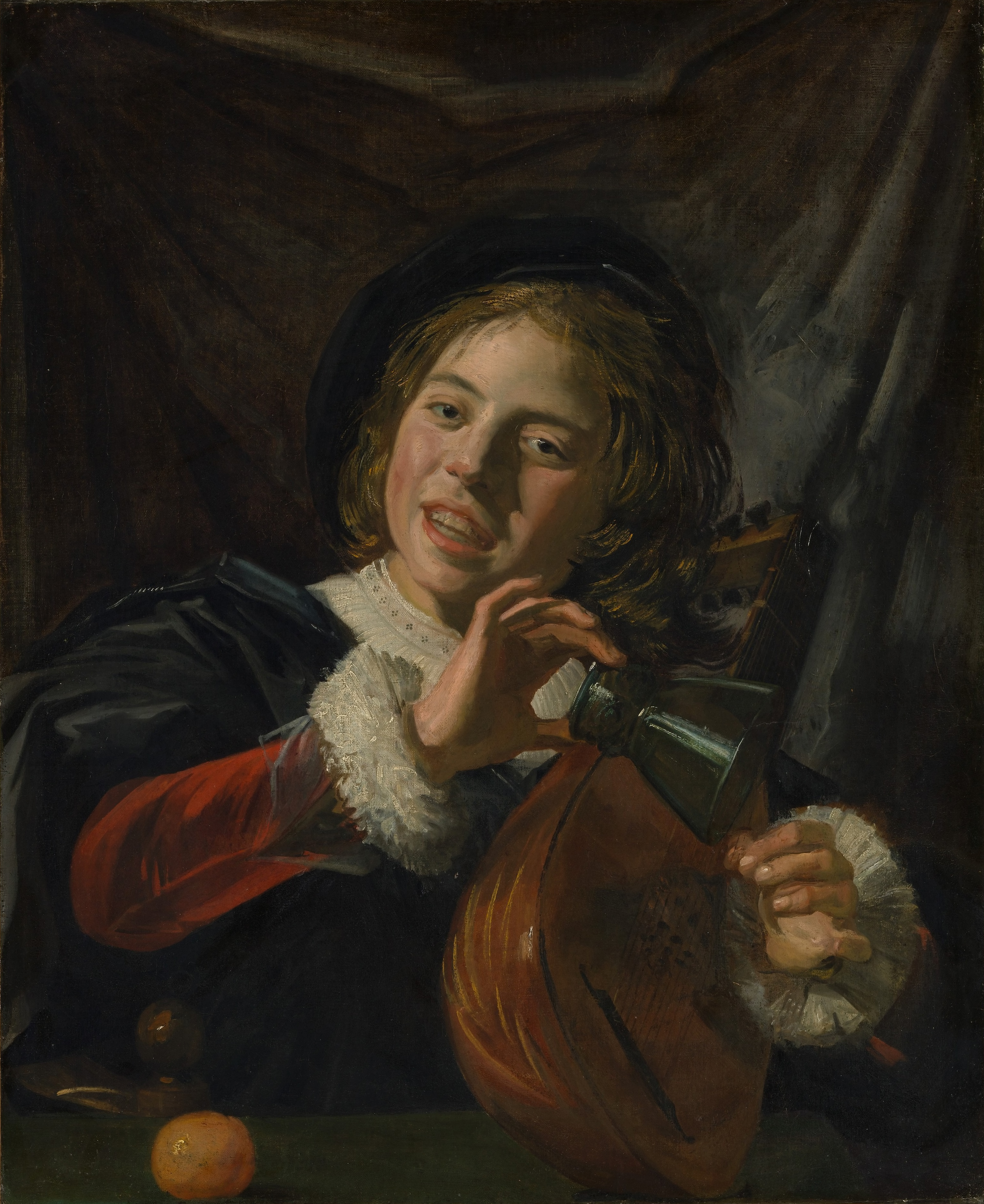
Boy with a lute c. 1625 The Metropolitan Museum of Art

Frans influenced his brother Dirck Hals (born at Haarlem, 1591–1656), who was also a painter. Additionally, five of his sons became painters:

- Harmen Hals (1611–1669)
- Frans Hals the Younger (1618–1669)
- Jan Hals (1620–1654)
- Reynier Hals (1627–1672)
- Nicolaes Hals (1628–1686)

Though most of his sons became portrait painters, some of them took up still-life painting or architectural studies and landscapes. Still lifes formerly attributed to his son Frans II have since been re-attributed to other painters, however. Hals painted a young woman reaching into a basket in a still life market scene by Claes van Heussen.

Other contemporary painters who took inspiration from Hals were, with the main cities they were based in:

- Jan Miense Molenaer (1609–1668), Haarlem and Amsterdam
- Judith Leyster (wife of Molenaer, 1609–1660), Haarlem and Amsterdam
- Adriaen van Ostade (1610–1685), Haarlem
- Adriaen Brouwer (1605–1638), mostly Antwerp
- Johannes Cornelisz Verspronck (1597–1662), Haarlem
- Bartholomeus van der Helst (1613–1670), Amsterdam
- Cornelis de Bie (1621–1664), Amsterdam

Hals had a large workshop in Haarlem and many students, though 19th century biographers questioned some of his pupils, since their painting styles were so dissimilar to Hals. In his De Groote Schouburgh (1718–21), Arnold Houbraken mentions Philips Wouwerman, Adriaen Brouwer, Pieter Gerritsz van Roestraten, Adriaen van Ostade and Dirck van Delen as students. Vincent Laurensz van der Vinne was also a student, according to his diary with notes left by his son Laurens Vincentsz van der Vinne. Roestraten was not only a student (the Haarlem archives contain a notarised document, which supports this fact), but he also became a son-in-law of Hals when he married his daughter Adriaentje. The Haarlem portrait painter, Johannes Verspronck, one of about 10 competing portraitists in Haarlem at the time, possibly studied for some time with Hals.

In terms of style, the closest to Hals's work is the handful of paintings that are ascribed to Judith Leyster, which she often signed. She also 'qualifies' as a possible student, as does her husband, the painter Jan Miense Molenaer.

In the 19th century, his technique influenced the work of impressionists and realists including Claude Monet, Édouard Manet, Charles-François Daubigny, Max Liebermann, James Abbott McNeill Whistler, Gustave Courbet, and in the Netherlands, Jacobus van Looy and Isaac Israëls. Lovis Corinth named Hals as his biggest influence.

The Post-Impressionist artist Vincent van Gogh wrote to his brother Theo: 'What a joy it is to see a Frans Hals, how different it is from the paintings – so many of them – where everything is carefully smoothed out in the same manner.' Hals chose not to give a smooth finish to his painting, as most of his contemporaries did, but mimicked the vitality of his subject by using smears, lines, spots, large patches of color and hardly any details.

== Legacy ==
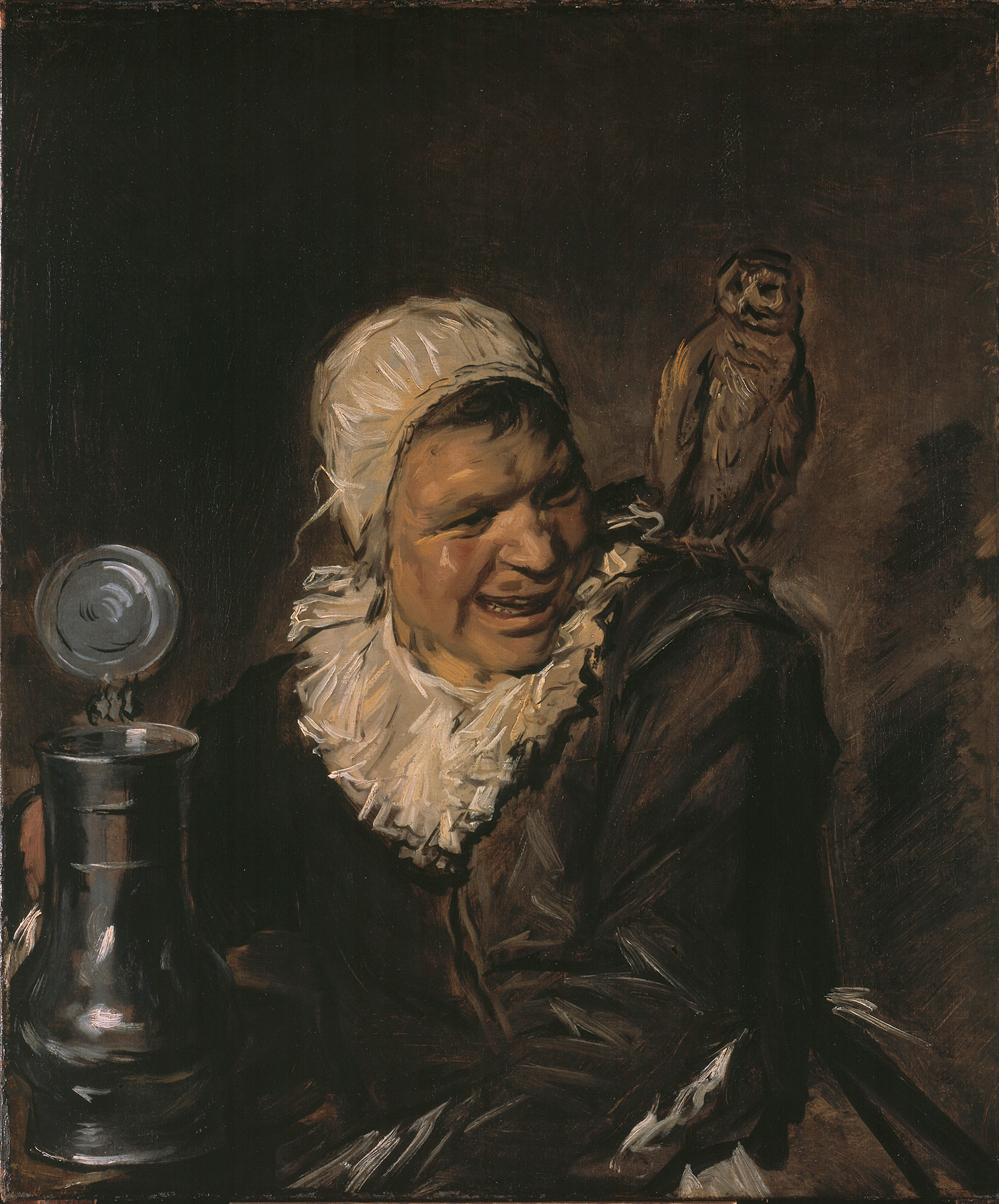
Malle Babbe, c. 1630. Oil on canvas, 75 cm by 64 cm. Staatliche Museen, Berlin.

The 1911 Encyclopædia Britannica has an article on Frans Hals by Paul George Konody, who observes: Hals's reputation waned after his death and for two centuries he was held in such poor esteem that some of his paintings, which are now among the proudest possessions of public galleries, were sold at auction for a few pounds or even shillings. The portrait of Johannes Acronius realized five shillings at the Enschede sale in 1786. The Portrait of Willem van Heythuysen at the Alte Pinakothek sold in 1800 for £4: 5s (£4.25 in decimal notation).

Nevertheless, Hals's art did not go altogether unappreciated in the time between his death in 1666 and the 1860s. In his Groote Schouburgh (1718–1721), Arnold Houbraken recorded Hals's life and praised his style, adding that the figures in one of the large group portraits: ... zoo kragtig en natuurlyk geschildert zyn, dat zy de aanschouwers schynen te willen aanspreken ("... are painted so powerfully and naturally, they seem to want to talk to us"). Dutch artists known to have admired Hals enough to make copies of his paintings include Cornelis van Noorde (1731–1795) and Wybrand Hendricks (1744–1831). Empress Catherine the Great (reigned 1762–1796) acquired ten Hals works for her collection. Jean-Honoré Fragonard (1732–1806) visited the Alte Pinakothek to copy Hals's work, and Hals's influence is apparent in Fragonard's portraits de fantaisie. Antoine Watteau (1684–1721) made study sketches after Hals. At the Royal Academy in London, Joshua Reynolds (1723–1792) lectured on Hals in 1774, praising his handling of faces and the consequent remarkable individuality of his portraits. Reynolds was less enthusiastic about Hals's characteristic loose finish, which he thought betrayed impatience. Subsequently, in 1781 Reynolds visited the Hals collection then at Haarlem City Hall (now at the Frans Hals Museum) and soon after bought two Hals works. Reynolds's biographer James Northcote (1736–1831), who was a fellow portraitist, remarked that Hals could have caught a bird in flight, grasping it, as it were, from life – something he said Titian would not have been capable of.

Starting at the middle of the 1860s his prestige rose again thanks to the efforts of critic Théophile Thoré-Bürger. With his rehabilitation in public esteem came the enormous rise in value, and, at the Secretan sale in 1889, the portrait of Pieter van den Broecke was bid up to 4,420 francs, while in 1908 the National Gallery paid £25,000 for the large family group from the collection of Baron Talbot de Malahide.

Hals's work remains admired, particularly with young painters who can find many lessons about practical technique from his unconcealed brushstrokes. Hals's works have found their way to countless cities all over the world and into museum collections. From the late 19th century, they were collected everywhere—from Antwerp to Toronto, and from London to New York. Many of his paintings were then sold to American collectors.

Several of his most important works are owned by the town council of Haarlem. They are now at the Frans Hals Museum in the Groot Heiligland, Haarlem. Before 1913 they hung in the Haarlem City Hall, where Impressionists went to see them.

The Hals crater on Mercury is named in his honour.

Hals was pictured on the Netherlands' 10-guilder banknote of 1968.

The Banquet of the Officers of the St George Militia Company in 1616 appears on the restaurant wall in the 1989 Peter Greenaway film The Cook, the Thief, His Wife & Her Lover.

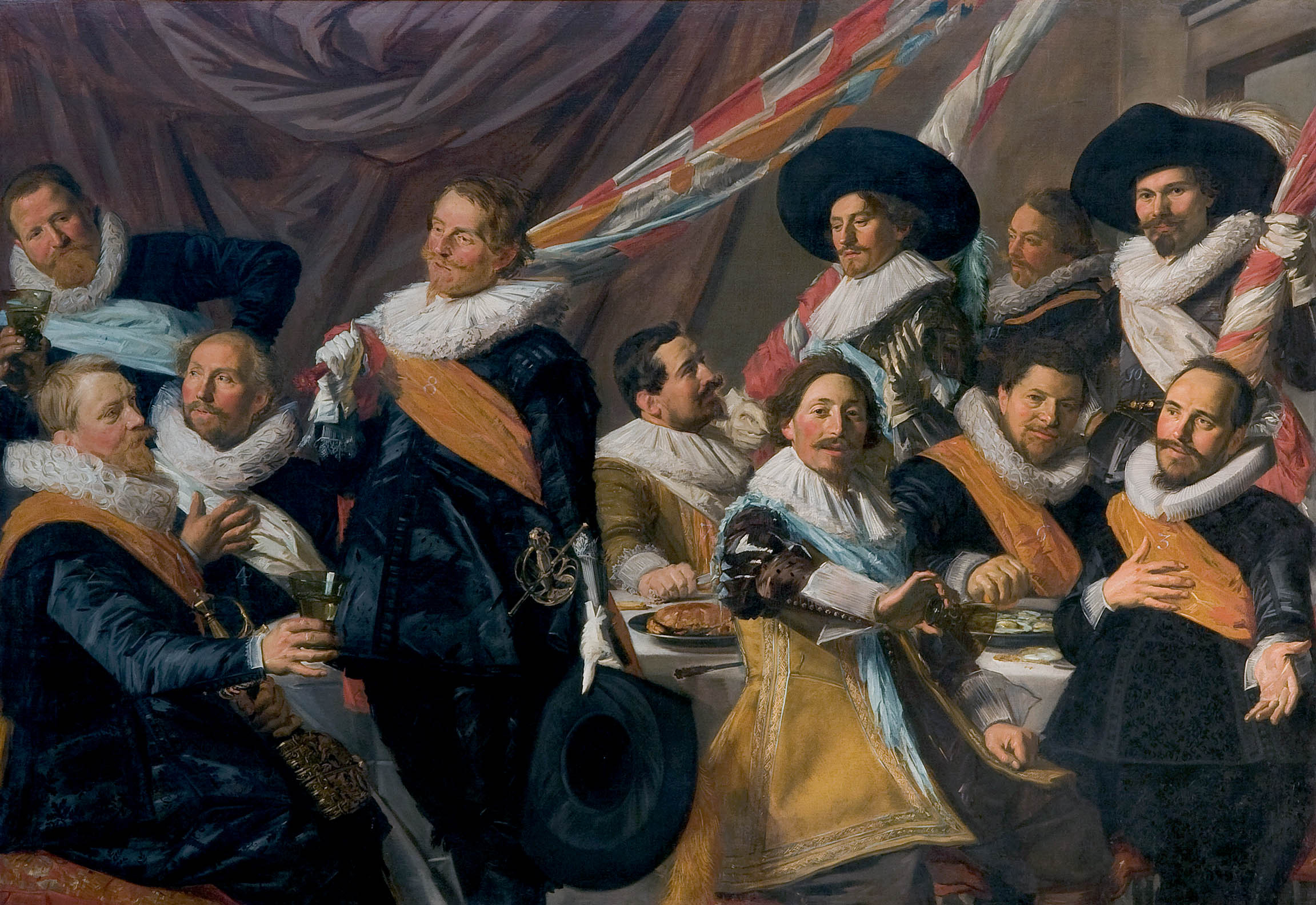
The Banquet of the Officers of the St George Militia Company in 1627

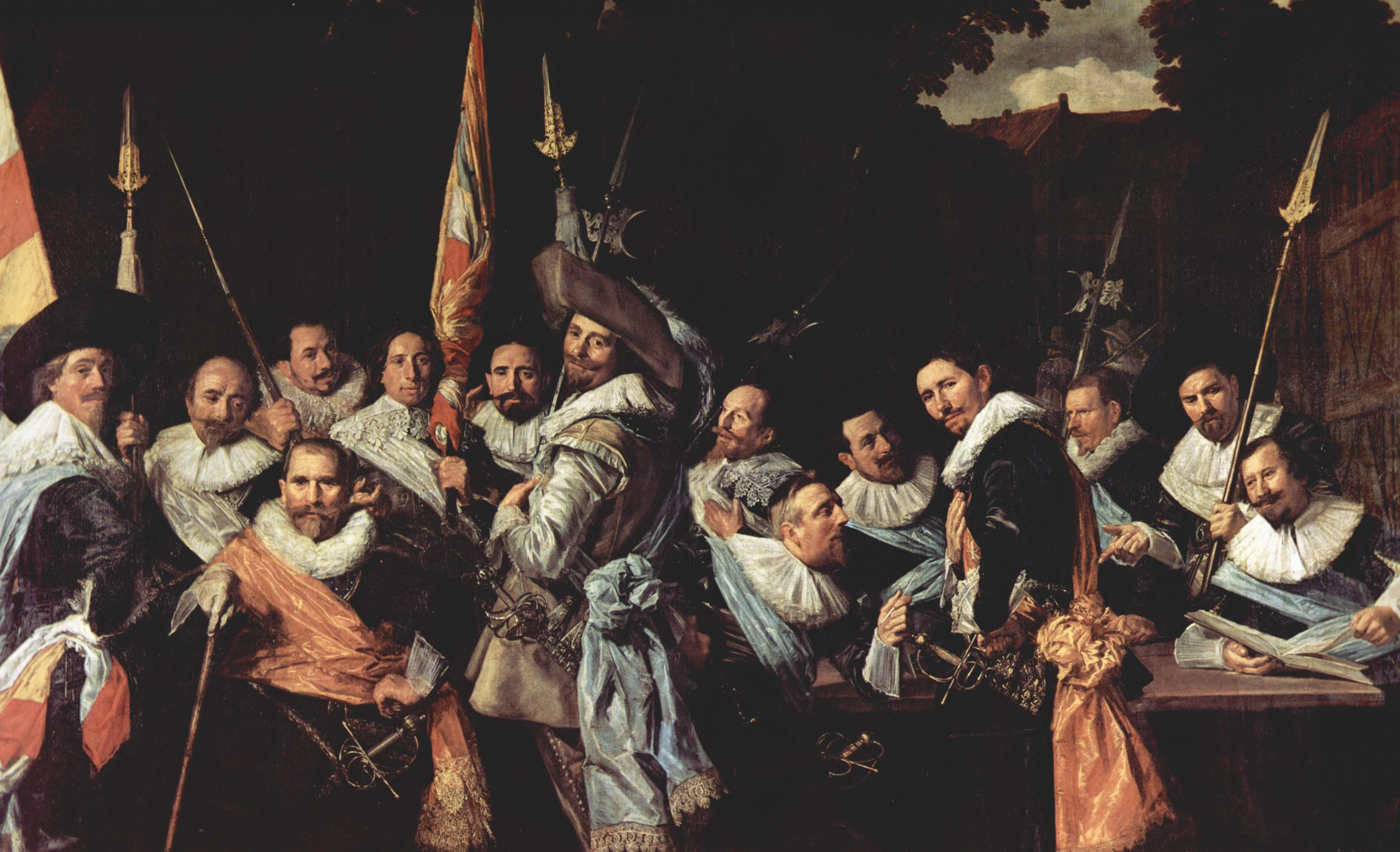
The Officers of the St Adrian Militia Company in 1633

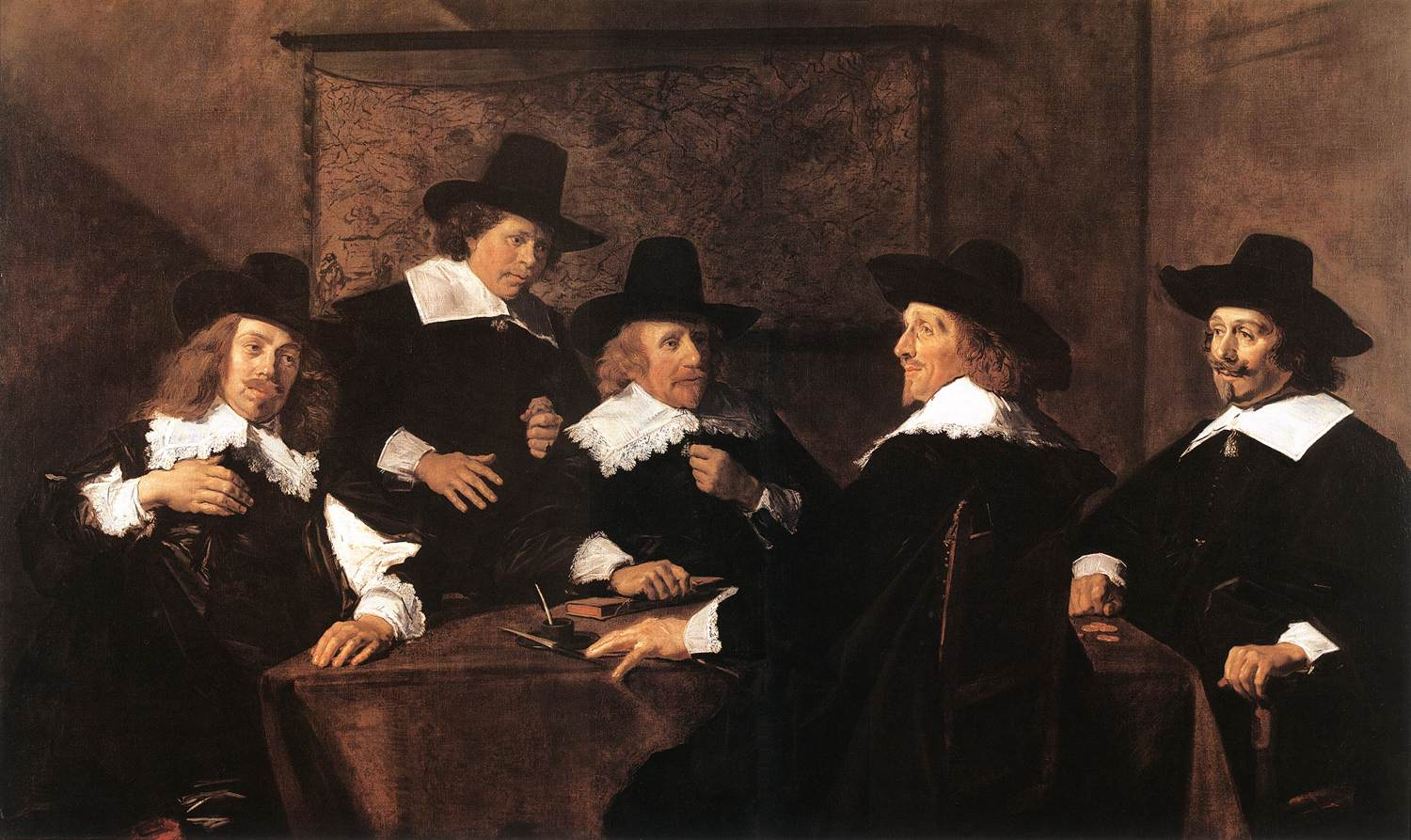
Regents of the St Elizabeth Hospital of Haarlem, 1641

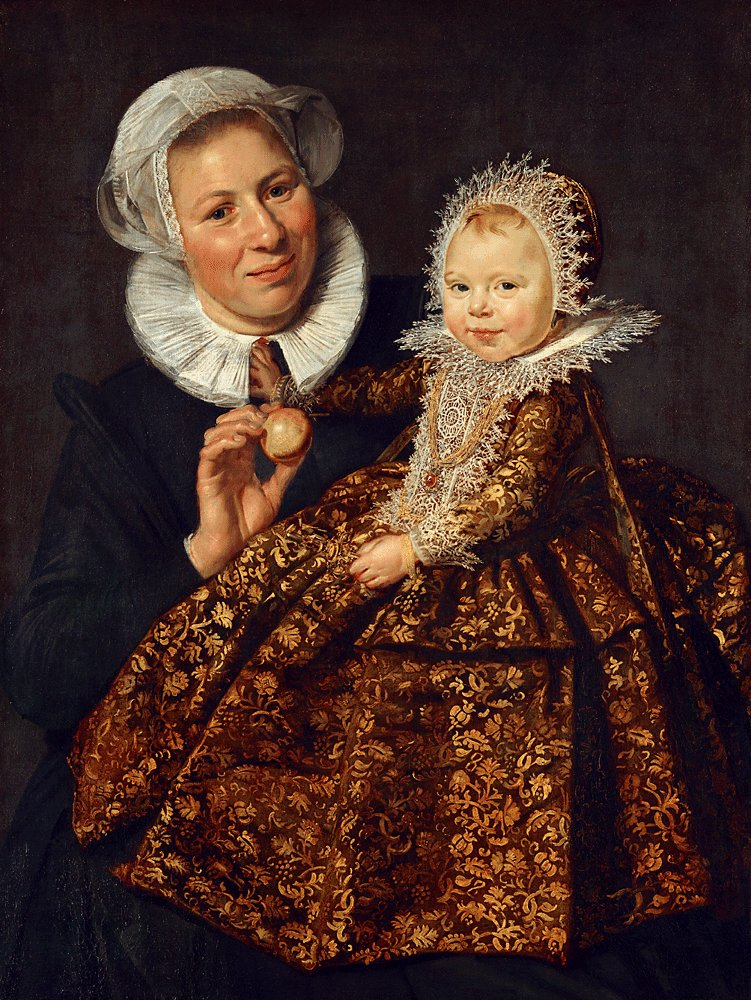
Catharina Hooft with her Nurse, c. 1619–1620

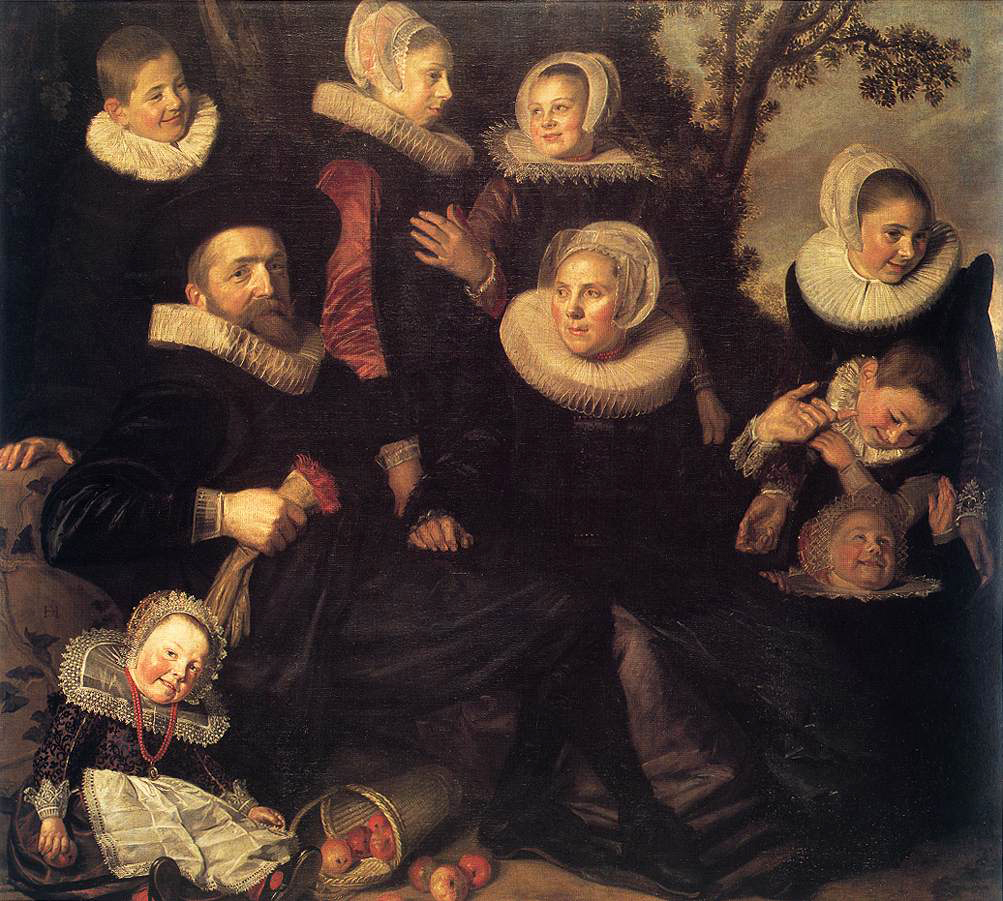
Family Portrait of Gijsbert Claesz van Campen in a Landscape, c. 1620

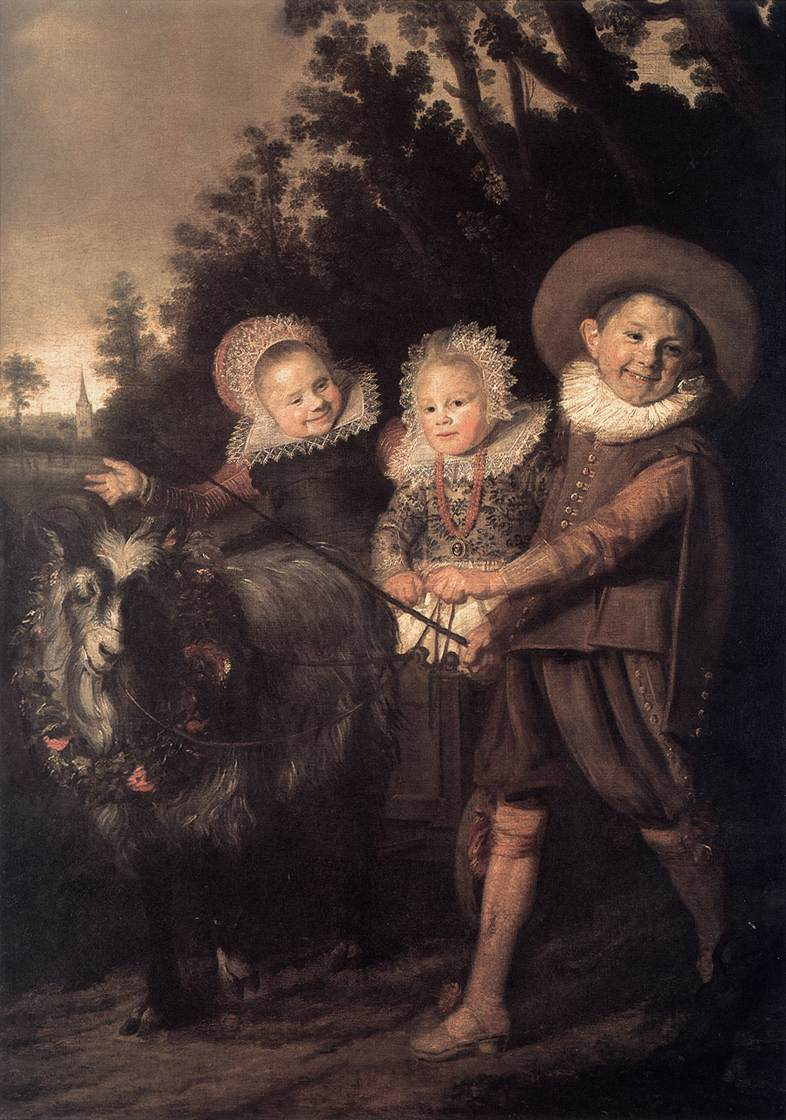
Three Children with a Goat Cart, c. 1620

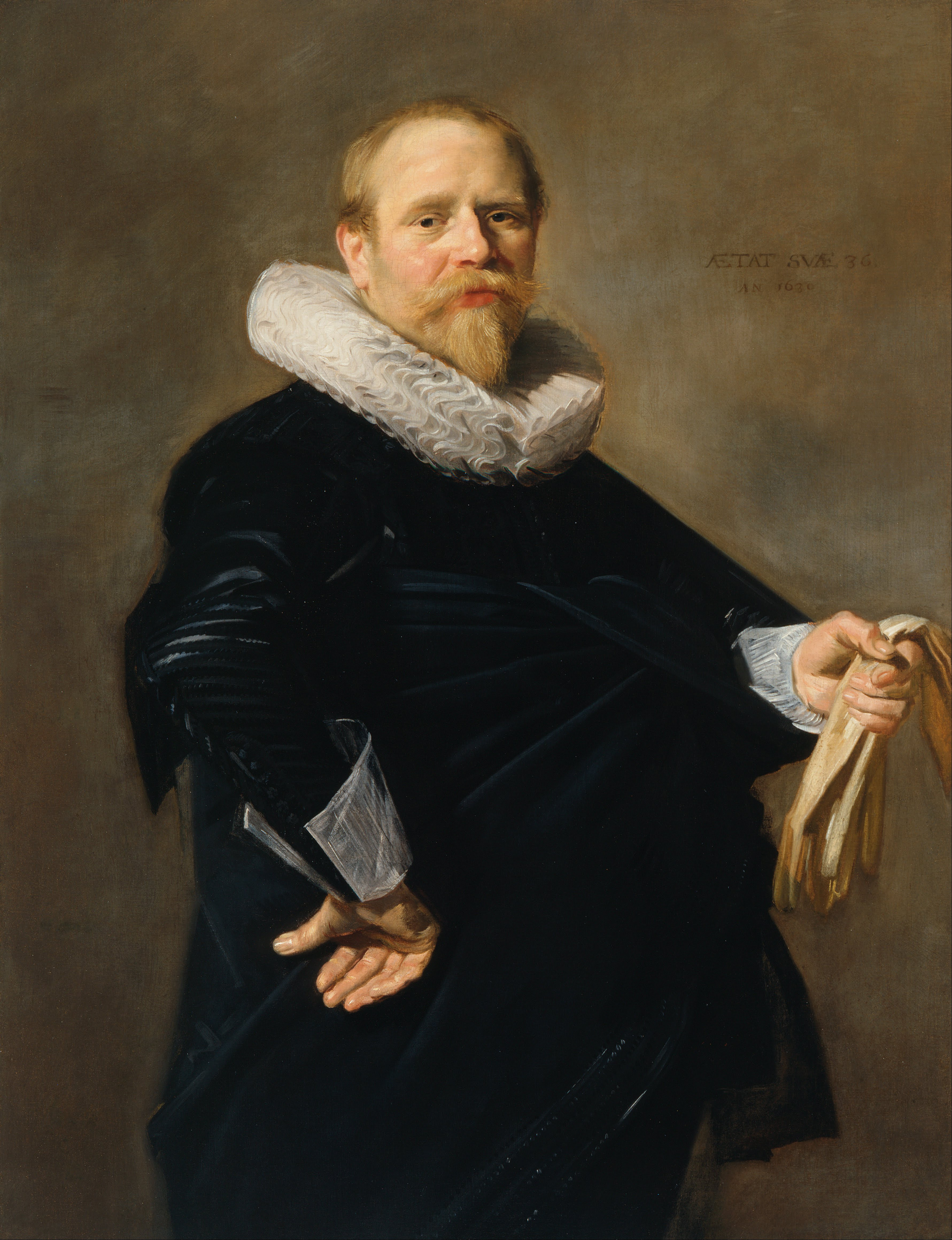
Portrait of a Man, 1630

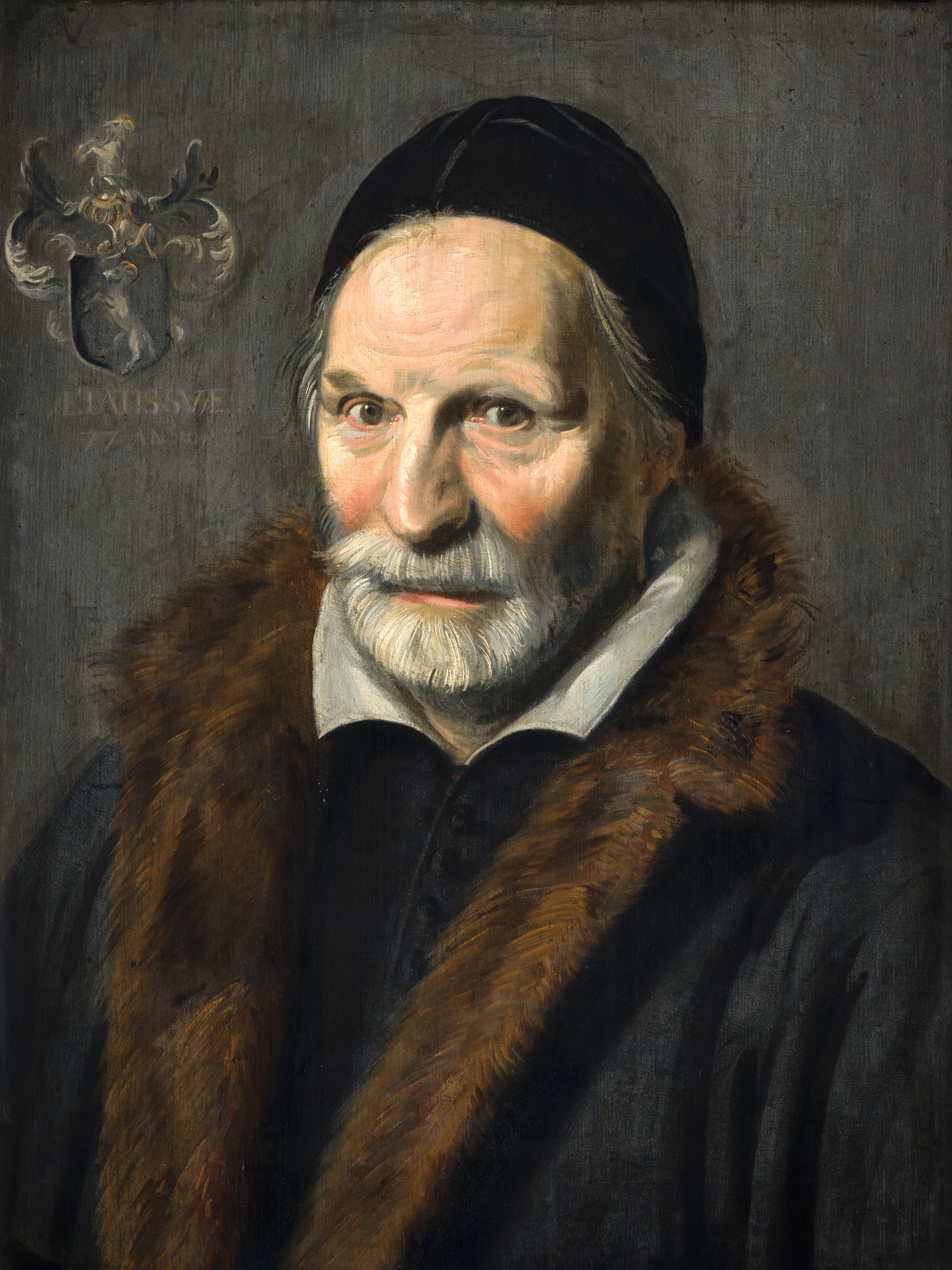
Jacobus Zaffius, 1611

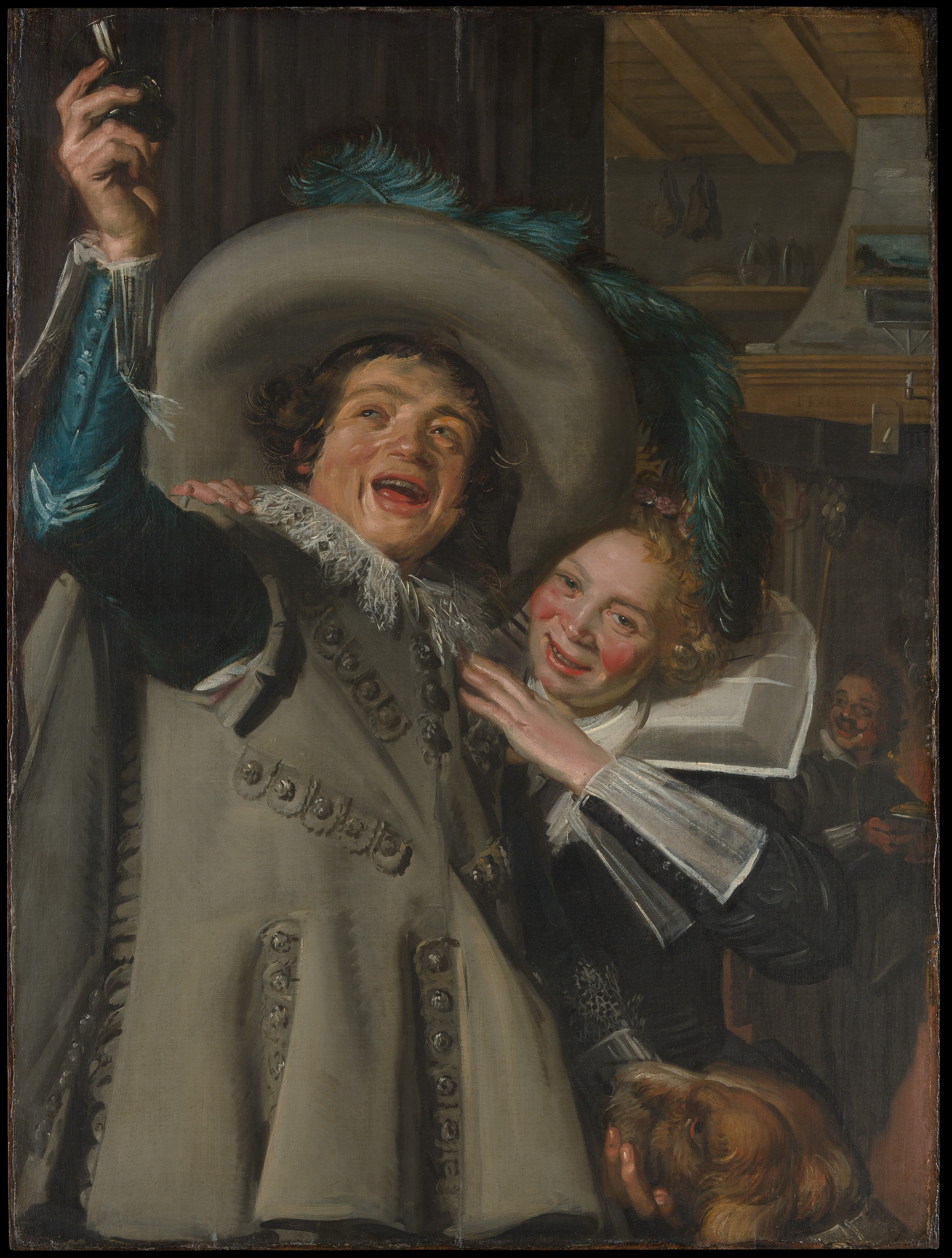
Yonker Ramp and His Sweetheart, 1623

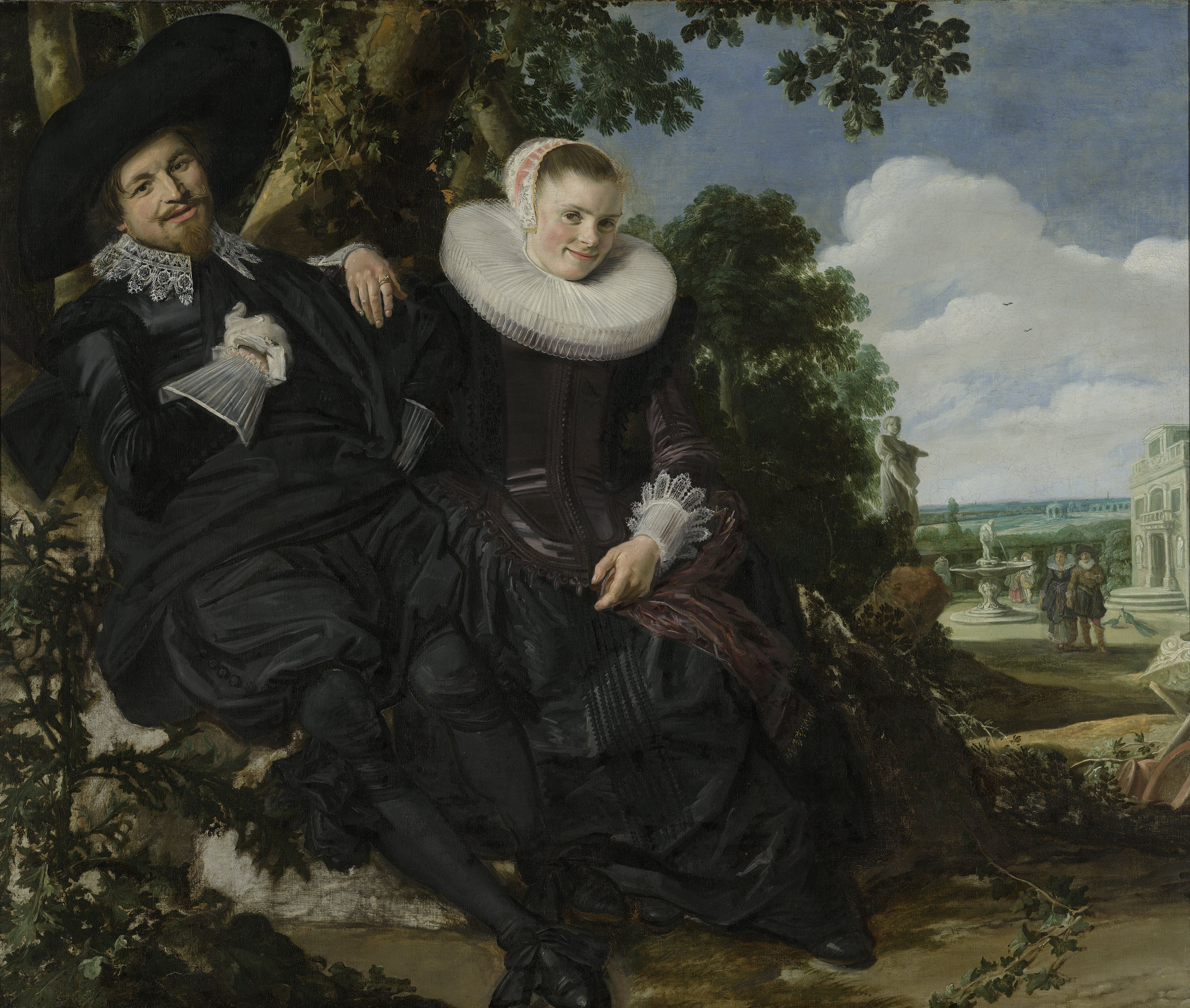
Married Couple in a Garden, 1622

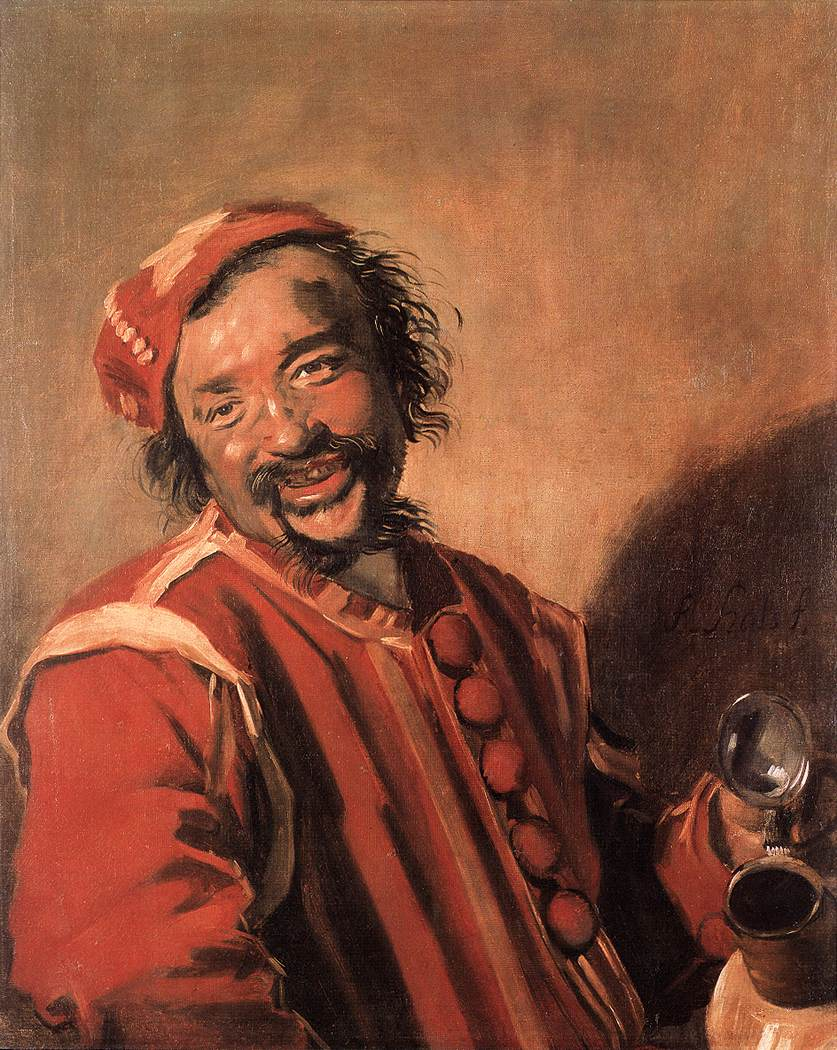
Peeckelhaeringh, c. 1628–1630

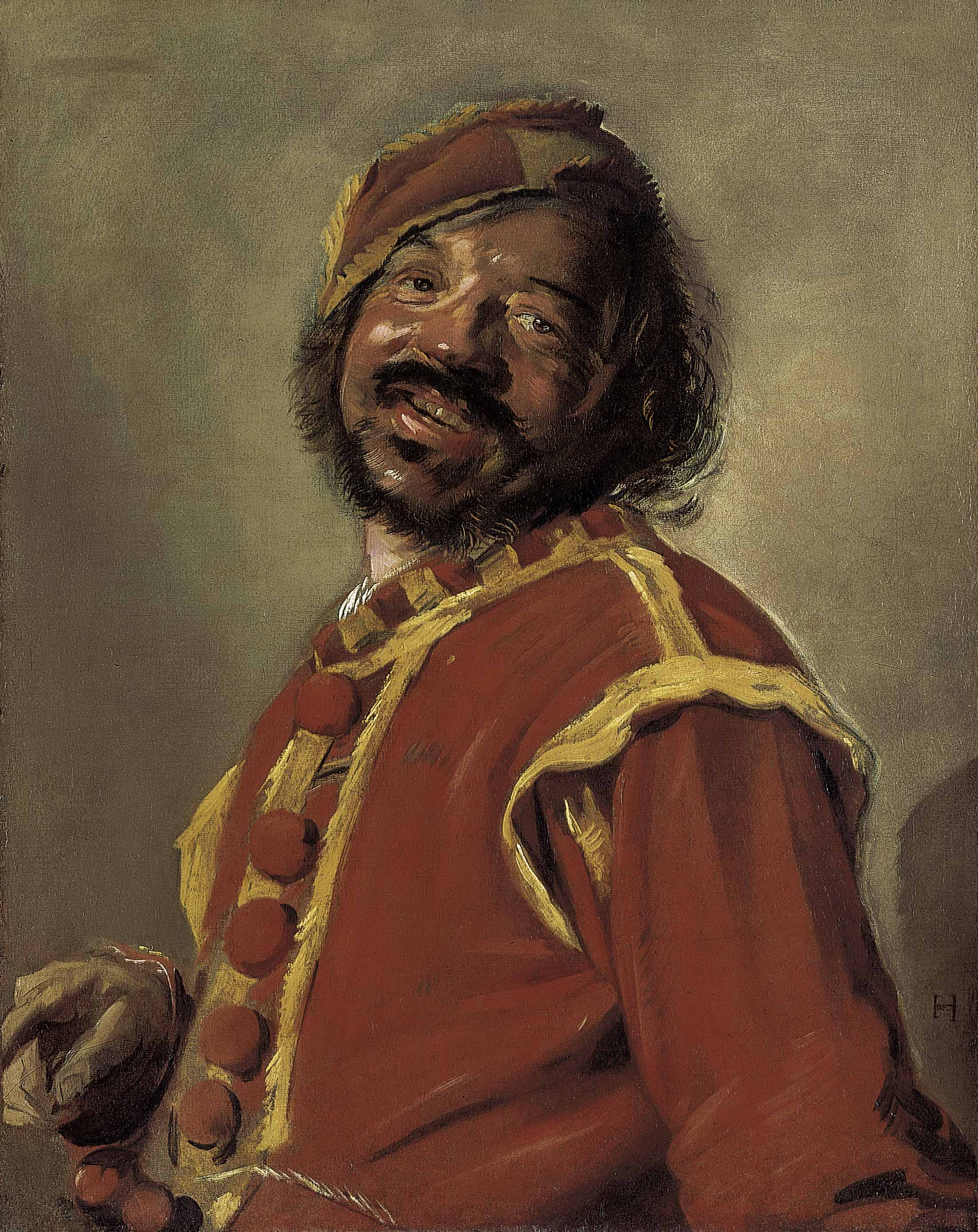
The Mulatto, 1627

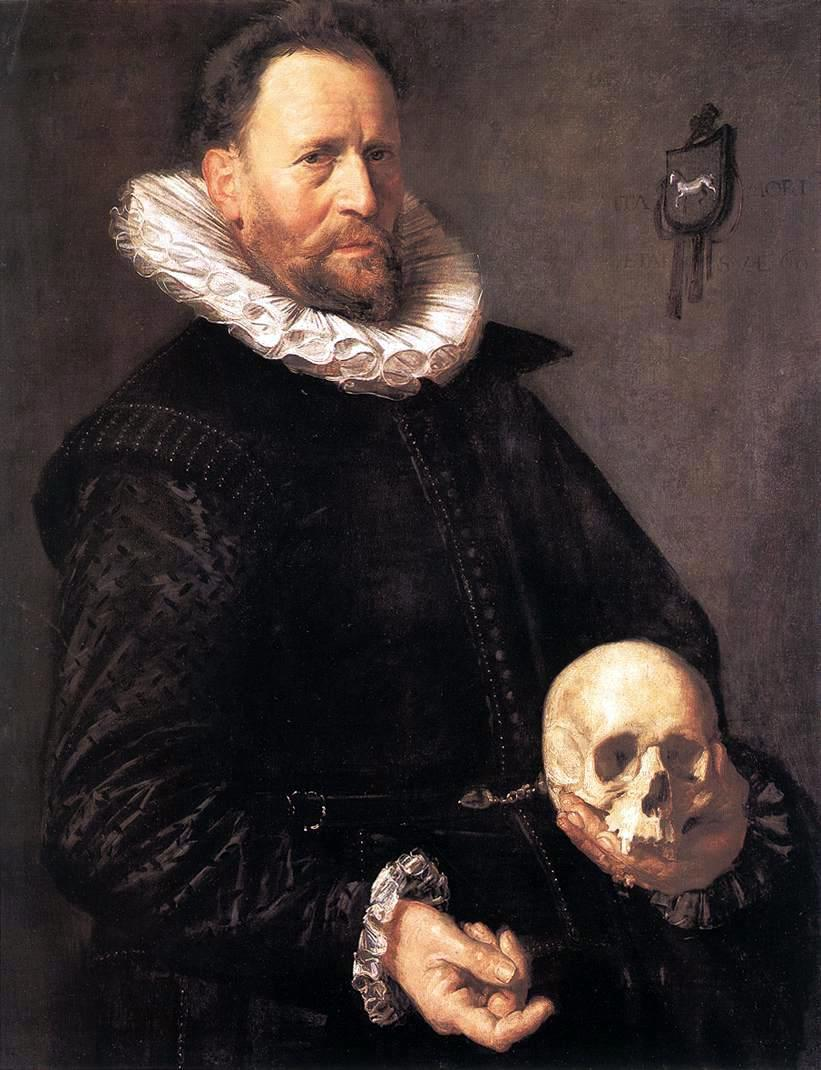
Portrait of a Man Holding a Skull, c. 1612–1614, Barber Institute, Birmingham

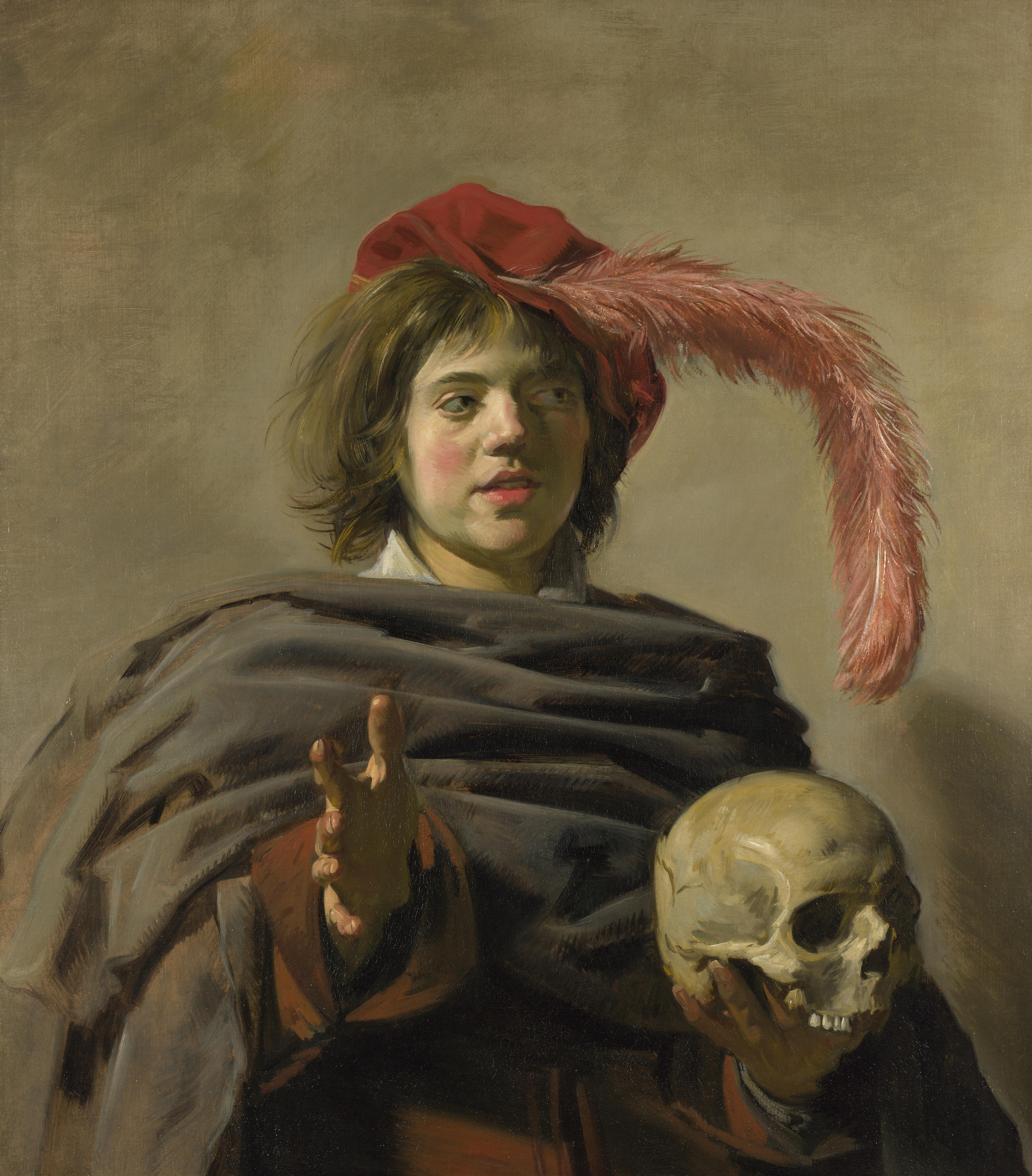
Young Man with a Skull, c. 1626–1628, National Gallery, London

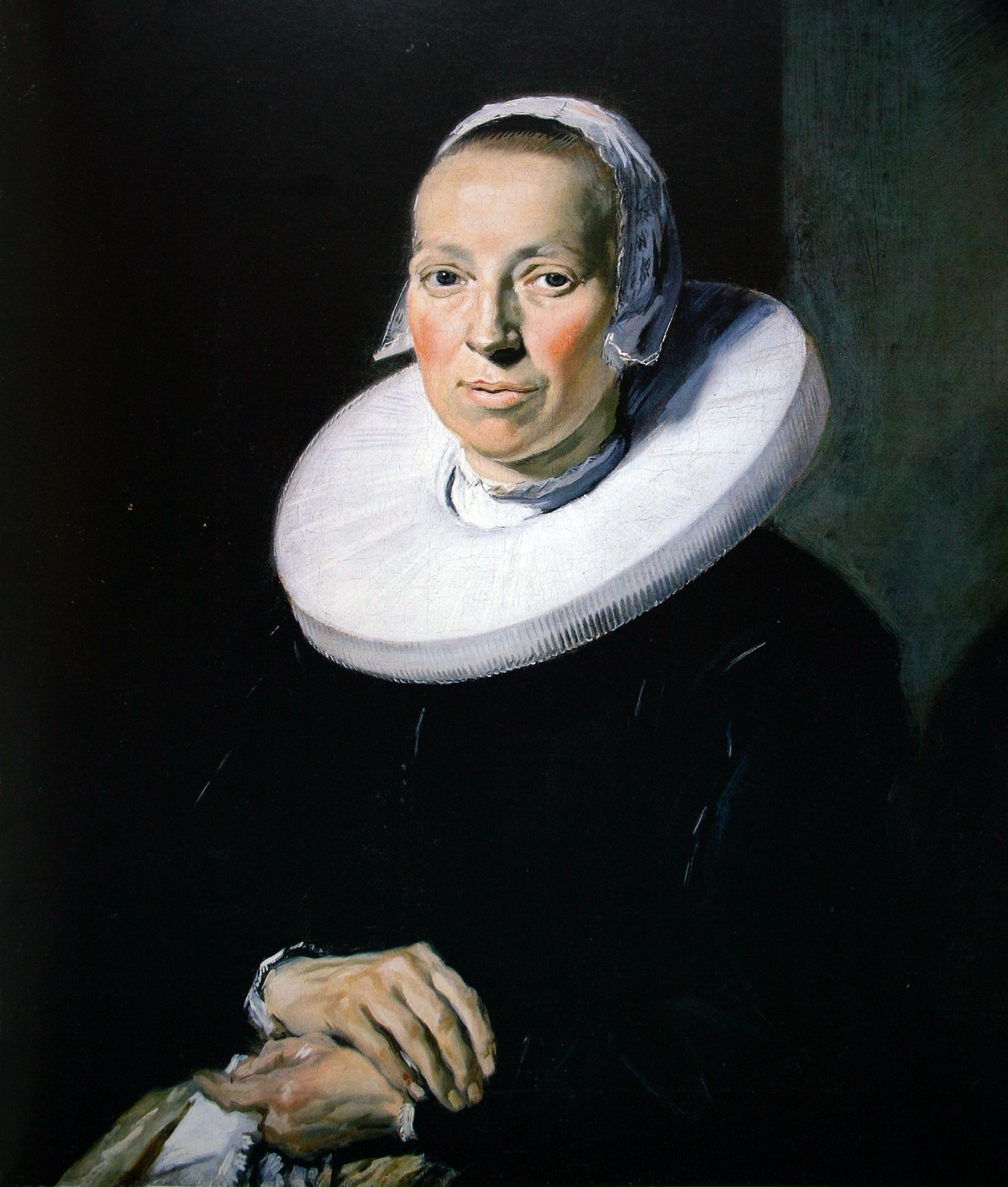
Portrait of a Woman, 1644

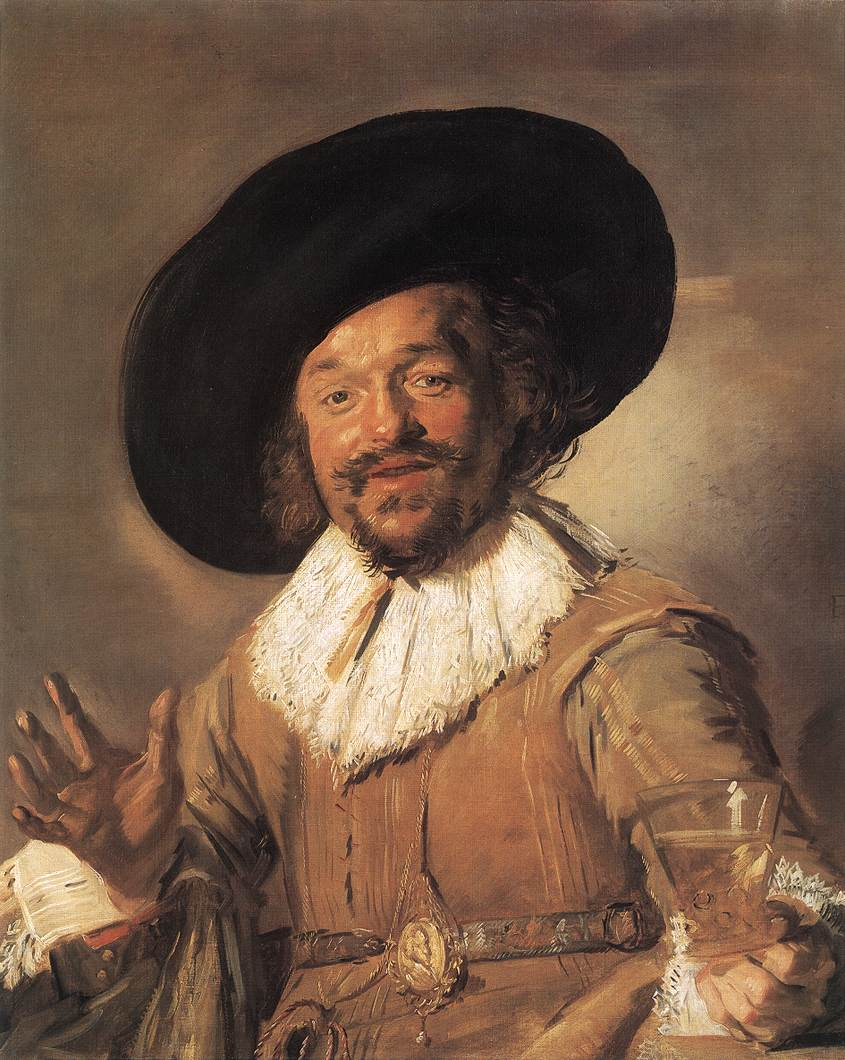
The Merry Drinker, c. 1628–1630

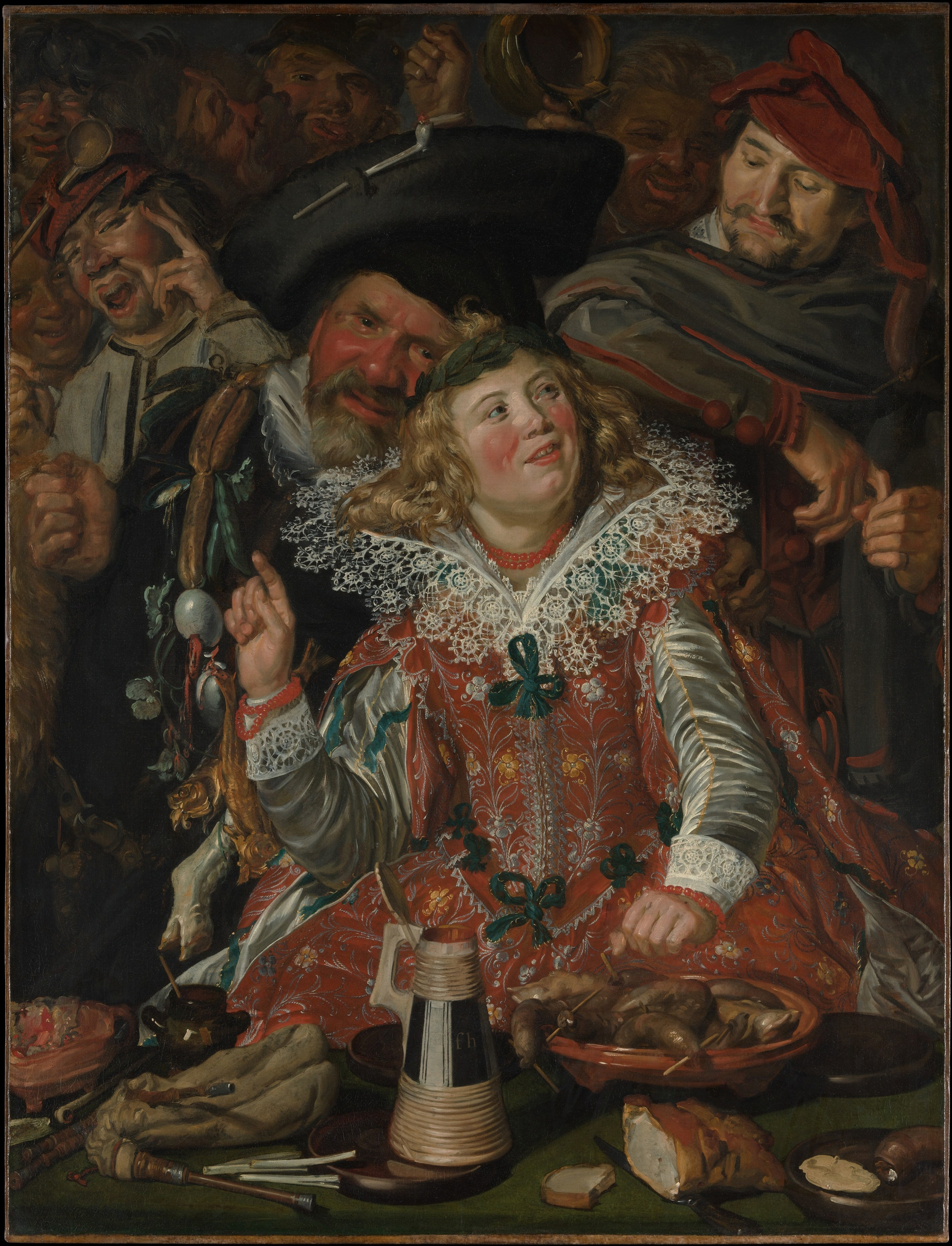
Shrovetide Revellers, c. 1615

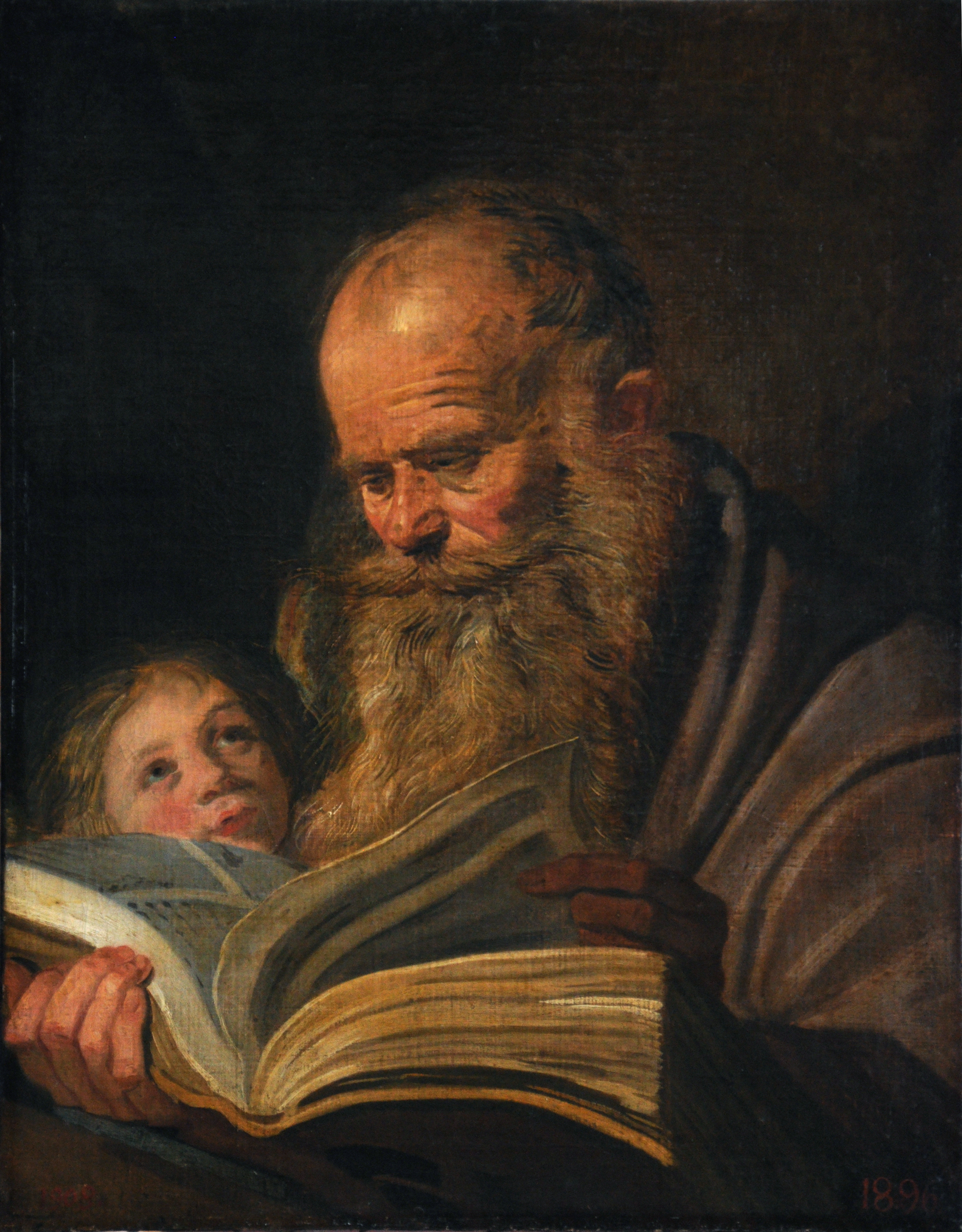
St Matthew, c. 1625

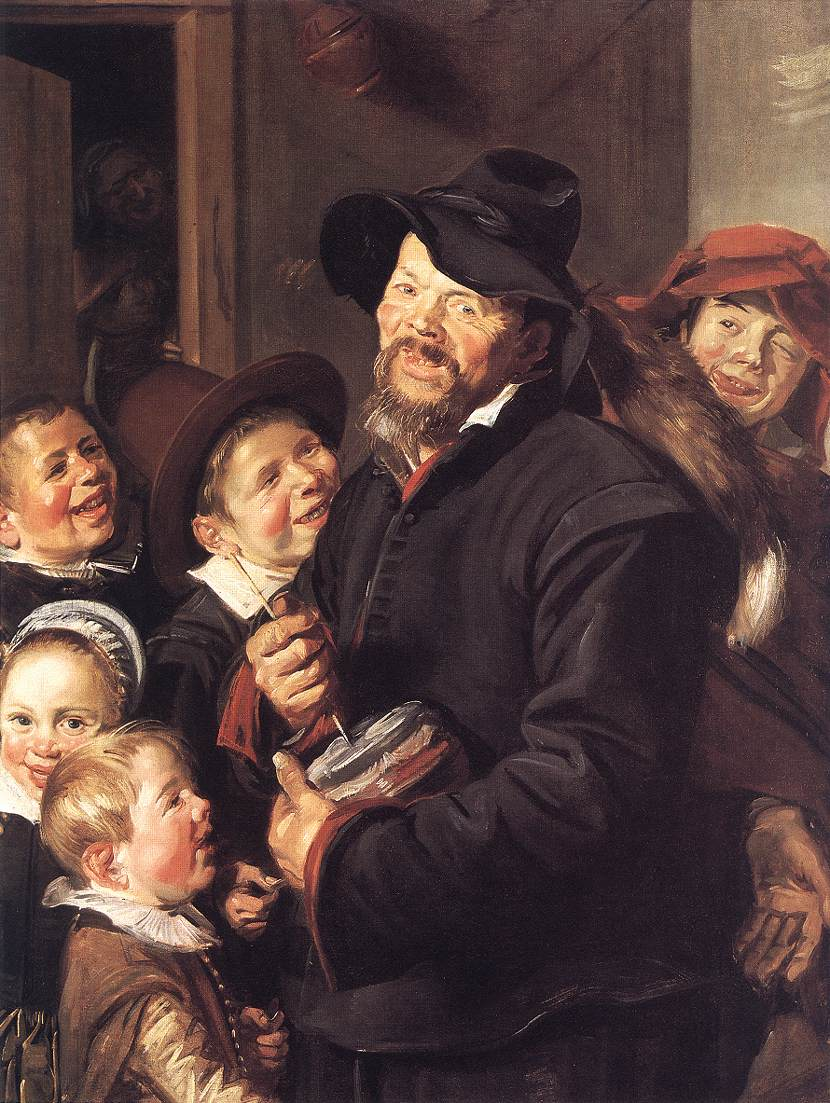
The Rommelpot Player, c. 1618–1622

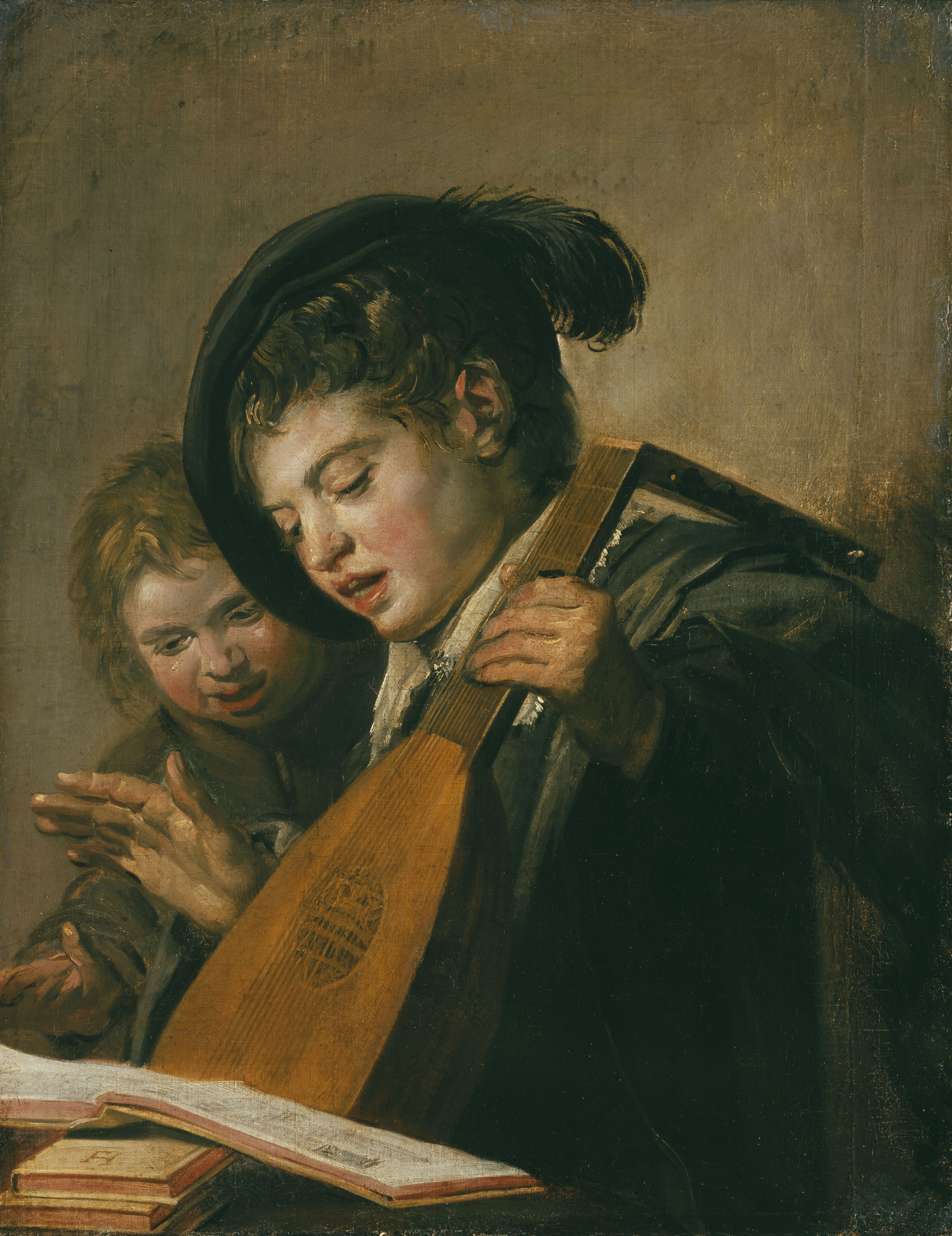
Two Singing Boys with a Lute and a Music Book, c. 1625

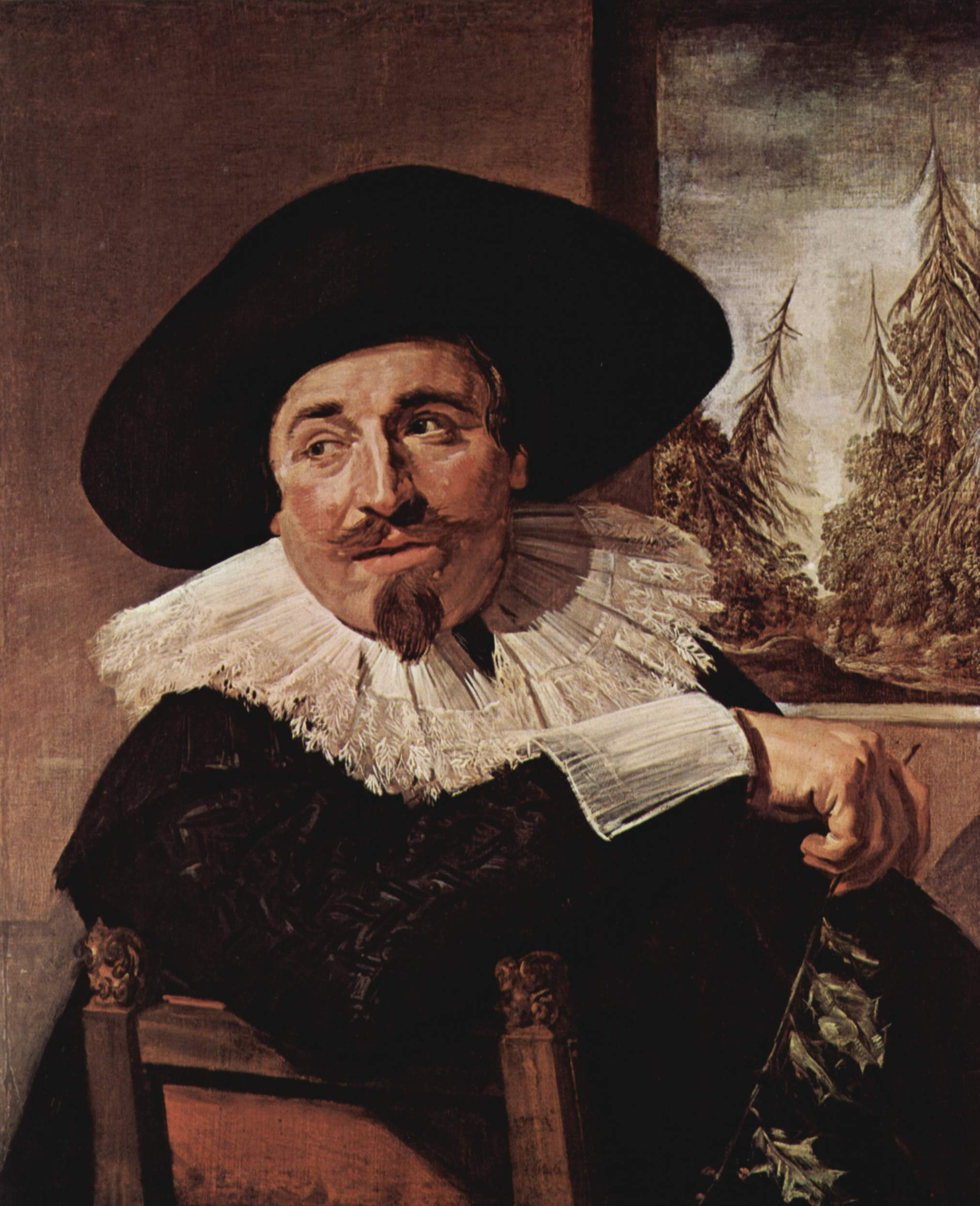
Portrait of Isaak Abrahamsz. Massa, 1626

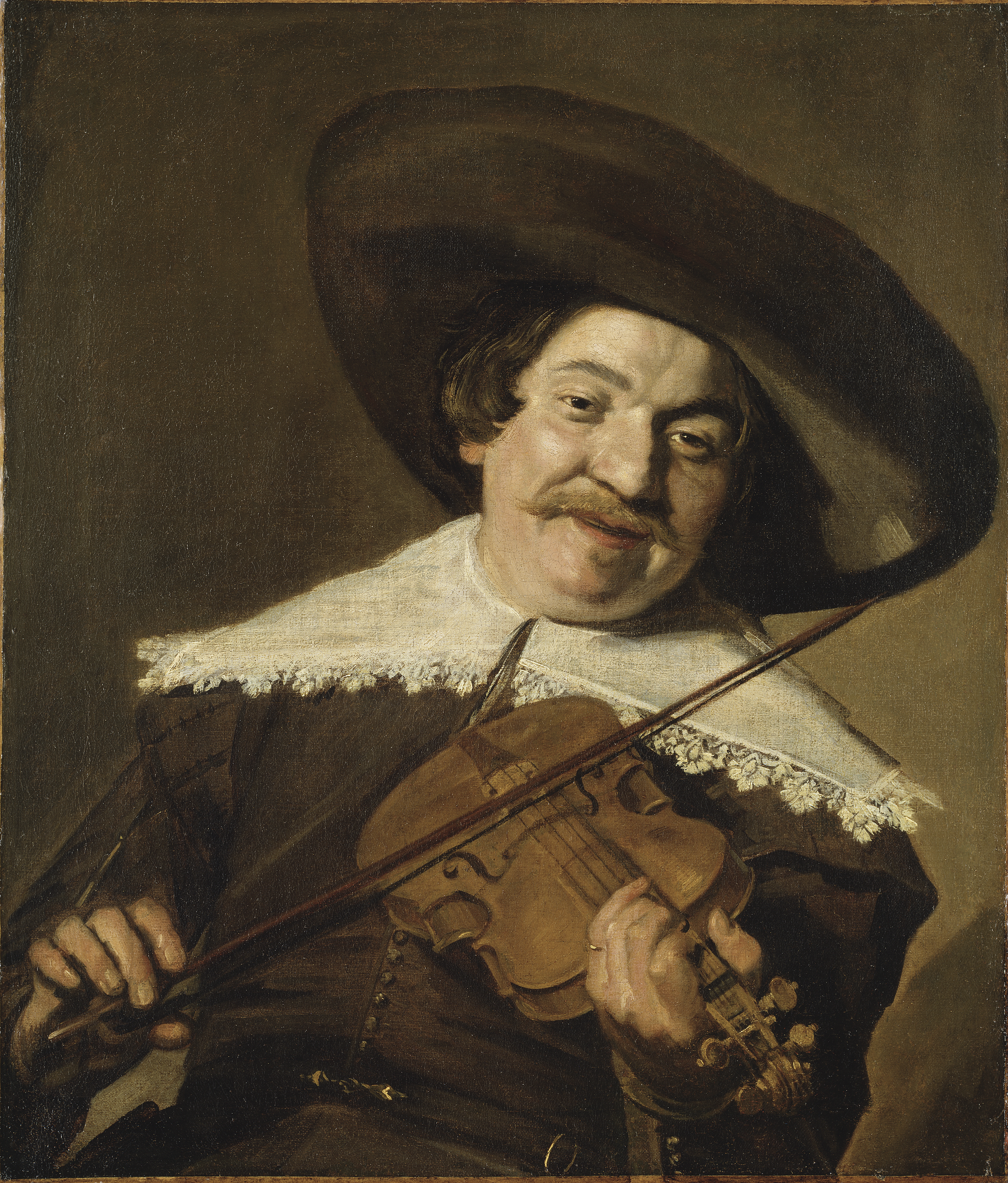
Daniel van Aken

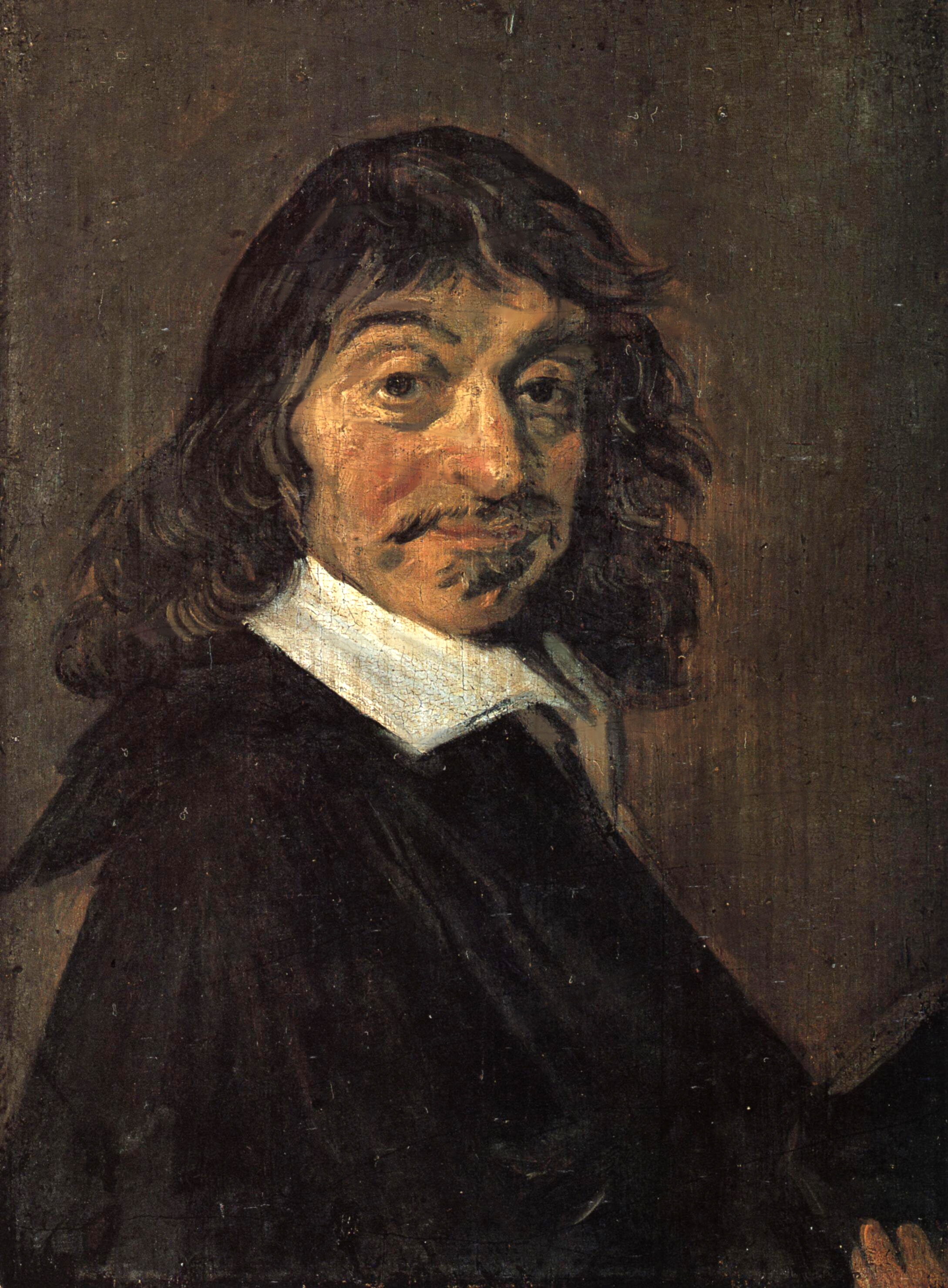
Portrait of René Descartes, c. 1649

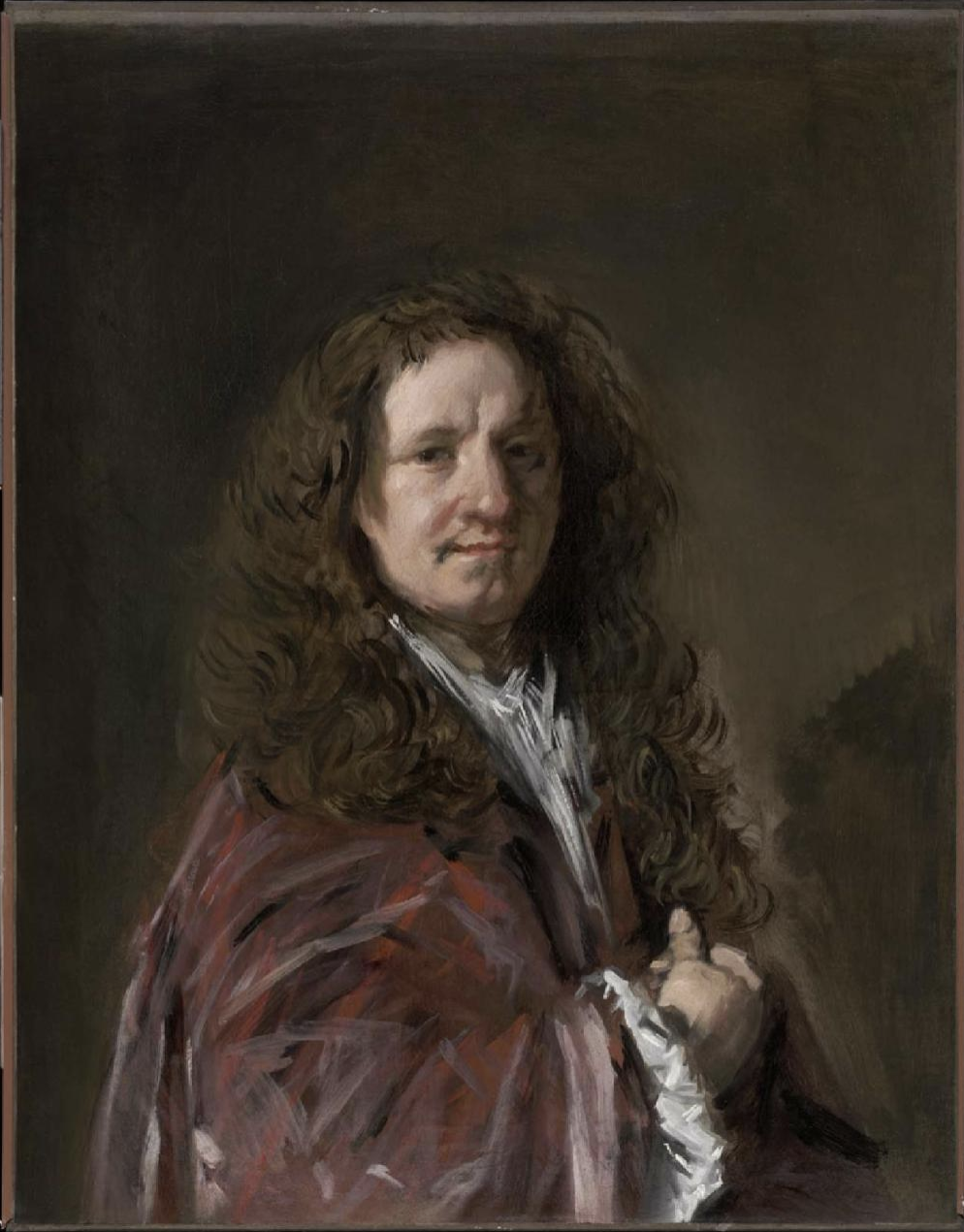
Portrait of a Man (about 1665), Museum of Fine Arts, Boston (66.1054)

External videos
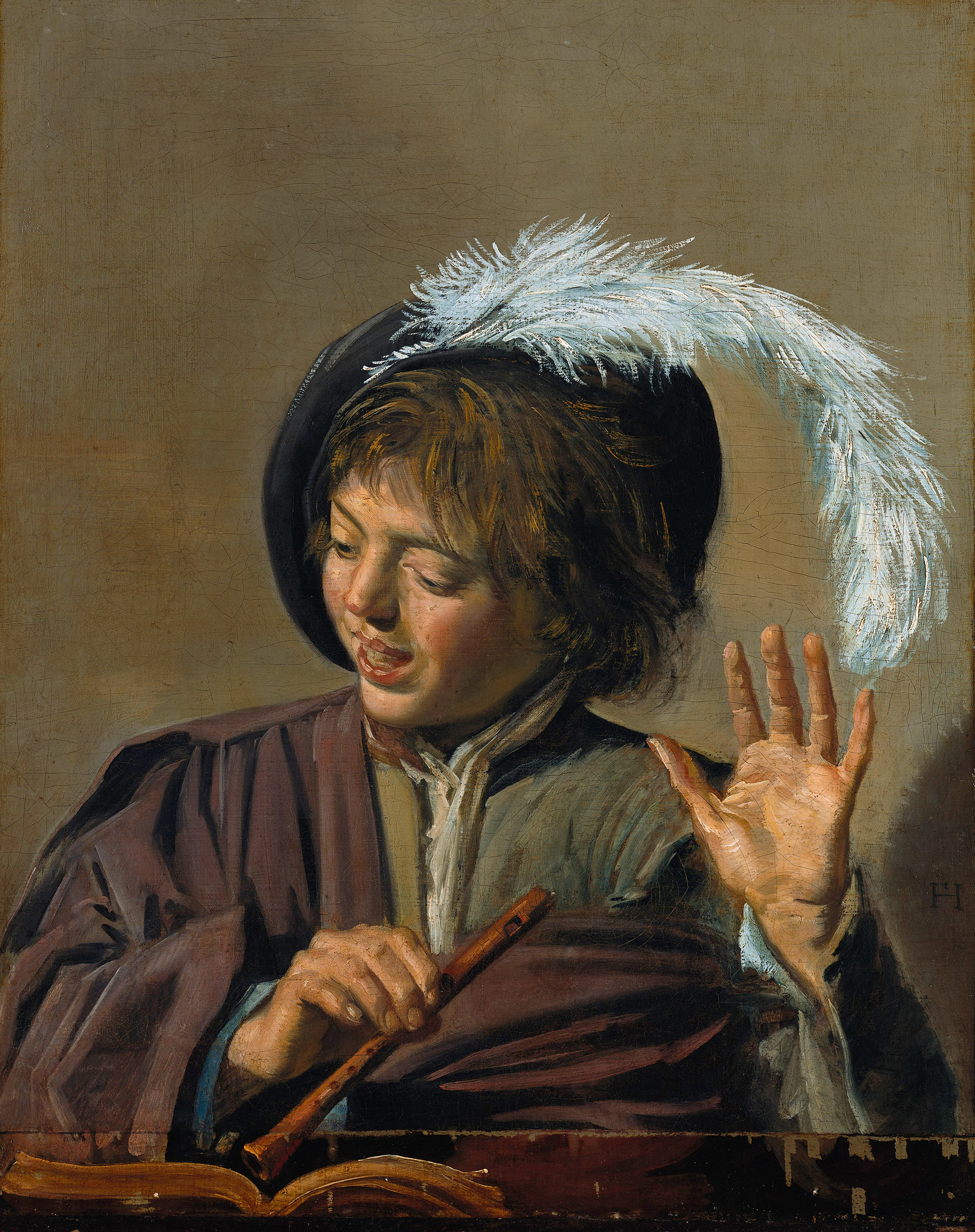
- Hals's Singing Boy with Flute, Smarthistory
- Hals's Malle Babbe, Smarthistory

== Public collections (selection) ==
- Frans Hals Museum, Haarlem
- Frick Collection, New York City
- Koninklijk Museum voor Schone Kunsten Antwerpen
- Louvre, Paris
- Mauritshuis, The Hague
- Metropolitan Museum of Art, New York
- Gemäldegalerie, Berlin
- Museum Boijmans Van Beuningen, Rotterdam
- Museum of Fine Arts, Boston
- Rijksmuseum Amsterdam.
- Kenwood House
- Wallace Collection, London

== See also ==
- List of paintings by Frans Hals
- Han van Meegeren
