= Portrait of a Woman Holding a Fan (Hals; Stuttgart) =

Painting by Frans Hals

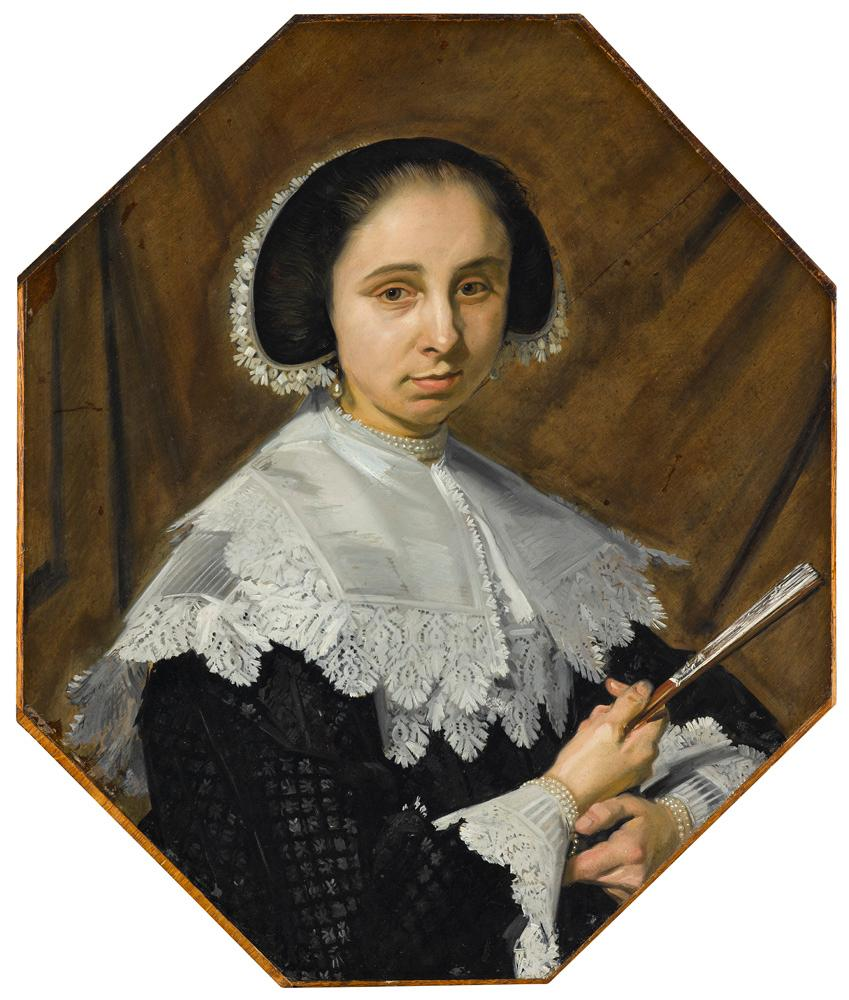
- Artists: Frans Hals, lived from (probably) late 1582 to 26 August 1666
- Year: About 1633 to 1637
- Catalogue: Cornelis Hofstede de Groot, Catalogue Raisonné Volume III, 1910: no. 399
- Medium: Oil colours on an octagonal oak panel
- Subject: Head and upper body of a woman turned three-quarters right; in her right hand a closed fan
- Dimensions: 67.5 cm × 57 cm (26.6 in × 22 in)
- Location: Staatsgalerie, Stuttgart, Germany
- Accession: 2499

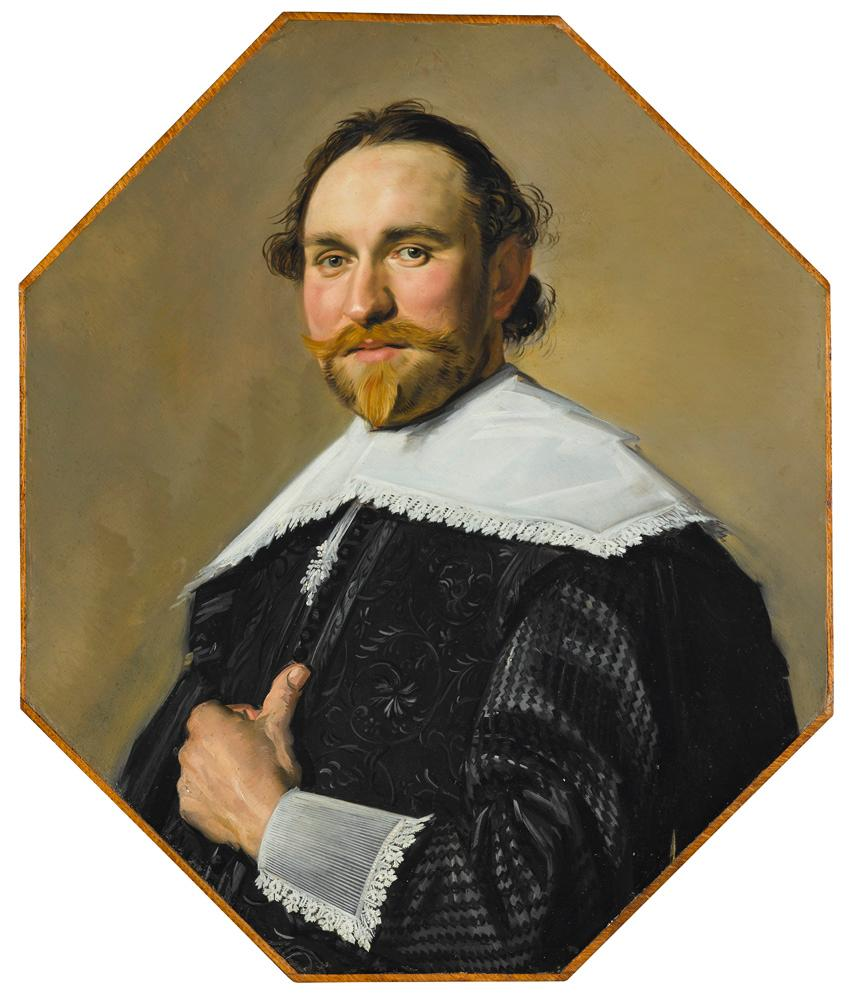
Portrait of a Man, Hals's pendant to Portrait of a Woman Holding a Fan.

Portrait of a Woman Holding a Fan is a name given to an untitled octagonal painting by Frans Hals that is in the permanent collection at the Stuttgart Staatsgalerie. Hals was a male 17th-century Dutch master who specialised in portraits and other pictures of people. This painting depicts a woman who is looking at the artist. She holds her hands one above the other at her breast; in her right she has a closed fan that gleams silver. She wears a black gown or jacket, a big white flat collar and cuffs with much lace, and many pearls, in the mid-1630s fashion for Dutch women of means. The Portrait of a Woman Holding a Fan is not signed or dated, but Hals probably painted it at Haarlem in 1635, give or take a year or two. The woman's name is not now known. Hals painted a similarly sized octagonal pendant to this picture, a portrait of a man, which also hangs at the Staatsgalerie. Such pendant portraits often depict a husband and wife, or a husband and wife to be.

== Description; composition ==
The Portrait of a Woman Holding a Fan is a borststuk, the Dutch term in Hals's time for a "head-and-upper-body painting of a person". Hals painted this portrait in oil colours on an octagonal oak panel, 67.5 cm high by 57 cm wide. (1633–1637 is relatively late for a painting on panel. By the 1630s, canvas was already the more usual support in Holland.) The panel on which the woman's portrait is painted is a single piece of oak. The diagonal grain is visible, it runs from lower left towards upper right in the picture, with a pronounced fault in the wood visible from near the woman's chin to the top-right diagonal edge of the panel.

The woman is positioned well forward in her picture; at least as far forward, if not more so, than the man in the pendant. John Berger and his co-authors proposed that someone looking at an oil painting assumes that a person depicted in the near foreground (like the woman holding the fan in this case) is close enough to touch and, by implication, is familiar. More typically in a pair of 17th-century Dutch pendant portraits, the man appears further forward in his compositional space than the woman does in hers. (Illustrations of examples can be found in the Wikipedia collection of marriage pendant portraits by Frans Hals.) In other words, usually the woman is relatively "withdrawn" or "distant" in her portrait, while the man is literally the more forward of the pair.

The light falls on the sitter as if from a window to her left (from the artist's perspective), as is generally the case in Hals's portraits.

From the artist's point of view, the woman's body faces three-quarters right; her face is turned more towards the artist than is her torso, and her ambiguous gaze directly engages with, and inquisitively observes, the artist.

She holds her hands one above the other at her breast. They are not stereotypically delicate like the hands of a fine "vandyckian" lady posing—rather, they are noticeably bony. In her right hand she holds a closed fan that gleams silver. She does not hold it lightly or elegantly as if it were merely a decorative prop to afford her hands some insignificant distraction, but quite firmly, as though it were an implement she might soon use.

Her hair is dark, but greying at the top of her forehead. It is combed back smooth and nearly straight except where recalcitrant curls escape at her left.

Some of the distinct lines in the Portrait of a Woman Holding a Fan run parallel to the diagonal edges of the octagonal panel—for instance the woman's right shoulder, her forearms, and her fan. These quite close harmonies lend the composition a stability that is interrupted by the apparent asymmetry of the woman's face, which is thus emphasised.

The background in the Portrait of a Woman Holding a Fan is a brown drape. It is reminiscent of the characteristic drapery in full-length portraits of (ostensibly) high-status subjects such as Willem van Heythuysen. It does not match the featureless, greyish ochre background of the pendant man's portrait, which is less dark. The difference between the backgrounds, as well as the fact that the woman's portrait hangs to the left of the man's (see the section titled The way the woman faces below), suggest that Hals might not have painted the two pictures at the same time under the same commission, while the size and shape of the two panels suggest they were intended to make a pair, as may the fact that both subjects are dressed in black with a white collar and cuffs. (That combination of colours was however typical for middle-class women and men in Haarlem at that time.)

The Portrait of a Woman Holding a Fan shows not quite enough of her upper body to tell what kind of black garment she is wearing. For further discussion of what the woman wears, see the section titled Her clothes, jewellery, and married status in this article.

Both the Portrait of a Woman Holding a Fan and its pendant Portrait of a Man currently (2026) hang in rectangular frames despite the paintings' octagonal shape.

Near the middle of the lace border hanging from the collar in the Portrait of a Woman Holding a Fan is a light but noticeable smudge of white paint, uncorrected, perhaps from a rag. The imprint of woven threads is discernible in the mark.

== The way the woman faces ==
By longstanding convention, his-and-hers pendant portraits of a married or soon-to-be-married couple were hung with the man's picture to the left of the woman's, typically with each figure turned half-way between facing the artist and facing their companion figure.

The Portrait of a Woman Holding a Fan and the Portrait of a Man are the only known pendant pair by Hals in which the woman's portrait hangs to the left of the man's. Because the Portrait of a Woman Holding a Fan hangs to the left of its pendant, the woman's body faces somewhat to the right (as seen from the artist's position) to orient her appropriately towards the male portrait. Claus Grimm, writing for the RKD institute in The Hague, suggests Hals might have painted both subjects "facing the wrong way" because one or other of them had a facial defect, which need not be shown in the arrangement chosen. (See the section titled Her clothes, jewellery, and married status, below, for more about how the two portraits relate to one another.)

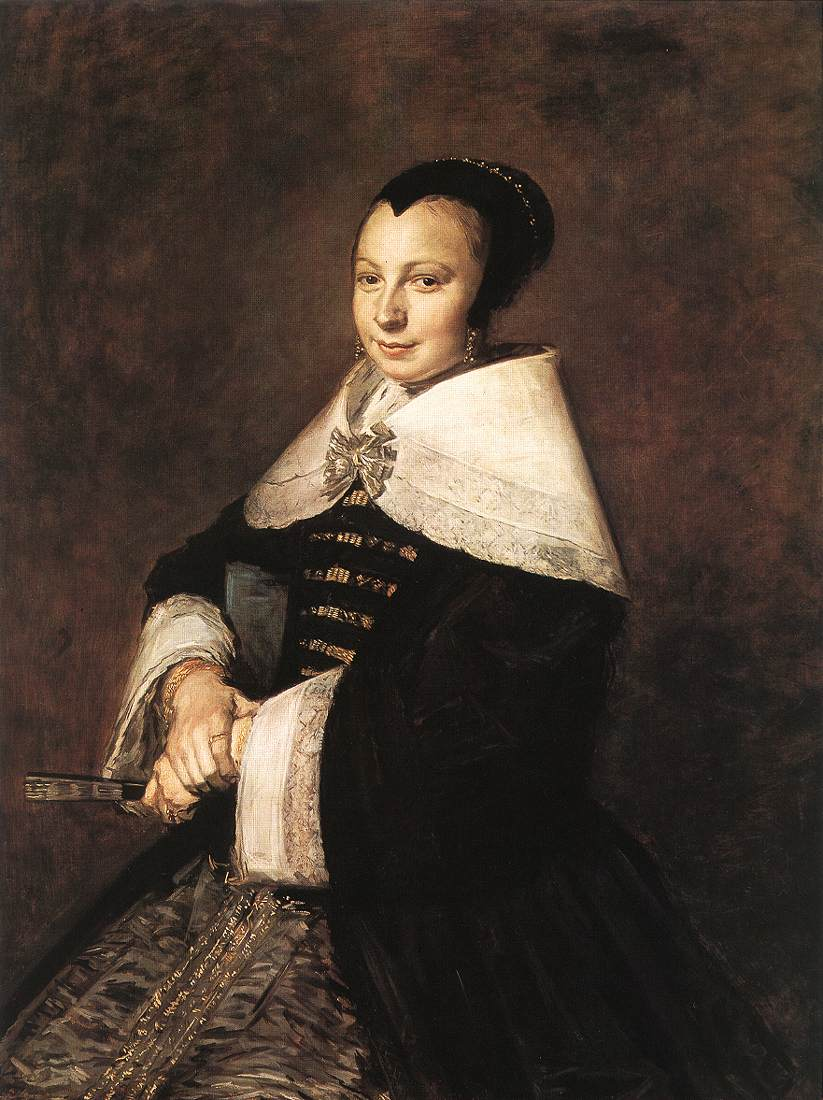
To compare: a portrait from about 1649, also by Hals, of a married woman holding a fan. The sitter is set well back from the plane of the picture; her body is partly oriented towards the pendant man's portrait, which hangs, conventionally, to the left of hers. The wedding ring on her right forefinger is prominent. (Taft, Cincinnati, Ohio)

There was an inverse expectation in respect of couples who were not married to one another: in the background on the right of Hals's Marriage Portrait of Isaac Massa and Beatrix van der Laen there are two courting couples (that is to say, couples who are not married) strolling in a garden of love. The woman in each of these couples walks at the left of her male companion from the artist's perspective, attesting that they are not married to one another. On the left of the picture, Massa himself sits to the left of his wife Beatrix van der Laen, as the convention expects for a married couple. Van der Laen wears a wedding ring on her right forefinger, and a stomacher. Both the ring and the stomacher indicate her status as a married woman.

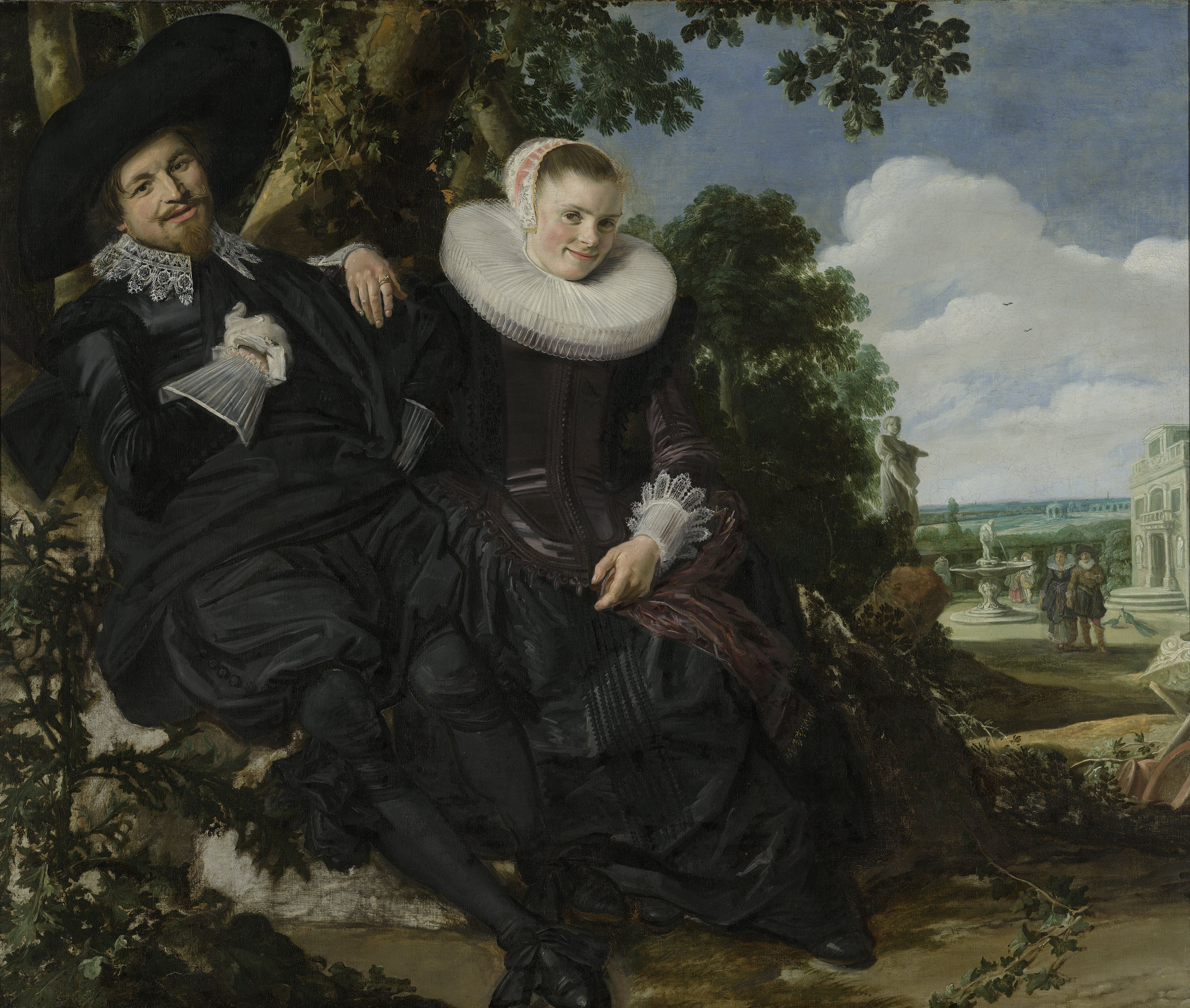
Hals's Marriage Portrait of Isaac Massa and Beatrix van der Laen shows in the left foreground a married couple, with the man at the woman's left as seen by the artist, and in the right background two unmarried couples, each with the woman at the man's left from the artist's point of view.

Portrait of a Woman Holding a Fan and its pendant Portrait of a Man (also at the Stuttgart Staatsgalerie). Pendant portraits of a married couple would conventionally hang with (from the artist's point of view) the man on the left, facing three-quarters right—so in terms of that convention, either this couple are "the wrong way round" and each consequently "faces the wrong way"—or else they are not married. The two people are not interacting with one another, but she interacts with Hals in the way she looks at him. Consequently she seems also to engage with us viewers as we look at the painting.

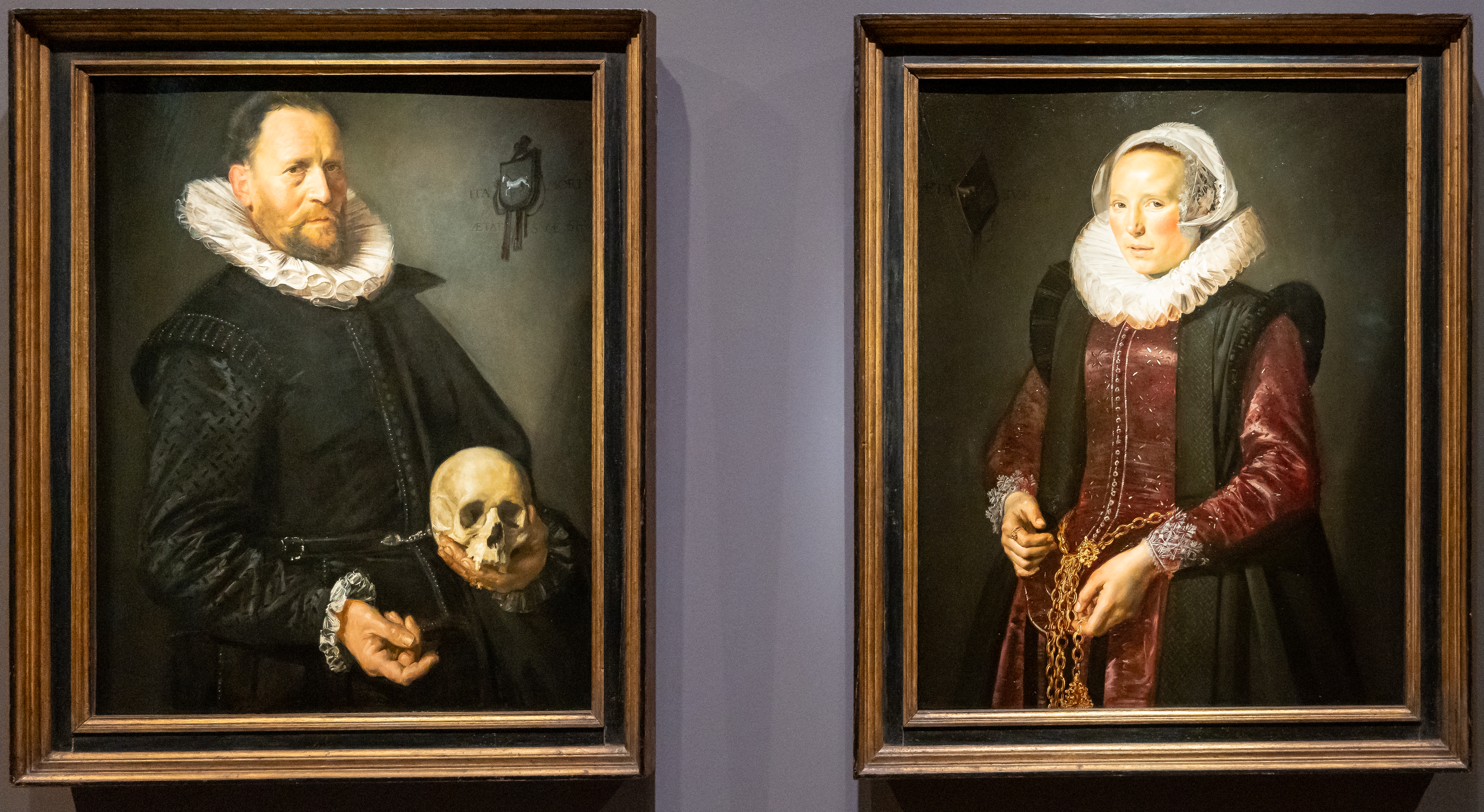
For comparison, two earlier works by Hals: Portrait of a Man Holding a Skull and its pendant Portrait of a Woman Standing. They hang as the convention would require for a married couple. The business going on with the gold chain, the skull, and the hands makes one whole picture out of the two individual portraits.

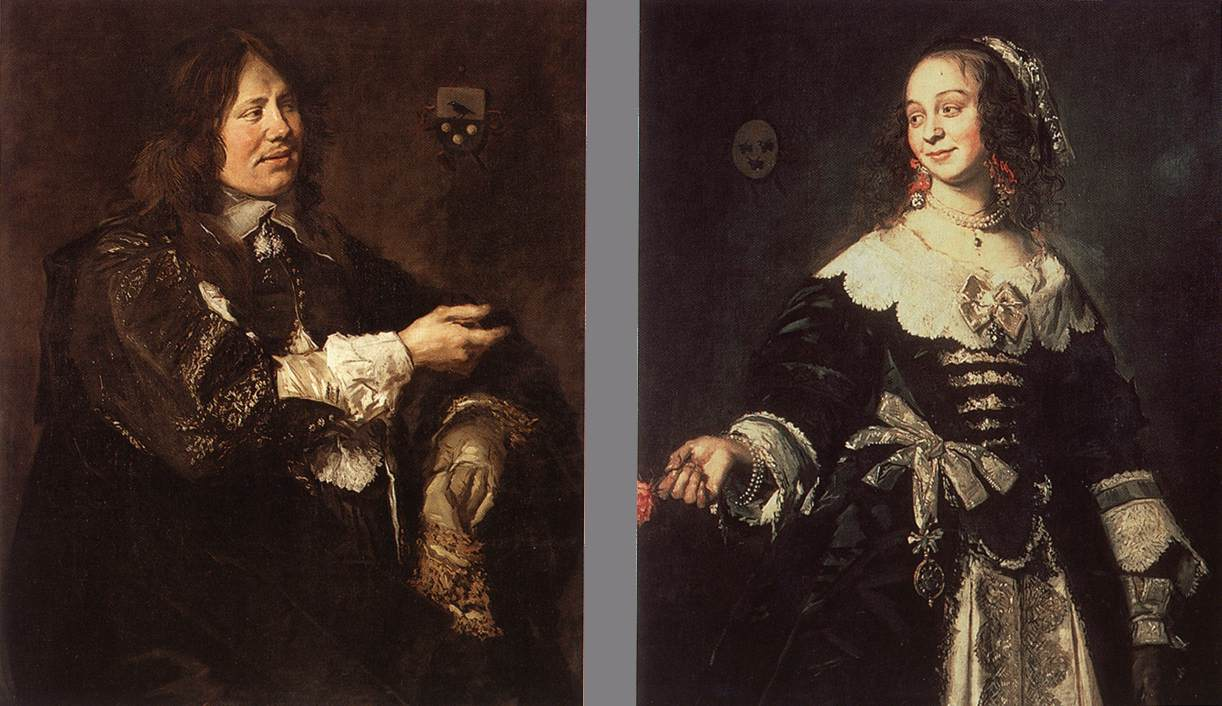
Two later pendant portraits by Hals: Stephanus Geraerdts and Isabella Coymans. They also hang in accordance with the convention for a married couple, though in some other respects (such as her stance) they are quite unconventional. The two people do, however, interact with one another.

The convention concerning the relative positions in which man-and-wife pendant portraits should hang had its origin in mediæval shields: if a woman's arms were allied with those of a man in his shield, his arms were positioned dexter—that is, on the ("dominant") right, from his own perspective (so, not from the artist's perspective) as he carried the shield.

== Her gaze ==
Laura Cumming writes of Hals's "gift for the double response, for the sustained connection between sitter and viewer that makes it seem as if they are equally fascinated to see you." Cumming's ambiguity (the viewer could refer to us viewing the painting or to Hals viewing the sitter; they and equally could refer to the sitter or to the sitter and Hals) captures an ambiguity in many of Hals's paintings of people: he paints moments when he forms a view of his subjects forming a view of him, so his subjects, including the sitter in the Portrait of a Woman Holding a Fan, appear to be forming a view of us looking at the painting of them.

The angle and apparent asymmetry of the face in the Portrait of a Woman Holding a Fan suggest that the woman could be looking up at Hals from an imaginary painting or drawing she herself is making of him (perhaps with her fan as a proxy for a brush or pencil). The woman's expression conveys inquisitiveness rather than any conventionally feminine deference or passivity. She appears calm, with a discerning common sense and mild scepticism which the hint of little smile does not mask—as though she and the artist were sharing a moment of visual repartee.

== Her clothes, jewellery, and married status ==
The subject of the Portrait of a Woman Holding a Fan wears a black gown (or perhaps a jacket) with sleeves apparently in voided velvet or a two-tone damask weave. The sleeves are decorated with little squares arranged in a straight pattern, each containing a grey plant or animal motif. (They are not all the same.) Over the black garment she wears a wide falling collar of two layers in white linen batiste. Both layers are abundantly bordered with large white bobbin-lace scallops. She also wears folded-back pouvretten (cuffs) that match the collar. At the back of her head she wears a simple boogjesmuts ("cap" is the term used in the English version of Hofstede de Groot's Catalogue Raisonné). It shows all the hair at the front half of her head, combed back and neatly tucked in. The cap is decorated with a narrow lace border around the front which matches the trim of her collar.

The woman wears large pearl drop-earrings, a three-string pearl choker, and at either wrist a three-string pearl bracelet.

Her attire was fashionable at the time Hals painted the portrait. Compare, for instance, his Portrait of a Woman from the mid-1630s at the Gemäldegalerie in Berlin, in which the sitter is similarly dressed.

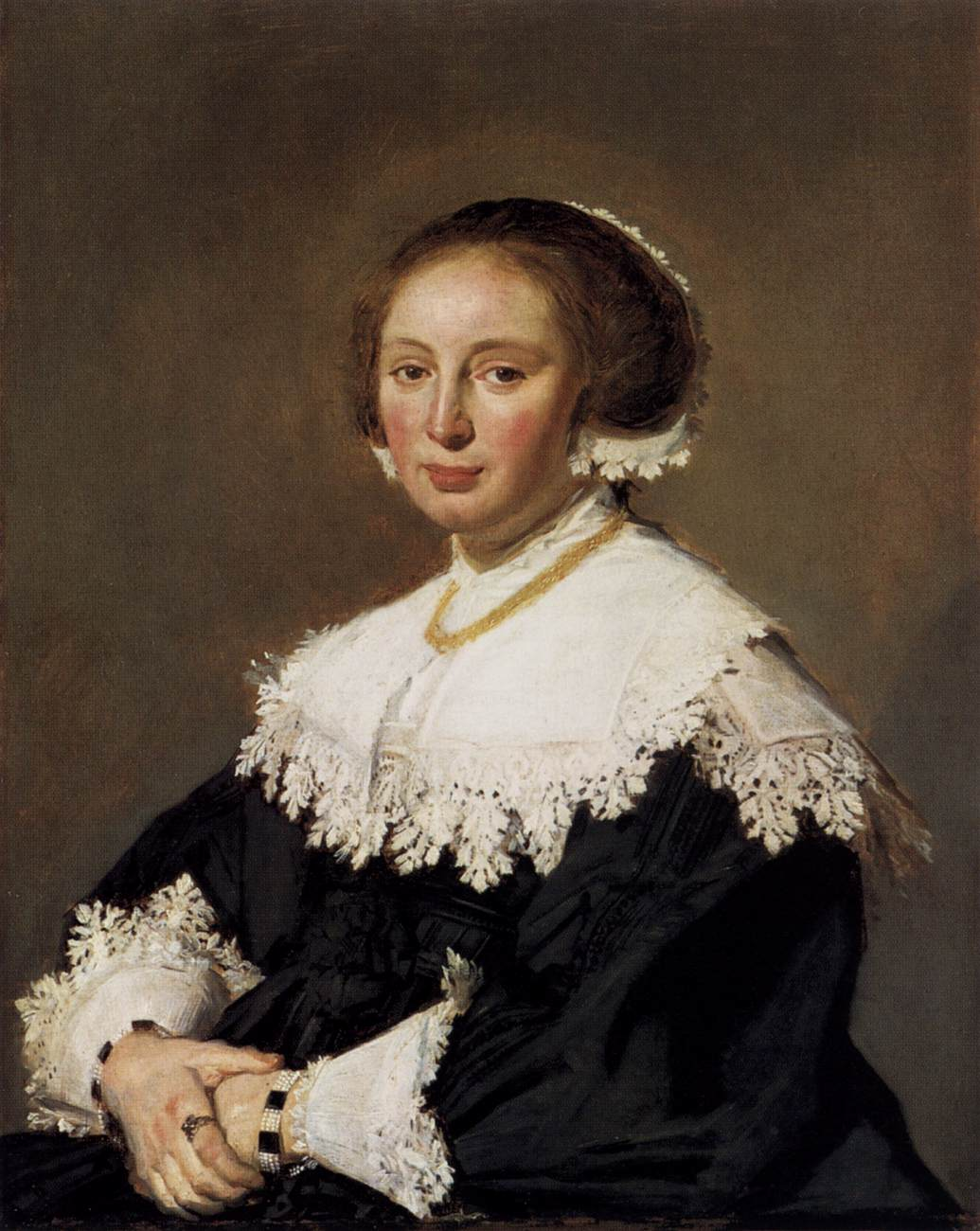
The fashion of the time: a portrait by Hals of a similarly dressed woman, also from the mid-1630s, at the Berlin Gemäldegalerie. She displays her wedding ring prominently and faces the conventional way for a married woman in a pair of pendant portraits.

In the Dutch Republic at Hals's time, the typical commissioned portrait of a married woman would prominently show one or more standard attributes to indicate her married status. These might include: a stomacher; a pair of bridal gloves (held, not worn); and a wedding ring on the fourth finger (Roman Catholic) or the forefinger (Protestant)—or both. The Portrait of a Woman Holding a Fan shows none of these typical married-woman attributes.

While the left-facing stance was not unusual in the portrait of a man when the subject was a bachelor (sometimes loudly dressed like the Laughing Cavalier), it was uncommon for the man in a pendant pair to be shown facing that way.

There is little in either the Portrait of a Woman Holding a Fan or its pendant Portrait of a Man to suggest that either subject is aware of the other's presence in the adjacent picture. Neither portrait was necessarily painted while their two subjects were married: for example, in the 20th century Seymour Slive ventured that this pair of paintings hangs anomalously because the man had his own portrait made while he was still a bachelor, and later commissioned the Portrait of a Woman Holding a Fan as a pendant to it—which assumes a superordinate role for the man in that aspect of their relationship. Slive does not exclude other explanations for the unorthodox relations between the two portraits in this pair and cautions that the place women held in 17th-century Dutch society was more important than it had been in earlier times. In the absence of evidence to the contrary, the subject of the Portrait of a Woman Holding a Fan might just as well have commissioned her own portrait as a single woman of independent means.

=== Women's place in society ===
"In the 17th century, women in the Dutch Republic had a relatively high degree of independence, both inside and outside the home." Dutch towns in particular are widely thought to have offered women exceptional freedom. Foreign visitors to the Dutch Republic remarked on the visibility of women in business and public life. For significant periods in the 17th century, a substantial proportion of Dutch men were away at sea or at war (many never to return), which would have left some women space to gain more prominence and independence than was then usual in other Western cultures. Women could establish their own businesses with capital from an inheritance or from relatives. According to one Dutch farce from 1692, the mistress of a household might even reward her maid's discretion so generously that the maid could set herself up in business.

Prof. Danielle van den Heuvel writes that there were fewer obstacles to women's making their own living in the trades regulated by guilds (or obstacles were less stringently applied) in Haarlem than elsewhere in the Dutch Republic.

== Painting style and technique ==
Painter and art theoretician Karel van Mander, the master under whom Hals learnt his trade, taught a distinction between the "rough" (rouw in the Dutch of his time) and the "smooth" or "neat" (net ) styles of painting. He advised apprentices and beginners to learn to paint in the smooth style before attempting the rough, because the rough was more difficult. Striking aspects of the smooth style which contrast with the rough alternative include painstaking attention to every detail and the absence of plainly visible brushwork.

The smooth or neat style: a portrait from around 1640 of a now unidentified Haarlem lady by Verspronck, with prominent wedding ring and bridal gloves. Every detail is rendered painstakingly, but no brushwork is obviously visible. Ashmolean Museum, Oxford

Hals's genre paintings of interesting individuals made for the open market (such as his Malle Babbe, which is contemporary with the Portrait of a Woman Holding a Fan) tended to become less smooth and more rough over the period during which he painted them. He could offer his portrait clients a choice, or a combination, of smooth and rough styles: the choice was in principle theirs, not his, but they knew his reputation for virtuoso rough work, and his commissioned portraits also tended to become more rough in style once that reputation was established. His commissioned portraits of women tend to have more smooth parts than do his commissioned portraits of men.

There is little difference between Hals's Portrait of a Woman Holding a Fan and its pendant Portrait of a Man in terms of his smooth and rough handling of the paint. Nowhere in the Portrait of a Woman Holding a Fan does Hals work in fully blended smooth mode, but some passages are much less rough than others. In the careful modelling of the woman's face and the pleated sections of her collar and cuffs, for instance, the brushwork is not obvious except on quite close inspection. On the other hand, the plain part of her collar is rendered in largely unblended brushstrokes, and there are other parts of the painting again which are so rough in style that they hardly make sense if viewed from too near. These include: a long white brushstroke representing a strip of the batiste collar which catches the light; a field of grey hatch marks for the inside of her collar, out of the light at the far left of the painting; and a jumble of white zigzags at the bottom representing part of a silk cuff border that does not hang free. Each resolves satisfactorily, as a relatively unimportant part of the overall work, when seen from a normal viewing distance.

The fan looks more significant. What is perceived from a normal viewing distance is a lively gleam from a silver fan rather than a silver fan that happens to catch the light. It is rendered in quite a rough style as a pattern of white brushstrokes. Observers from Hals's own time, as well as more recent technical examinations of his work, tell us he 'added' liveliness to his subjects at the end of his process. Energetic finishing flourishes might be added wet-in-wet. According to Arnold Houbraken, Hals called such added liveliness "het kennelyke van den meester"—the master's distinctive touch.

== Attribution; provenance ==
The Portrait of a Woman Holding a Fan is not signed, nor (as far as is known) was it documented in its own age, but its attribution to Frans Hals is not in doubt.

Among the authors of catalogues raisonnés who have attributed the Portrait of a Woman Holding a Fan to Hals are:

- Cornelis Hofstede de Groot, 1910, no. 399
- Wilhelm Valentiner, 1923, p. 104
- Seymour Slive, 1974, no. 98
- Claus Grimm, 1989, no. 86
- Rüdiger Klapproth, 1992, no. 2499

The Stuttgart Staatsgalerie acquired the Portrait of a Woman Holding a Fan in 1956. From 1896 to 1956 the painting was in the collection of Freiherr von Heyl zu Herrnsheim at Worms and the associated Heylshof Museum trust. Before that it was in the collection of Henry Doetsch.

Curiously, the Staatsgalerie did not count Hals's Portrait of a Woman Holding a Fan (or the pendant) among the highlights of its own collection in a book of nearly 300 pages it published in 2008 titled Staatsgalerie Stuttgart—Die Sammlung: Meisterwerke vom 14. bis zum 21. Jahrhundert (Staatsgalerie Stuttgart—The Collection: Masterpieces from the 14th Century to the 21st Century).
