= Doetsch =

Doetsch is a surname. Notable people with the surname include:

- Alexander Dreymon, (born 1983 as Alexander Doetsch), a German actor
- Gustav Doetsch (1892–1977), German mathematician, aviation researcher
- Henry Doetsch (1839–1894), German-born industrialist who lived in London

== See also ==
- Dietsch (surname)
- Dotsch
