= Laughing Boy (painting) =

Painting by Frans Hals

- Lachende jongen (Dutch)
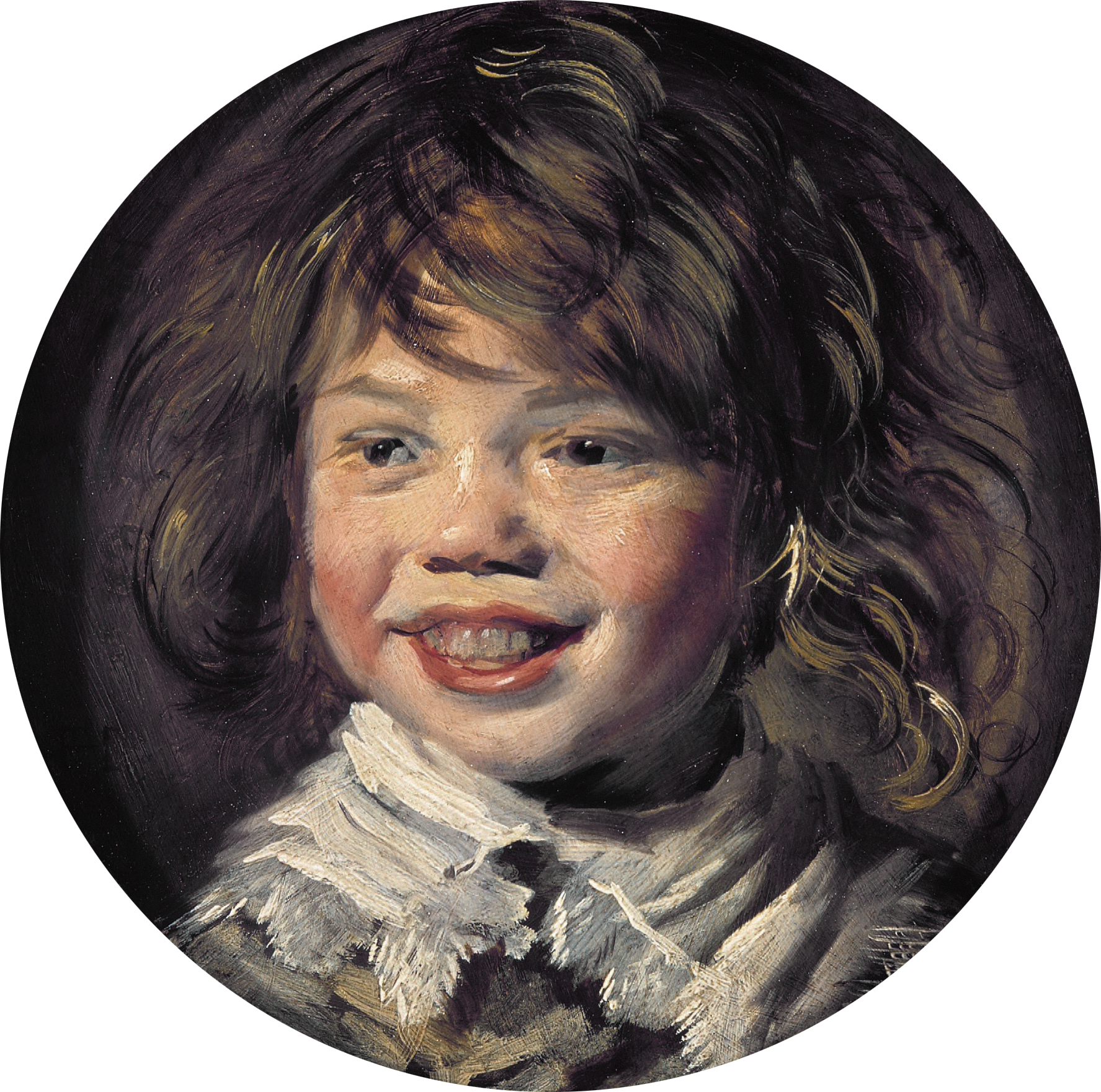
- Artist: Frans Hals
- Year: c. 1625
- Type: Tronie
- Medium: Oil on panel
- Dimensions: 30.45 cm diameter (11.99 in)
- Location: Mauritshuis, The Hague, Netherlands

Laughing Boy (Dutch: Lachende jongen) is a circular oil-on-panel painting by the Dutch artist Frans Hals. It belongs to the tronie genre and was painted around 1625. It is in the collection of the Mauritshuis.

Another circular portrait with a laughing boy is in the collection of the Los Angeles County Museum of Art and shows a soap bubble on the right. A third version exists where the boy is grasping a whistle or flute. Several other circular portraits of laughing boys, all painted around the same period, with or without a bubble or a whistle, have been attributed to Hals in the past. Of the twenty or so paintings identified in 1974 by the Hals expert Seymour Slive, he considered only three to be authentic.

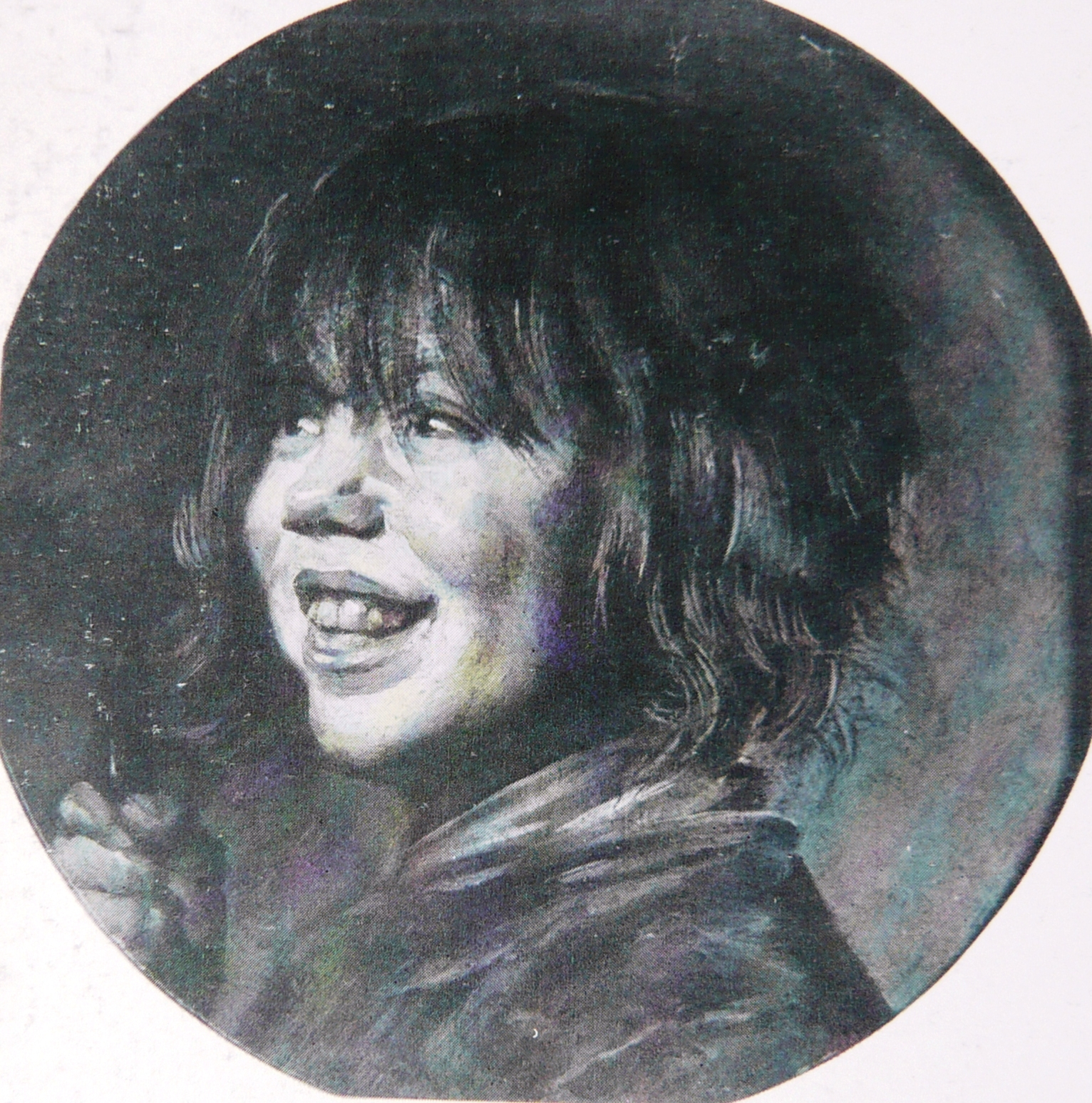
Laughing Boy with Flute, Slive catalog nr. 27

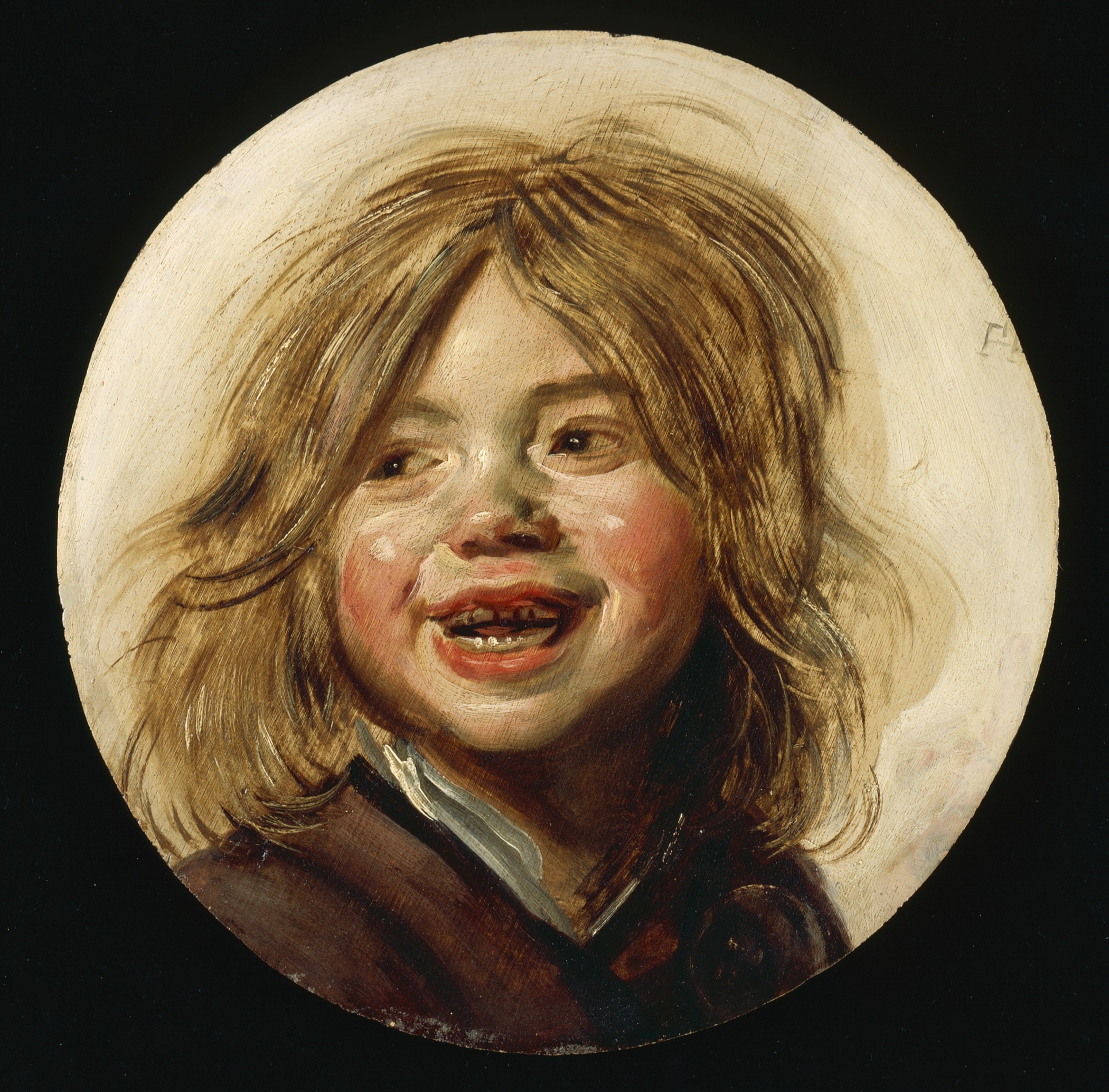
Laughing boy with a soap bubble, Slive catalog nr. 28

The Hals expert Claus Grimm rejected the other two and claims only this one is authentic. In his own time, Hals's works were copied by art students. In the late 19th century young artists in the impressionist movement were impressed by the loose brush strokes and wet-in-wet painting technique of these small tondos, and it is possible that a few of the many copies on the art market today date from this later period.

Other boys painted by Hals in round tondos:

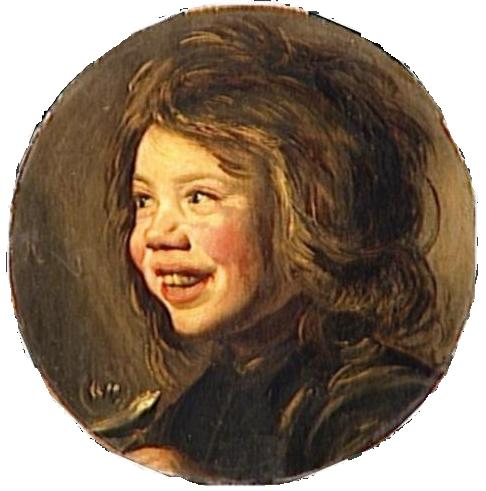
Boy with a soap bubble, Louvre Museum

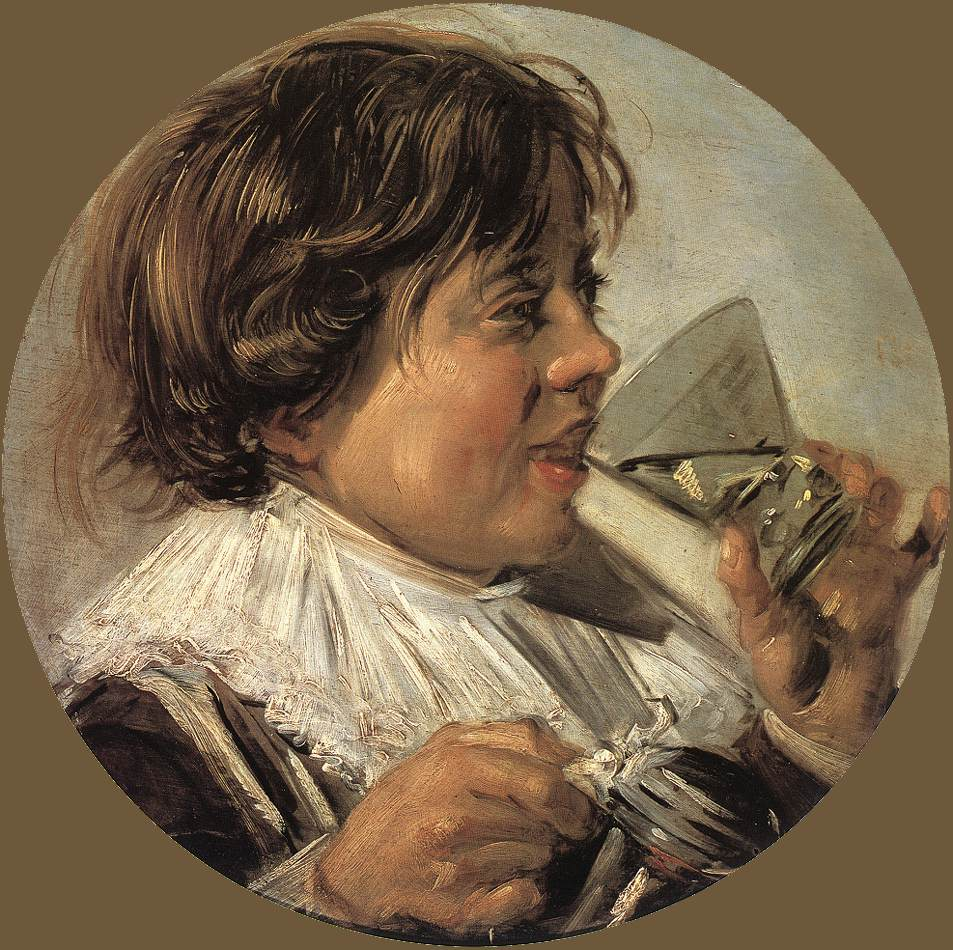
Boy with a glass and a pewter jug, Staatliches Museum Schwerin

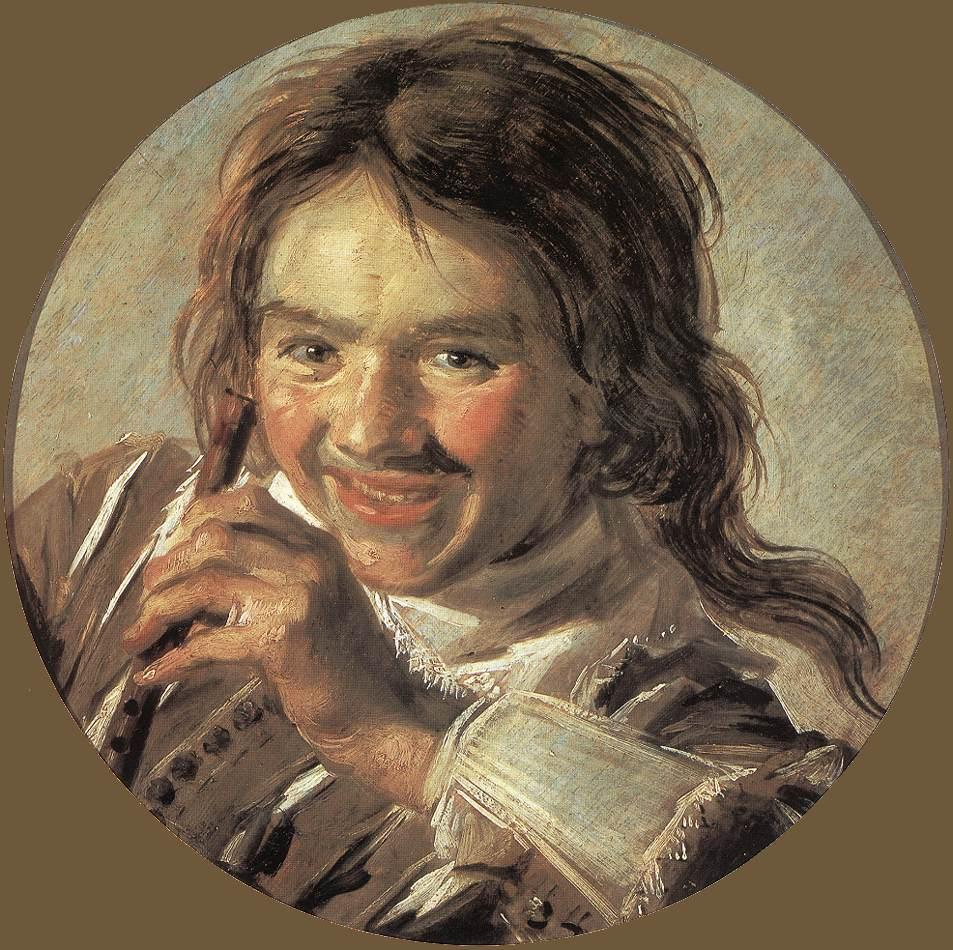
Laughing boy with a flute, Staatliches Museum Schwerin

== See also ==
- List of paintings by Frans Hals
