= Portrait of a Man Holding a Skull (Hals; Birmingham) =

Painting by Frans Hals

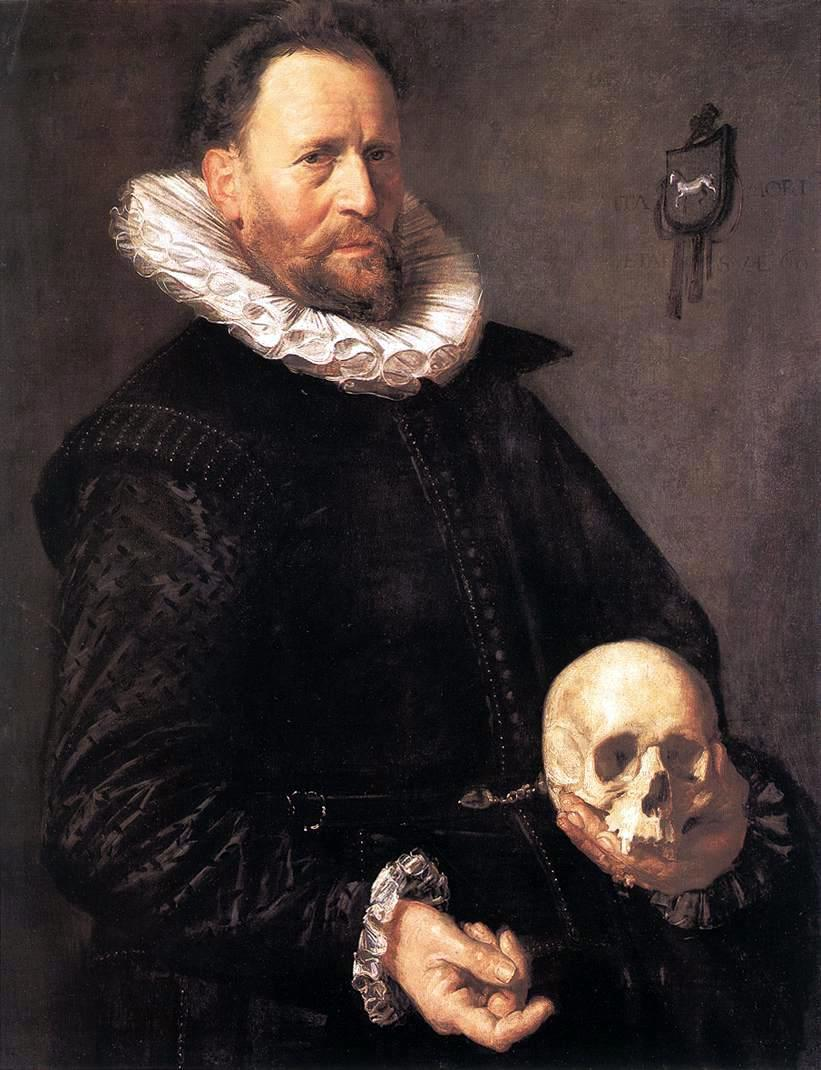
- Artists: Frans Hals, lived from (probably) late 1582 to 26 August 1666
- Year: Probably about 1610 to 1614
- Medium: Oil colours on an oak panel
- Subject: Head and upper body of a 60-year-old man dressed in black; in his left hand a skull
- Dimensions: 94 cm × 72.5 cm (37 in × 29 in)
- Location: Barber Institute of Fine Arts, Birmingham, England
- Accession: 38.6

Portrait of a Man Holding a Skull is a name for an untitled figurative painting by Frans Hals in the permanent collection of the Barber Institute of Fine Arts in Birmingham. Hals was a male 17th-century Dutch master specialising in portraits and other pictures of people. He probably painted this early work at Haarlem in about 1610 to 1614, although the authoritative writers' views vary slightly concerning the date. The identity of the sitter is not now known.

The subject wears a neat full beard and is dressed in black with a white ruff and white cuffs. He was 60 when Hals painted this picture of him. The skull in his cupped left hand is a memento mori, a reminder that we all must die. The painting is generally agreed to be one of a pair of pendant marriage portraits; Hals's matching portrait of this sitter's wife, who is also unidentified, hangs at Chatsworth House.

== Description ==
The work depicts a man shown three-quarter length, his head and body turned three-quarters towards the right of the frame (that is, towards his left) while he looks straight at the artist—or at us. His look is stern but engaging. When Hals painted him, the subject was 60 (Latin "ætat suæ 60" in the legend below the miniature gonfalon in the top-right corner of the painting).

Conventionally, the companion portrait of his wife would hang to the right of the husband's portrait, and this man's stance relates to her presence there. We can see both his hands: in his left he holds a skull (which, like the sitter, would be "looking at us" if we imagine ourselves positioned in front of and between the two pendant portraits as they hang side by side); with his right hand he gestures towards the skull, and perhaps also towards the conspicuously heavy golden chain his wife wears at her waist.

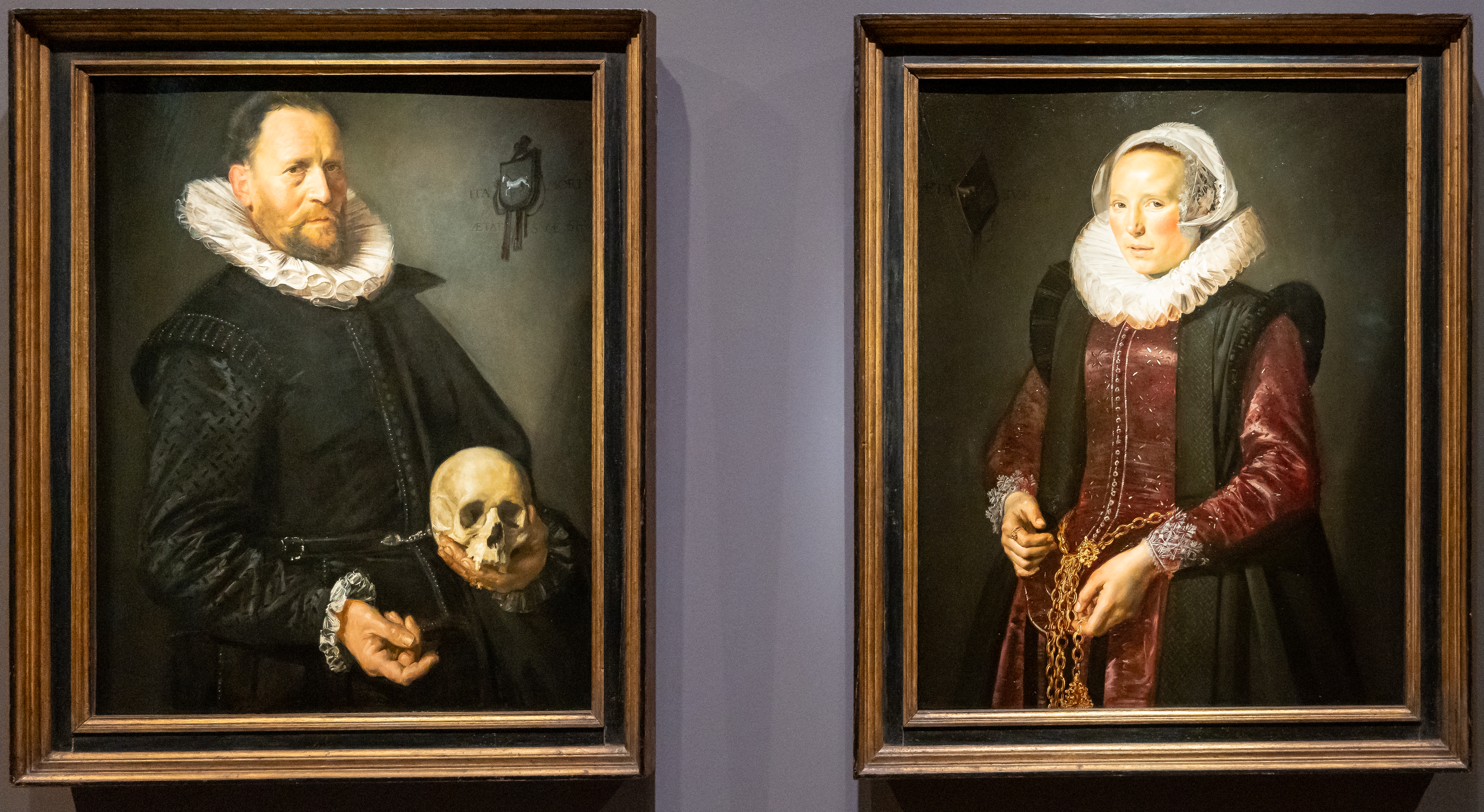
Portrait of a Man Holding a Skull and its pendant Portrait of a Woman Standing (Devonshire collection, Chatsworth House) seen together in Berlin at an exhibition of Hals's work in 2024.

=== Composition ===
Our eye is drawn from the hands and skull along the straight diagonal line of the subject's left arm towards his head, which for emphasis stands a little proud of that line.

The man is posed well forward in his portrait, filling the panel from top to bottom and, in the lower part, almost from side to side. (Compare his wife, who is positioned a little further back in her portrait.) His straight-backed stance is quite formal in comparison with many of Hals's later works. Also, in later portraits Hals would often position the subject's head further from the top of the picture for a more approachable look. (Compare the other works, including the pendant pairs of portraits, illustrated in Wikipedia's List of paintings by Frans Hals.)

=== Materials; cradle; conservation ===
The Portrait of a Man Holding a Skull is painted in oils on a panel that measures some 94 x 73 cm (height x width)—a convenient size for it to hang together with its similarly sized pendant in, for instance, the substantial canal house of a Dutch regent. The panel is made from a single, unusually broad plank of oak that is free of any joins. Its grain exactly mirrors that of the similarly sized panel on which Hals painted the pendant Portrait of a Woman Standing; husband and wife are on "bookmatched" his-and-hers panels from the same part of the same tree.

At some time probably in the 19th or early 20th century, the back of the Portrait of a Man Holding a Skull was cradled to keep the painted surface flat (an irreversible practice now no longer favoured by conservators).

In 2023, Larry Keith cleaned and conserved both the Portrait of a Man Holding a Skull and its pendant Portrait of a Woman Standing in London at the National Gallery, in preparation for the Frans Hals exhibition which opened there that year.

=== Background ===
The background of the painting is a greyish brown; dark on the left, a little lighter to the right. It is featureless apart from the little gonfalon and some text adjacent to it. The angle at which the gonfalon hangs suggests that it is mounted on a receding wall. The heraldic badge on the gonfalon appears to represent the white Saxon Steed device in the arms and flag of the Twente region in the east of the Netherlands (but see the discussion of the sitter's identity, below). If the badge is indeed meant to show a Saxon Steed, Hals has eschewed the usual bright red field: perhaps the red would have been too distracting in the otherwise plain background. The text around the gonfalon includes not only the sitter's age, but also a dour Latin warning: "ita mori"—this is what becomes of us after we die (presumably referring to the skull).

=== Light and colour ===
The quite bright light in the picture falls across the sitter's face as if from a tall window to the left of the frame, as is often the case in Hals's portraits. (Compare the illustrations in Wikipedia's List of paintings by Frans Hals.) The light picks out significant elements in the otherwise subdued whole: the head (with extra emphasis and separation from the body supplied by the ruff), the gesturing right hand, and the skull. For the rest, in this portrait as in many of his others, Hals deploys a nearly monochromatic, mostly dark, palette in which black and dark grey tones dominate.

=== Clothes and grooming ===
The sitter wears a black doublet which has lustrous dark grey or black sleeves with a simple diagonal pattern resembling modern diamond plate, apparently in a damask weave. The doublet buttons are tightly spaced. Parallel to the buttons runs a row of little black beads, possibly of jet or glass. They catch the light, as do more such ornaments at the man's shoulder. The man wears a black belt with a silver buckle at his right hip and a simple silver coupling at the navel. His plain white batiste ruff is starched but relatively relaxed in form and size, as are his short wavy cuffs. (Compare, for example, the more elaborate clothes in Hals's 1625 portrait of Jacob Pieterszoon Olycan.) He wears his hair and his full beard short, and he wears no hat. The particular style of ruff and the trim of the beard were fashionable in the early 1610s; compare Rubens's group portrait of Jan Brueghel the Elder with his family from about 1613–1615.

When Hals painted the Portrait of a Man Holding a Skull, black attire was popular among male merchants, professionals, ecclesiastics, and magistrates in the Dutch Republic (where commerce, the sciences, and the arts were beginning to flourish in the Twelve Years' Truce). Black was chic, evoking seriousness, religiosity, and restrained sobriety, and Hals would become famous for his masterly handling of black clothes. As Vincent van Gogh enthused 260 years later in a letter to his brother Theo: "Frans Hals heeft wel zeven en twintig zwarten" (Frans Hals must have twenty-seven shades of black).

== Identity of the subject ==
Hals did not give his works titles, and there is no known record of this portrait from Hals's time. Nonetheless, the sitter might yet be identifiable by way of the arms on the portrait in combination with circumstantial evidence from civic or church records of marriages and the like. If the white horse in the Portrait of a Man Holding a Skull is meant to be a Saxon Steed, it could point to a connection with Twente or with any of various places in Germany. There is also a heraldic badge in the pendant Portrait of a Woman Standing (which is however obscure and which, in the early 20th century, Cornelis Hofstede de Groot reported as having been repainted).

== Date; place in Hals's œuvre ==
Assuming Hals was born in about 1582, he would already have been in his late twenties or early thirties when he painted the Man Holding a Skull in around 1610–1614. Those dates are conjectural but many of the authoritative writers agree. (A prestigious outlier, Claus Grimm, dates Hals's Man Holding a Skull to slightly later—"1617/18".) Yet this is one of Hals's very earliest known works, with probably only the Portrait of Jacobus Zaffius and presumably the Chatsworth Portrait of a Woman Standing being as early. It was not until 1610, when Hals was in his late twenties, that he was admitted to the Haarlem Guild of Saint Luke, the guild representing the interests and regulating the business practice of established painters—including, but not only, konstschilders (art, or artisan, painters). For comparison, Pieter de Molijn, who was roughly Hals's contemporary, entered the same Haarlem guild when he was about 21. Guild membership as a master was generally a condition for making and selling paintings for one's own account and running a workshop with apprentices. Becoming a master painter typically required at least three years' apprenticeship (pupillage, traineeship) often from age 12, with additional time as a journeyman, as well as the guild's acceptance of a masterpiece. We know the young Hals was apprenticed to Karel van Mander at some time before 1603 (when Van Mander left Haarlem), though Van Mander was chiefly a mannerist painter of classical allegory, and none of Hals's known work is anything like that of Van Mander. The Man Holding a Skull is an accomplished work of portraiture, which suggests that Hals may also have trained under a master portraitist and possibly that he painted or contributed to now unknown or unrecognised works as a journeyman before 1610. Our knowledge of Hals's life before he gains admission to the guild and paints the Portrait of a Man Holding a Skull is thin. We do know he worked for the Haarlem authorities assessing and restoring old works of art that had been removed from Roman Catholic church buildings before they were taken over by the Reformed movement.

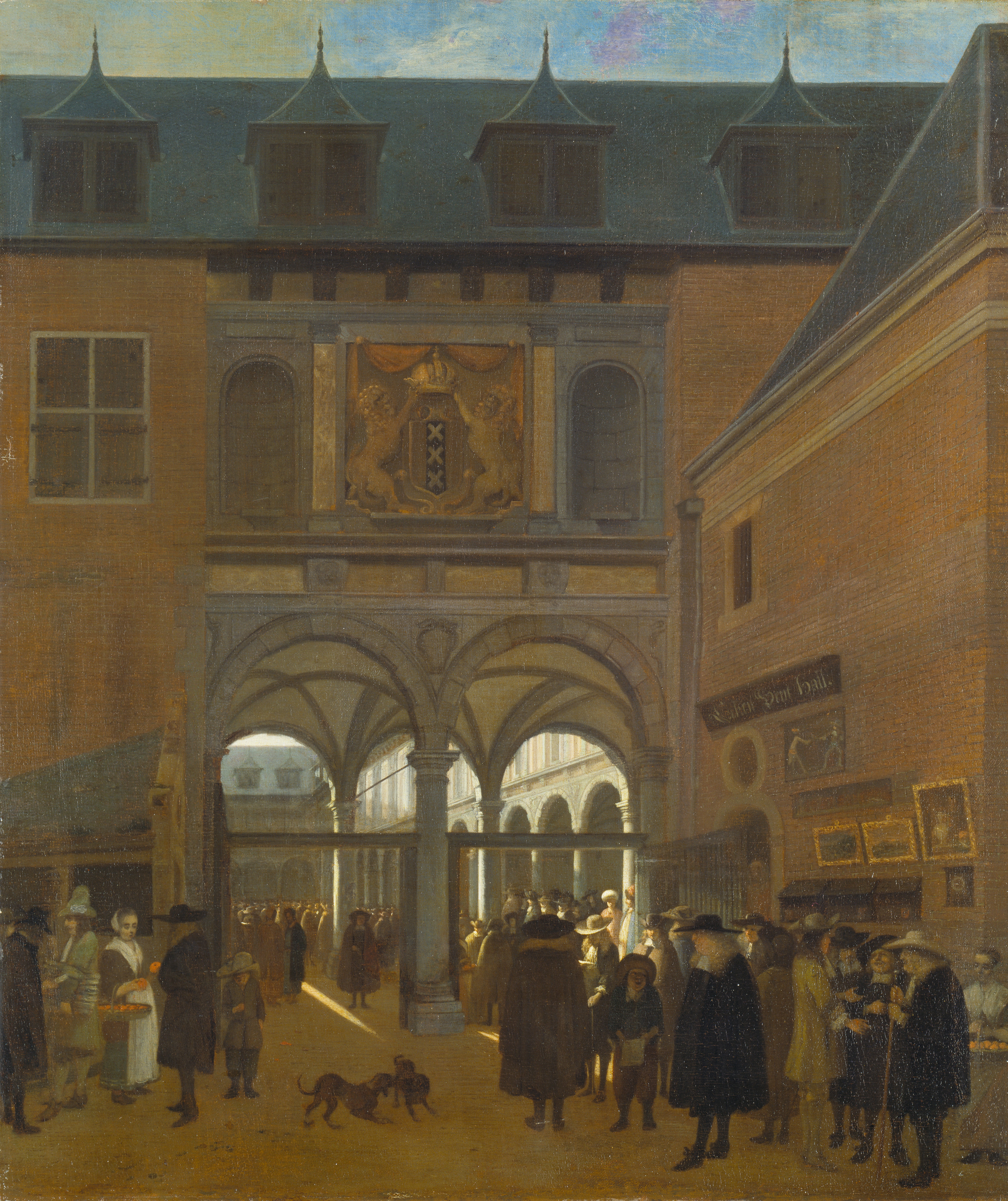
The open art market: In the 17th century, there was little call for religious art to hang in Protestant Dutch churches, but ordinary townspeople in the Dutch Republic would buy paintings (such as tronies and genre works) to hang at home. Open-market channels for art included lotteries and Dutch auctions as well as retail sales. On the right-hand side of this 1670s painting by Job Berckheyde (at the Städel, Frankfurt) we can see the stall of an art retailer outside the Amsterdam stock exchange.

The inclusion of props in a commissioned portrait, such as the "remember-you-too-must-die" skull in this very early painting by Hals, would have been the choice of the sitter, not of the artist. The skull imparts a somewhat gloomy, moralising feel to which (as far as we know) Hals never returned in his later work. (More than a decade later, he did paint at least one other figure holding a skull, but that was a piece probably made for the open market and it conveys a very different atmosphere.)

Portraits and other pictures of people that Hals painted in the 1620s and later in life were prized for their vivacity and painterly style. This early Portrait in Birmingham (made in about 1612) is quite still. Little movement is implied. The sitter holds a static pose that stabilises, but also inactivates, his appearance, possibly reflecting an already old-fashioned mannerist style of portraiture with which Hals would have been familiar.

== Hals's style and technique ==
Karel van Mander, the master under whom Hals learnt his trade in the early years of the 17th century, taught a distinction between the rough ('rouw') and the smooth or neat ('net') styles of painting. He advised apprentices and beginners to learn to paint in the smooth style before attempting the rough, because the rough is more difficult. Later in life, Hals would be appreciated for his flamboyantly painterly (or, in the terminology of his time, "rough") style—particularly, but not only, in his paintings of men. It was once generally assumed that Hals often painted alla prima (meaning quickly, all in one go, wet on wet) to achieve a lively effect, but more recent research tells us he painstakingly constructed his works layer upon dried layer (however "rough" he may have left those layers).

By the early 1630s, when married couples commissioned Hals to paint them in a pair of pendant portraits, he typically painted the man relatively loosely (or "roughly") in a relaxed pose and the woman quite neatly (or "smoothly") in a conventional, formal pose. Compare, for instance, two of his portraits in the Amsterdam Rijksmuseum that make a pendant pair: the portraits of Nicolaes Hasselaer and Sara Wolphaerts van Diemen, which are illustrated side by side in the Wikipedia article about the Sara Wolphaerts van Diemen portrait. The Barber Institute's Man Holding a Skull and its Chatsworth House pendant are not so disparate in style—neither is noticeably painterly, nor is either meticulously neat.

== Attribution; provenance; exhibitions ==
The Portrait of a Man Holding a Skull is not signed, nor (as far as we know) was it documented in its own age, but its attribution to Frans Hals is not in doubt.

Among the authors of catalogues raisonnés and exhibition catalogues who have attributed the Man Holding a Skull to Hals are:

- Wilhelm von Bode and M.J. Binder, 1914, no. 88
- Wilhelm Valentiner, 1923, no. 4
- Miss C.A. van Hees and Seymour Slive for the Frans Hals Museum, Haarlem, 1962, no. 1
- Seymour Slive for the Royal Academy of Arts, London, 1989, no. 2
- Claus Grimm, 1989, no. 6
- Bart Cornelis for the National Gallery, London, and the Rijksmuseum, Amsterdam, 2023, fig. 58

Cornelis Hofstede de Groot did not include the Portrait of a Man Holding a Skull in the Frans Hals volume (Volume III) of his Catalogue Raisonné (1910).

The Barber's inaugural director, Thomas Bodkin, acquired the Portrait of a Man Holding a Skull from Bond Street art conservator, dealer, and collector Horace Buttery in 1938. The purchase price was modest, reflecting Buttery's preference that the work hang in a British gallery rather than be exported across the Atlantic.

In 1962, the Portrait of a Man Holding a Skull travelled to Haarlem in celebration of the municipal Frans Hals Museum's centenary. It featured in the exhibition there as the "first-impression" painting, as it did at seminal Frans Hals exhibitions in London in the 2020s: Frans Hals—The Male Portrait at the Wallace Collection in 2021–2022; and Frans Hals at the National Gallery in 2023–2024. It was also shown at the 2024 Frans Hals—Meister des Augenblicks exhibition in Berlin at the Gemäldegalerie. Those exhibitions at the Frans Hals Museum, the National Gallery, and the Gemäldegalerie hung the Portrait of a Man Holding a Skull together with its pendant portrait from Chatsworth House. The Portrait of a Man Holding a Skull also featured in a 2024 exhibition of Hals's work at the Rijksmuseum, Amsterdam, which was similar to (and shared its catalogue with) the preceding exhibition at the National Gallery in London.

When the Barber Institute temporarily closed for refurbishment in 2025–2026, the Portrait of a Man Holding a Skull was shown at the Courtauld Gallery, London in an exhibition titled The Barber in London: Highlights from a Remarkable Collection. Like the Barber, the Courtauld is a teaching collection attached to a university. Both collections admit members of the public to see the works they hold.

== See also ==
- List of paintings by Frans Hals
- Young Man with a Skull
