= Laughing Boy with Flute =

Painting by Frans Hals

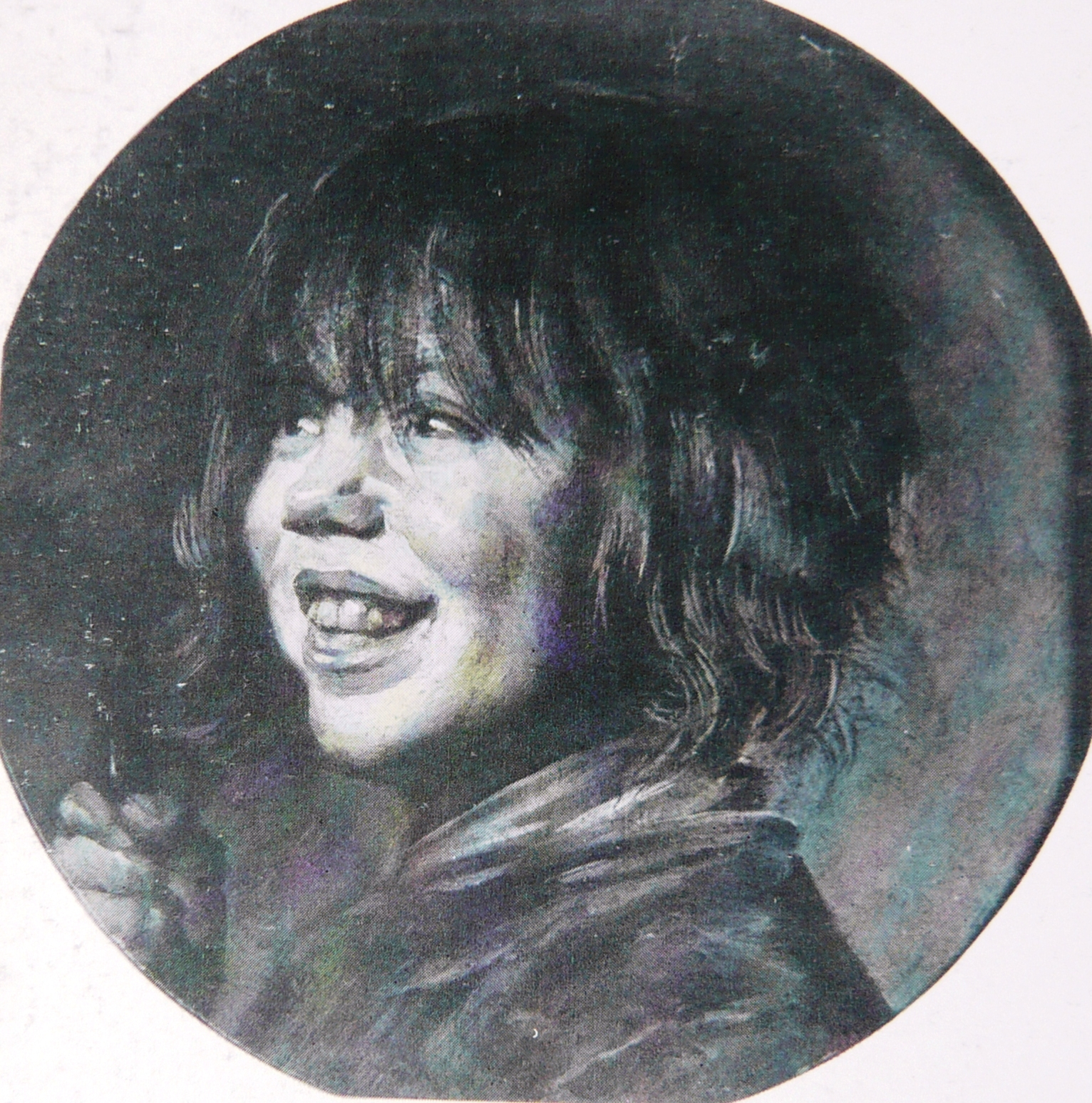
- Laughing Boy with a Flute, c.1625 Oil on canvas, 28 cm round
- Artist: Frans Hals
- Year: c. 1625
- Catalogue: Seymour Slive, Catalog 1974: #27
- Medium: Oil on canvas
- Dimensions: 28 cm diameter (11 in)

Laughing Boy with a Flute is an oil-on-canvas painting by the Dutch Golden Age painter Frans Hals, painted in the early 1620s.

== Painting ==
This painting was documented by Hofstede de Groot in 1910, who wrote "31. A LAUGHING BOY WITH A FLUTE. M. 240. Half-length, in profile to the left. The head is three-quarters left. The long hair falls in disorder. The lips are parted, showing the teeth. On the left the flute is held upright in the right hand. The eyes look to the left and slightly upward. Lifelike colour in the face. Circular panel, n| inches across the grain of the wood running diagonally. A copy is in the Boucher de Perthes Museum, Abbeville. In the collection of the late Alfred Beit, London. In the collection of Otto Beit, London."

Hofstede de Groot noted several laughing boys by Hals along with this one (catalogue numbers 11 through to 39). This painting was also documented by W.R. Valentiner in 1923.

Other boys painted by Hals in round tondos:

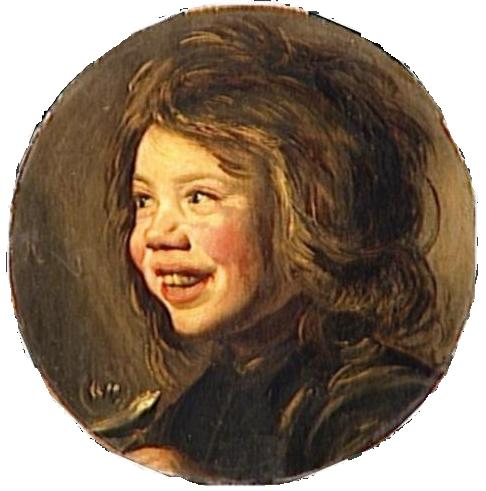
Boy with a soap bubble, Louvre Museum

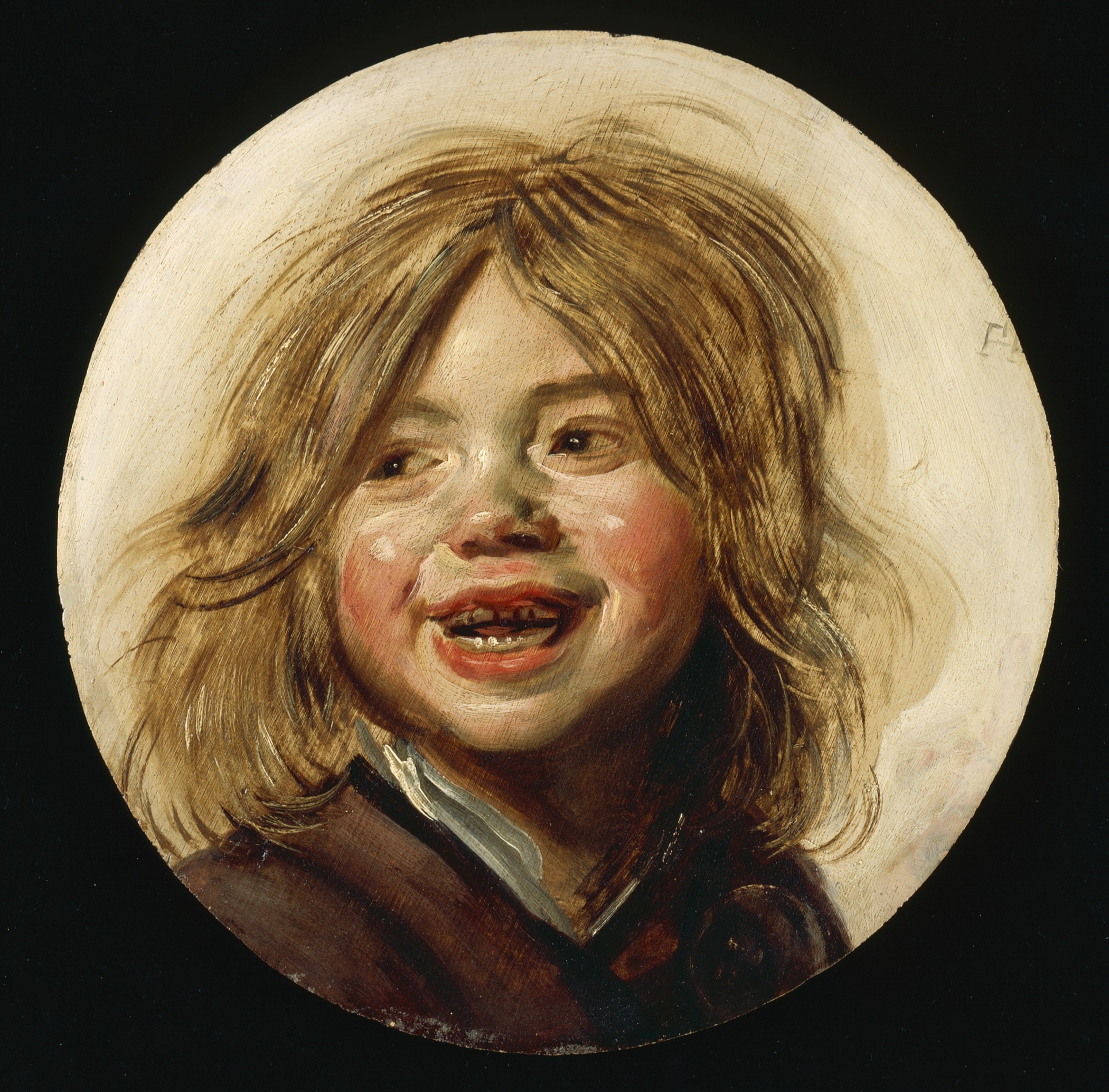
Laughing Boy, Los Angeles County Museum of Art

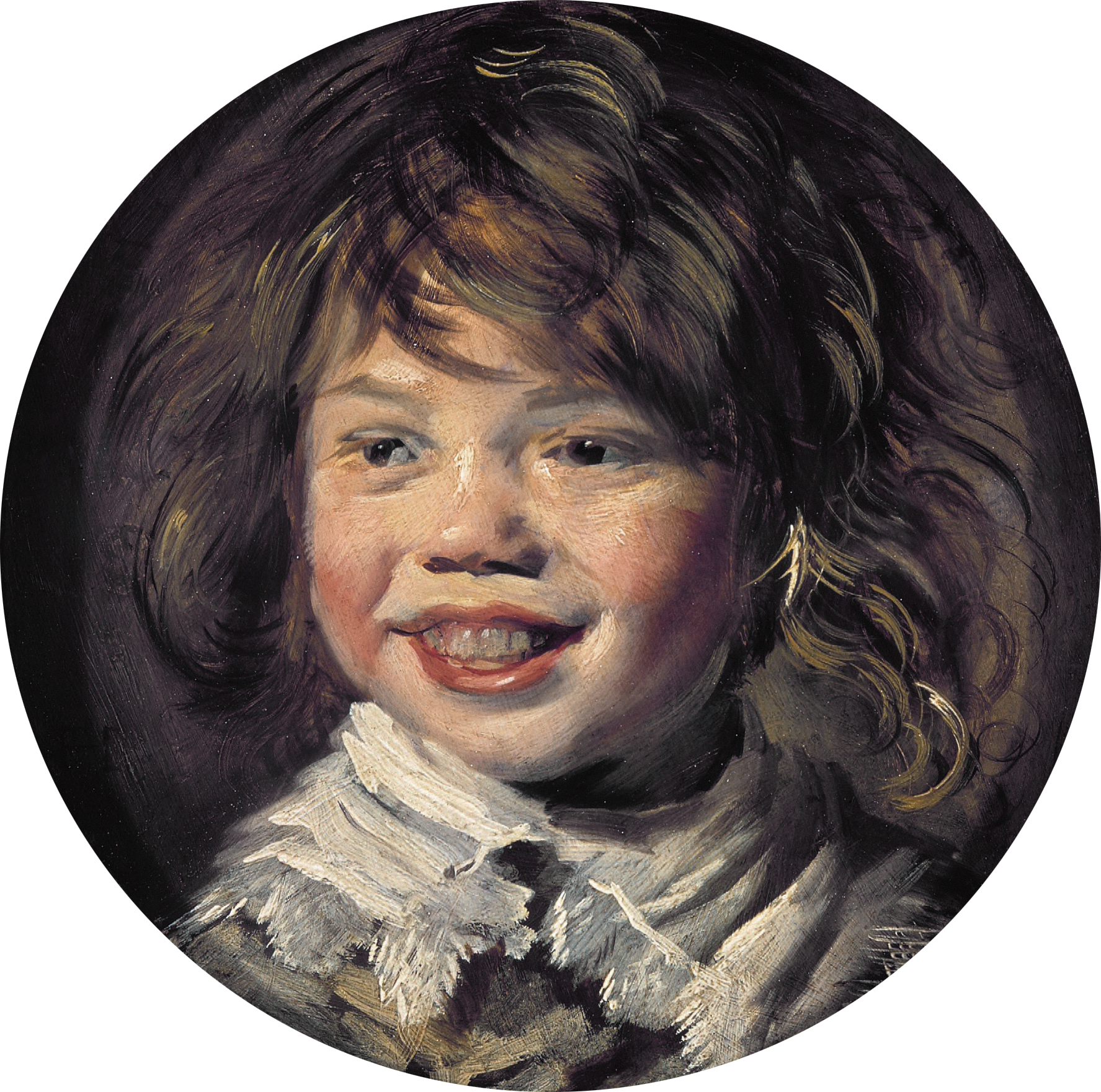
Laughing Boy (painting), Mauritshuis

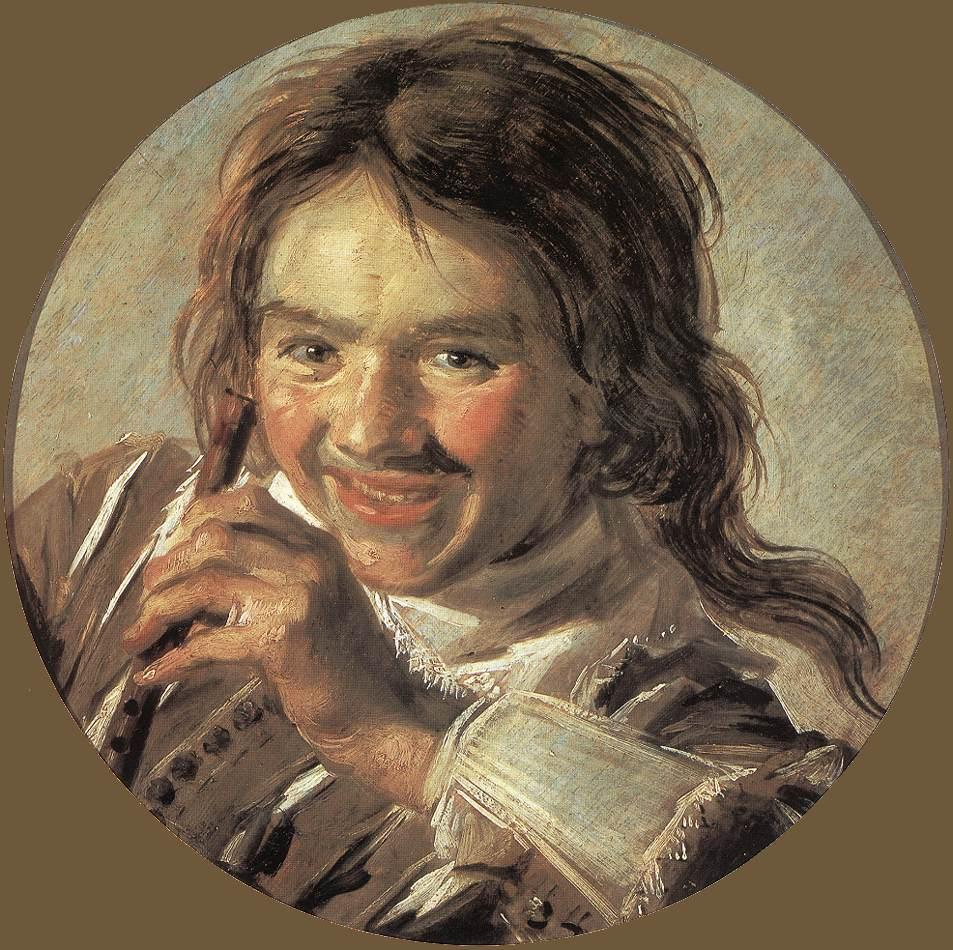
Laughing boy with a flute, Staatliches Museum Schwerin

== See also ==
- List of paintings by Frans Hals
