= Portrait of a Woman Standing =

Painting by Frans Hals

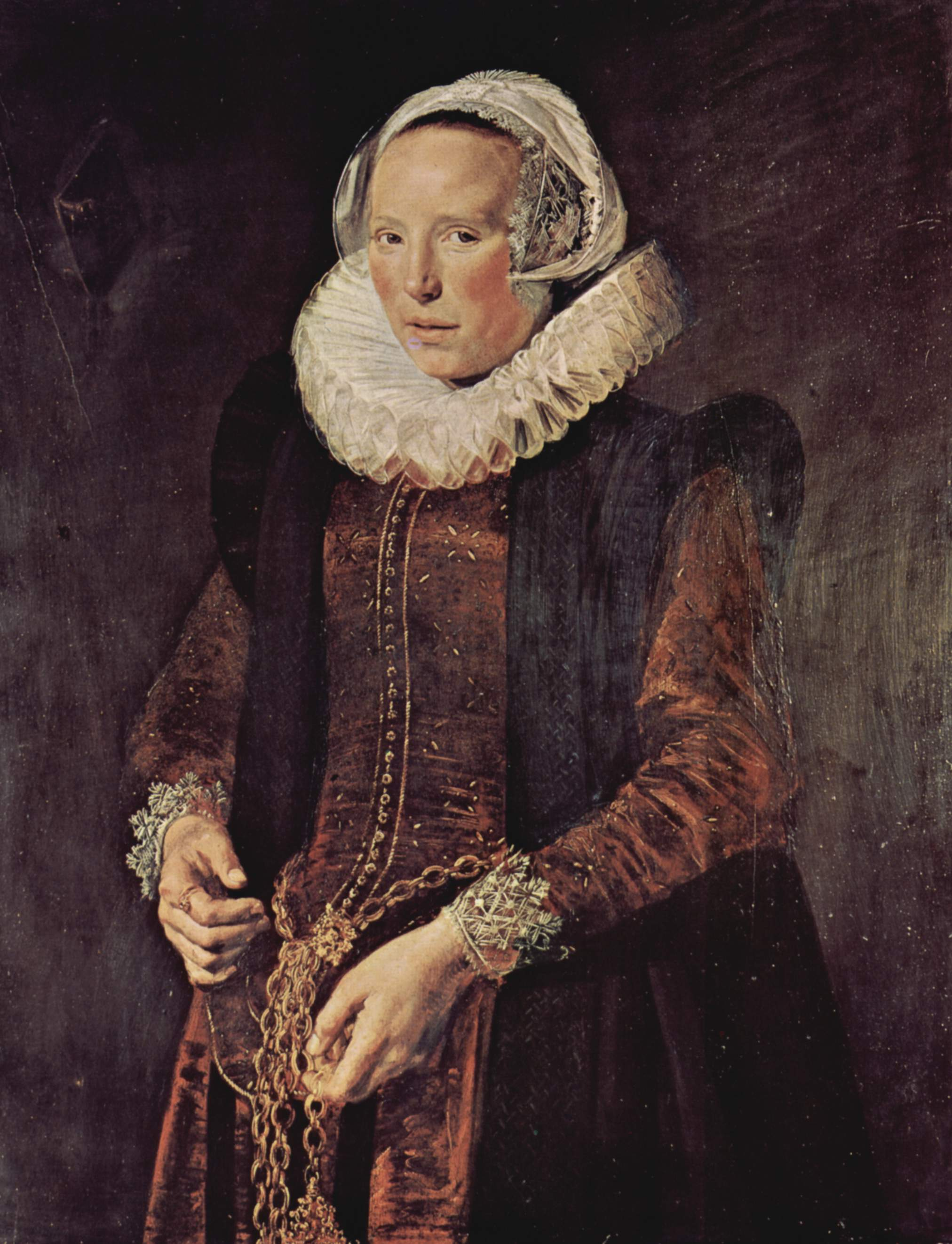
- Portrait of a Woman Standing, about 1611, oil on panel
- Artist: Frans Hals
- Year: 1610
- Catalogue: Hofstede de Groot, Catalog 1910: #382
- Medium: Oil on canvas
- Dimensions: 94.2 cm × 71.1 cm (37.1 in × 28.0 in)
- Location: Chatsworth House, Derbyshire
- Accession: 267

Portrait of a Woman Standing is a painting by the Dutch Golden Age painter Frans Hals, painted in 1610–1615 and now in Chatsworth House. It is considered a marriage pendant portrait to the Portrait of a Man Holding a Skull, which hangs at the Barber Institute in Birmingham.

== Painting ==
This painting was documented by Hofstede de Groot in 1910, who wrote:

PORTRAIT OF A WOMAN STANDING. B. 145; M. 197. Almost three-quarter-length. She is turned three-quarters left, and looks at the spectator. Her left hand grasps her gold chain; the right hand is extended before her. She wears a lace-trimmed cap, a black silk dress, a ruff, and lace wristbands. To the left is a coat-of-arms, which has been repainted. This is not, as has been assumed, a pendant to 287. It was painted about the years 1630–35. Inscribed near the coat-of-arms, "aeta suae 37"; panel, 37 inches by 28 inches (within the frame). Exhibited at the Whitechapel Art Gallery, London, 1904, No. 284. In the collection of the Duke of Devonshire, London.

In 1974 Seymour Slive listed the painting as the pendant of A Man Holding a Skull and claimed then that despite cleaning of the coat of arms and recent documents the provenance was still inconclusive, and he read the inscription as "aeta suae 31", leading him to conclude the woman was aged 31 at marriage rather than 37. Slive felt the painting could be dated to Hals' earliest period but felt there was too little "Hals juvenalia" to date it with certainty before 1610. In 1989 Claus Grimm listed it again as a pendant of the Man Holding a Skull but felt that it may have been painted somewhat later, but agreed with Slive that the period was before 1620.

== Possible pendant ==
The likely pendant to this painting is the Portrait of a Man Holding a Skull.

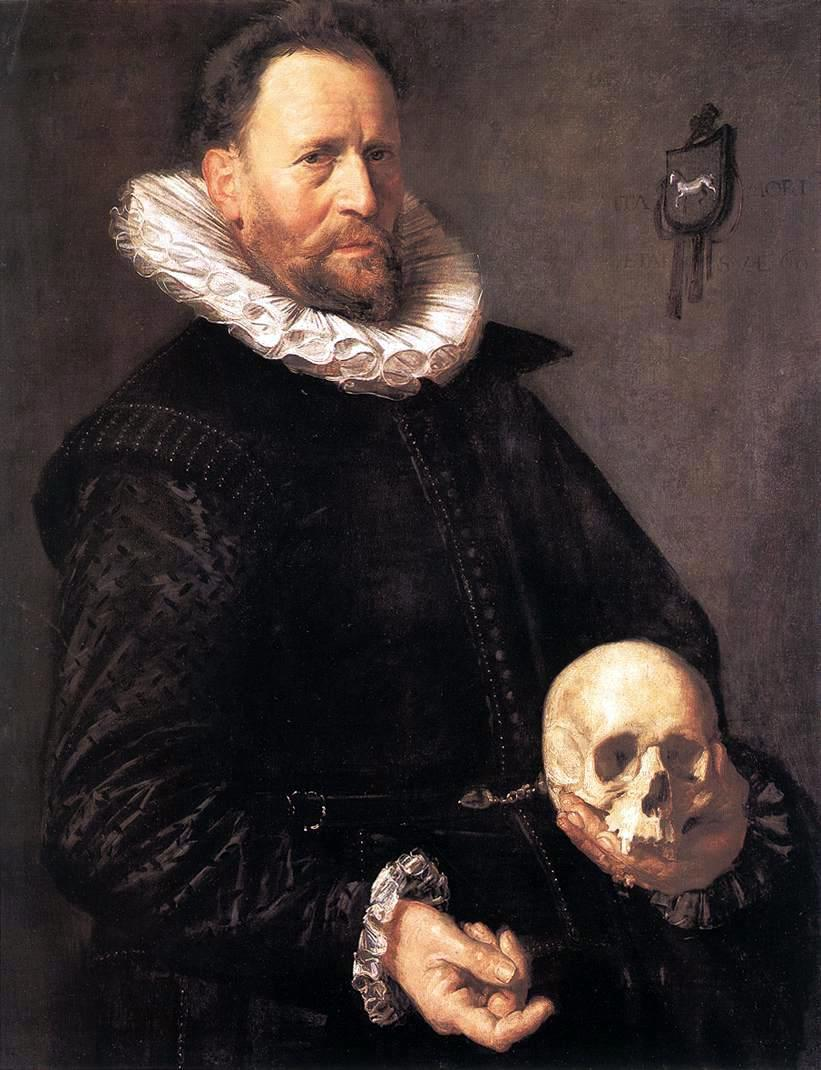
Portrait of a Man Holding a Skull, attributed to the period around 1612 before Hals painted his first militia company

== See also ==
- List of paintings by Frans Hals
