= Young Man with a Skull =

Painting by Frans Hals

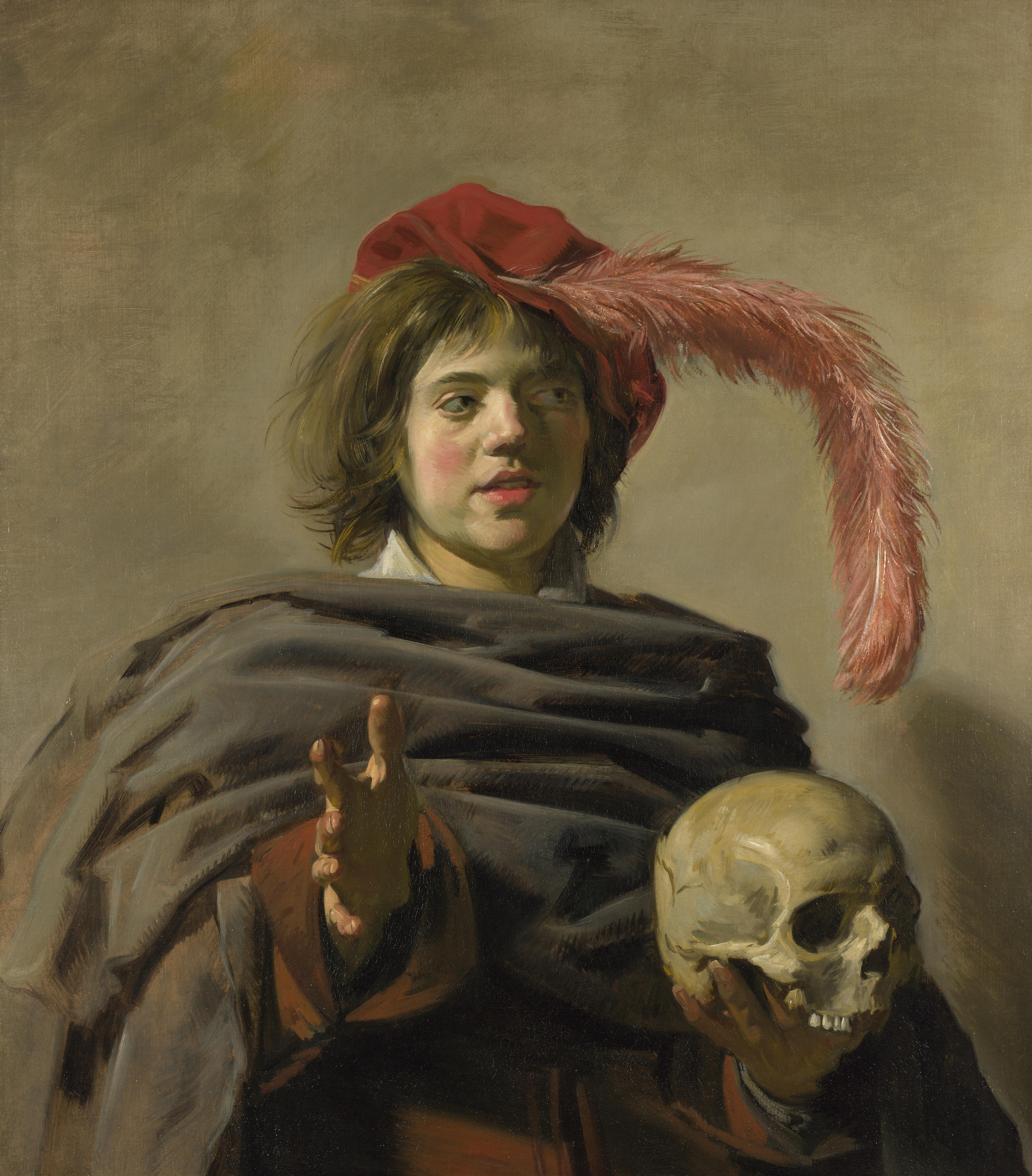
- Artist: Frans Hals
- Year: 1626–1628
- Catalogue: Seymour Slive, Catalog 1974: #61
- Medium: Oil on canvas
- Dimensions: 92 cm × 81 cm (36 in × 32 in)
- Location: National Gallery, London
- Accession: NG6458

Young Man with a Skull is an oil-on-canvas painting by the Dutch Golden Age painter Frans Hals, created in 1626-1628, now in the National Gallery, London. The painting was previously thought to be a depiction of Shakespeare's Prince Hamlet holding the skull of Yorick, but is now considered to be a vanitas, a reminder of the precarious nature of life and the inevitability of death.

== Painting ==
The painting shows a young man wearing a feathered red bonnet and swathed with a cloak across his chest, gesturing dramatically towards the viewer with his right hand while holding a skull in his left hand. It was first documented by Hofstede de Groot in 1910, who described it as a life-size half-length portrait of Hamlet. De Groot also wrote that it was exhibited on loan in the Dublin National Gallery in 1895. He noticed this painting's similarity to another painting by Hals, and he remarked that in this work the subject's right hand "formerly rested on a skull which has been painted out".

The interpretation as a theatrical portrayal of Hamlet was called into question by W.R. Valentiner in 1923. In his 1989 catalog of the international Frans Hals exhibition, Slive claims it is a vanitas and compares it to several other examples of men portrayed with skulls. He rejects the identification as Hamlet, because Shakespeare's plays have not been recorded in the Northern Netherlands in the 1620s.

It was bought by the National Gallery, London in 1980. They write that: "The Netherlandish tradition of showing young boys holding skulls is well-established and can be traced back to engravings of the early 16th century."

The National Gallery also notes the exotic costume of the subject, similar to that shown by the Utrecht Caravaggists. Hals' depiction of the subject's costume, holding a skull with a draped cloak over the chest, is similar to at least four other known paintings:

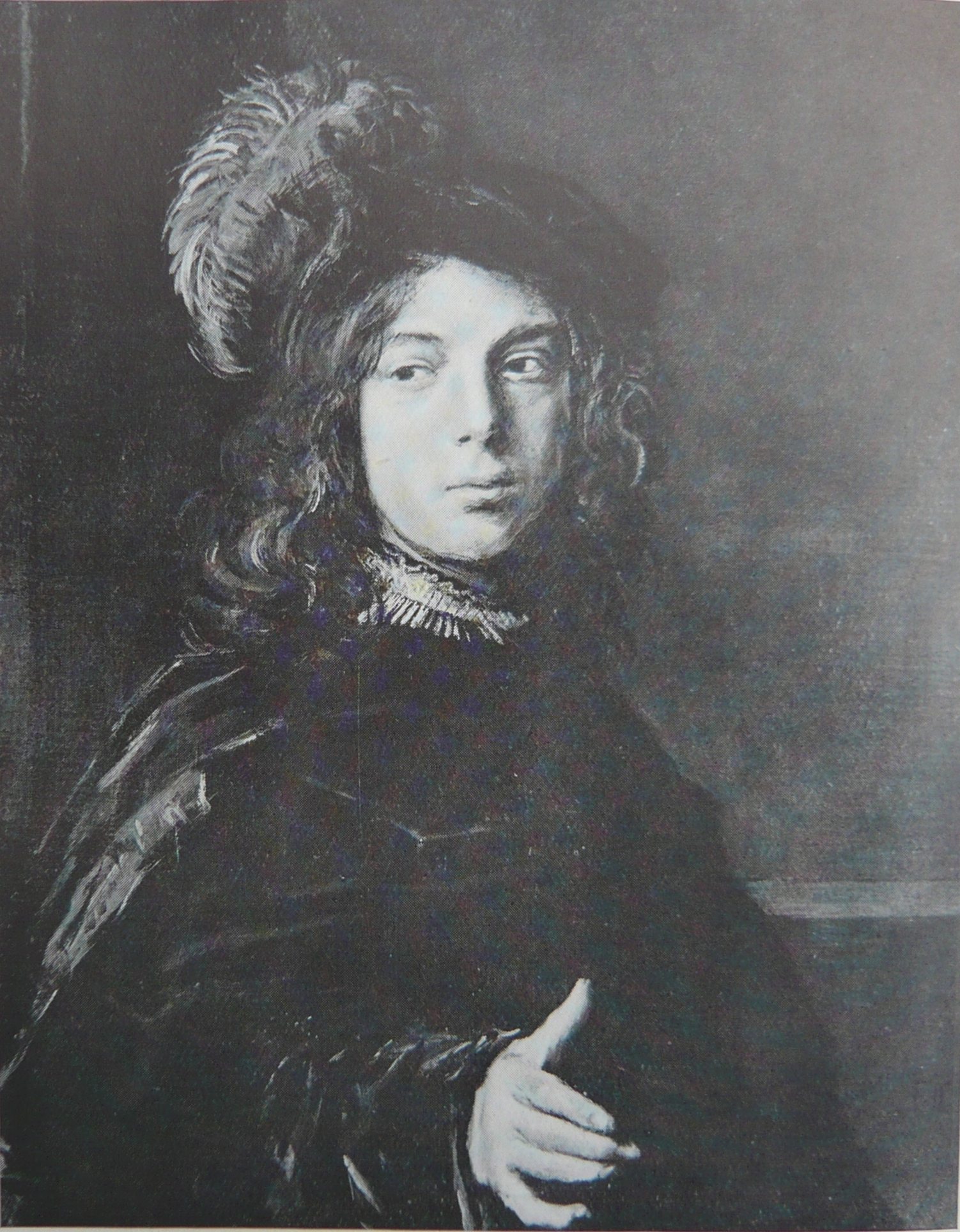
Boy in a feather hat by Frans Hals
(skull is painted out)

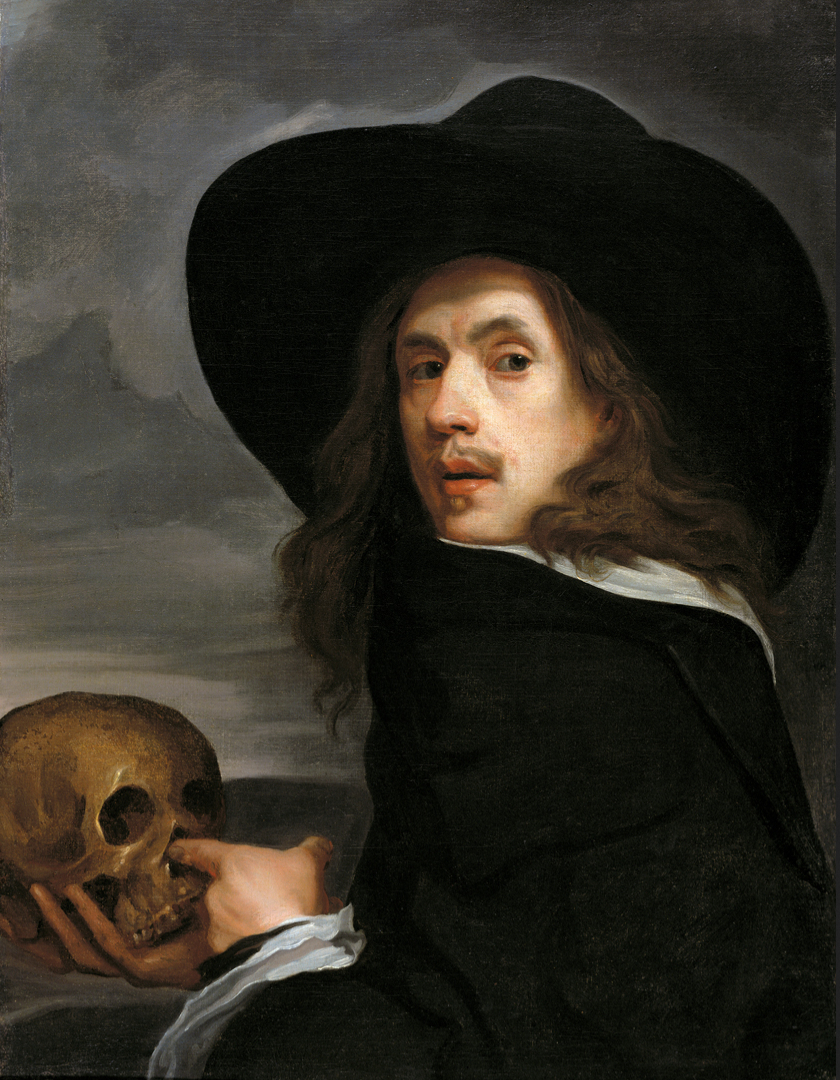
Self portrait by Michael Sweerts
(skull was previously painted out)

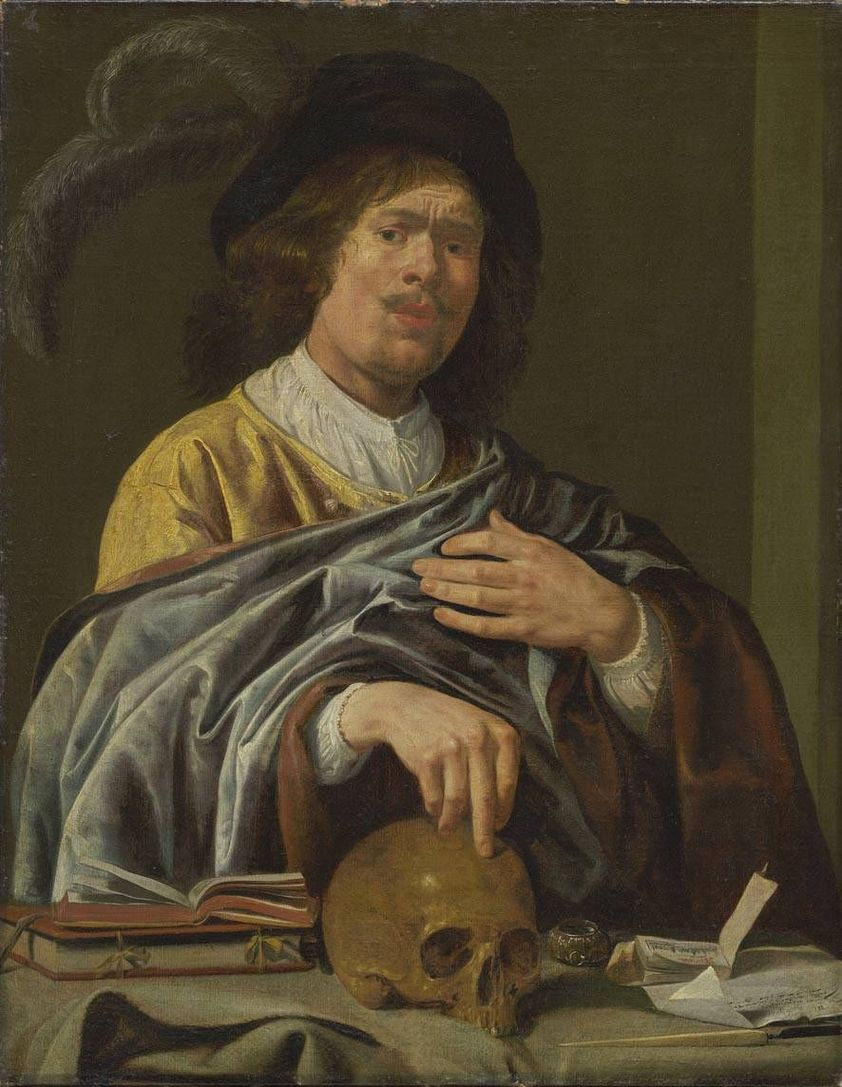
Self portrait by Jan Miense Molenaer

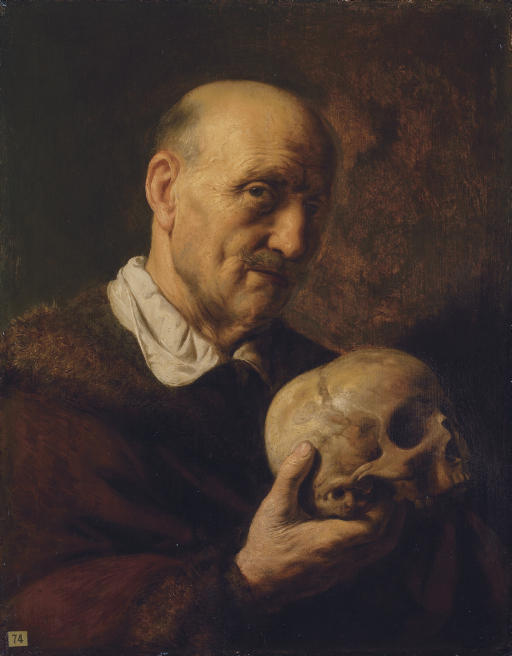
Old man with a skull, by Jan Lievens

== See also ==
- List of paintings by Frans Hals
- Portrait of a Man Holding a Skull
