= Dotsch =

Dotsch or Dötsch is a German surname. Notable people with this surname include:

- Albin Dötsch (1872–1922), Austro-Hungarian politician (SDAPÖ)
- James D. Dotsch (1904–1986), American politician (Democrat)
- Rollie Dotsch (1933–1988), American football coach
