= Portrait of Stephan Geraedts, Husband of Isabella Coymans =

Painting by Frans Hals

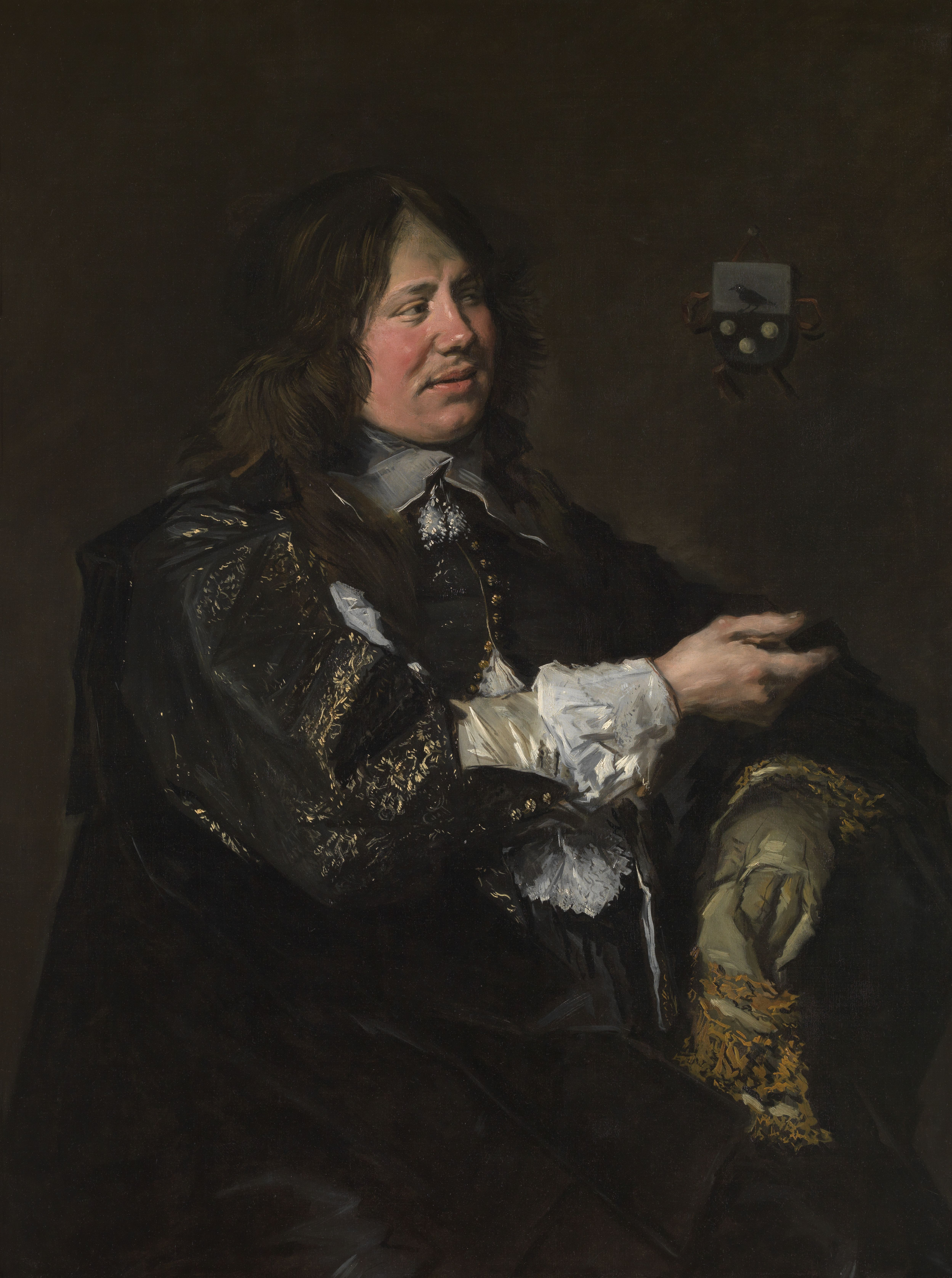
- Artist: Frans Hals
- Year: ca. 1650–1652
- Catalogue: 674
- Medium: Oil on canvas
- Dimensions: 115 cm × 87 cm (45 2/7 in × 34 2/5 in)
- Location: Royal Museum of Fine Arts Antwerp, Antwerp

Portrait of Stephan Geraedts, Husband of Isabella Coymans is a late oil on canvas painting by the Dutch Golden Age painter Frans Hals, made when the artist was about 70. The painting is one of a pendant pair of wedding portraits, now separated. Hals probably painted the present portrait, Stephanus Geraerdts', an alderman of Haarlem, which was designed to be on the left, and the accompanying portrait of his wife Isabella Coymans (right hand portrait) around 1650–1652, six or seven years after their marriage in 1644. Isabella's portrait is now in a private collection in Paris.

The portraits have been separated since 1886.

== Context ==
=== Frans Hals ===
The Hals family moved to Haarlem before the fall of Antwerp in 1585. This city welcomed skilled artisans and political refugees with open arms. Partly because of this, Haarlem grew into an economic and artistic center. The family of the Flemish textile worker Franchoys Hals and his wife included two important artists. They were Frans (Antwerp, 1582 - Haarlem 1666) and Dirk (Haarlem 1591 - Haarlem 1656).

There is much uncertainty about Frans Hals' first steps into the painting world. The second edition of Karel van Mander's Schilderboek from 1618 mentions him as a student of the latter. However, the style of his works leans towards Jacob Jordaens and Peter Paul Rubens, both Antwerpians, like Hals.

In 1610, Hals joined the Haarlem Guild of Saint Luke, a year later he produced his earliest known work, Jacobus Saffirus. This early work is characterized by a smooth brushwork, a faithful representation of his model and a spontaneous pose. He depicted the head vividly and strongly lit, something that is also reminiscent of Caravaggio. The painter's earliest style is characterized by a lively coloration, which later becomes more sober. He rather depicted his portraits static and frontal, against a dark golden brown or olive green background. Many of his subjects wear black clothing.

=== Importance ===
Perhaps the portrait of the alderman is Hals' only painting in Flanders. The Royal Museum of Fine Arts in Antwerp also considers it to be Hals' most valuable painting in the Low Countries. Because of the dark palette, the thin paint application, the broad and virtuoso brushwork, but also because of the psychological transparency, the portrait has a special artistic value. This value is augmented by the fact that the portrait of Stephanus Geraerdts holds a switching function within Hals' oeuvre. It is the starting point of Hals' mature painting style at the end of his career. In addition, the portrait provides insight into the self-image of the seventeenth-century elite.

=== Description ===
Stephanus Geraerdts, depicted seated, stretches out his arm with a smile. His smile is a snapshot that Hals probably painted directly on canvas with a brush; he left no preliminary studies. Arnold Houbraken wrote the following about this in his Groote Schouburgh der Nederlantsche Konstschilders en Schilderessen (1718-1721):

It is said that he had a habit of making his portraits bold and melting, and afterwards inserting the brush strokes therein, saying: Nu moet er het kennelyke van den meester noch in

If the twin portraits are placed side by side, it is striking that the alderman is smiling at his wife. He wants to accept the rose she offers him. The spectator witnesses a tension created by their smile and action. Since the works have been separated since 1886, the bond that held them together has broken.

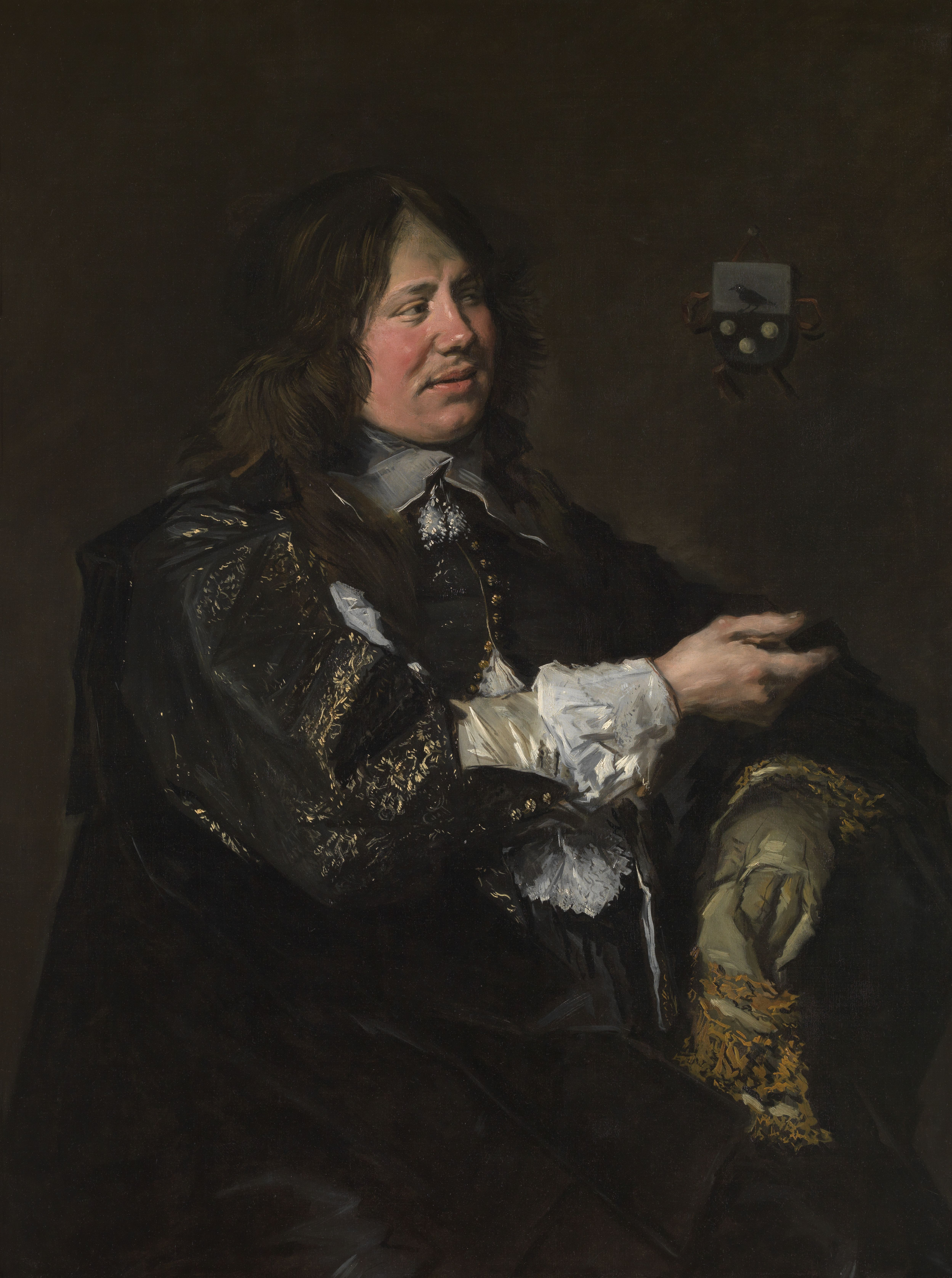
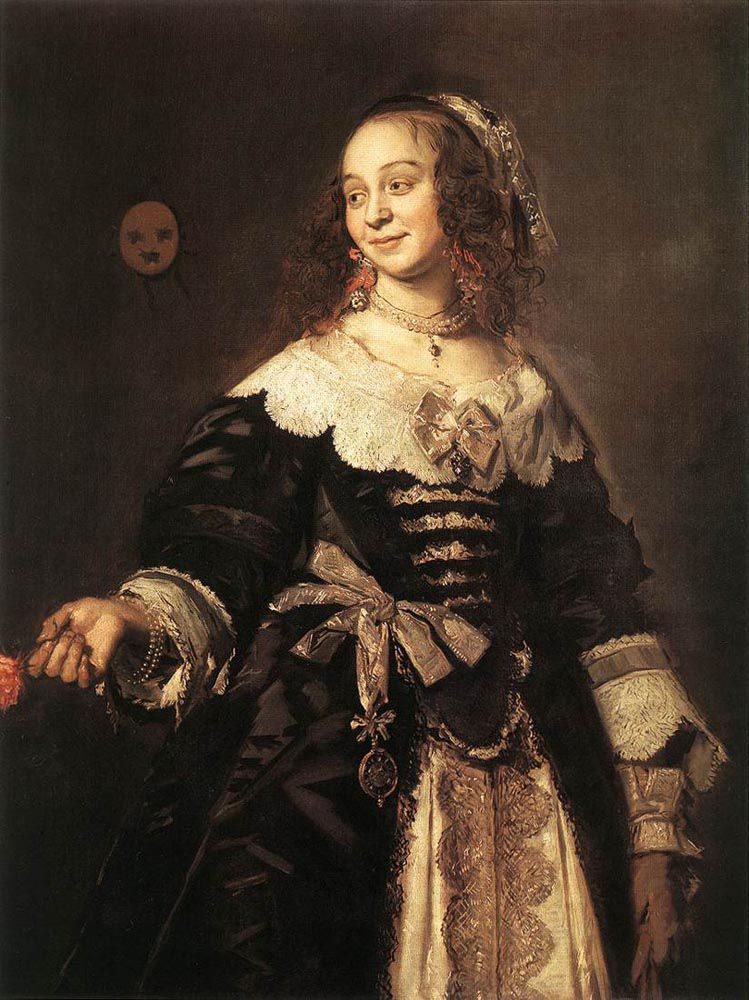
Isabella and Stephen, side by side

Hals portrayed his model in a very casual manner. Usually Dutch regents were portrayed much less spontaneously. However, the couple's gestures are conventional. They express the bond of their marriage, which was clearly a love one for them. As was customary, Hals portrayed the husband slightly larger and closer to the viewer than his wife.

Geraerdts' outstretched hand is more roughly worked out than the face, and contained in a sleeve that art historians consider to be virtuoso. Hals depicted quite realistically the deep black cloak with gold embroidery of the alderman via fast, straight, almost impressionistic brushstrokes. In earlier art historical research, this way of painting was sometimes compared with Manet's painting style, and it is a precursor to Hals's later portraits. The Regentesses is an example thereof. It gives a certain dynamism to the whole.

It is very clear from this portrait that Geraerdts is wealthy. In addition to the fact that Hals's portraits were costly, the alderman ostentatiously shows off his expensive clothing. His wife's is even more luxurious. She descended from one of the most wealthy merchant dynasties in Holland. At the time of their marriage, they lived in a house on the Keizersgracht in Geraerdts' hometown Amsterdam. He died in the latter city on January 27, 1671.

== See also ==
- List of paintings by Frans Hals
