= Henry Doetsch =

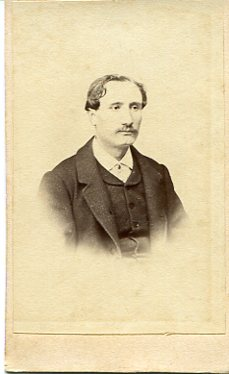
- Henry Doetsch, 1866
- Born: 31 January 1839
- Died: 25 May 1894 (aged 55)
- Occupation: Industrialist

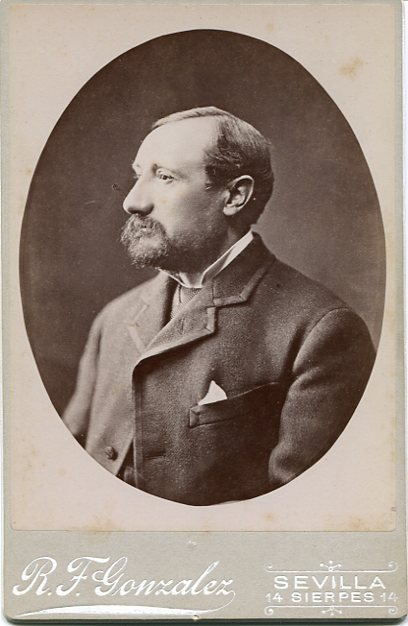
Henry Doetsch, Sevilla 1876

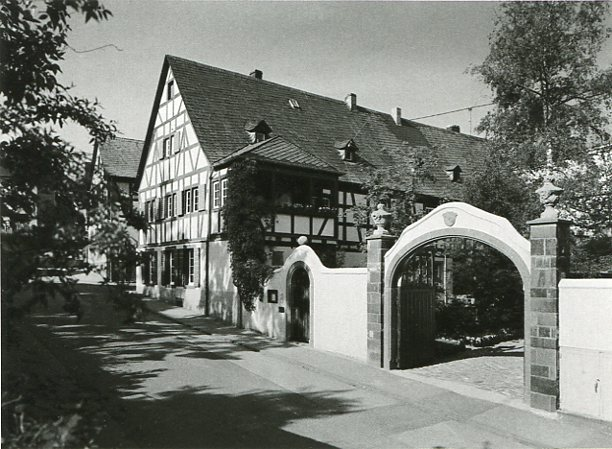
The Burghof (1654), manor of the Doetsch family in Kärlich

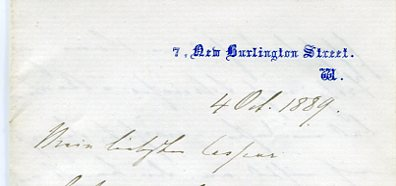
A letter to his brother Caspar Doetsch. From 7, New Burlington Street, London 1884

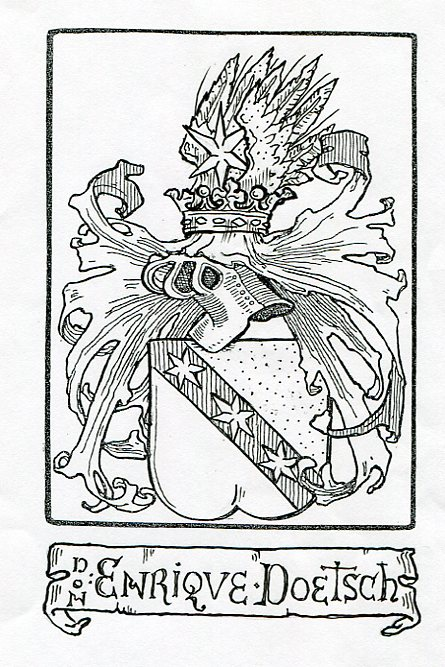
The arms of Enrique Doetsch

Henry Doetsch (31 January 1839 - 25 May 1894) was a German-born industrialist who lived in London.

He was born Heinrich Moritz Doetsch on 31 January 1839 at the "Burghof", the 17th-century manor of his family in Kärlich (Mülheim-Kärlich, Weißenthurm, Rheinland). Because of a lung weakness, Henry (Enrique) Doetsch went (after a short time in Liverpool) as a young man of 23 years to Sevilla in Spain, where he entered with the help of his cousin, Moritz Willmar-Doetsch from Frankfurt/Main, as volunteer a British company. A few years later he was founder of the Firma Sundheim y Doetsch in Huelva (1865) with his compagnon Guillermo Sundheim (1840 - 1903). In 1873 Doetsch was the director of the Rio Tinto Company Limited, (RTCL), (Minas de Río Tinto), in London and Huelva. Together with Hugh Matheson, chairman of the Rio Tinto Company, and Guillermo (Wilhelm) Sundheim he built up a railway line in Andalucia, the Compañía del Ferrocarril de Zafra a Huelva. Doetsch held a patent in Canada for an extraction process to remove copper from its ores, registered in September 1879, so he was involved in mining and production of copper in Río Tinto by the so-called Doetsch process. But the use of Teladas poisoned the air and many residents became ill or died. Henry Doetsch fell out with Hugh Matheson on the issue of supply of the Miners (Sundheim had left the RTCL in 1876). During an uprising of the miners in 1888 more than 100 civilians were killed by Spanish soldiers. Doetsch left Spain in autumn 1884, after he had invited his old friend Frederick Burnaby to spend a month at Huelva. A few weeks later Burnaby gave up all his engagements, and fared forth for the Soudan. The three times offered title of Marqués de Río Tinto by the Spanish King Alfonso XII refused Enrique Doetsch. He was awarded the grand cross of the Orden de Isabel la Católica. For many summertimes, Doetsch has been a traveling companion of the Infanta Maria de la Paz and the Infanta Eulalia of Spain. Henry Doetsch was succeeded at the Rio Tinto Group by his nephew Carlos Doetsch (1870 - 1951), who married in 1902 Justita Sundheim de la Cueva, daughter of Guillermo Sundheim and Justa de la Cueva y Camporedondo. The couple with the children Mercedes and Jorge lived in Huelva and Madrid.

In London Henry Doetsch lived as a respected financier at 7 New Burlington Street. A generous host and notorious bachelor, Doetsch opened his home and Art Gallery to an interested audience. Still in Spain Henry Doetsch started to collect pictures by old masters. Staying in contact with Bernard Berenson, masterpieces by great painters were gathered in the collection: Titian, Veronese, Guido Reni, Dolci, Lorenzo Lotto, Palma Vecchio, Pontormo, Bronzino, Andrea del Sarto, van Dyck, Rubens, Breughel, Rembrandt, Frans Hals, Wouwerman, Clouet and Holbein. Some of the paintings came from important galleries: Orléans-Galliera, Palazzo Vendramin (Henri Duc de Bordeaux), The Collection King Charles I, Pinacotece Lochis, or from private collections as those of the Duke of Roxburghe, the Marquis of Donegall or Conte Alborghetti. Doetsch's evenings at New Burlington Street were famous: Among his guests the Prince of Wales (Edward VII), Lord Rosebery and his friend Colonel Burnaby. Doetsch was a lover of black Havana cigars; he died of pneumonia on 25 May 1894 in London.

After Doetsch's death in 1894, on 22nd, 24th and 25 June 1895, his pictures of Old Masters were auctioned by Christie's (Messrs. Christie, Manson and Woods), at their offices and sale rooms at 8 King Street, St. James's Square, and the sale appears to have been an enormous success. Some fine examples of paintings are now owned by H. M. the Queen and the House of Hesse at Kronberg. Henry Doetsch's career appears to have mirrored that of his countryman, Ludwig Mond, but Dr. Mond is remembered through the company that bears his name (Brunner-Mond) and the Mond Room at the National Gallery in London; Doetsch is largely forgotten. An Illustrated Catalogue of the Doetsch-Collection was prepared for Victoria, Empress Frederick (1895).
