= Claus Grimm =

German art historian

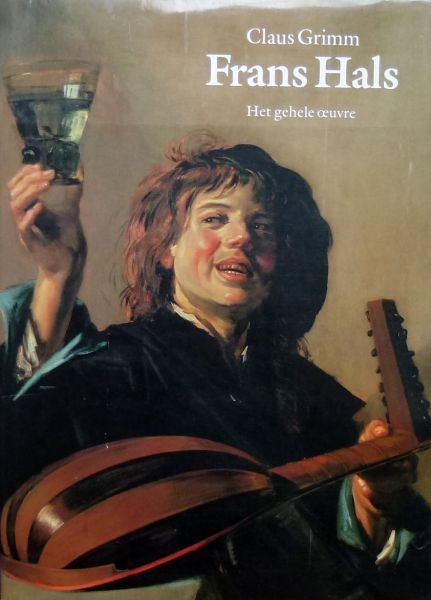
Cover of Dutch translation of his 1989 work on Frans Hals

Claus Grimm (born November 22, 1940) is a German art historian and from its founding in 1983 until 2007 he was director of the Bavarian historical institute Haus der Bayerischen Geschichte in Augsburg. He is considered an authority on Frans Hals and wrote a catalogue raisonné in 1989.
