= Philips Angel =

Philips Angel can refer to:

- Philips Angel I (1616 – after 1683), Dutch still life painter
- Philips Angel II (c. 1618 – after 1664), Dutch painter, etcher, writer and colonial administrator
