= Haarlem Guild of St. Luke =

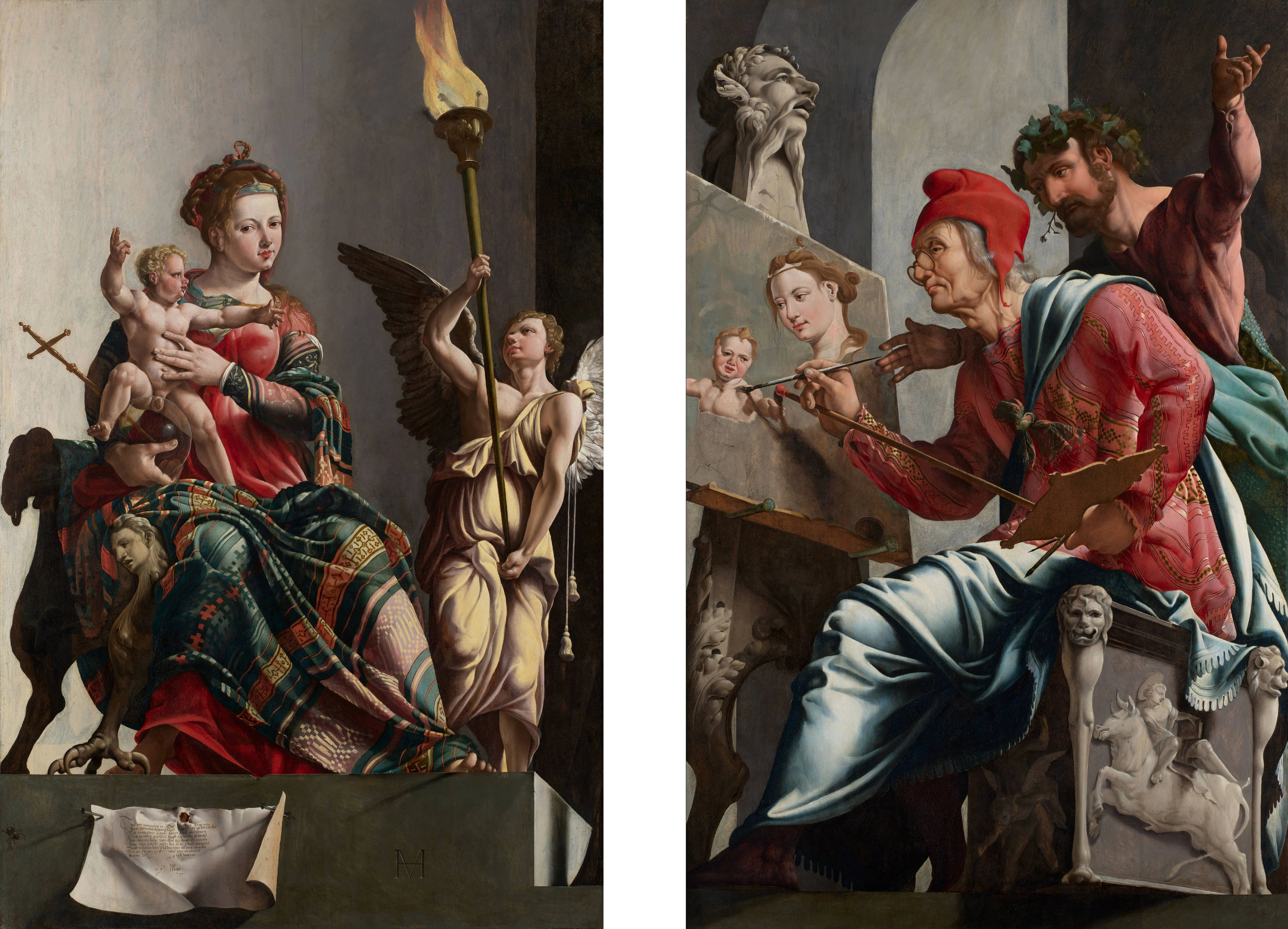
Maarten van Heemskerck painted this diptych before he left Haarlem for Italy in 1532.

The Haarlem Guild of Saint Luke was first a Christian, and later a city Guild for various trades falling under the patron saints Luke the Evangelist and Saint Eligius.

== History ==
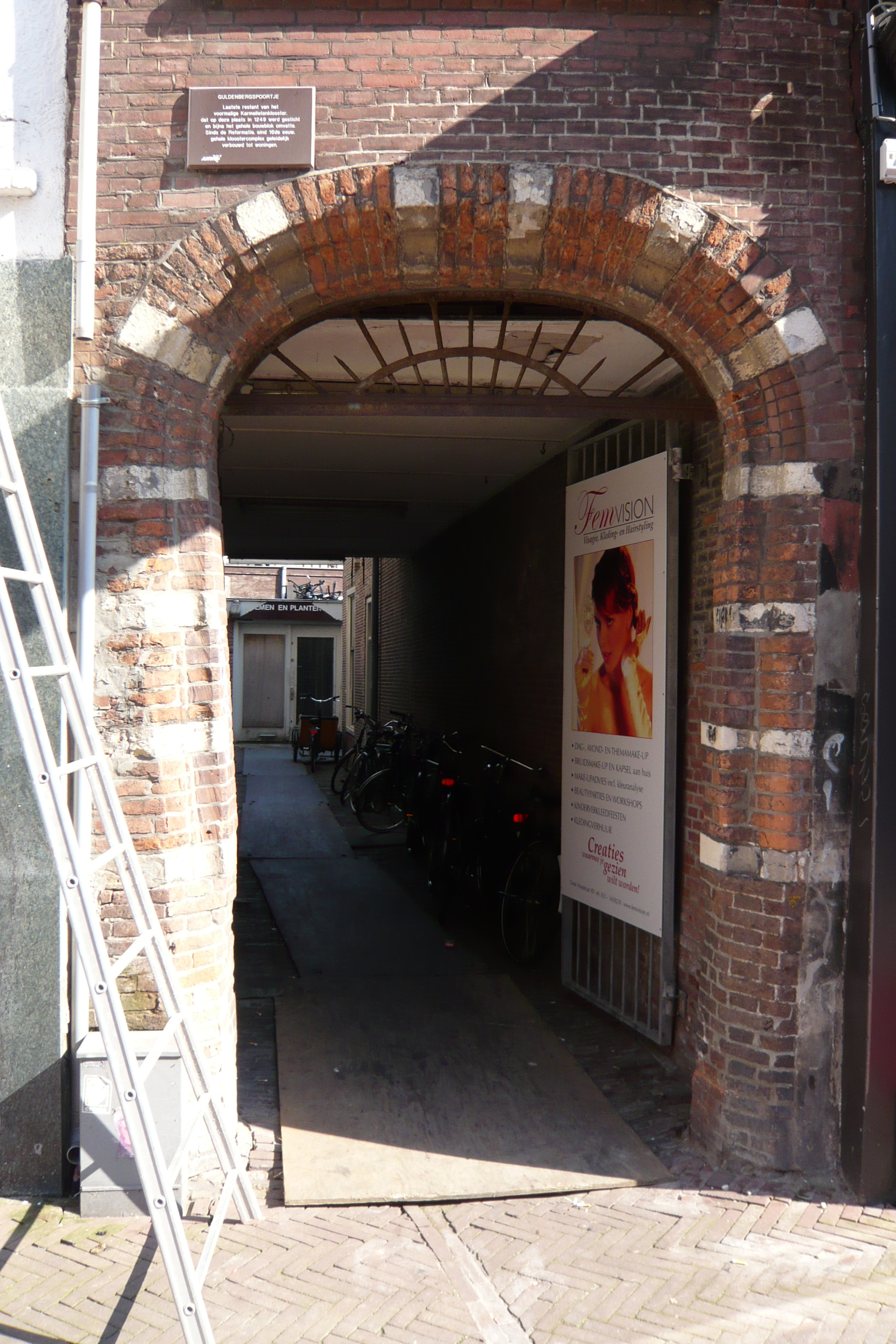
Doorway to the original monastery of the Carmelites and the Vrouwebroerskerk. Called the Guldenbergspoortje or Golden mountain gate in the Grote Houtstraat.

During the lifetime of Geertgen tot Sint Jans, there was probably a painter's guild in Haarlem, but all records of such an organization have been lost. If one existed, it would probably have been associated with the Janskerk (Haarlem), where Geertgen was active as a respected painter. The earliest mention of the Haarlem Guild of St. Luke is from 1496, when the heirs of Joost Huge Alboutsdr, who had been the former owner of the location of the altar in the Sint-Bavokerk, ceded all altar rights which up to then had been for the Ascension of the Virgin, to the Guild of St. Luke and St. Eligius. This is possibly also the year that the Guild switched its altar from the Janskerk to the Bavokerk. The guild was for painters and gold- and silversmiths, with St. Luke being the patron saint of the painters, and St. Eligius being the patron saint for the smiths.

=== Earliest charter ===
The earliest charter for the guild no longer exists, but the earliest one still in the archives is from 1514. That charter remained in effect until the beeldenstorm, whereupon the guild altar found temporary housing in the Vrouwenbroerskerk, since the Bavokerk had become Protestant and all the guilds had left the church. The Vrouwenbroerskerk was the church of the Carmelites, whose monastery is gone, but whose archives survive today. Of the original complex, only the entrance gate still stands on the Grote Houtstraat. These archives recorded that a kessophel (chasuble) was donated to this altar in 1575 by Elisabeth van Dorp. After Haarlem lost the Siege of Haarlem in 1573, it became a Catholic enclave that officially fell under the rule of Philip II of Spain. It wasn't until 1577 that the local bishop Godfried van Mierlo set his seal to the Satisfactie van Haarlem wherein he promised to swear allegiance to Willem the Silent rather than Philip II, on the condition that the Catholics would keep the same rights as Protestants. Though Haarlem, like Amsterdam with its Alteratie, reverted the Catholic rights of this Satisfactie a year later, it was this special Catholic-friendly reputation that attracted many from the south that added to the city's wealth in its golden age.

In 1576, a decision was made on September 28 to make a devotional piece for St. Eligius, since only St. Luke was now represented. This referred to the painting by Martin van Heemskerck, which does not display St. Eligius, but shows St. Luke painting the Virgin. This painting was quite large, and though it shows a pottery (faience) baker as St. Luke and sculptures and woodcarvings abound in it, there is no sign of any smith work in it. The signed paper attached at the bottom of the painting is recorded by Karel van Mander and states that Heemskerck painted it for his colleagues in the guild. Heemskerk had painted this before he traveled to Italy, and when he came back he became charter master of the guild from 1550-1552. Apparently the smiths were dissatisfied with their representation in the running of the guild, and this caused a guild dispute, because the goldsmiths broke away into their own guild in 1576, only to return in the charter of 1590.

=== Charter of 1590 ===
After the Siege of Antwerp in 1585, many families fled north and since Antwerp was a major center for painting, the Haarlem market was flooded with professional painters who competed with Haarlem's own craftsmen. To protect the market, a new charter was issued in 1590. That this was necessary is evidenced by the fact that new charters were issued soon after the beeldenstorm in most Dutch cities that had converted to Protestantism and were embroiled in the Eighty Years' War.

== Some guild membership grants after the Reformation ==
- 1593: Cornelis Engelsz, (father of Johannes Cornelisz Verspronck)
- 1597: Cornelis Claesz van Wieringen
- 1600: Frans Pietersz de Grebber, (father of the painters Pieter, Maria, and Albert)
- 1610: Frans Hals, (father of the painters Harmen, Frans (the Younger), Reynier, and Nicolaes), Floris Claesz van Dijck
- 1612: Willem Buytewech, Esaias van de Velde, Hercules Seghers
- 1613: Jan van de Velde
- 1614: Jacob van Campen
- 1616: Pieter de Molyn
- 1617: Jan van Goyen
- 1623: Salomon van Ruysdael, Pieter Saenredam, Pieter Post, Hans Bollongier, Johannes Bosschaert
- 1628: Pieter Soutman, Jan Matham (son of Jacob Matham), Jan Wils
- 1630: Salomon de Bray, (father of the painters Jan, Dirck, and Jozef)
- 1631: Willem de Poorter, Willem Claeszoon Heda, Sara van Baalbergen
- 1632: Jan Cornelisz Verspronck, Pieter de Grebber, Jan Coelenbier, Pieter van Berendrecht, Johannes Berendrecht
- 1633: Judith Leyster
- 1634: Adriaen van Ostade
- 1636: Jacob Duck
- 1639: Philips Angel, Floris van Schooten
- 1640: Philips Wouwerman
- 1642: Nicolaes Berchem (as Claes Pietersen, son of Pieter Claesz), Barent Gael
- 1643: Isaac van Ostade, Gerrit Claesz Bleker, Cornelis Gerritsz Decker
- 1644: Claes van Beresteyn,
- 1645: Pieter Cornelisz Verbeeck
- 1646: Pieter Wouwerman, Frans Post, Guillam Dubois
- 1647: Hendrick Mommers
- 1649: Vincent van der Vinne
- 1651: Caesar van Everdingen
- 1653: Cornelis Visscher
- 1654: Cornelis Pietersz Bega, Job Adriaensz Berckheyde
- 1655: Jan Wouwerman
- 1659: Josua de Grave
- 1660: Gerrit Adriaenszoon Berckheyde, Isaak van Nickelen
- 1661: Jan Steen, Cornelis Beelt Isaack Vermeer
- 1662: Reyer van Blommendael
- 1663: Edwaert Collier
- 1664: Jacob Salomonsz van Ruysdael, Jan de Bray Thomas Heeremans
- 1666: Pieter Fris
- 1667: Jan de Bray
- 1669: Jacob van Huchtenburg
- 1670: Jan van Huchtenburg
- 1671: Dirck de Bray
- 1678: Dirk Maas
- 1679: Cornelis Dusart
- 1688: Jan van Nickelen
- 1706: Frans Decker

== Loss of the St. Luke relic ==
In 1517 a relic of St. Luke had been donated for the altar by the painter Barthel Pons, who had gotten it from the cardinal Christoforo da Forli (with the additional title S. Maria Aracoeli). This relic was accompanied by an indulgence of 100 days to whoever would say their Paternoster and Ava maria at the altar. Apparently Pieter Fransz de Grebber gave this relic to the Franciscan friar Joannes Cloribus van Brugge in 1627 for safekeeping. In 1632 the St. Lucas guild masters were very upset about this and Salomon de Bray tried to get it back, but to no avail. In 1641 they tried once again to get the relic back, but it seems to have disappeared.

== The failed Charter of 1631 ==
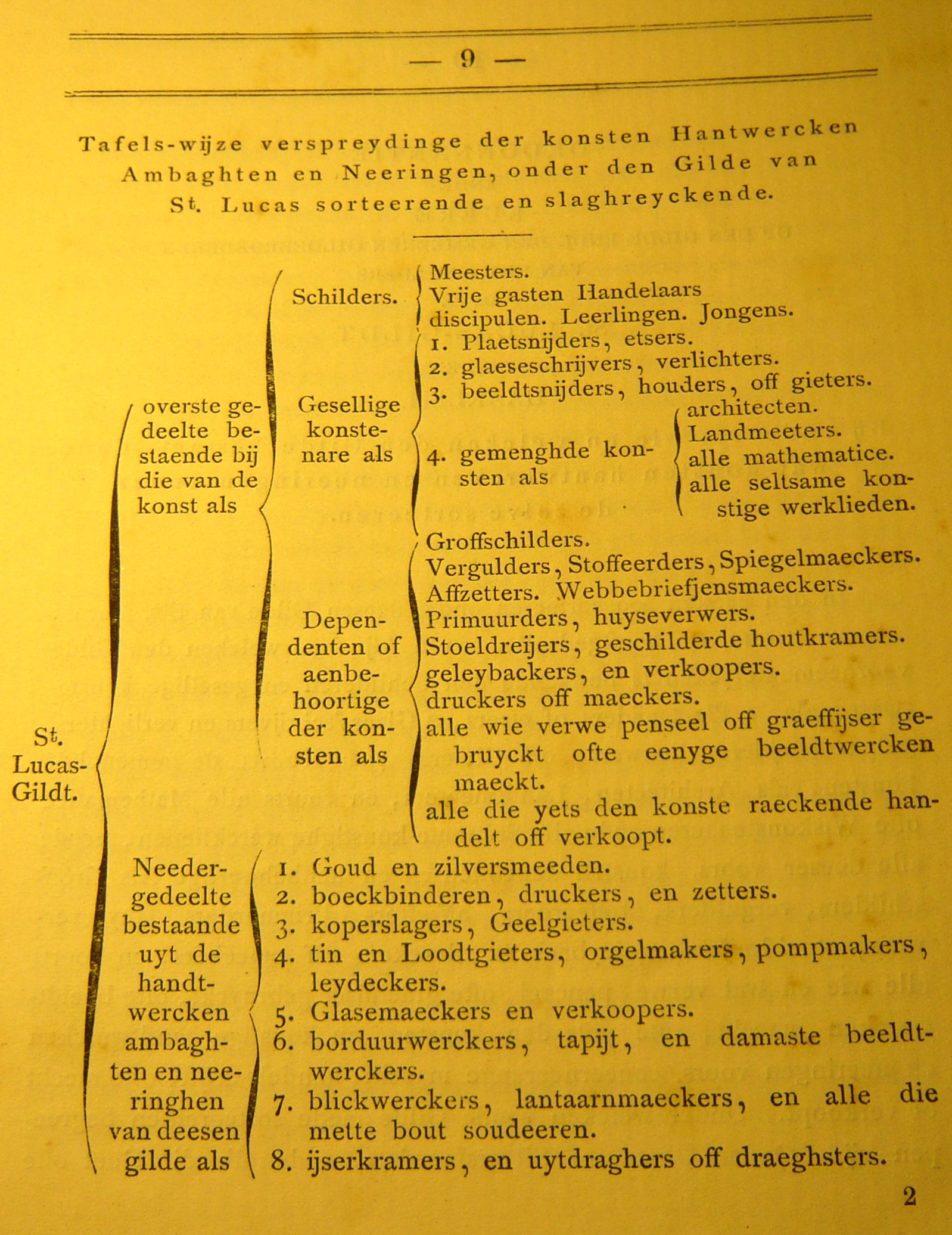
Transcription of Salomon de Bray's proposed hierarchy of the guild in 1631.

The immigration of Flemish painters after the fall of Antwerp in 1585 added a great deal to the painting community of Haarlem and artistically the city flourished, with an astounding production of oil paintings. Between 1605 and 1635 over 100,000 paintings were produced in Haarlem. The competition for commissions was very high, however, and the 1590 charter was apparently not considered protective enough. In 1631 a new charter was released again, and this charter is so detailed that it tells us much more about the art of painting and art dealing than it does about the artists themselves. It was prepared by Salomon de Bray, and he described a hierarchy of guild members that apparently met with a lot of opposition. His first petition to pass this charter was denied with the remark that it was too long, and the second attempt was not passed at all. Essentially the charter of 1590 held up until the guild was dissolved altogether in 1795 by Napoleonic decree.

=== The Guild masters in 1631 ===
In the introduction to the charter of 1631, the guildmasters present their proposal of the charter to the city fathers. The signers of this proposal were Pieter de Molijn, Outgert Ariss Akersloot, Willem Claesz Heda, Salomon de Bray, Cornelis Cornelisz, Cornelis Claesz van Wieringen, Floris van Dyck, and Isaak Halinck.

Proposed guild hierarchy in the failed Charter of 1631
St. Luke Guild	Artists	Painters:	Masters.
St. Luke Guild	Artists	Painters:	Art dealers, students, boys
St. Luke Guild	Artists	Craftsmen:	Etchers, glass-cutters, sculptors, carvers, metal-workers.
St. Luke Guild	Artists	Craftsmen:	Architects, surveyors, mathematicians, rare arts.
St. Luke Guild	Dependents:	Rough painters, plate-makers, mirror-makers, house-painters.	Other arts:
St. Luke Guild	Dependents:	Rough painters, plate-makers, mirror-makers, house-painters.	Printers, pottery bakers, shriners, paint-mixers, engravers.
St. Luke Guild	Dependents:	Lower handicrafts:	Gold- & Silversmiths, book-binders, copper-, brass-, tin- and lead workers, plumbers, and roof tilers.
St. Luke Guild	Dependents:	Lower handicrafts:	Glass-makers, embroiderers, carpet-makers, weavers, lantern-makers & solderers.

== Legacy ==
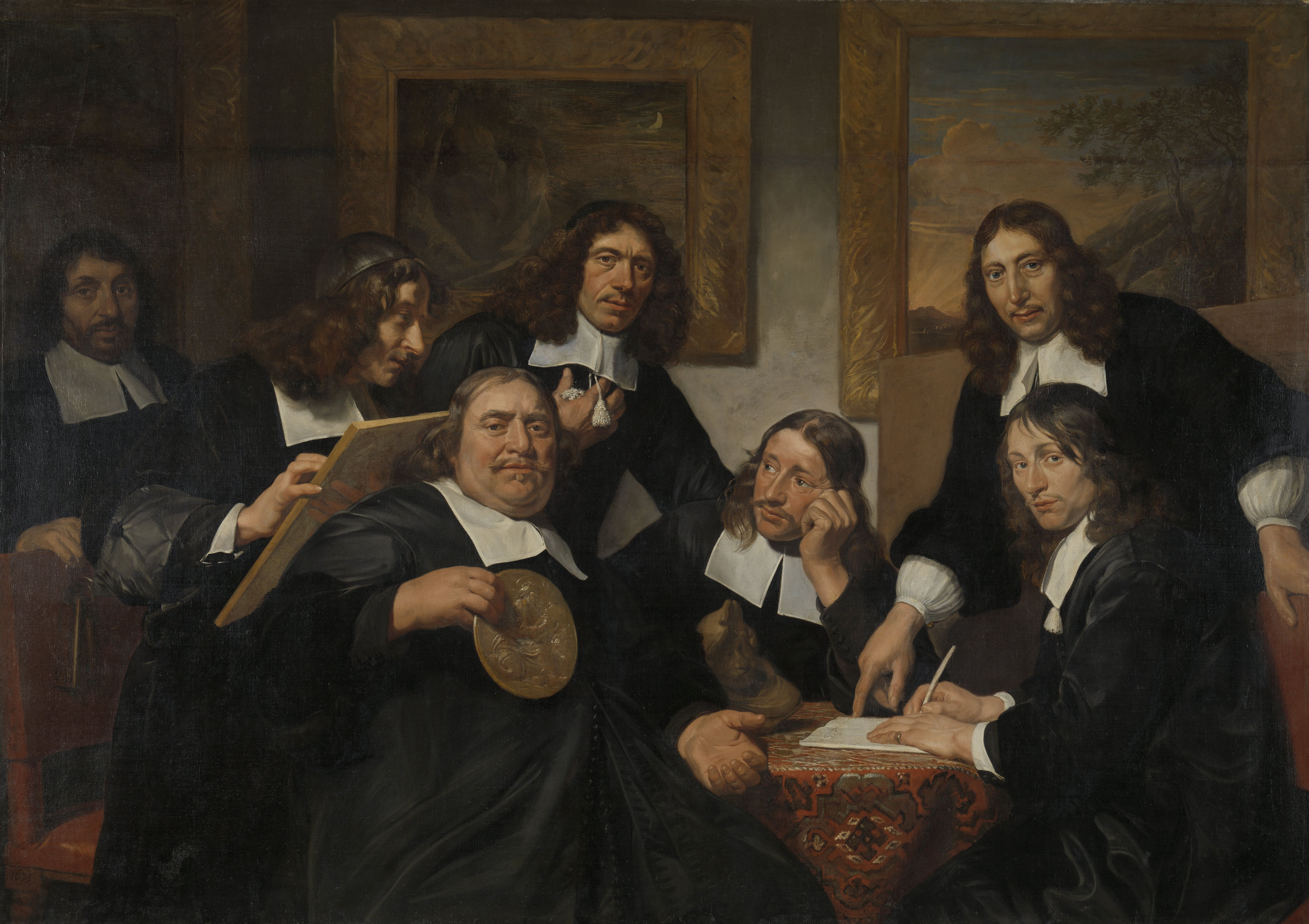
The Governors of the Haarlem Guild of St Luke in 1675. Salomon's son Jan de Bray painted himself second from the left.

Unfortunately the Haarlem St Lucasgilde archives fell into disarray between the period that the guilds were dissolved in Haarlem (1795) and 1860. Through the years historians have attempted to make lists of archival records, using the personal archives of the de Bray family (most notably from Salomon de Bray in the 1630s) and the van der Vinne family (most notably Vincent Laurensz van der Vinne from the 1650s) and thanks mostly to the efforts of Adriaan van der Willigen Pz. in 1866 and 1870. A recent inventory by Hessel Miedema has helped to give insight into the remains, while the Haarlem archives have been able to buy back lost records from enthusiastic researchers of the 19th century who never returned borrowed materials.
