= Jan Hals =

Dutch Golden Age painter (1620–1654)

Jan Hals (1620, Haarlem – 1654, Haarlem) was a Dutch Golden Age painter.

== Biography ==
According to Houbraken he was the son of the painter Frans Hals and was like his brothers Harmen and Frans II, good at music and painting. He was a member of the Haarlem Guild of St. Luke. He had two children, Jan Jansz and Klaas, of whom one was still alive when Houbraken was writing. Houbraken claimed the son who was still alive (at the time he was writing, c. 1704–1710) had emigrated to the East Indies where he lived with a mestizo whom he married for her money, in a house filled with paintings "in the Dutch manner". Houbraken heard this story from J. Wieland, an elderly art collector who had known the family.

According to the RKD he was the son of Frans Hals and his second wife, Lysbeth Reyniersdr. He was the half-brother of Harmen and Frans II, and the full brother of Reynier and Nicolaes. He was the brother-in-law of Pieter Gerritsz van Roestraten. He had the bentname "De Gulden Esel" (the golden easel), but he is not recorded in Italy, so it is difficult to understand how he came to join the Bentvueghels. He married in 1648 but his wife died only 6 months later. He married a second time to Sara Gerritsdr in 1649, but they appear to both be dead by 1654, when two sons are sent to the orphanage. He is known for portraits and scenes of daily life.
