= Frans Rijckhals =

Dutch painter and designer

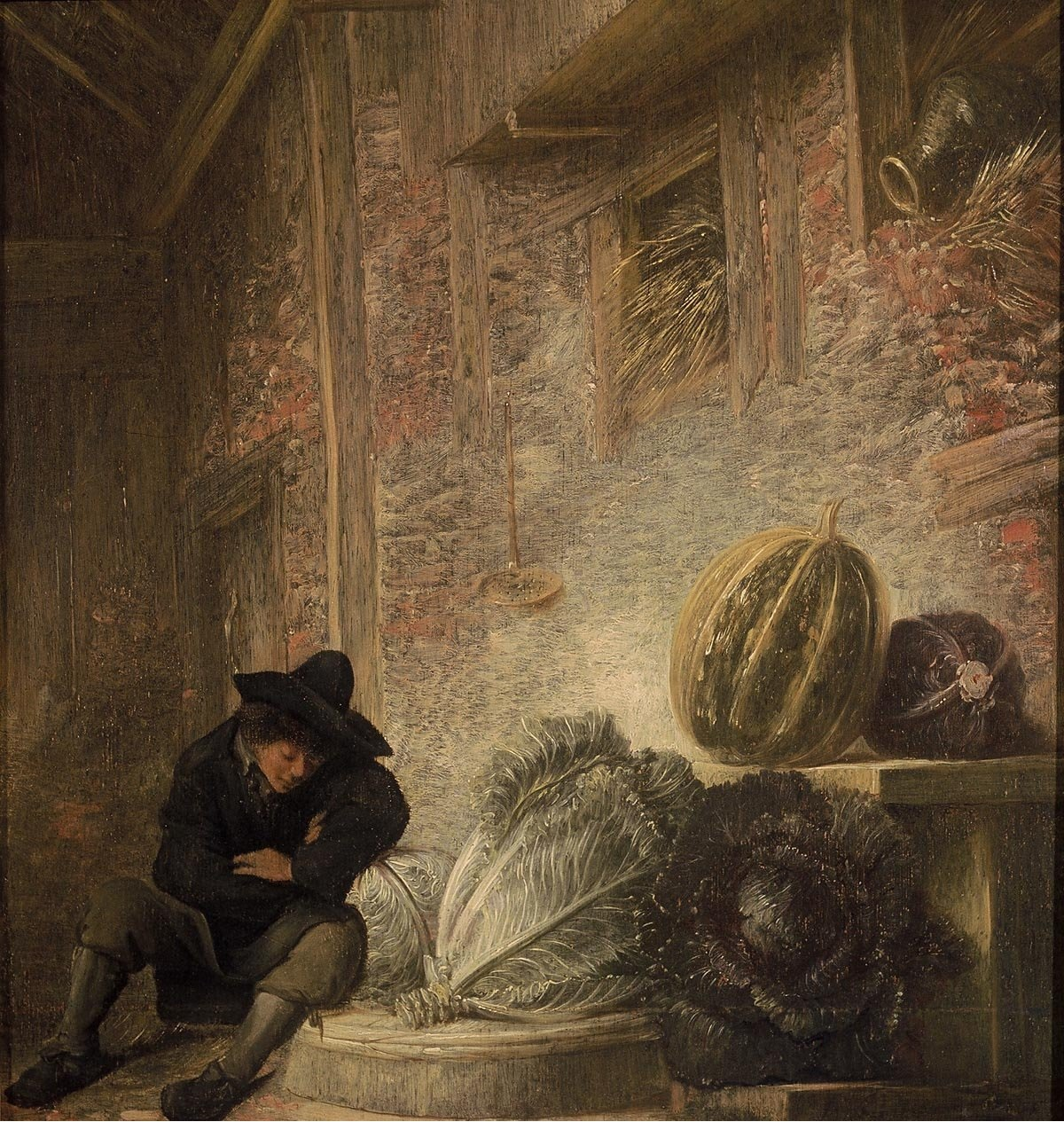
Boy Sleeping in a Barn

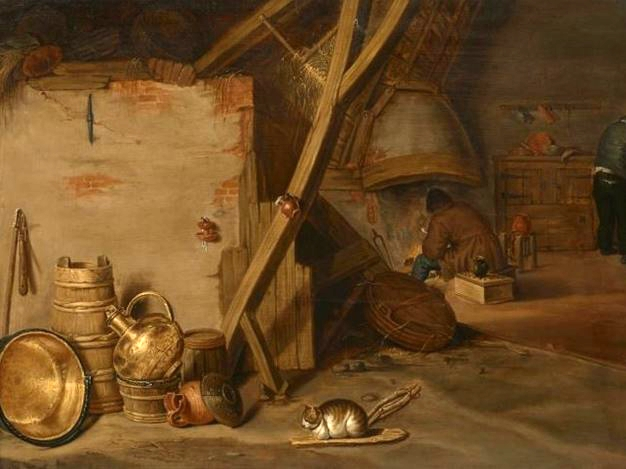
Rustic Interior with Coppers

Frans Rijckhals, or François Ryckhals (3 May 1609, Middelburg - 29 July 1647, Middelburg) was a Dutch painter and designer. His works combine genre scenes with still-lifes.

== Biography ==
He was probably a pupil of Pieter de Bloot. After working in his hometown, he went to Dordrecht from 1633 to 1634. He returned to Middelburg in 1638 and lived there until his death. In 1640, he and David Teniers the Younger worked together on a painting in Antwerp.

In 1642, he married the Burgomasters daughter and moved into their home, which is now a museum dedicated to him.

He was primarily known for his paintings of rural life, but also produced Italian-style landscapes and religious works. At the beginning of his career, he also painted animals. A large number of his works in Berlin, Saint Petersburg and Budapest were destroyed during World War II. Only twenty of his works are known to exist. These may seen at (among others) the Musée des Beaux-Arts de Dunkerque, the National Museum, Warsaw and the Musée Fabre in Montpellier.

He was a follower of Willem Buytewech and Aelbert Cuyp and was influenced by Adriaen van de Venne. In turn, he influenced Philips Angel I. Some of his still-lifes were attributed to Frans Hals the Younger, due to a mistaken interpretation of his convoluted monogram. In fact, no works by Hals have been identified with any certainty.

Among his pupils were Laurens Bernards (c.1630-1676) and, possibly, Willem Kalf.
