= Reynier Hals =

Dutch Golden Age painter

Reynier Hals (1627, Haarlem – 1672, Haarlem), was a Dutch Golden Age painter.

== Biography ==
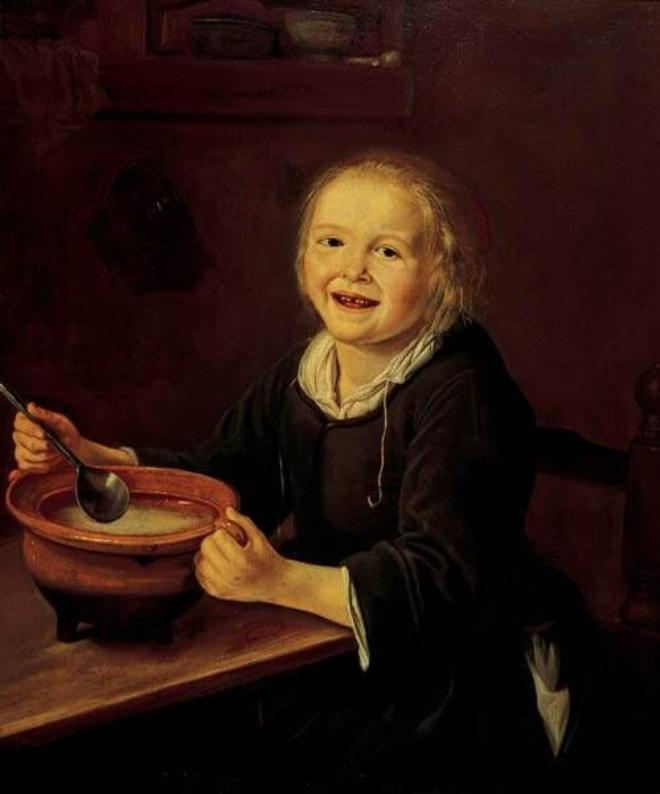
Boy eating porridge

According to Houbraken, who did not mention him specifically as one of the sons of the painter Frans Hals, he was, like his brothers Harmen, Frans II, and Jan, good at music and painting.

According to the RKD he was the son of Frans Hals and his second wife, who when he grew up, appears to have moved to Amsterdam when he married in 1653. He married a second time in 1657 in The Hague, but is registered as living in Amsterdam the rest of his life. In 1659 he was a witness to the betrothal of the painter Roelof Jansz van Vries. He is known for genre works.
