= Jan Wils (painter) =

Dutch Golden Age painter

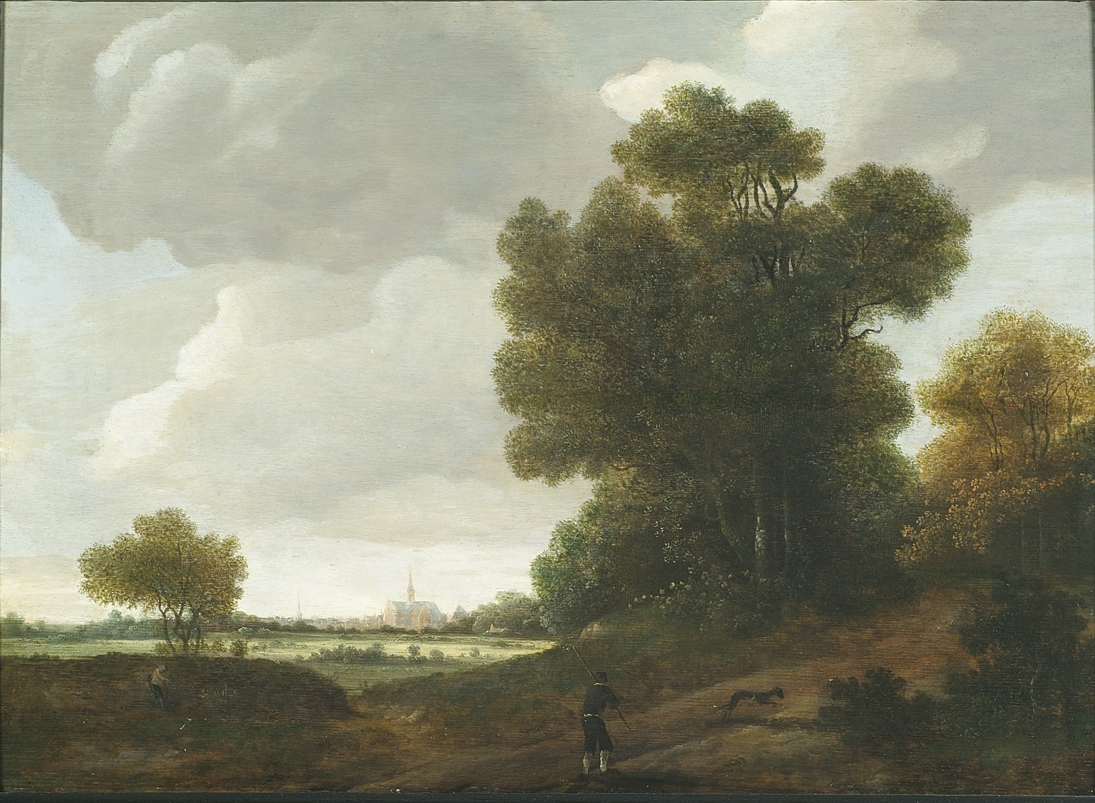
Landscape with Haarlem St. Bavochurch in the background, 1644

Jan Wils (1603–1666) was a Dutch Golden Age painter.

== Biography ==
Wils was born in Amsterdam. According to Houbraken he was one of a group of teachers of Nicolaes Berchem, along with Berchem's father Pieter Klaaze (a "gemeen" or common painter), Jan van Goijen, Klaas Mojaart, Pieter Fransze Grebber, and Berchem's cousin Giov. Babtist Weeninx. Jan Wils' daughter married Berchem, and when she heard nothing from his studio upstairs, she would bang on the ceiling with a mop to wake him up, assuming he had fallen asleep at his easel.

According to the RKD he was baptized on June 15, 1603 in the Nieuwe Kerk and was buried there 22 October 1666. In between he spent time in Haarlem and in Italy. In 1628 he registered both as a member of the Haarlem schutterij and the Haarlem Guild of St. Luke. In 1634 he is registered in the Haarlem guild as an art dealer. He travelled to France and Italy in 1654–56 and in 1655 he travelled to Lyons from Rome with Dirck Helmbreeker. He had been a pupil of Pieter de Molijn and is known for Italianate landscapes. He died in Haarlem.
