= Willem Kalf =

Dutch still-life painter (1619–1693)

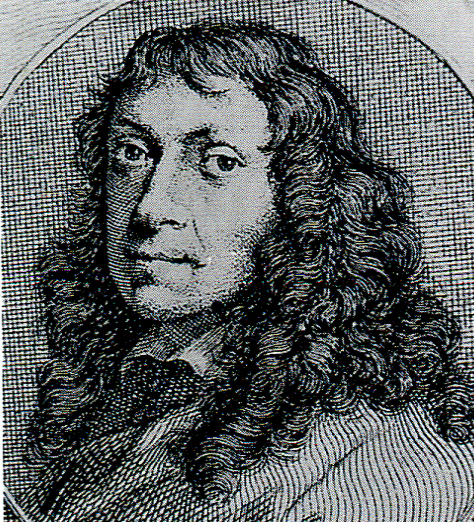
- Born: 1619; Rotterdam
- Died: 31 July 1693 (aged 73–74); Amsterdam, Netherlands
- Known for: Still-life paintings
- Movement: Dutch Golden Age

Willem Kalf (1619 – 31 July 1693) was one of the most prominent Dutch still-life painters of the 17th century, the Dutch Golden Age. We first get acquainted with Willem Kalf through Arnold Houbraken, in his Groot Schilderboek, who speaks very highly of him. In fact, Kalf was a highly regarded and celebrated artist during his own lifetime. This was due to his extensive art knowledge and what we gain from Houbraken, his affable personality. His claim to fame now rests mostly on his mature still lifes, pronkstilleven in Dutch, which feature the most exotic and luxurious objects. This can be seen in for example, Still life with nautilus beaker and porcelain lidded bowl from 1662, which became an iconic piece of western art.

== Life ==
There is little known about Willem Kalf's life, for there is minimal documentation on Kalf himself. What is known is mainly derived from archival research, documents, and other sources which link him to specific times, places, and people, but there are no direct writings on him, except Houbraken and a small piece by Gerard de Lairesse.

=== Early life ===
Willem Kalf was born in Rotterdam in a house at the Hoogstraat, in 1619. He was baptized the same year in the church of Saint Lawrence. He was the son of Machtelt Gerrits and Jan Jansz. Kalf, a wealthy cloth merchant and member of the Rotterdam council who, just before he died in 1625, got caught in a scandal. Willem Kalf was only six years old at the time his father died. He remained in Rotterdam with his mother and started showing interest in painting when he was roughly 18 years old. His mother died shortly after that in 1638, after which Willem left his hometown for The Hague before he moved to Paris around 1641.

=== Paris ===
After his apprenticeship in the Netherlands, Willem Kalf moved to Paris around 1641, to the circle of the Flemish artists in Saint-Germain-des-Prés, where he presumably remained until the autumn of 1646. Here he mainly painted French Interiors, small kitchens, and barns. This is where Kalf's earliest period begins, usually called his French or Parisian period. Proof for Kalf's stay in Paris was given by Van Gelder, in an episode in the life history of the Antwerp resident Philips Vleugels, written down by his son Nicolaas and kept in the library of the École des Beaux-Arts in Paris. Nicolaas writes about Vleugels first meeting with Kalf and various other artists who were living in a house called La Chasse, at the other end of la rue du Sépulcre joining la rue du Four; Nicolaas describes it as the "kind of refuge for painters from his country." He continues, "Most of these painters who were there were skilful; there was Nicasius, Van Boucle, Fouquiers, Calf, etc."

Kalf's farm interiors were very popular among his fellow artists and he was therefore often copied, not just in the 17th century. Kalf's interiors were highly priced in France well into the 18th century. Painters such as Lancret, Chardin, and François Boucher owned his paintings and even reworked some of them. For example, Kalf's painting, Interior of a rustic kitchen (1642–1643), now located in the Louvre, was once acquired by François Boucher (1703–1770) during his trip to the Netherlands in 1766.

The fact that Willem Kalf acquired great fame in Paris was not only due to the enormous amount of genre scenes he painted. While he was working in Paris, Kalf developed a new genre of painting that would soon gain popularity not only within France; his still-life paintings.

=== Return to the Netherlands ===
In October 1646 Kalf had returned to Rotterdam, but he did not stay there, because 5 years later his name appears in the marriage book for the city of Hoorn. The book shows that on October 22, 1651, Willem Janszoon Kalf, young companion from Rotterdam, and Cornelia Pluvier, young daughter of Vollenhoven, came to be married. The couple's marriage was celebrated by a verse by Vondel; his poem includes a brief description of Kalf's pronk still life paintings. Cornelia Pluvier was a very charming poet, calligrapher and engraver of glass. Her charms caught the attention of Constantijn Huygens, the stadholders secretary, who owned one of her engraved roemers.

Apart from his marriage to Cornelia, it appears surprising a painter such as Willem Kalf would have established himself in Hoorn for there was no other well-known colleague situated there, apart from Jacob Waben with whose work that of Kalf certainly has no connection. It is also soon after his marriage that Willem van Kalf, together with his wife, moves to Amsterdam where he and his wife would have 4 children. He would remain in Amsterdam until his death in 1693.

=== Final years in Amsterdam ===
A notarial document, in which Kalf places the authenticity of a painting by Paulus Bril, locates Kalf in Amsterdam in 1653. And in 1654, not long after his marriage, Willem Kalf is mentioned as a member of the Saint Luke's Guild in Amsterdam.

Amsterdam was a thriving city, filled with painters, art dealers, and buyers at the time Willem Kalf came to live there. It is not strange that after his arrival in Amsterdam, Willem Kalf came in contact with various art dealers. Though, Kalf was probably already getting acquainted with art dealers and art trade during his time in Saint Germain-des-Prés. Here he interacted with art merchants such as Picart and Goetkindt as we learn from Vleugels first visit to Paris. It was Kalf who, for example, introduced Vleugel to Picart. Nicolaas writes that Kalf took Vleugel "to a man named Picard, also Flemish, who lived where M. Hérault has since been seen to live, opposite the Bronze Horse. He was a painter of flowers, but he was more of a merchant than a painter, and kept young people making copies or doing other works; because it was to him most of the time that we addressed ourselves when we had work to do."

Sources, such as Houbraken, indicate that Kalf's contact with these art dealers was not to sell his art. There are numerous documents describing his involvement in painting expertise, indicating that he may have belonged to those numerous art dealers who were established in Amsterdam during the Dutch Golden Age. For example, as early as 1653, he was one of the experts to assess a painting by Paul Brit which was offered for sale by the Delft merchant Abraham van de Cooge. Another example is given by Bredius, who mentions that In 1686, together with the painters Job and Gerrit Berckheyde, Kalf gave evidence as an expert for a supposed Titian representing the "Matres."

As for his paintings, it is in Amsterdam Kalf began his mature period, pronkstilleven. It has been suggested that through his art dealership he acquired a broad collection of expensive and exotic objects which he then used in his still lifes. Though this is now seen as the highlight of his painting career, Kalf painted very little during his mature period. It has even often been suggested that Kalf completely stopped painting after 1680, which is the date of his last still life, Still life with Holbein bowl and silver ewer, now located in the museum of Schloss Weimar. Willem Kalf died on July 31, 1693. Houbraken wrote that Kalf that day went to an art sale in the Heerenlogement and afterward visited his friend Jan Pietersz Zomer, who was an art dealer himself. He went home but tripped on the Bantemer Brug. Though he was in a lot of pain, he managed to go home. Willem Kalf went to bed only to die at ten o'clock that night.

== Works and style ==
=== French period (1638–1646) ===
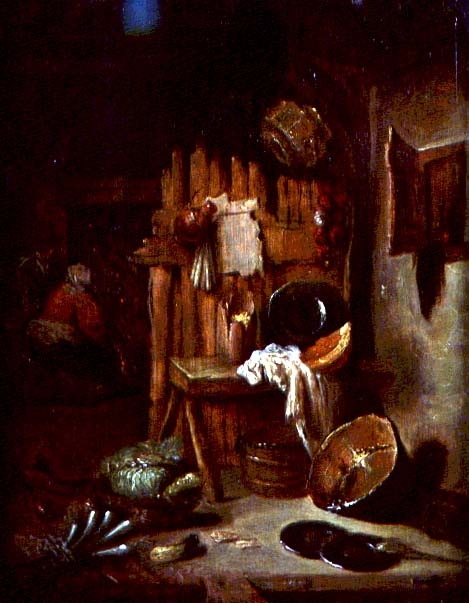
Willem Kalf Bauerninterieur circa 1640–1645

In Paris he painted mainly small-scale rustic interiors and still lifes. Kalf's rustic interiors are typically dominated by groups of vegetables, buckets, pots and pans, which he arranged as a still life in the foreground (e.g. Kitchen Still life, Dresden, Gemäldegal; Alte Meister). The paintings are identified as being distinctively non-Dutch due to certain vegetables (garlic and pumpkin) and the material of the canvas.

Figures usually appeared only in the blurred obscurity of the background. Though painted in Paris, those pictures belong to a pictorial tradition practiced primarily in Flanders in the early 17th century, by such artists as David Teniers the Younger. The only indication of the French origin of the paintings are a few objects that Flemish exponents of the same genre would not have pictured in their works. During the 1640s, Kalf further developed the banketje into a novel form of sumptuous and ornate still life (known as pronkstilleven), depicting rich groupings of gold and silver vessels.

=== Mature period (1650–) ===
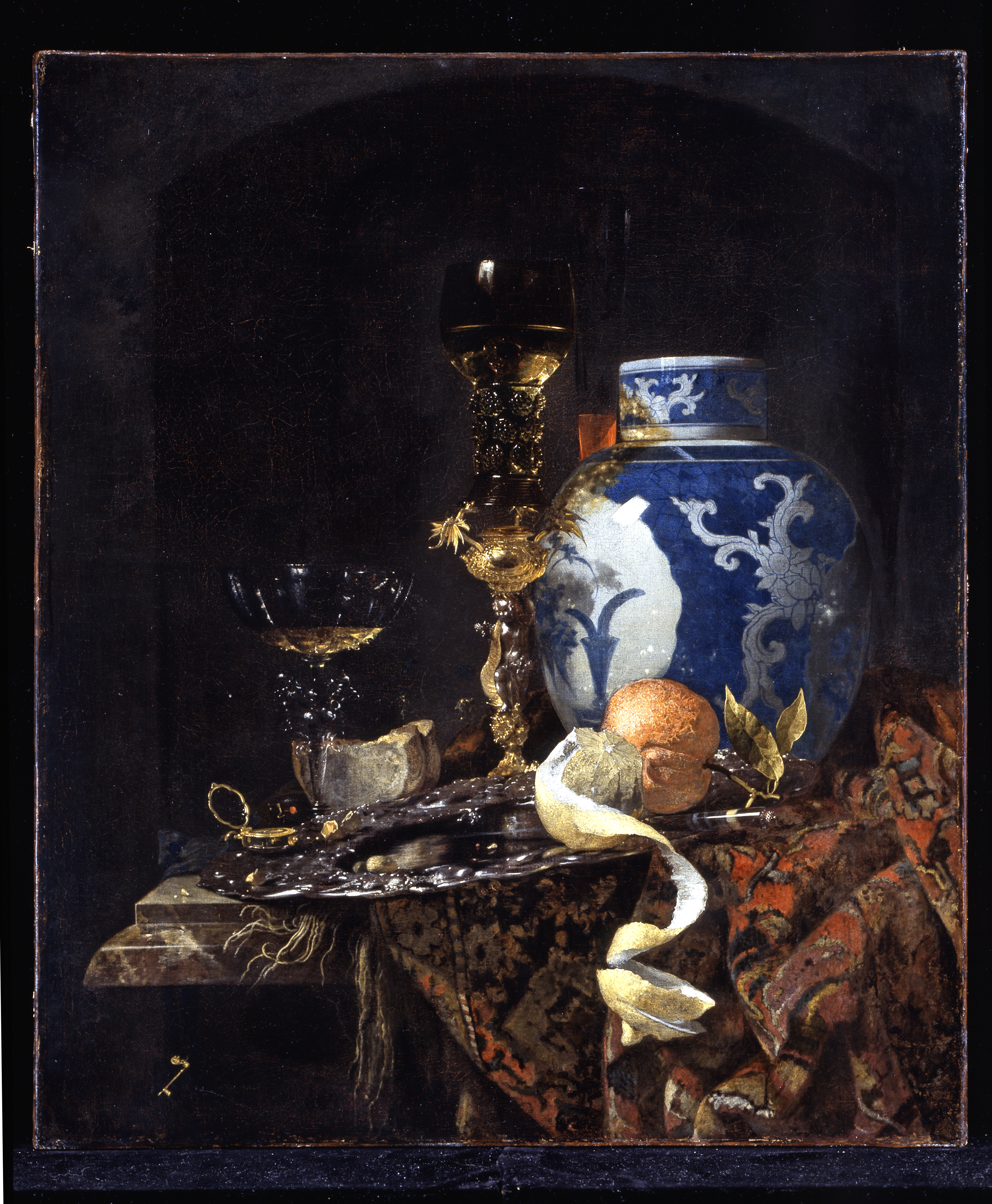
Willem Kalf - Still-Life with a Late Ming Ginger Jar - WGA12080

In his iconic later works painted in Amsterdam, Kalf focused on a series of still lifes of select, often repeated objects carefully placed against a dark background. Usually, a damask cloth or tapestry is draped upon a table on which there is tableware, with gold and silver vessels, many of which have been identified as work of specific goldsmiths, such as Johannes Lutma. There are almost always Venetian-style goblets and a Chinese porcelain bowl from the Wanli period of Ming Dynasty, often tilted so that half-peeled citrus fruits tumble out of it.

Rather than focusing on Dutch cheeses and baked goods, Kalf used the items mentioned above that have been imported from various parts of the world. This was to appeal to the elite burgher audience who have accumulated wealth from the mercantile prosperity of the Dutch Republic.

Like many other still lifes in this period, the fragile, luxurious items featured in Kalf's paintings would be categorized as vanitas elements. However, de Lairesse writes that Kalf's primary intent was to create an aesthetically pleasing arrangement of luxurious items rather than instilling moralizing messages or specific meanings. Thus, the categorization of Kalf's works as vanitas could be merely a byproduct of his work rather than the driving force behind it.

=== Influence and legacy ===
Houbraken Super's biography that Hendrick Gerritsz Pot was Kalf's master, but little in Kalf's early works supports such a relationship. The Rotterdam artist Frans Rijckhals is named as a likely influence to Kalf's French period works due to similarities in color and style. Another figure thought to have introduced Kalf to the Flemish school and influenced his interior paintings is Cornelis Saftleven, as the two may have known each other in Rotterdam.

Kalf's rustic interiors of his French period had a large influence on French art in the circle of the Le Nain brothers. The semi-monochrome still lifes which Kalf created in Paris form a link to the banketjes or 'little banquet pieces' painted by such Dutch artists as Pieter Claesz, Willem Claeszoon Heda and others in the 1630s. Considering the overlap in their style of interior painting and period of stay in Paris, Sébastien Bourdon is also speculated to have been influenced by Kalf though not the other way around.

Little to none is known about his workshop practices as well as official pupils, though replicas suggest that he worked with various assistants during his later Amsterdam years. The method of painting highlights has often been compared to that of Johannes Vermeer, and some suggest that Vermeer was influenced by Kalf. Among those strongly hypothesized to have been Kalf's followers, the most successful was Juriaen van Streeck.

== Popularity ==
Numerous galleries and museums have featured Willem Kalf's work in exhibitions and within the museum. On top of that, his work has been offered at auctions multiple times, with prices ranging up to US$2,775,000. This amount was obtained for a still life painting estimated to be priced between US$2,000,000 and US$4,000,000, sold at Christie's New York in 2019. The still-life painting is titled, A chafing dish, two pilgrims' canteens, a silver-gilt ewer, a plate, and other tableware on a partially draped table, and is one of the 13 known still life paintings from Kalf's French period.

=== Various museums with Willem Kalf's work ===
- Museum Boijmans Van Beuningen, Rotterdam
- Museum de Fundatie, Zwolle
- Mauritshuis, The Hague
- National Gallery of Art, Washington
- Rijksmuseum, Amsterdam
- Staatliche Kunsthalle Karlsruhe, Karlsruhe
- Statens Museum for Kunst, Copenhagen
- Suermondt-Ludwig-Museum, Ake
- Metropolitan Museum of Art, New York
- J. Paul Getty Museum, Los Angeles
- Thyssen-Bornemisza Museum, Madrid

=== Exhibitions that featured Willem Kalf ===
- Willem Kalf 1619–1693, November 25, 2006 – February 18, 2007, Museum Boijmans Van Beuningen.
- Painted light: the still-life paintings of Willem Kalf, 8 March – 3 June 2007, Suermondt-Ludwig Museum.
- Schonheit und verganglichkeit - Niederlandische stilleben aus dem Staatlichen museum Schwerin, December 6, 2007 – February 17, 2008, Kunstforum der Berliner Volksbank, Berlin.
- The magic of things, March 20 – August 17, 2008, Städel Museum, Frankfurt.
- The magic of things, September 5, 2008 – January 4, 2009, Kunstmuseum Basel, Basel.

== Further literature ==
- Bergstöm, I. 'Ottmar Elliger och Willem Kalf', Konsthistorisk Tidskrift, 12 (1943), p. 41–45.
- Bredius, A. 'Een en ander over Willem Kalf', Oud-Holland, 42 (1925), p. 208–209.
- De Witt, D. 'The Bader Collection: European Paintings' Agnes Etherington Art Centre (2014), p. 85–86.
- Houbraken, A. 'De Groote Schouburgh der Nederlantsche Konstschilders en Schilderessen', 3 vols. in 1, (1753, Reprint: Amsterdam, 1976), p. 218–219.
- Louis-François Dubois de Saint-Gelais, Mémoires sur Philippe et Nicolas Vleughels, s.d., s.l. (Rome, c. 1734–1737).
- Mai, E. 'Zuschreibung Fragen - Neue Erkenntnisse zum Werk von Kalf, Victors, Hoogstraten', Kölner Museums-Bulletin, 2 (1988), p. 4–18.
- Van den Brink, P. Meijer, F.G. and Böhmer, S. 'Gemaltes Licht: die Stilleben von Willem Kalf, 1619–1693.' München: Deutscher Kunstverlag, (2007).
- Van Gelder, H.E. 'Aanteekeningen over Willem Kalf en Cornelia Pluvier', Oud-Holland, 59 (1942), p. 37–46.
- Van Luttervelt, R. 'Aanteekeningen over de Ontwikkeling van Willem Kalf', Oud-Holland, 60 (1943), p. 60–68.
- Wheelock, Arthur K., Jr. 'Dutch Paintings of the Seventeenth Century', The Collections of the National Gallery of Art Systematic Catalogue, (1995), p. 145–146.
