= Roelof Jansz van Vries =

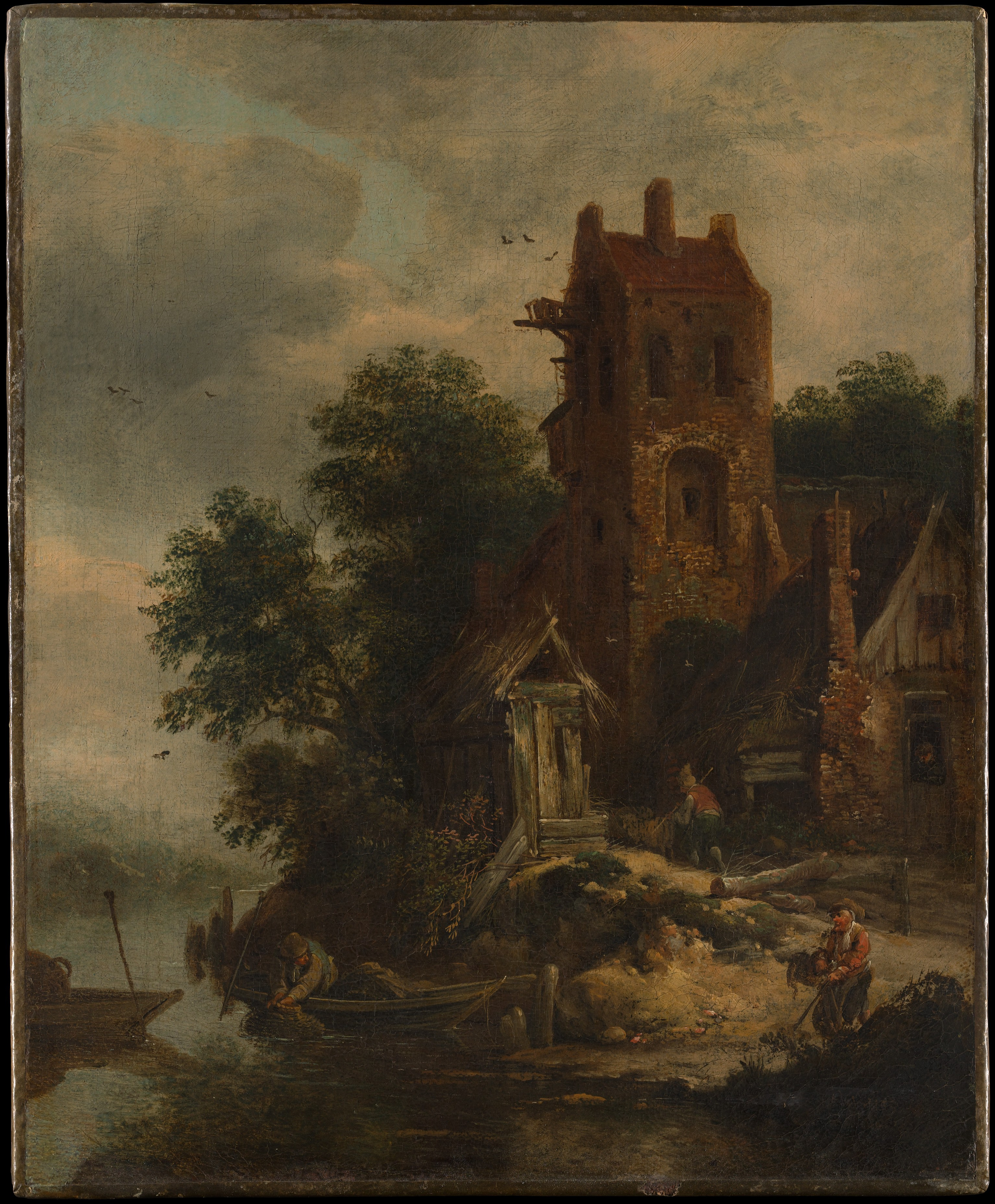
- The Pigeon House, Metropolitan Museum of Art, New York.
- Born: 1631; Haarlem
- Died: 1681/1701; Amsterdam
- Known for: Painting, drawing
- Movement: Dutch Golden Age
- Spouse: Marytje Adriaens

Roelof Jansz van Vries or Roelof van Vries (1631, Haarlem – 1681/1701, Amsterdam) was a Dutch painter of the Dutch Golden Age. Known for his landscapes, his works can be seen at the Metropolitan Museum of Art, the Rijksmuseum, the National Gallery, etc.

== Biography ==
Roelof van Vries was born in 1631 in Haarlem (Netherlands) where he later studied. He is possibly the son of Jacob Roelofsz de Vries(who was 18 years old in December 1626 in Haarlem). The date of his first known work shows that he became a painter around 1652 (he is often considered to be the same person then Roelandt van Vries who became a member of the Guild of Saint Luke of Leiden in 1653).

He was enrolled in the Guild of Saint Luke of Haarlem in 1657. We find him in Amsterdam in 1659, from where he never moved. On October 11, 1659, he published the banns of his marriage with Marytje Adriaens, from Haarlem, and married her in Amsterdam in 1659, at the age of 28. His wedding witness is the painter Reynier Hals, son of the painter Frans Hals.

He died in Amsterdam between 1681 and 1701. The precise date of his death is not known. We only know that the register of the Guild of Saint Luke of Amsterdam, kept by Vincent van der Vinne, mentions him as dead in 1702.

== His work ==
Stylistically close to Jacob van Ruisdael, he also shows influences from Gillis Rombouts and Cornelis Decker, which all worked in Haarlem. Van Vries concentrated on landscapes, in which the figures often came from the hands of other painters such as Adriaen van de Velde and Johannes Lingelbach.

Close to the landscape painter Jacob van Ruisdael, Van Vries was very early appreciated in France and the painter Charles Le Brun had one of his works.

Roelof van Vries is often recognized by his way of very carefully painting walls and foliage, adorning them with small golden dots, such as Meindert Hobbema and Klaes Molenaer.

Van Vries rubbed shoulders with the painters Egbert van Heemskerk II, Leendert de Laeff, Pieter Nijs, Jan Theunisz Blanckerhoff, Johan Hackaert and Aernout van der Neer

== Works ==
- The Pigeon House, New York City, Metropolitan Museum of Art
- Landscape with a Falconer, Rijksmuseum, Amsterdam
- View of a village, National Gallery, London
- Village on the banks of a river, Philadelphia Museum of Art.
- A farm and its outbuildings in the dunes, Bredius Museum, The Hague.
- Peasant huts in a wood, Städel Museum, Frankfurt
- Wooded landscape with a river, Budapest Museum of Fine Arts
- Landscape with a towerDulwich Picture Gallery, London
- A tower by a river, Fitzwilliam Museum, Cambridge.
- River in a Village, Holburne Museum, Somerset
- Travelers at the Edge of a Village, Birmingham Museums Trust, Birmingham
- A Path leading through a Wood with Figures, Ashmolean Museum, Oxford
- Boat near a ruin, Collection Dumez, Château de Compiègne.
- Construction of a tower by a canal, Nationalmuseum, Stockholm.
- Landscape with Ruins and a River, Bowes Museum, Durham .
- Travelers among ruins, King John's Palace Museum III, Warsaw.
- Ruin of a castle, Nationalmuseum, Stockholm.

== Gallery ==
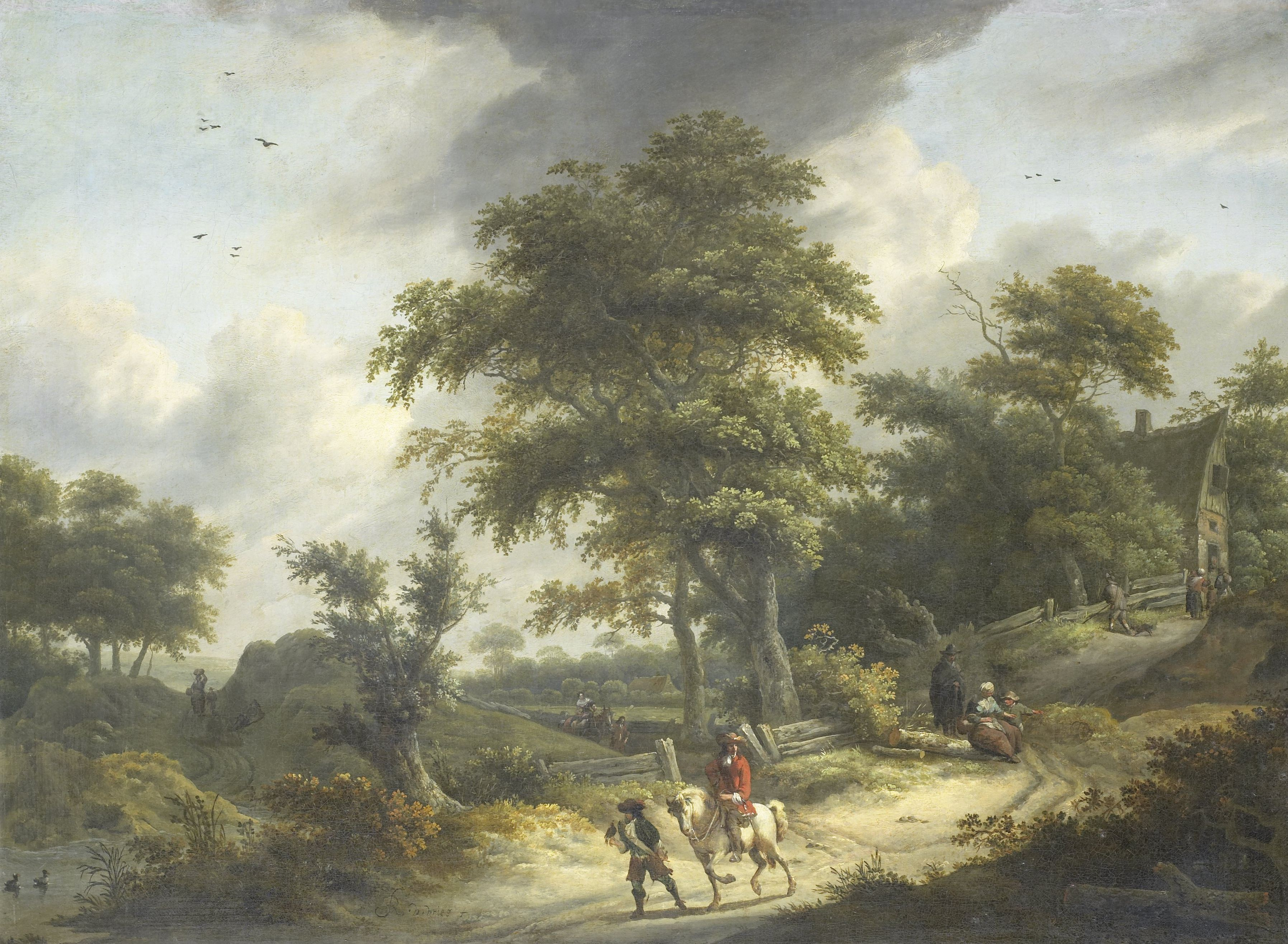
Landscape with a falconer, Rijksmuseum, Amsterdam.

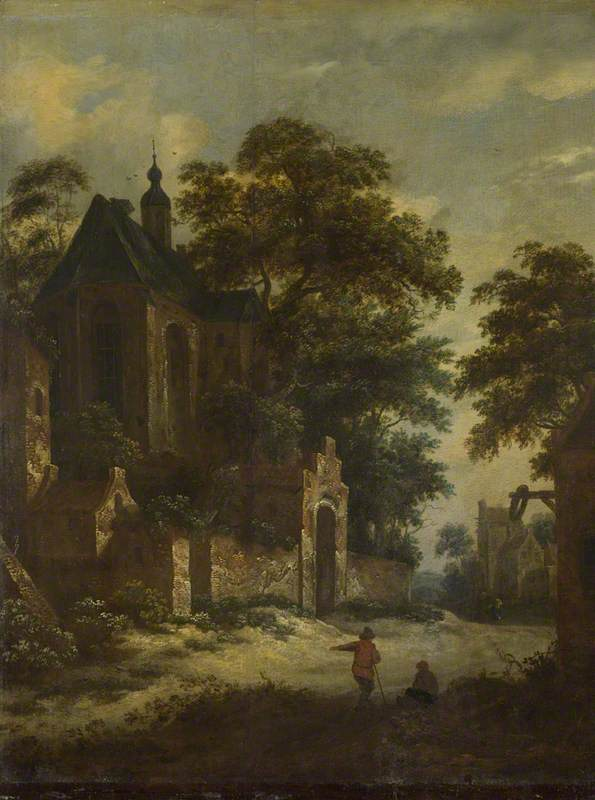
A View of a Village, National Gallery, London.

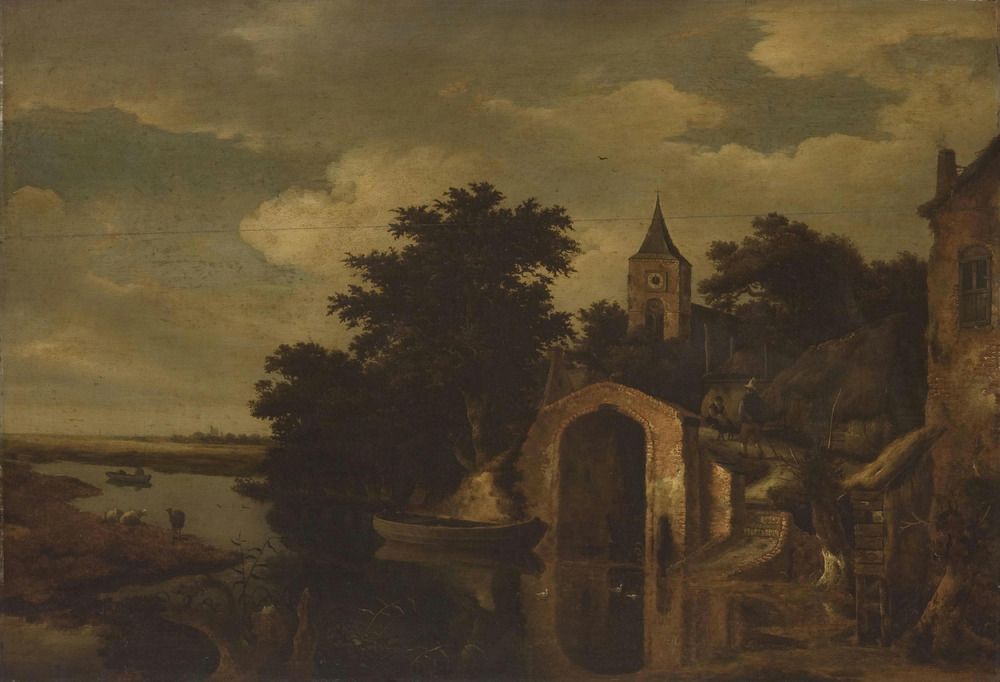
Village by a river, Philadelphia Museum of Art.

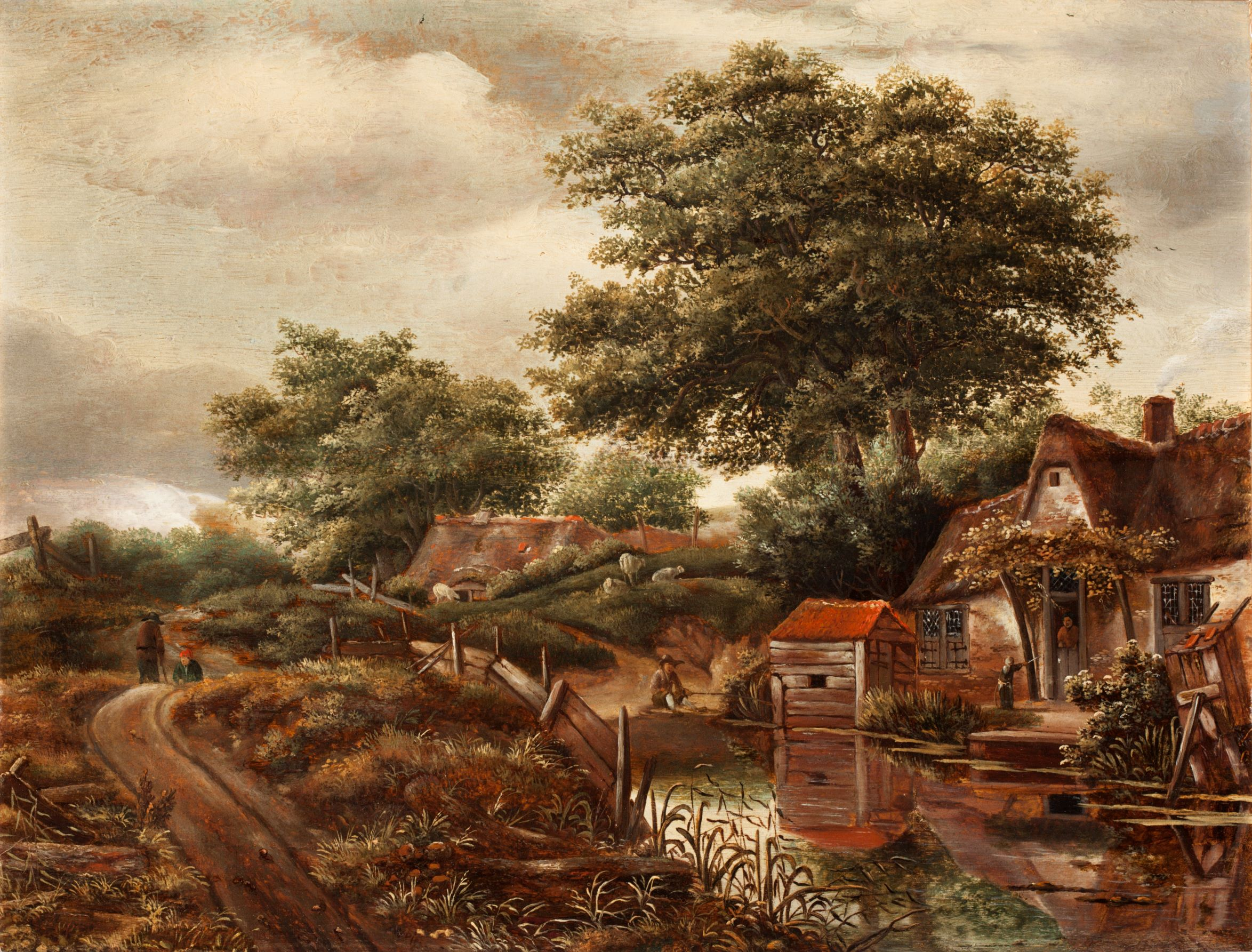
Boerenhoeves in de duinen, Bredius Museum, The Hague.

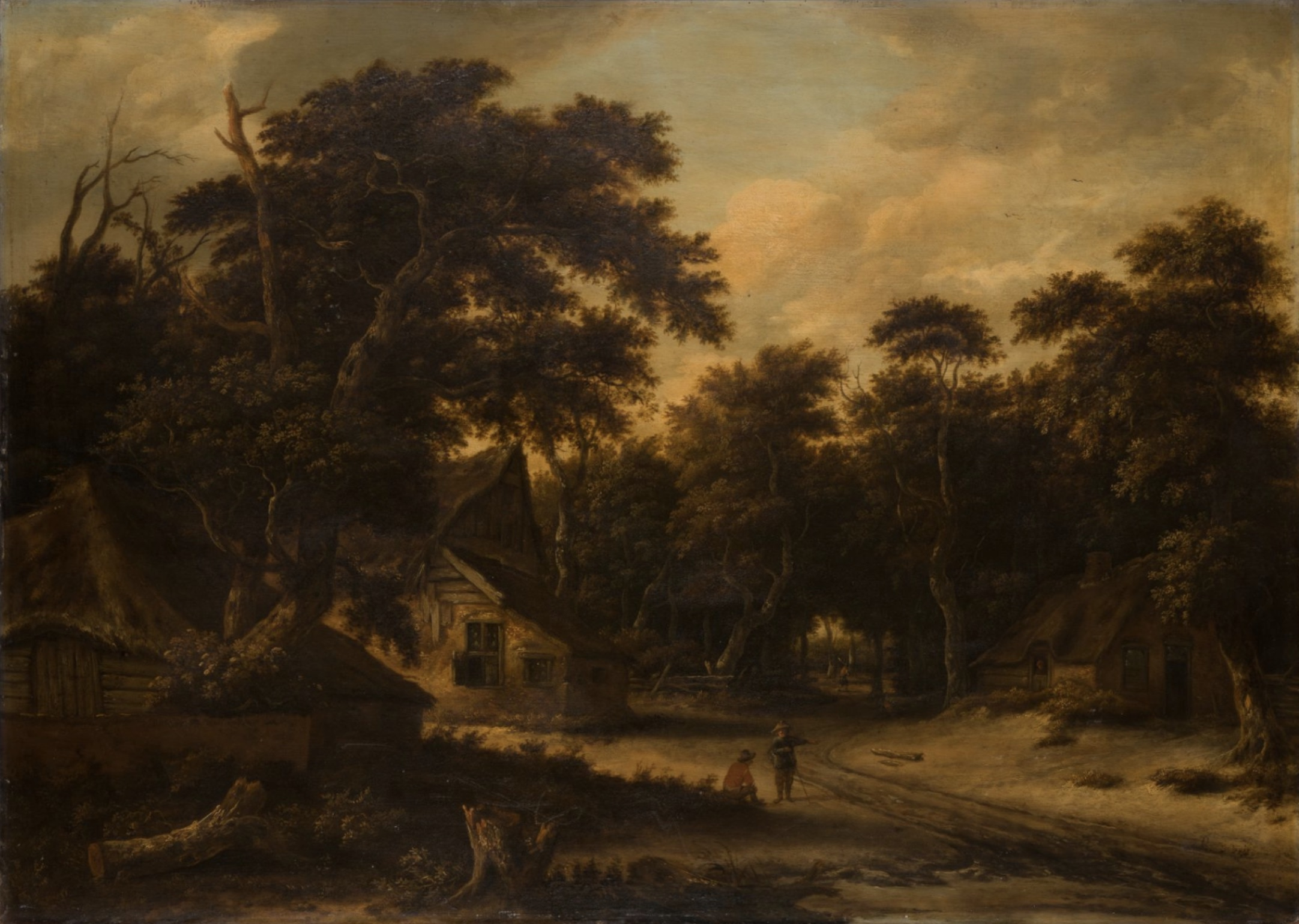
Peasant Huts in a Wood, Städel Museum, Frankfurt.

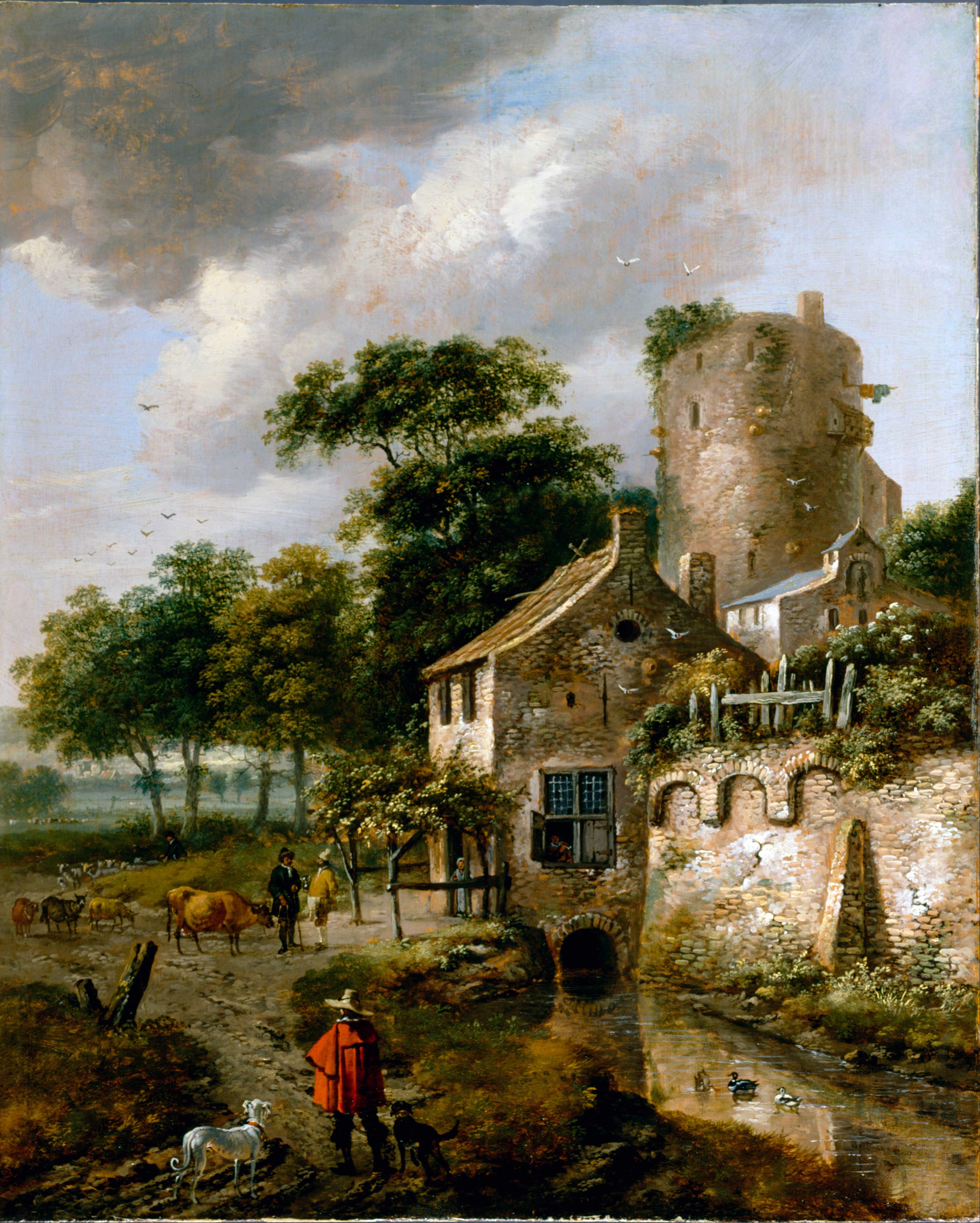
Landscape with a Tower, Dulwich Picture Gallery, London.

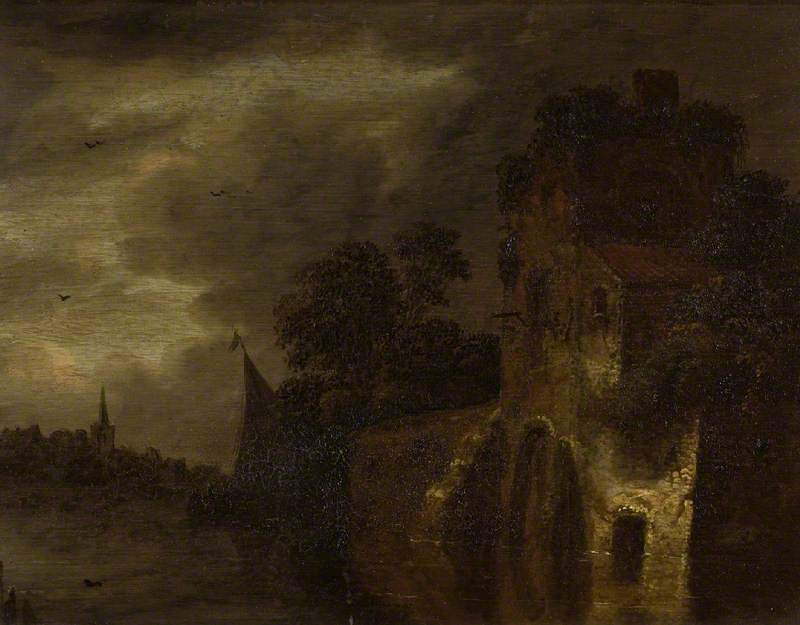
A Tower beside a River, Fitzwilliam Museum, Cambridge.

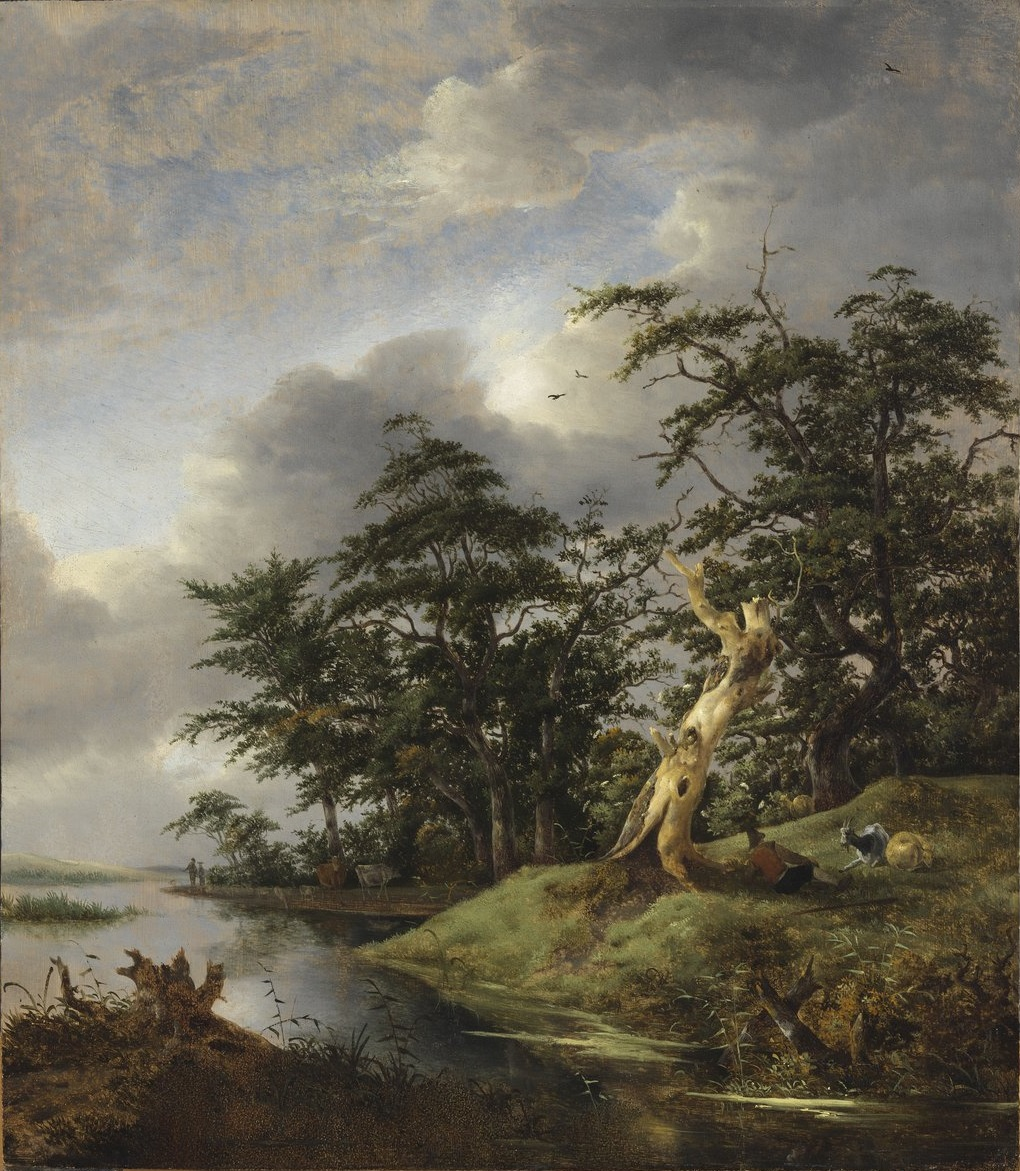
Wooded landscape with a river, Budapest Museum of Fine Arts.

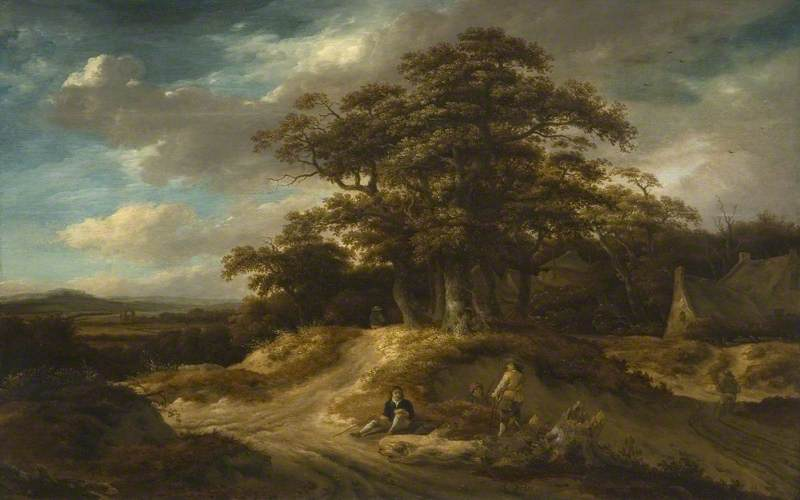
Travelers at the Edge of a Village, Birmingham Museums Trust.

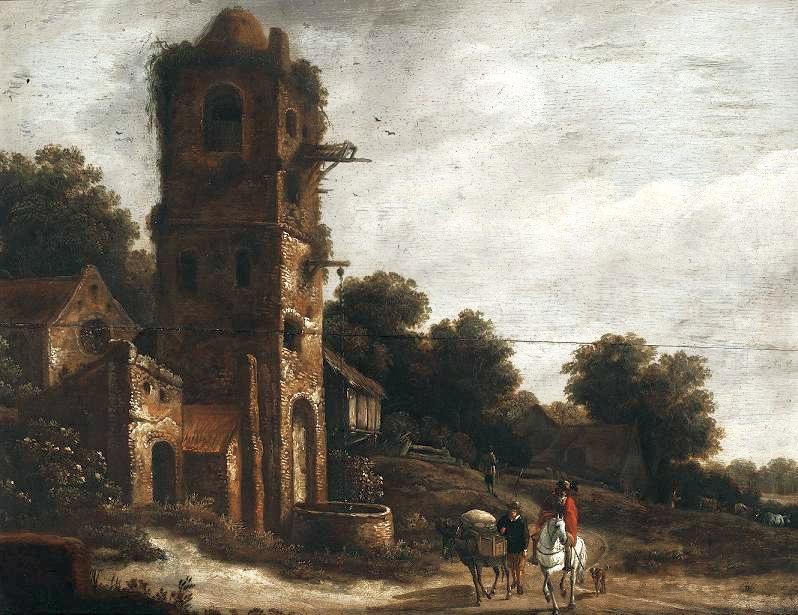
Travelers among ruins, Palace Museum of King John III, Warsaw.

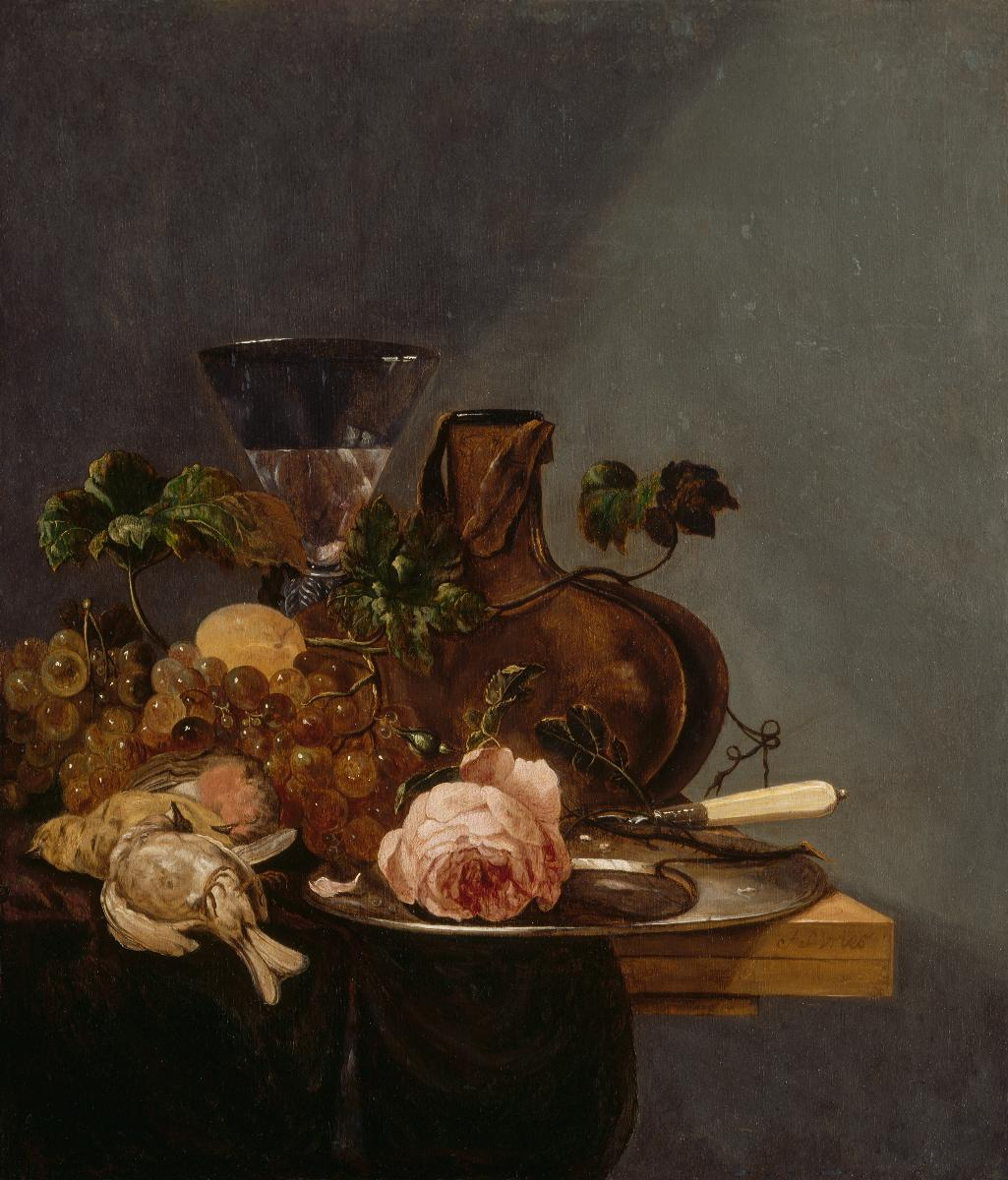
