= Josua de Grave =

Dutch Golden Age draughtsman and painter

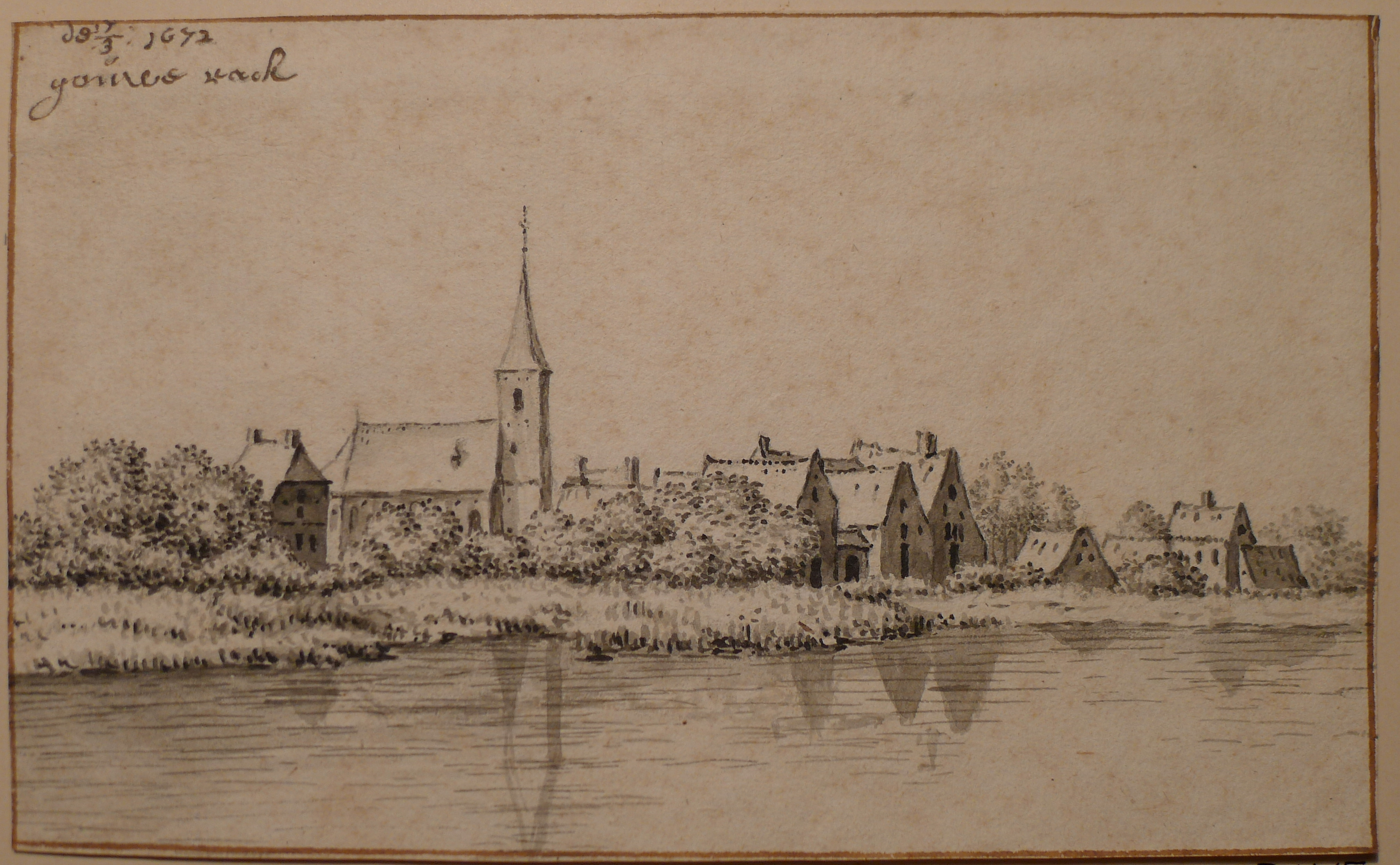
The Village of Gouderak/ March 17, 1672

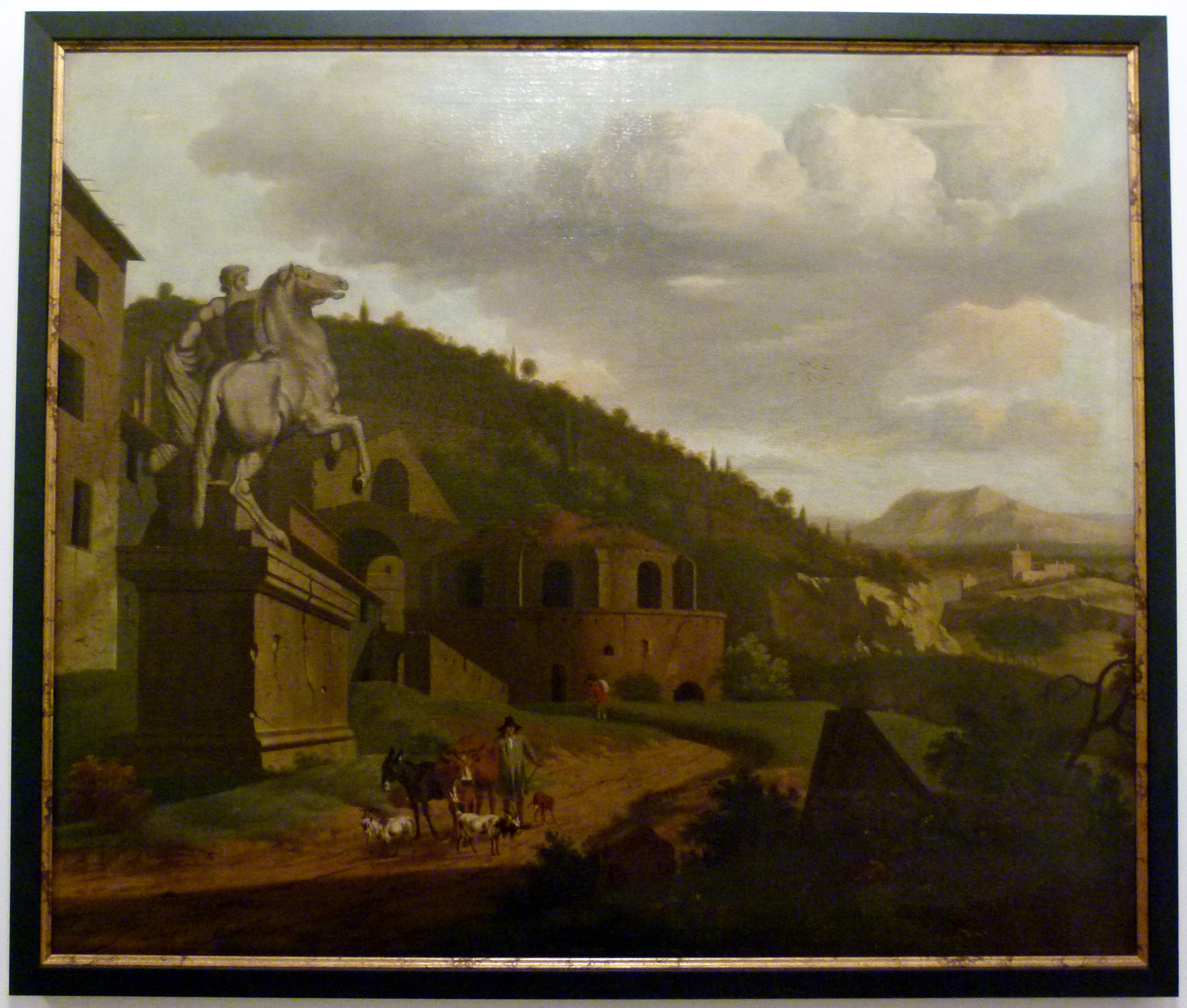
Landscape with a statue of a Roman horse tamer, 1684

Josua de Grave (1643 in Amsterdam – 1712 in The Hague), was a Dutch Golden Age draughtsman and painter.

== Biography ==
De Grave is best known for his topographical drawings of the Southern Netherlands, including Maastricht and some in France during the years 1667–1668, among which drawings of the military camps of Stadholder William III during the campaigns against the French in 1674–1676. He later refocussed on imaginary and Italianate landscapes, often with a strong accent on perspective. He became a member of the Haarlem Guild of St. Luke in 1659. His relationship to Timotheus de Graaf (1647-1724), a teacher of Jacob Appel has not been established. His topographical work is often confused with that of Valentijn Klotz (and his brother(?) Barnardus Klotz), with whom he made several travels together. He drew mostly in black or brown pen with grey wash. A few paintings of his, mostly with imaginary landscapes, are also known.

== Sources ==
- B.J. van Hasselt. Drie tekenaars van topografische prenten in Brabant en elders: Valentijn Klotz, Josua de Grave en Constantijn Huygens jr. in Jaarboek "de Ghulden Roos" . Nr. 25 (1965) pag. 145–192. (Dutch)
- M.H.Breitbarth-van der Stok. Josua de Grave, Valentinus Klotz en Barnardus Klotz, in Bulletin KNOB Nr. 68 (1969). (Dutch, summary in English)
