= Pieter Fris =

Dutch Golden Age landscape painter (1627–1706)

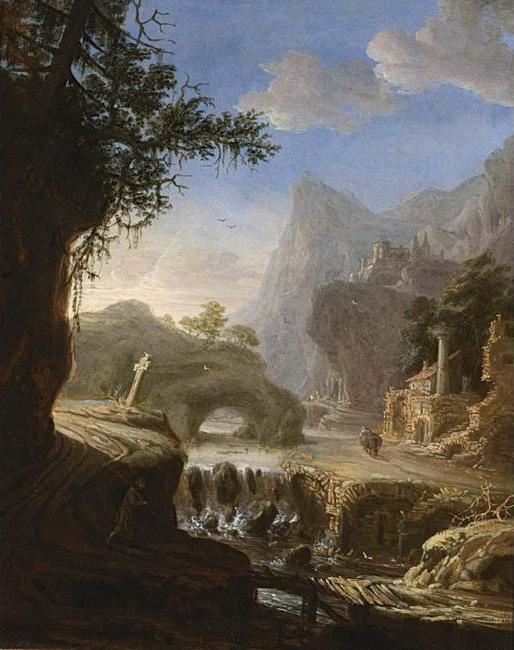
Landscape with figures, 1650

Pieter Fris (1627 – 1706) was a Dutch Golden Age landscape painter.

== Biography ==
Fris was born in Amsterdam. According to Houbraken he was a painter of moralistic and fantasy pieces who joined the Bentvueghels in Rome at the young age of 17 with the nickname Welgemoed (courage) for withstanding his acceptance ceremony without flinching. A poem was written about his courage, inspired by a ceremony in which he stood surrounded by firecrackers going off around him. Houbraken mentioned that Fris was embarrassed about the art profession, though he continued to practice it in Delft in later life. He was embarrassed because he felt that it wasn't as honest as other commercial pursuits.

The Fris Bentvueghel initiation ceremony story inspired Houbraken to close the second volume of his three volume Schouburg with a long poem of his own using all of the "Bent" nicknames he knew. He meant this poem as a tribute to all of the Bentvueghel painters through the ages, quoting his teacher Samuel van Hoogstraten and referring to the publication on ancient Roman ruins in 1709 by the Amsterdam publisher Johannes Crellius based on a set of drawings by Bonaventura van Overbeek (bentname Romulus), engraved by Matthys Pool including scenes of the Bentvueghels in action.

According to the RKD, Fris was registered in Rome in 1645, in Dordrecht in 1647, and in Amsterdam in 1657. He became a member of the Haarlem Guild of Saint Luke from 1660 until 1668. He was living in Haarlem from 1666 to 1669, in Amsterdam in 1677, and in Delft in 1688 (he became a member of the Delft Guild of St. Luke in 1683). He died in Delft.
