= Jan Coelenbier =

Dutch painter

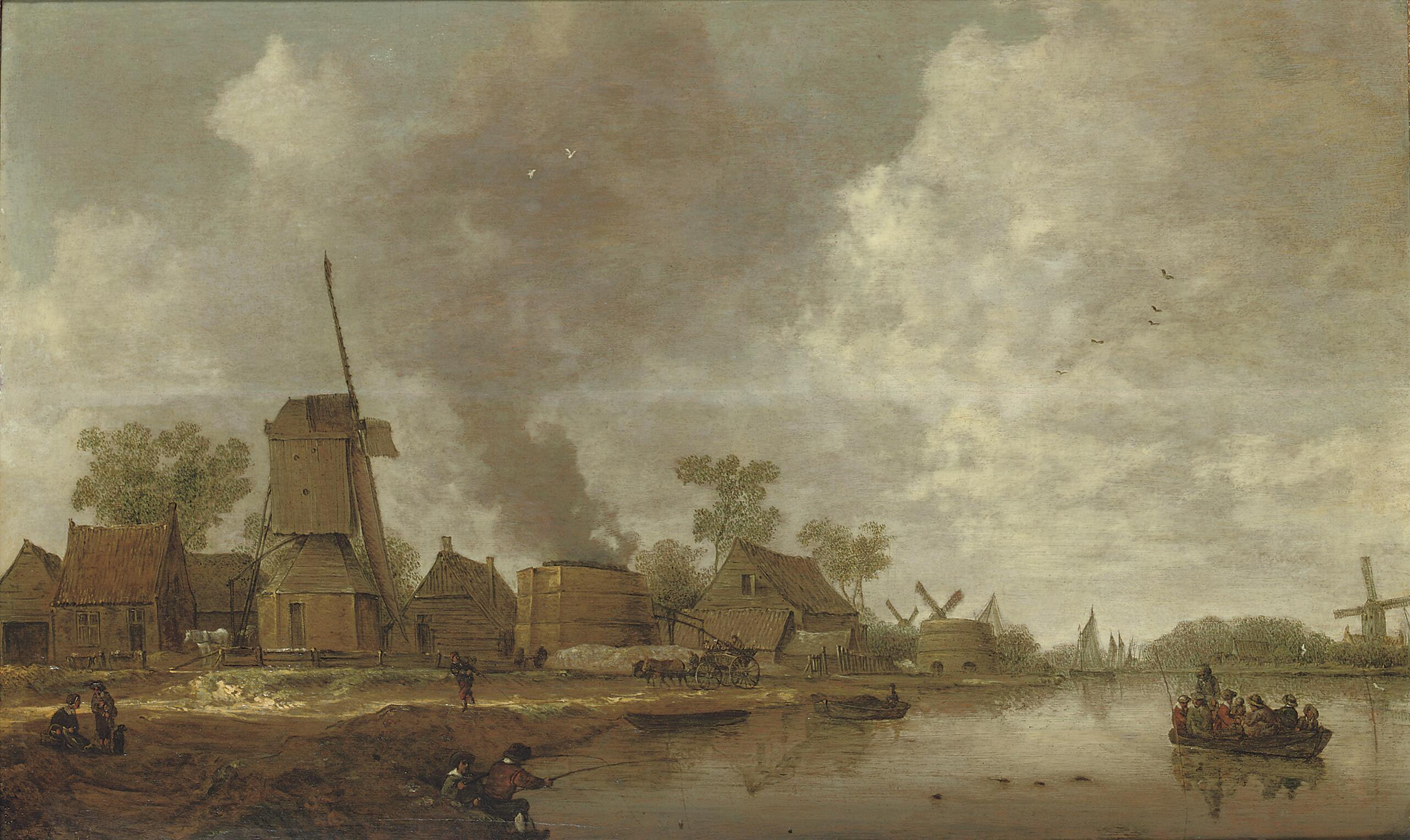
River scene with sailboats, a rowboat, ovens, windmills, houses, and fishermen, 1646

Jan Coelenbier (1610, Kortrijk – 1680, Haarlem), was a Dutch Golden Age landscape painter.

== Biography ==
According to the RKD he was a pupil of Pieter de Molijn and became a member of the Haarlem Guild of St. Luke in 1632. He married in 1638 and is mentioned in archives as a merchant in 1675 and 1676. He is known for landscapes in the manner of Jan van Goyen.

He was listed as coming from Utrecht and being a pupil of Van Goyen, "whose works he imitated so closely that they passed for the originals", in Bryan's Dictionary of Painters and Engravers.
