= Pieter van Berendrecht =

Dutch painter

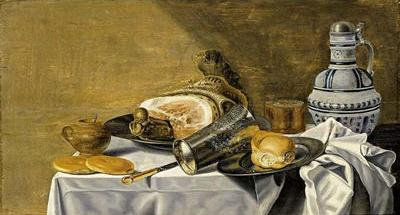
Still life, 1643

Pieter van Berendrecht (1616 – 1662), was a Dutch Golden Age still life painter.

== Biography ==
According to the RKD he was a member of the Haarlem Guild of St. Luke from 1632, and became master in 1642. He got married in Haarlem in 1644 and again in Amsterdam in 1653, in March 1662 witnessed the marriage of his son Pieter in Weesp. After 1662 nothing more is known of him. Though the Haarlem St. Luke archives do not mention his style, he is recorded by Vincent van der Vinne, who was a still life painter himself, and based on his signature in church documents, his works have been attributed to the monnogrammist 'PVB'. These works were painted in the monochrome still life style of Willem Claesz Heda and Pieter Claesz, also of Haarlem. One period copy of Pieter Claesz painting has also been attributed to him.
