= Barent Gael =

Dutch Golden Age painter (1630–1698)

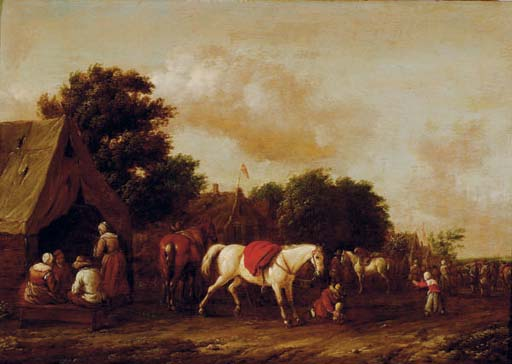
Peasants by a cottage with a horse stalling, ca 1650-1660

Barent Gael (c. 1630 – 1698) was a Dutch Golden Age landscape painter.

== Biography ==
Gael was born in Haarlem. According to Houbraken, he was a pupil of Philips Wouwerman, who painted many battle pieces and staging areas (Dutch: pleisterplaatsen). He was in the habit of keeping his own schedule at the risk of offending customers – Houbraken relates a moment when a patron came to his house for a viewing and he claimed he "wasn't at home". The patron was so insulted that when Gael came to him with the finished painting, he claimed he was now "not at home" and refused payment.

According to the RKD, he painted Italianate landscapes and was prominent in the Haarlem Guild of St. Luke by 1642. His latest known dated painting is from 1679, but his paintings are rarely dated. He is listed as dead in a list of guild members by Vincent van der Vinne's son Laurens in 1702. He moved from Haarlem to Amsterdam sometime between the years 1661 and 1673, where he remained until his death.

An apprenticeship to Wouwerman was never found in the archives during the period under review, but he shows strong influence by Haarlem colleagues. He has a large oeuvre that is somewhat monotonous.
