= Nicolaes Hals =

Dutch Golden Age painter

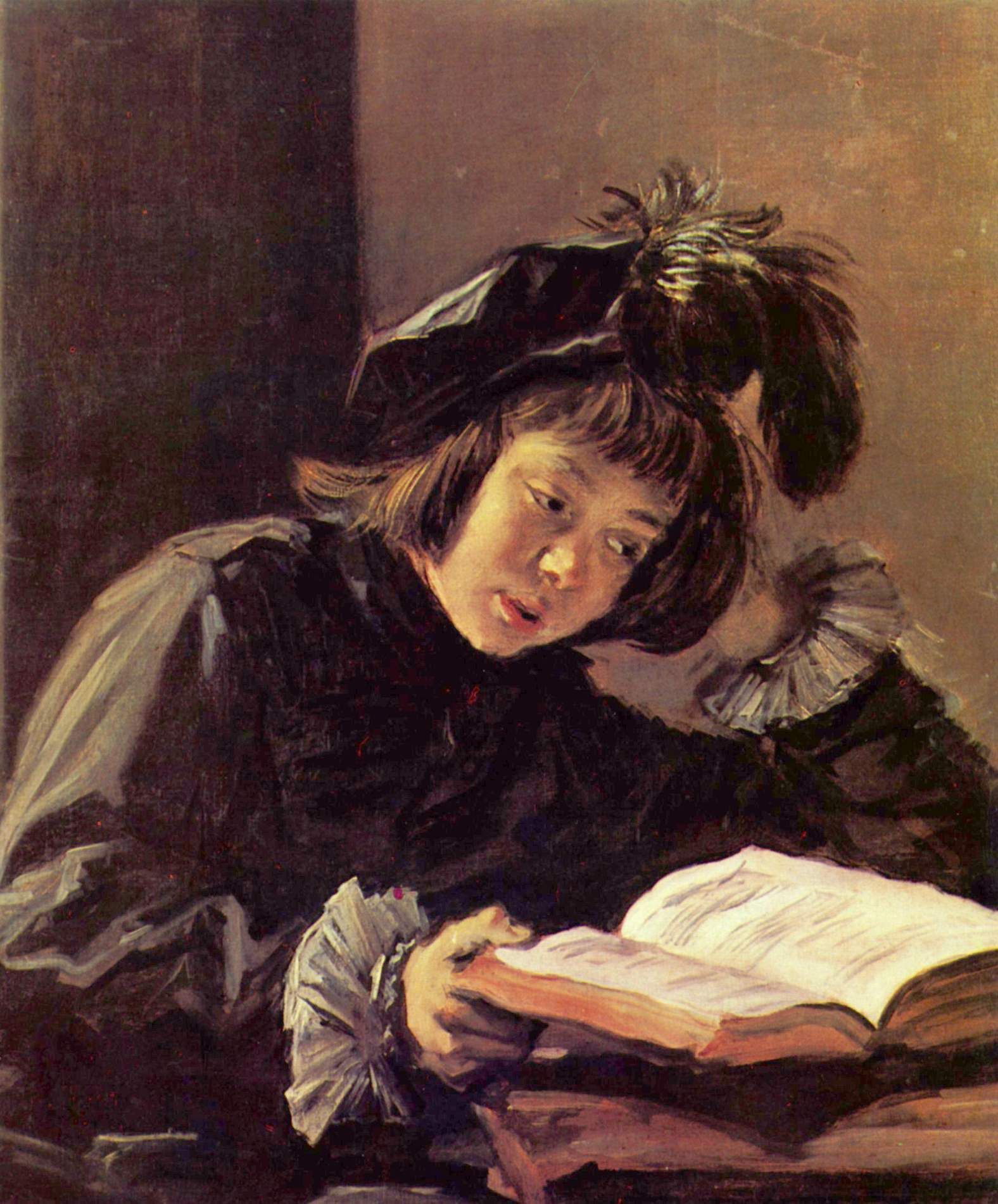
Portrait of Nicolaes Hals reading, by his father, Frans Hals

Nicolaes Hals (1628, Haarlem – 1686, Haarlem), was a Dutch Golden Age painter.

== Biography ==
According to Houbraken who mistakenly mentioned him as one of the grandsons of the painter Frans Hals by his son Jan, he was like his brothers Harman, Frans II, and Jan, good at music and painting.

According to the RKD he was the son of Frans Hals and his second wife, who, when he grew up, painted landscapes and architectural scenes in addition to portraits. The age gap between Nicolaes and his older halfbrother Harmen is probably the reason that Houbraken called him a grandson. In 1655 he married a rich widow from Haaksbergen, but they did not have any children. His works are sometimes confused with those of Nicolaes Molenaer. He was a pupil of his father together with Pieter Gerritsz van Roestraten, who married his sister. He was also familiar with his cousin Anthony, the son of his uncle Dirck Hals.

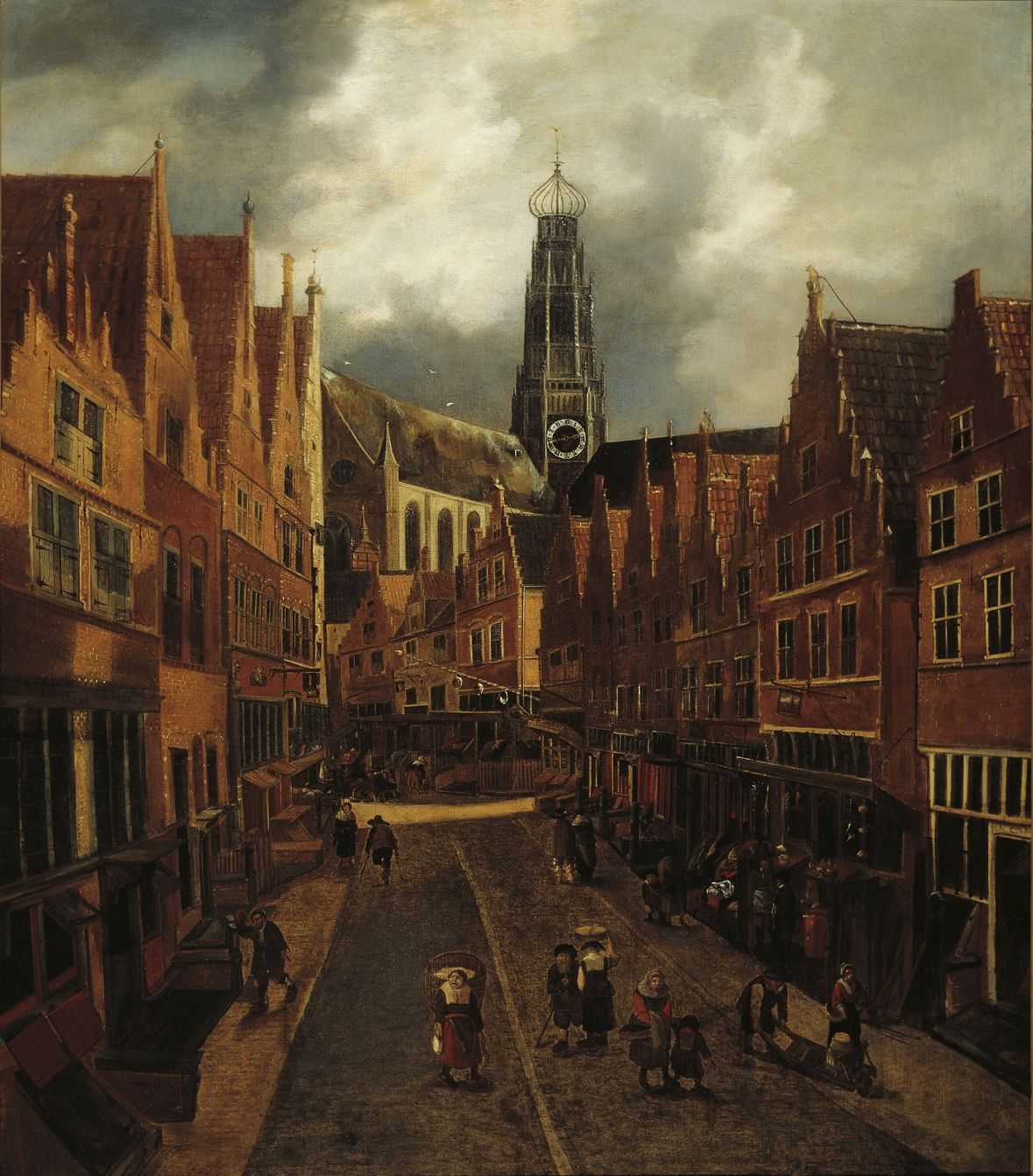
Haarlem in the Grote Houtstraat looking north towards the Grote Kerk
