= Philips Angel II =

Dutch painter

Philips Angel II or Philips Angel van Leiden (c. 1618 in Leiden – after 11 July 1664 in Batavia, Dutch East Indies) was a Dutch Golden Age painter, etcher, writer and colonial administrator. Today he is remembered as the author of a 58-page booklet entitled 'Praise of the Art of Painting' which represents a rare resource for understanding Dutch art theory from the mid-17th century.

== Biography ==
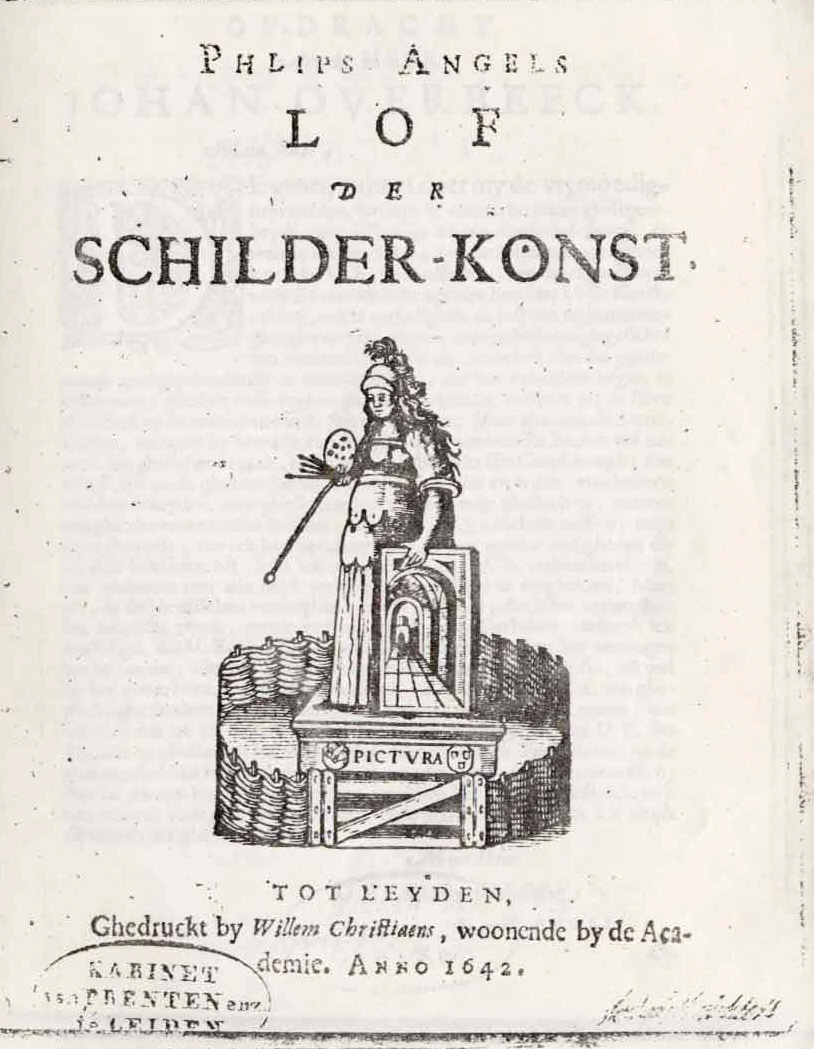
Title page of Lof der Schilder-Konst

Philips Angel II's life and work are often mixed up with those of a relative (apparently a cousin), a contemporary painter of the same name (now referred to as Philips Angel I or Philips Angel van Middelburg), who was born in Middelburg in 1616.

Philips Angel II was active as a painter in Leiden from 1637 where he is listed as a master painter in 1638. Nothing is known about his training, but some details of his life suggest he had been in contact with Rembrandt shortly before becoming a master painter. He married in 1639. He held a speech at a banquet for the Leiden Guild of Saint Luke on the feast day of Saint Luke on 18 October in 1641. The speech was published in Leiden the following year under the title 'Praise of the Art of Painting' (original title: 'Lof der Schilder-konst'). In the work he praises the work of his Dutch contemporary and fellow Leiden citizen Gerard Dou, a pupil of Rembrandt.

On 15 December 1643 he drew up a will in Leiden. He signed a document stating he was ceasing all activities as a painter (probably to relieve himself of the duty to pay dues to the guild) in 1645 and joined the Dutch East India Company. In the same year he sailed to Batavia in the Dutch East Indies. Here he would reside with interruptions from 1645 to 1664.

In the company of envoy Joan Cunaeus he traveled as a 'Chief Buyer' (in Dutch: opperkoopman) of the Dutch East India Company to Persia where he arrived in Bender-Abassi on 25 December 1651. He visited the ruins of Persepolis on 16 February 1652 and 11 days later took up his new post. With his interpreter Nils Mathson Köping he also traveled to Arabia. When soon thereafter he had to resign because of irregularities in his management, he travelled to Isfahan in Persia. Here he was the drawing master of Shah Abbas II of Persia (1641-1666), grandson of Shah Abbas the Great.

In 1656 he was summoned to Batavia to justify himself. As he failed to clear his name he was forced to leave the service of the Dutch East India Company. He was able to obtain other administrative positions in Batavia. Again there were irregularities in his management of affairs and he was removed from all posts on 11 October 1661.

== Work ==
No extant paintings of Philips Angel II are known to exist. An etch of a man's head by him is dated 1637 and is reminiscent of Rembrandt.

== Lof der Schilder-konst ==
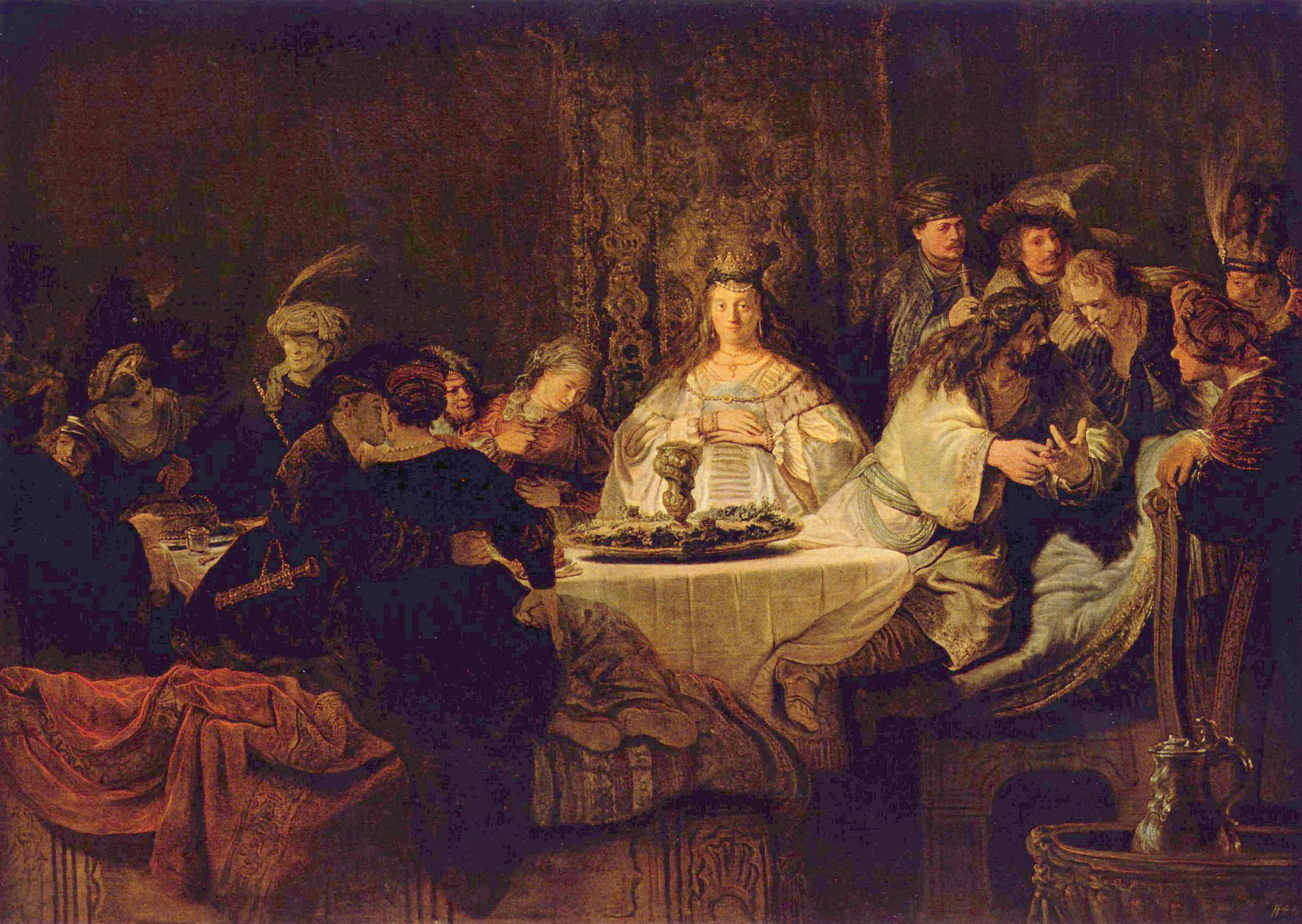
The Wedding of Samson, by Rembrandt, 1638

His booklet 'Lof der Schilder-konst' ('Praise of the Art of Painting') situates itself in a line of art historical and theoretical writing in the Dutch Republic that started with the 'Schilder-boeck' published by Flemish émigré Karel van Mander in Haarlem in 1604. Angel gave his lecture at a time when he and other painters in Leiden were seeking permission to establish a guild to protect their economic interests. They likely also sought recognition as a group with an important socio-economic status in local society. The latter is reflected in the first part of the book which seeks to affirm the status of the painter's profession.

The first part of the booklet makes the traditional comparisons between the value and ranking of painting, sculpture and poetry. In this part Angel liberally borrows anecdotes on famous painters from antiquity up to the 17th century from van Mander's Schilder-boeck. According to Angel, painting deserves more praise than the other two arts because it can imitate all that is visible in nature.

The second part of the booklet deals with the wide range of skills that a painter must master to excel. This is the most original part of the booklet as Angel describes genres such as seascapes, battle scenes and guardroom scenes that were new at the time. One of the skills he emphasizes is the ability to accurately imitate visible things, so that they seem 'truly real'. He argues that light and shadow must be divided so that even things that appear difficult to imitate with brush and paint seem very real. As a final point, he recommends the need for neatness (a careful, smooth way of painting) which must be accompanied by a certain 'lossicheyt' (looseness) in order to avoid a "stiff neat unpleasantnesss'. He praises Gerard Dou as a painter accomplished in this respect. Finally, Angel emphasises the need of a painter to display a pleasant behaviour, virtue and industry - especially the latter is strongly emphasized - in order to obtain the highest honor and fame as a painter. According to the book, the main concern of painting should be to please the eye of the beholder.

The largest section of Angel’s book is devoted to history painting and he discusses several contemporary Old Testament paintings including Rembrandt’s 'The Wedding of Samson'. He argues that in order to depict 'godly, poetic and heathen histories' one must first read the texts of the stories well so that the information in these stories is represented accurately without mistakes in relation to the text. Angel is not concerned about expressing the deeper meanings inherent in these stories and neither does he stress the need to express emotions to move the beholder. Angel expresses no clear consciousness of a hierarchy between the different genres. His appreciation for Gerard Dou, who had already started to concentrate mainly on paintings of interiors and tronies is certainly no less than that for Rembrandt and Jan Lievens.
