= Philips Angel I =

Dutch painter

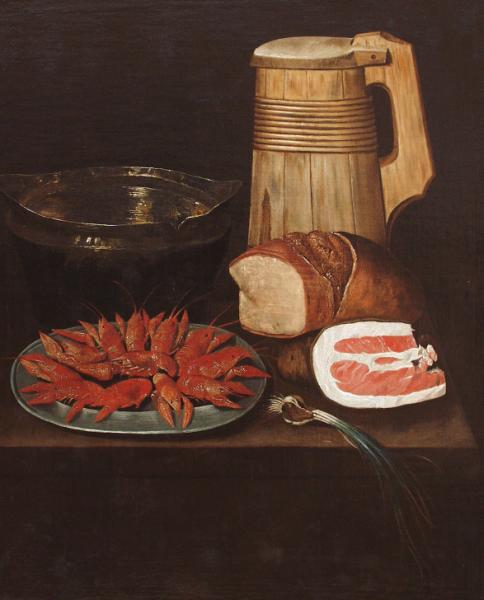
Still life with crayfish, Museum Bredius.

Philips Angel I (bapt. 14 September 1616 - (after?) October 1683) was a Dutch painter of still lifes.

== Biography ==
Philips Angel I left his native Middelburg in 1639 to establish himself as a still life painter in Haarlem. He entered the Haarlem Guild of St. Luke in 1639 and was still mentioned as a member in 1643.

He returned to Middelburg at least in 1652 and remained there until his death.

Philips Angel I's life and work are often mixed up with those of a relative (presumably a cousin), the contemporary painter of the same name (referred to as Philips Angel II or Philips Angel van Leiden), born in 1618 in Leiden. Philips Angel II was active as a painter in Leiden from 1637 to 1645, then sailed to Batavia, Dutch East Indies where he died after 11 July 1664.

== Work ==
Approximately 30 paintings are currently attributed to Philips Angel I, some with dates between 1642 and 1664 or 1668. He was mainly a still life painter. Due to confusion resulting from the signatures and dates which he added to his paintings it is difficult to determine the development of his art with its divergent subgenres, especially his sober still lifes with food, dishes and kitchen-objects sometimes known as ontbijtjes (Dutch for 'breakfast pieces').

His works fall into three main groups: barn interiors with an emphasis on the still life element, 'ontbijtjes' and still lifes with dead fowl. The influence of Frans Rijckhals can be seen in the first two groups. Ryckhals may have been Angel's teacher in Middelburg.

His 'ontbijtjes' show the influence of Haarlem painters such as Floris van Dyck in their tendency to build compositions from individually studied components and in the rendering of various details. The still lifes with dead fowl belong to his best works and are similar to the game pieces of the Flemish painters Jan Fyt and Alexander Adriaenssen. These works demonstrate Angel's skill at painting fur and feathers.

== Works ==
- A still-life, signed P. Angel, 1660 — is in the Berlin Museum.
- Still-life with crayfish, Museum Bredius
- Still-life with dead birds on a table, 1649, Old Town Hall of Middelburg (NL)
- Still life paintings on Artnet
