= Pieter de Molijn =

Dutch painter (1595–1661)

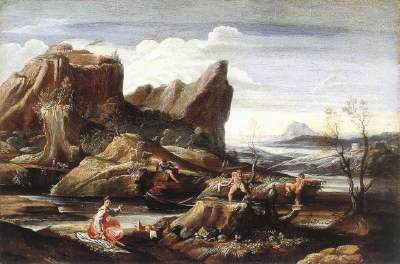
Landscape with conversing peasants. Ca. 1640. Budapest, Szépmuvészeti Múzeum.

Pieter de Molijn (6 April 1595 in London – 23 March 1661 in Haarlem) was a Dutch Golden Age painter and engraver of English birth and Flemish descent.

He was baptized in the Dutch Reformed Austin Friars church in London. He was born to Pieter de Moijn, from Ghent, and Lynken van den Bossche, from Brussels. It is possible that the family emigrated in pursuit of work rather than to avoid religious persecution. Little is known of his early training, but he probably traveled to Italy and in 1616 he became a member of the Haarlem Guild of St. Luke. He was a contemporary of Jacob Pinas. He married Geertuyt Huygen de Bie. During the years 1616–27 he lived in Delft where he remarried after his first wife died. In the marriage notice, his wife Geertruyt de Roovere is from Amsterdam and he is from Delft.

De Molijn was possibly a student of Esaias van de Velde. He taught several students, including Gerard ter Borch the Elder & his son, Jan Coelenbier, Allart van Everdingen, Christian de Hulst, Anthony Molijn (1635–1702), and Jan Wils. De Molijn was known for his landscapes, but he also made genre pieces, marine scenes, portraits, and architectural pieces. This type of oeuvre is typical for the Italian-bound artists of his day, who paid their way as a jack-of-all-trades.

== Pieter de Molijn the Younger ("Peter Tempesta") ==
According to Arnold Houbraken, Pieter de Molijn had a son Pieter (1637–1701) who could also paint quite well, but who emigrated to Rome at a young age and became a member of the Bentvueghels with the nickname Tempeest. He was thought to be a man of 50 by Isaac de Moucheron when he was in Rome (Bent name Ordenantie) in 1697. He specialized in wilde zwynenjagten, or hunting scenes, in the manner of Frans Snyders. In Genoa he was imprisoned for 16 years for killing his wife. He was visited in prison by Jan Visser, a painter from the Bentvueghels known as Slempop. When the French bombarded the city in 1684, he was set free and fled to Parma, where he lived to old age, painting with two eyeglasses, one in front of the other.

According to the art historian Marcel Roethlisberger, the nickname Pietro Tempesta was given to another Haarlemmer, the painter Pieter Mulier II, who was given the name for painting ships in stormy seas. His RKD entry indicates that the only one of his sons who became a painter of note was his pupil Anthony.
