= Harmen Hals =

Dutch painter

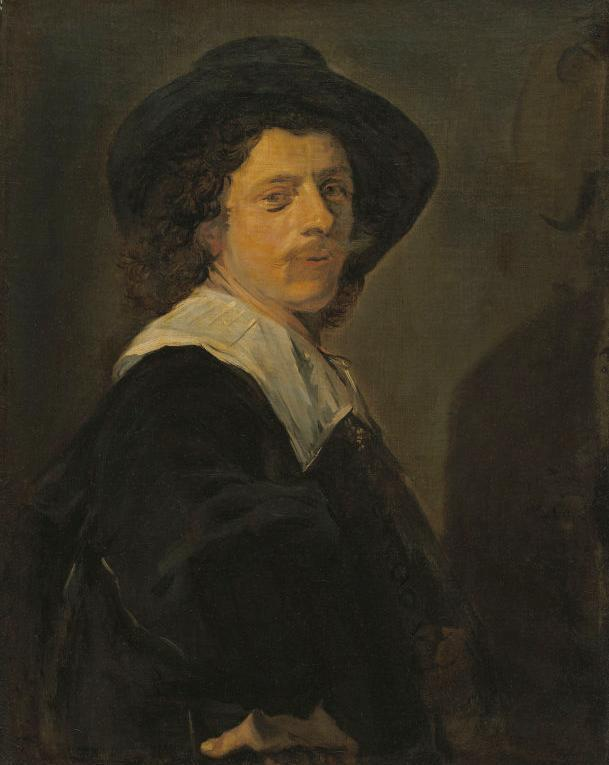
Portrait of a man, previously called Harmen Hals, aged 32 in 1633

Herman, or Harmen Hals (1611, Haarlem – 1669, Haarlem), was a Dutch Golden Age painter.

== Biography ==
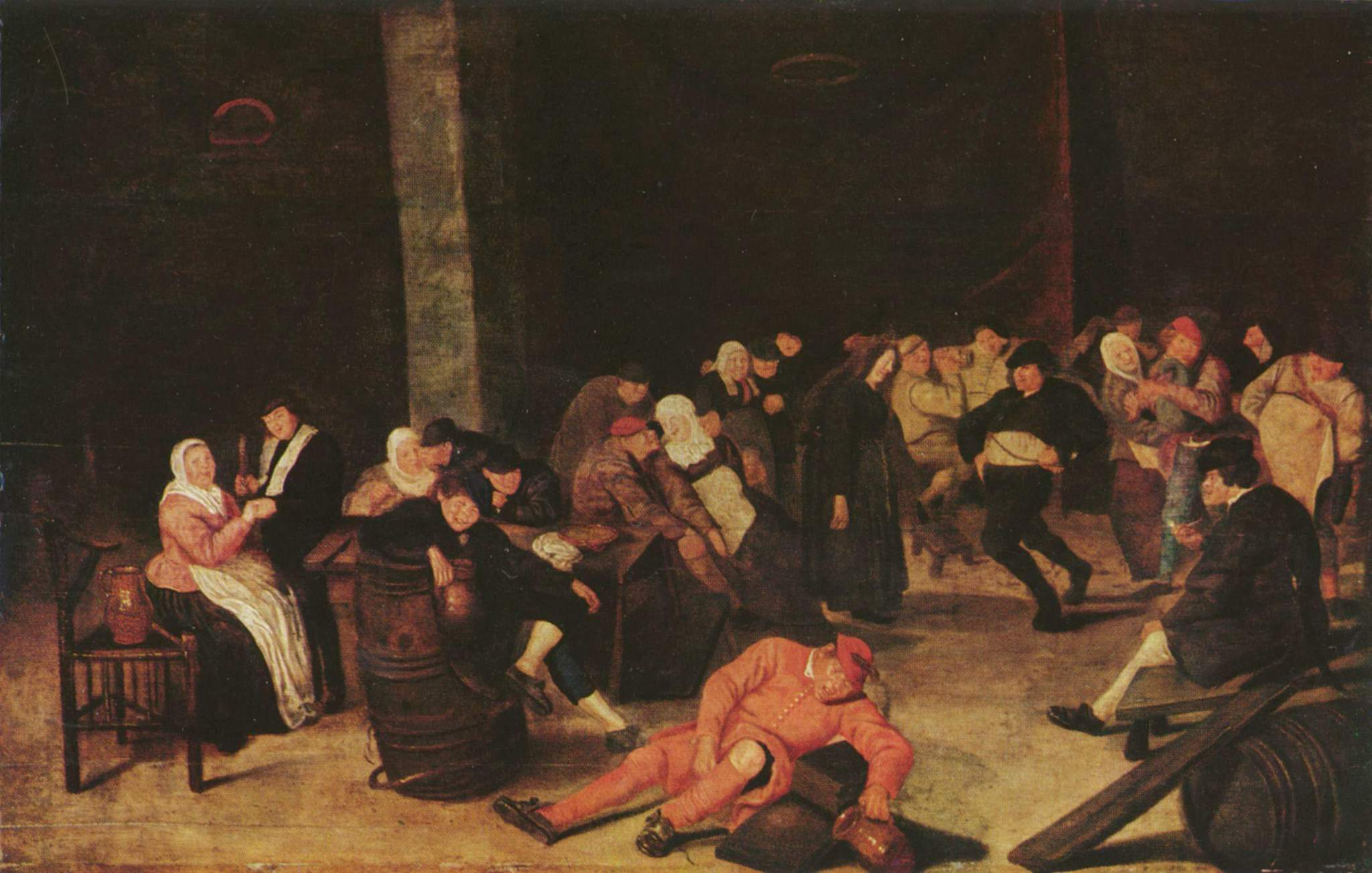
A farm wedding

According to Houbraken he was the son of the painter Frans Hals and was like his brothers Jan and Frans II, good at music and painting. He was a member of the Haarlem Guild of St. Luke.

According to the Netherlands Institute for Art History he was the oldest son of Frans Hals, and spent most of his life in Haarlem, but is registered in Vianen from 1642–45, and in Amsterdam in 1645. Works previously attributed to Adriaen Brouwer, another pupil of his father's, have since been attributed to him.
