= Frans Hals the Younger =

Dutch Golden Age painter

Frans Hals the Younger (1618, Haarlem – 1669, Haarlem), was a Dutch Golden Age painter.

== Biography ==
According to Houbraken he was the son of the painter Frans Hals and was like his brothers Harman and Jan, good at music and painting. He was a member of the Haarlem Guild of St. Luke.

According to the Netherlands Institute for Art History he painted portraits and genre works, and spent most of his life in Haarlem. He influenced the painter Alexander Sanders. Still life paintings formerly attributed to him have since been attributed to other painters. A portrait formerly attributed to him is in the collection of the Bredius Museum.
