= Van der Vinne =

Van der Vinne is a Dutch surname. Notable people with the surname include:

- Ferry van der Vinne (1886–1947), Dutch footballer
- Jan Vincentsz van der Vinne (1663–1721); 2nd son of Vincent, Dutch painter
- Laurens van der Vinne (1658–1729); first son of Vincent, Dutch painter
- Vincent Jansz van der Vinne (1736–1811); son of Jan Laurentsz and great-grandson of Vincent, Dutch painter
- Vincent Laurensz van der Vinne II (1686–1742); son of Laurens and grandson of Vincent, Dutch painter
- Vincent van der Vinne (1628–1702), Dutch painter
