= Sara van Baalbergen =

Dutch artist (1607 – after 1638)

Sara van Baalbergen (1607 – after 1638), was a Dutch Golden Age artist.

According to the Netherlands Institute for Art History (RKD) she was the first female member of the Haarlem Guild of St. Luke and was mentioned as member in the years 1631 and 1634–1638. She married the painter Barent van Eysen, who was a follower of Vincent van der Vinne, in 1634. No known works by Van Baalbergen survive, although it is assumed that she was primarily a painter.
