= Barend van Eijsen =

Dutch Golden Age painter and sculptor

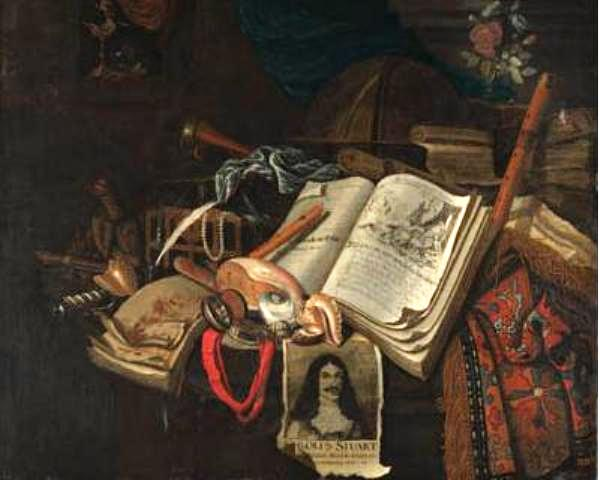
Vanitas still life after Vincent van der Vinne, attributed to Pieter van Eijsen. It has a portrait of King Charles II and book of prints "Afbeeldinghe van de Spaensche Tirannye", globe, trumpet, recorder, music book, nautilus shell, watch with red ribbon, books, and vase with roses

Barend van Eijsen (fl. 1679 in Haarlem), was a Dutch Golden Age painter and sculptor.

== Biography ==
According to the RKD, the painter B. van Eijsen was probably the same person as the sculptor Barent van Eijsen who worked in Haarlem in 1679. He is listed in the 1702 Vincent van der Vinne list as a past and deceased member of the Haarlem Guild of St. Luke.

The painter Sara van Baalbergen married a Barent van Eysen in 1634 in Haarlem, but it is unclear if he represents the same person or a member of the previous generation.

Barend probably was related to P. van Eijse, thought to be identical to Pieter van Eijsen, who was a painter active in Haarlem in the 1660s. Two works attributed to P. van Eijse are vanitas still life paintings in the style of Vincent van der Vinne dated 1661 and 1662, while another formerly attributed to Evert Collier is attributed to him.
