= Leendert van der Cooghen =

Dutch painter

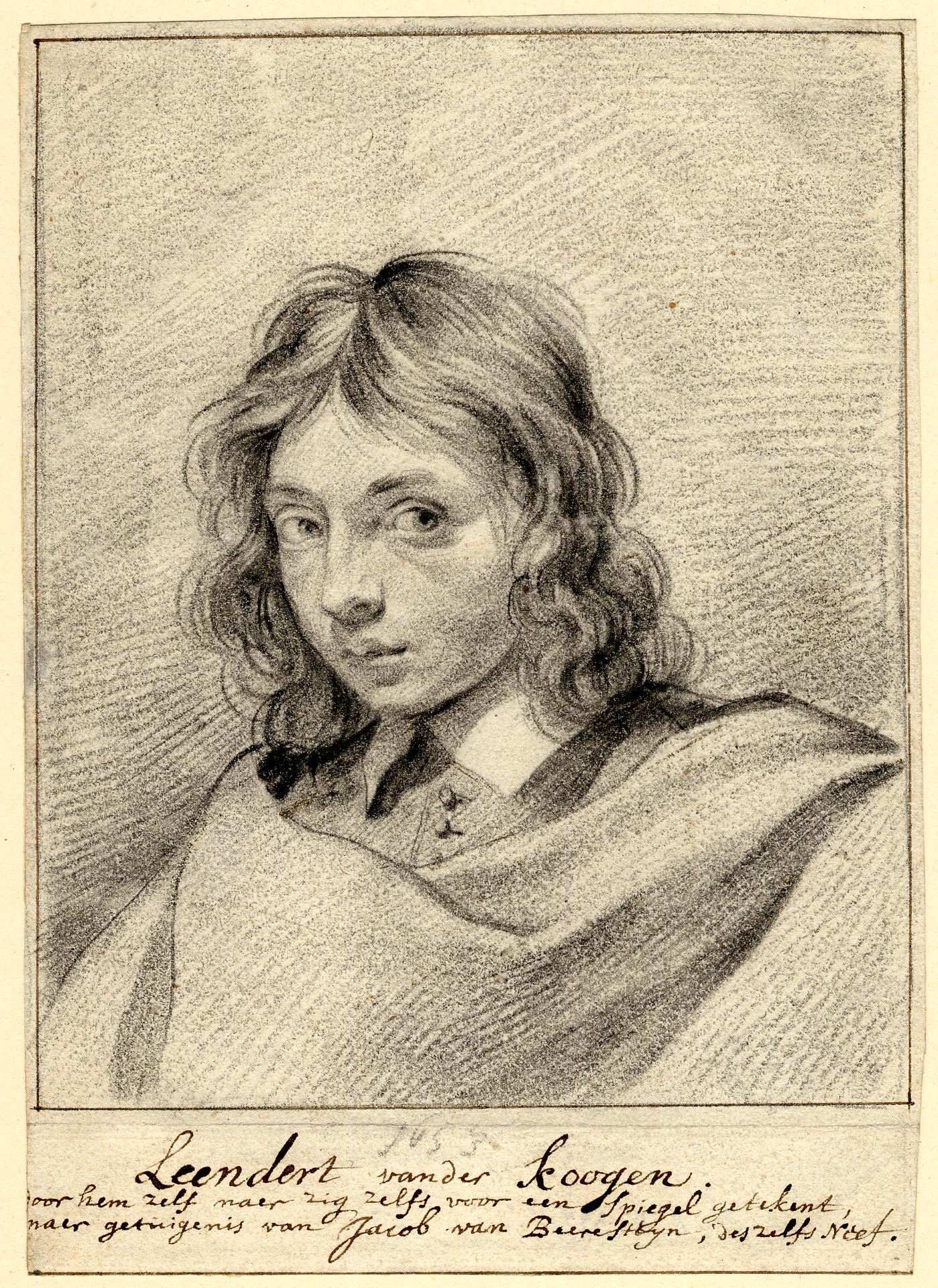
- Self-portrait at the age of 21
- Born: 9 May 1632; Haarlem
- Died: 18 February 1681 (aged 48); Haarlem
- Known for: Painting, drawing and printmaking
- Movement: Baroque

Leendert van der Cooghen (Haarlem, 9 May 1632 – Haarlem, 18 February 1681) was a Dutch painter, draughtsman and printmaker. An amateur artist of independent means, he left a small oeuvre of which his drawings represent the major portion. Recognised by his fellow artists, he was admitted to the Haarlem Guild of Saint Luke in 1652.

== Life ==
Leendert van der Cooghen was born in Haarlem on 9 May 1632 as the son of the Flemish flax merchant Jacob Adriaensz. van der Cooghen and Agneta Casteleyns Leenaerdtsdochter, from the well-to-do van Beresteyn family in Haarlem. The family was possibly Catholic as in 1648 he joined a Catholic local militia, a so-called schutterij. He is believed to have trained with the Flemish painter Jacob Jordaens, either in Antwerp in the late 1640s, or more likely during Jordaens' presence in the Dutch Republic while working on decorations in the Oranjezaal at the Huis ten Bosch.

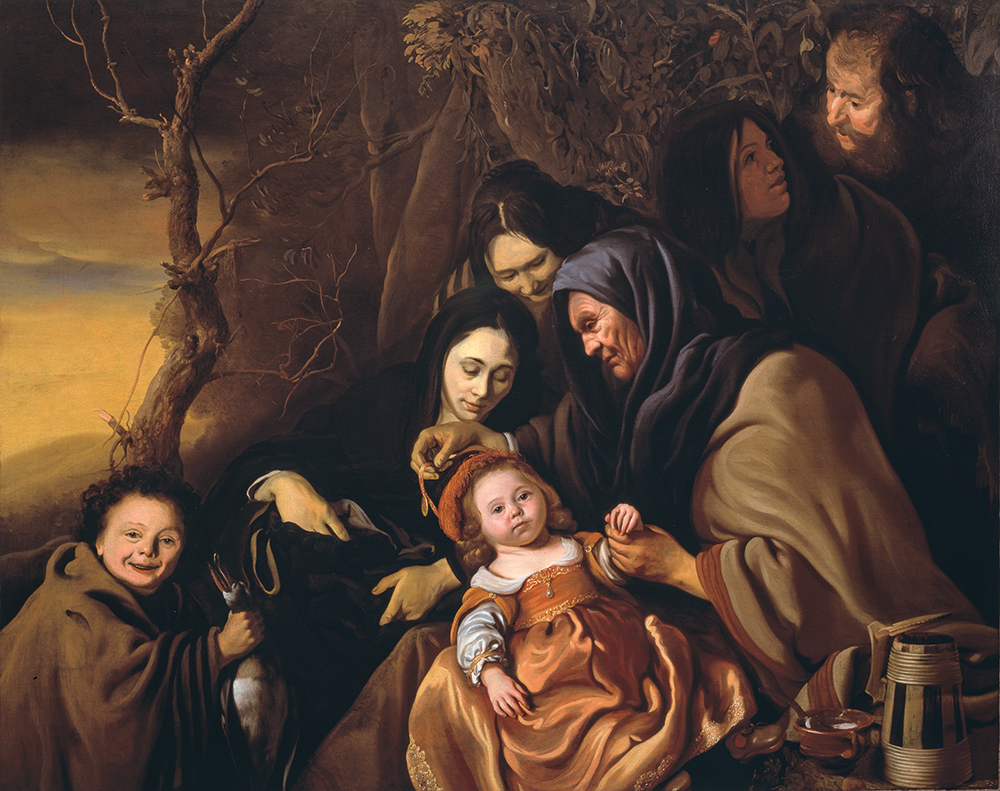
Constance (Preciosa) abducted by gypsies

Around 1650 or 1651 he became a friend of the local artist Cornelis Bega who was about his own age and gave him artistic training. They also shared a studio. He does not seem to have joined Bega when the latter and other young Haarlem artists Dirk Helmbreker, Vincent van der Vinne and Guillam Dubois travelled to Germany and Switzerland in 1650-1651. He seems never to have left his homeland after the 1650s. he was admitted to the Haarlem Guild of Saint Luke in 1652.

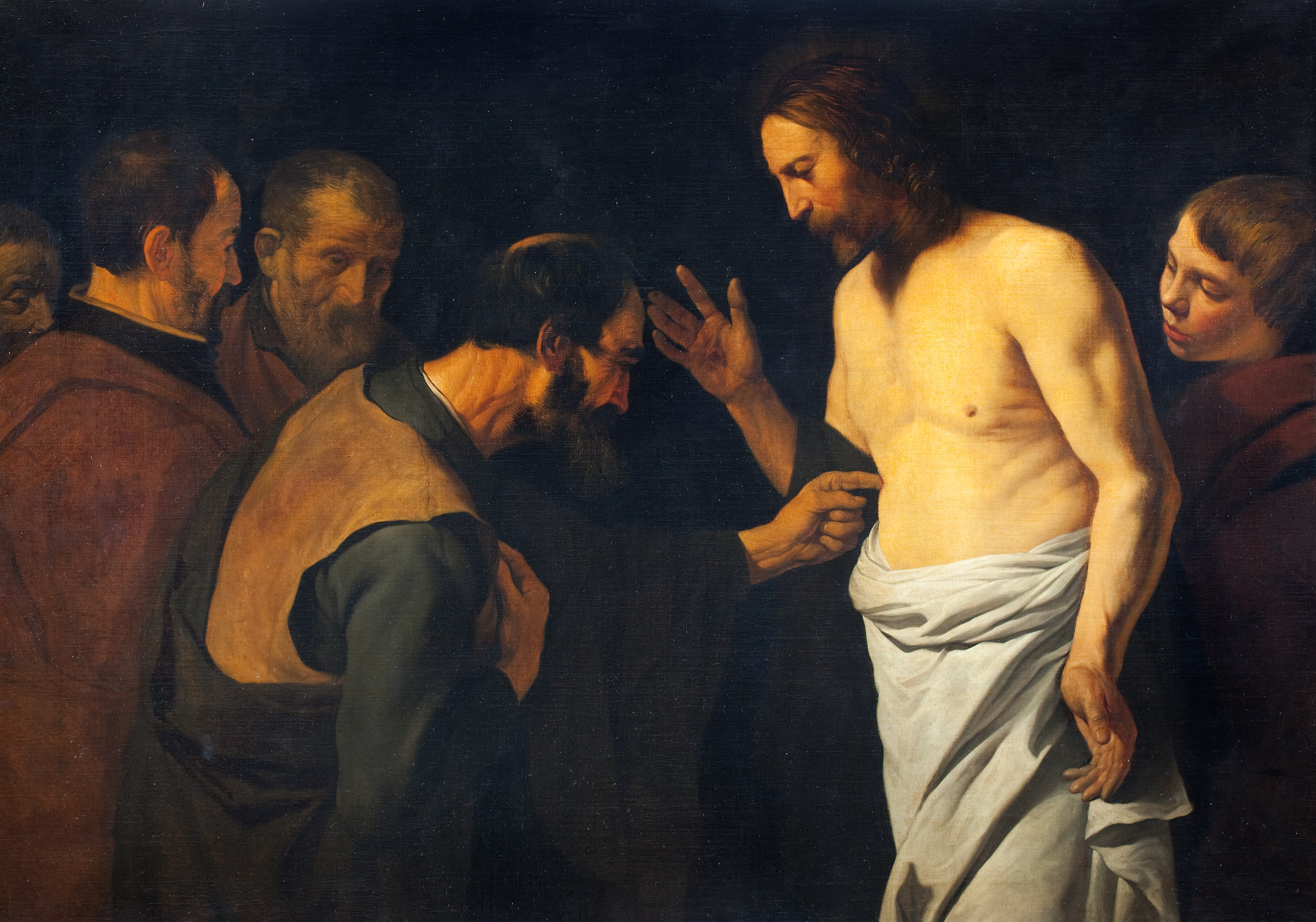
The Doubting Thomas

He befriended the Haarlem painter Vincent van der Vinne. Van der Vinne included a portrait drawing which Leendert made of him in his Vanitas Still Life with a Self-Portrait (1660, Frans Hals Museum). Accompanied by the motto 'Memento Mori' (Latin for 'remember that you [have to] die'), this drawing recurs in another Vanitas still life with a portrait of the painter by van der Vinne dated 1664 (Tajan Paris auction of 9 December 1996, lot 20).

As through his mother he was a member of the van Beresteyn family, he was financially independent and was an amateur rather than a professional artist. This was likely the reason for his limited artistic output. As an amateur artist he never had to sell any of his works to make a living and there is no record of him ever having worked on commission. He lived in the inherited family home Ter Goes in the Schagelstraat in Haarlem, together with his sister Catharina. He never married and his bachelor status earned him the nickname 'uncle Leendert'.

After an illness, he died on 18 February 1681 and was buried four days later in the Grote Kerk (formerly the St. Bavo's Church) in Haarlem.

== Work ==
=== General ===
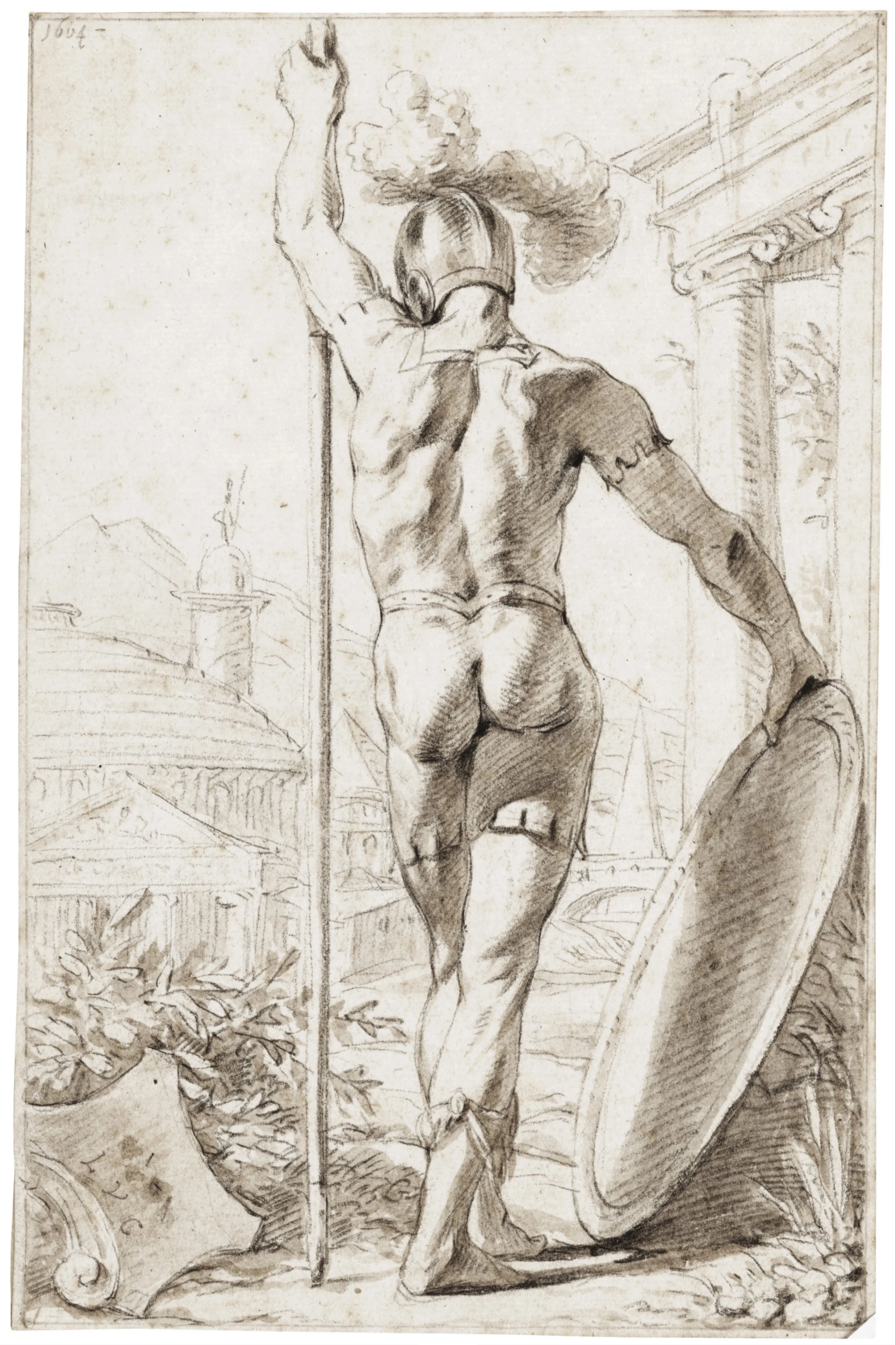
Mars seen from behind

The early Dutch biographer Arnold Houbraken stated that van der Cooghen was a painter of landscapes, portraits, and genre pieces. Only about three paintings are attributed to van der Cooghen with certainty, all made in the 1650s. He is best known for his drawings of which about 60 have been identified. The art historian Baukje J. L. Coenen has attributed about 66 drawings to him. Van Cooghen also made 10 etchings in the period 1664-1666.

=== Paintings ===
Three paintings are with certainty attributed to van der Cooghen, the Doubting Thomas (signed and dated 1654, Mauritshuis), the Adoration of the shepherds, (signed and dated 1656, Frans Hals Museum ) and the Constance (Preciosa) abducted by gypsies (1650s, formerly in the Bailey Art Museum in Charlotteville, Virginia). The latter work was inspired by the story popularised in Cervantes' novella La gitanilla ("The Little Gypsy Girl') first published in 1613. It tells the story of the noble girl Preciosa who is abducted and raised by a Roma family. The nobleman Don Juan falls in love with her and finally her true high birth is discovered. The story was transposed by the Dutch poet Jacob Cats in verse in his Het Spaense Heydinnetje ('The Spanish heathen girl') published in 1637. This theme was very popular in Dutch 17th-century art. While most Dutch painters treated either the moment of Don Juan's first encounter with Preciosa or the revelation of her true identity, van der Cooghen painted the moment in which the girl is abducted by the Roma family. As was common in depictions of the period, he contrasts the white skin of the baby girl with those of the darker skinned Roma. The large figures in his painting of the Doubting Thomas betray the influence of his teacher Jacob Jordaens. The painting is based on the story in the New Testament which recounts of the apostle Thomas who expresses doubts that the person he sees in front of him is truly Jesus who has arisen after his crucifixion and death. Jesus allows him to touch the wound in his side to prove he is really Jesus. This story was popular with Catholics during the Counter Reformation. While Protestants believe that a person can be 'saved' only through faith (sola fide), Roman Catholics liked to go back to this story which highlights how the Jesus character in the story was ready to provide tangible evidence to a doubting person like Thomas.

=== Drawings ===
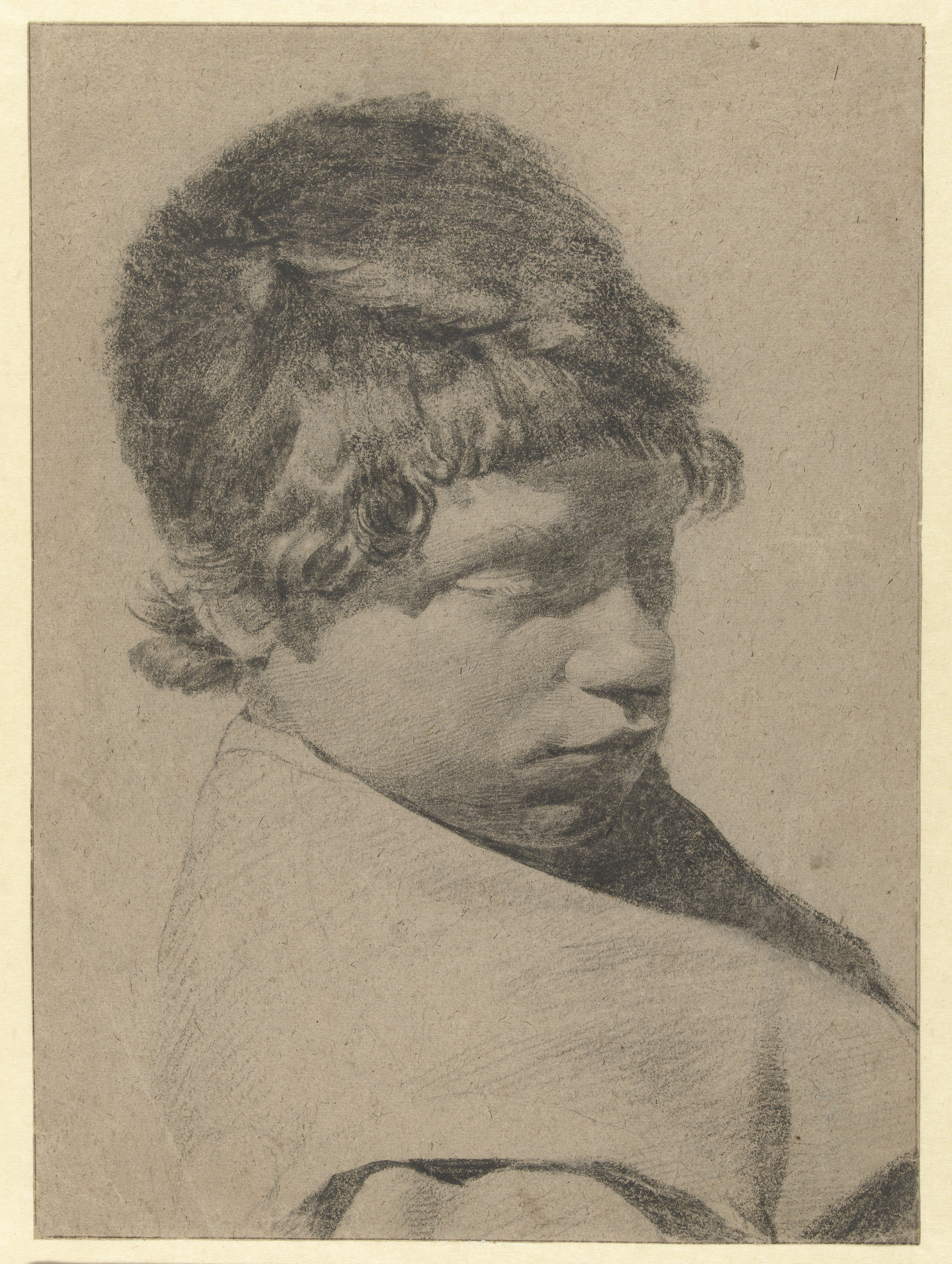
Bust of a boy

His body of drawings consists mainly of figure and portrait studies and some genre scenes and landscapes. His drawings share similarities with other Haarlem artists of his time such as Bega, Dirk Helmbreker and van der Vinne. Their drawings are characterized by the tight, even hatching, dry handling of the chalk and the unusual lightning. He also usually worked directly from a life model. He favored head-and-shoulders and bust-length formats for his female sitters. His models usually occupy the whole space of the drawing and are rendered in an idealized manner. The sitters typically look at the viewer and are motionless, even when depicted in groups. His hatching is usually in one direction, and is similar to that used in etchings.

Van Cooghen added the day, month and year on 46 of his surviving drawings. This has allowed to establish a chronology. His style appears to have moved from a rather static and dry style to a looser and free-er style with bolder strokes and more movement. In his early drawings he used either red or black chalk on paper and rarely combined the two colors in one drawing. From 1654 he used either only black chalk sometimes in conjunction with pen and brown or black ink and wash or pen and ink on their own. He also used wet black chalk or oiled chalk or charcoal. His red and black drawings (all dating to the first half of the 1650s) are close to the Flemish style of his master Jordaens and Jan Cossiers. In his early career he made several copies after Jordaens as well after antique sculptures. He made watercolors but no examples of these are currently identified. Some of his drawings are studies for his prints.

=== Prints ===
His printed oeuvre encompasses no more than ten etchings all dated from 1664 to 1666. The subjects include Christ as a man of sorrows, Saint Sebastian, Saint Bavo with a falcon, four studies of warriors (after Salvator Rosa), a Woman bearing a jug, Bust of a woman and Trictrac players.
