= Cornelis Pietersz Bega =

Dutch Golden Age painter and engraver

Cornelis Bega
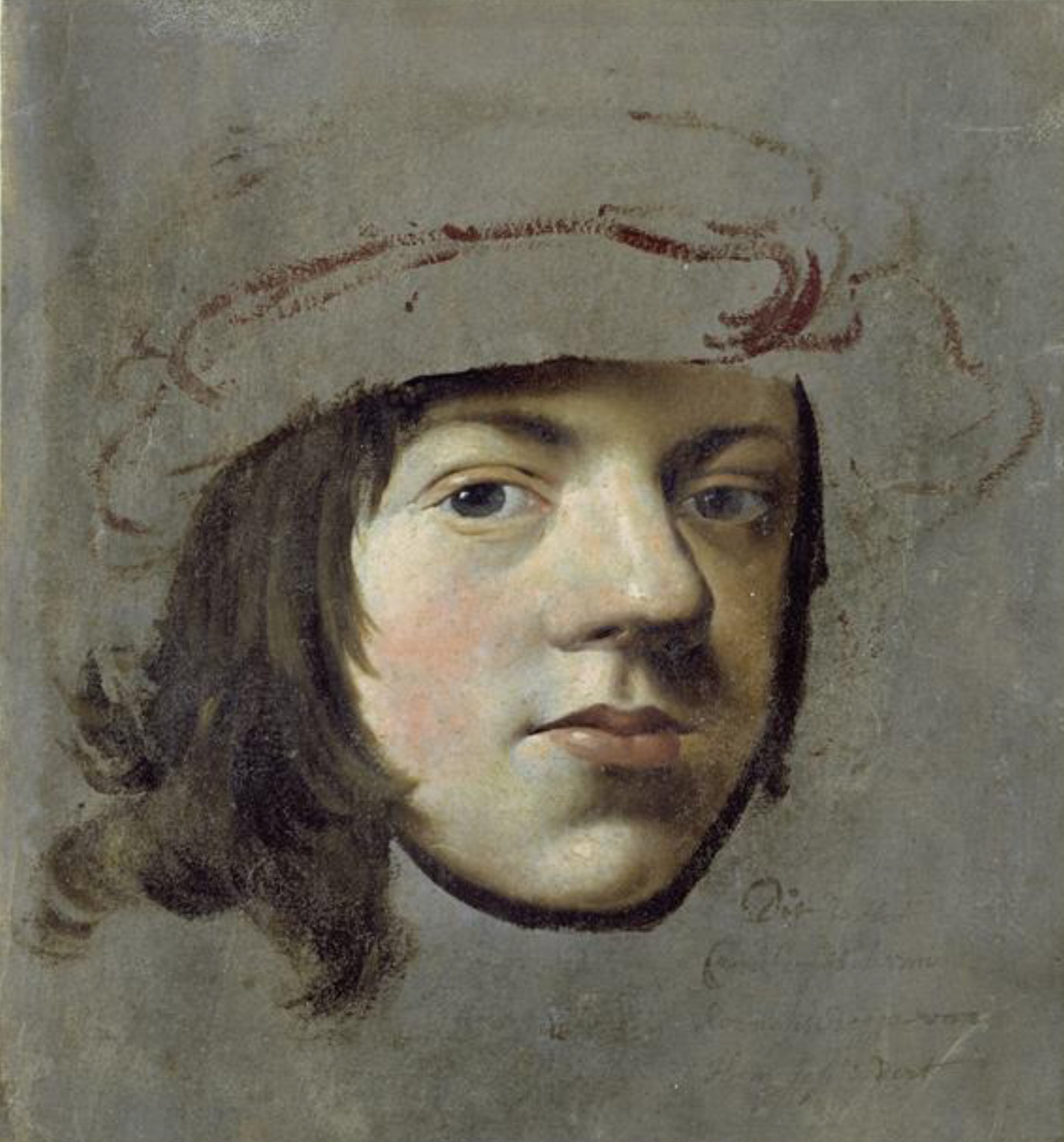
- Self-portrait
- Born: Cornelis Pietersz Bega c. 1631-2; Haarlem, Netherlands
- Died: 27 August 1664
- Known for: Painting, Engraving
- Movement: Baroque

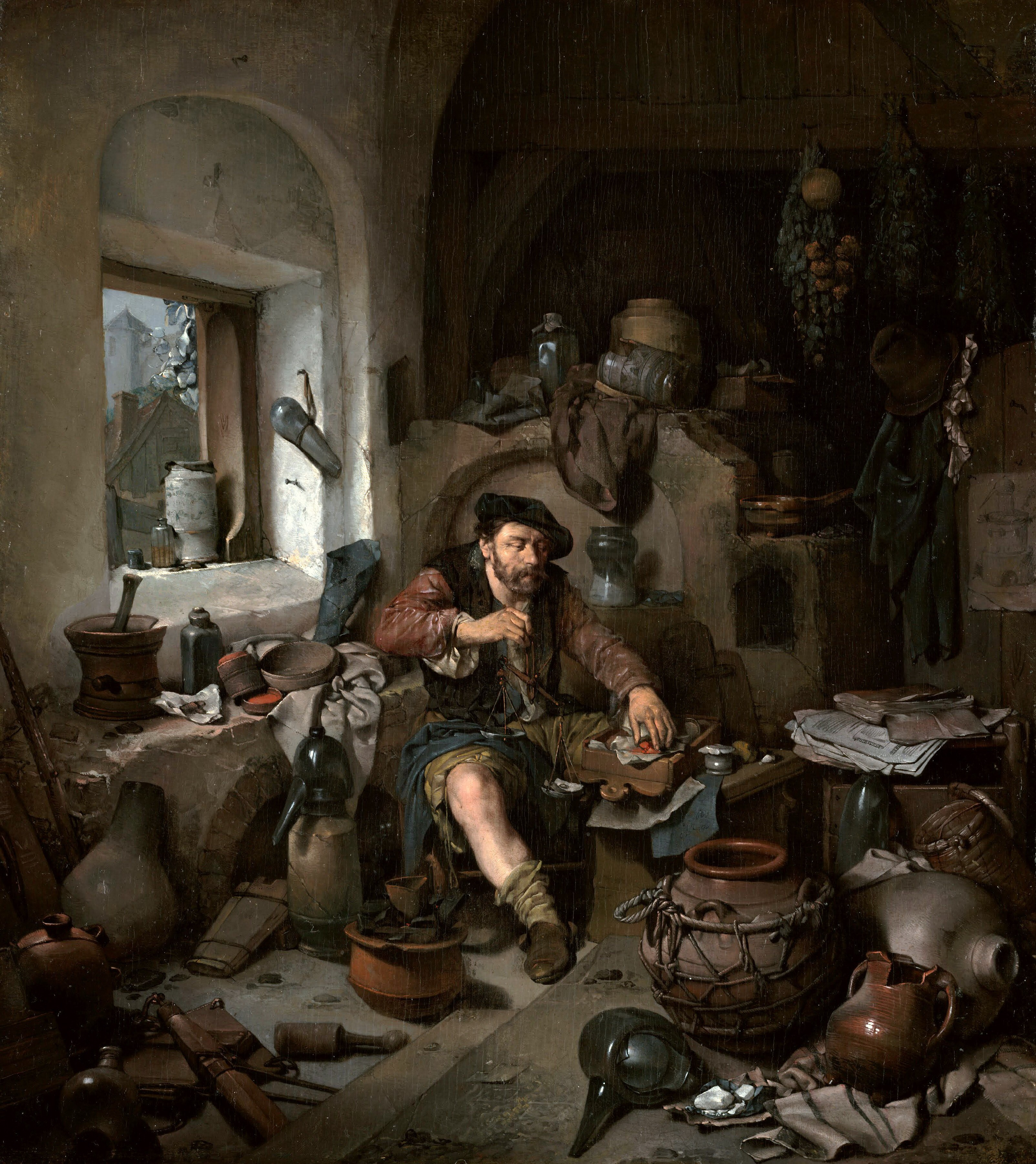
The Alchemist, 1663

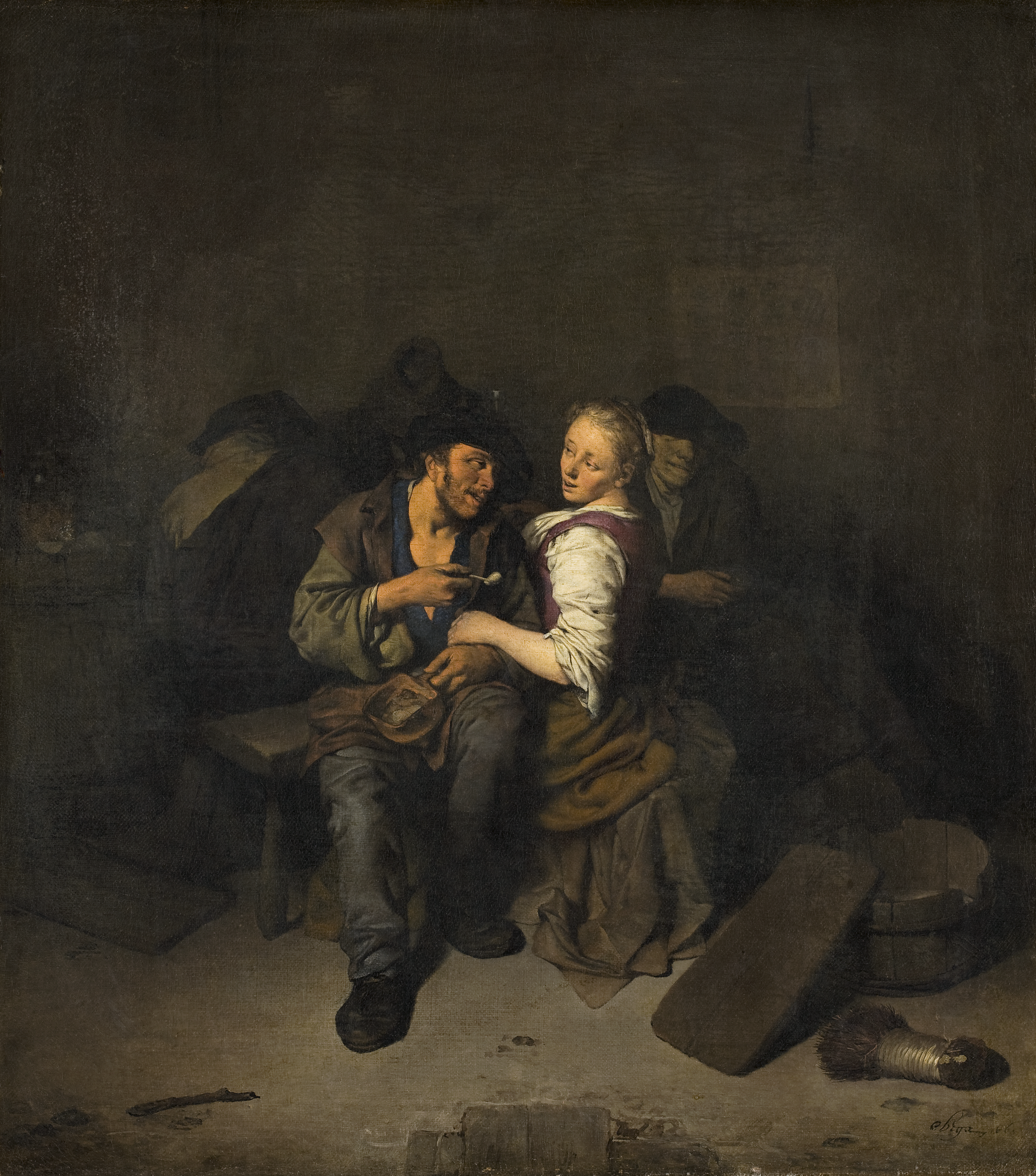
Young Couple in a Tavern, by Cornelis Bega. Oil on canvas, 1661, Hallwyl Museum.

Cornelis Pietersz Bega, or Cornelis Pietersz Begijn (1631/32 – 27 August 1664) was a Dutch Golden Age painter and engraver.

Bega was born, lived and worked in Haarlem and was the son of sculptor and goldsmith Pieter Jansz. Begijn. His mother Maria was the illegitimate daughter of the Haarlem painter Cornelis van Haarlem. He assumed the name Bega when he started working professionally. He was a student of Adriaen van Ostade, and produced genre scenes of similar subjects, typically groups of a few peasant figures, often in interior settings, or fanciful figures such as The Alchemist (Malibu) or The Astrologer (London).

From 1653 to 1654 he traveled by horse and boat on a Grand Tour with fellow painters Dirk Helmbreker, Vincent van der Vinne and Guillam Dubois through Germany, Switzerland and France. This trip was recorded in Vincent van der Vinne's diaries and gives an accurate view of the art in the cities they visited in those times. His dated works begin in 1652, and in 1654 he was accepted into the Haarlem Guild of St. Luke, dying only ten years later, which according to Houbraken was due to the plague. He was close friends with the Haarlem painter Leendert van der Cooghen. When he died he was buried in the grave of his grandfather Cornelis van Haarlem.
