= Evert Collier =

Dutch painter

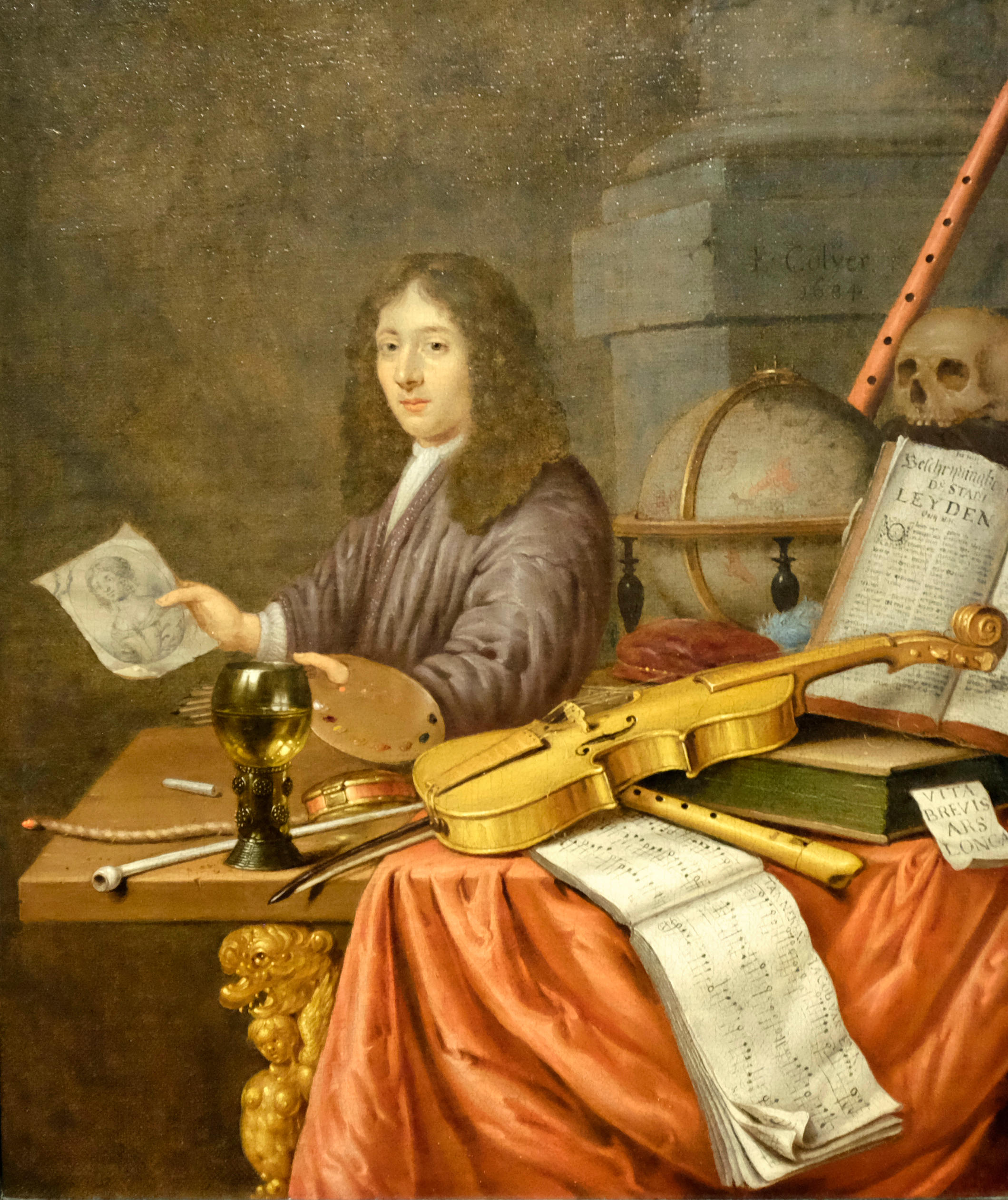
Evert Collier's oil on canvas Self-portrait with a Vanitas Still-life, 1684, Honolulu Museum of Art

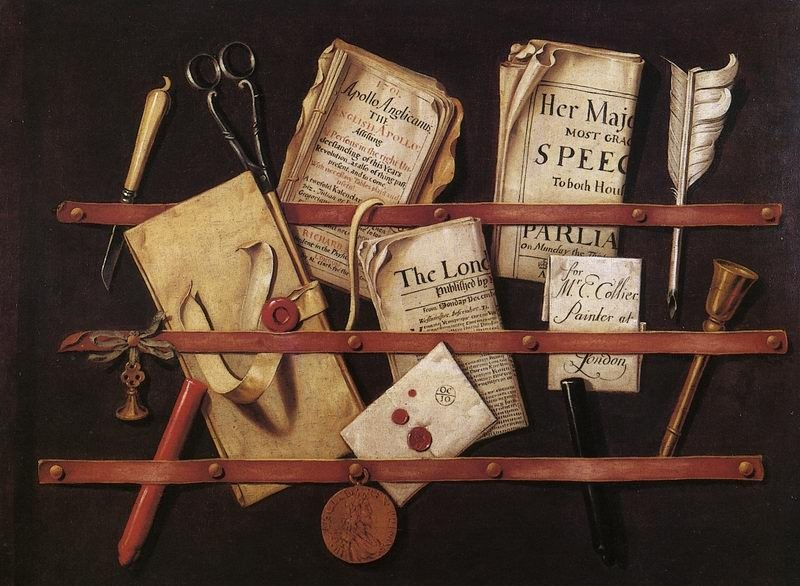
Edward Collier's trompe-l'œil painting

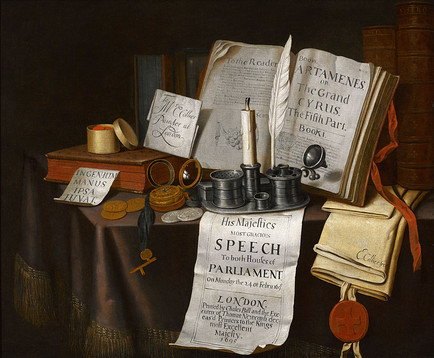
Edward Collier's vanitas entitled Parliament, Circa 1695

Evert Collier (26 January 1642 – few days before 8 September 1708) was a Dutch Golden Age still-life painter known for vanitas and trompe-l'œil paintings. His first name is sometimes spelled "Edward" or "Edwaert" or "Eduwaert" or "Edwart," and his last name is sometimes spelled "Colyer" or "Kollier".

== Life ==
Collier was baptized Evert Calier in Breda, North Brabant. He was trained in Haarlem, where his earliest paintings show the influence of Vincent Laurensz van der Vinne, who became a member of the Haarlem Guild of St. Luke in 1649, and whose son Laurens van der Vinne listed "Evert Colier" in 1702 as one of the Haarlem guild members who had known his father. Van der Vinne was probably his teacher when Collier registered with the Haarlem guild in 1664. They both later influenced the Haarlem still-life painter Barend van Eisen.

By 1667, Collier had moved to Leiden, where he became a member of the Leiden Guild of St. Luke in 1673. He moved to Amsterdam by 1686 and to London in 1693. He returned to Leiden in the years 1702–1706, based on signed and dated works there, but was back in London at the end of his life where he was buried September 8, 1708 at St. James's, Piccadilly.

The Denver Art Museum, the Honolulu Museum of Art, the Indianapolis Museum of Art, the National Portrait Gallery (United Kingdom), the Rijksmuseum (Amsterdam), the Art Institute of Chicago and the Tate (London) are among the public collections having paintings by Evert Collier.

The US historian, Dror Wahrman, has written a book on Collier's trompe-l'œil works, Mr. Collier's Letter Racks (OUP, 2014). The book brings together a wide range of the painter's still lifes from the late 17th and early 18th centuries, mostly from the time when Collier was living in London. Their themes were almost exclusively arrangements of journals, engravings, letters, medals, combs, sealing wax sticks and other ephemera, signifying an updating of the older memento mori still life model.

== Works ==
His works tend to be an arrangement of pieces of paper painted to "pop out" of the surface in a trompe-l'œil fashion. Like Van der Vinne before him, he often included prints, but these tended to be popular prints of the day.

An oil on canvas painting (Vanitas Still Life with Globe, Skull and Violin) previously attributed to Collier was later attributed to Pieter Legouch.

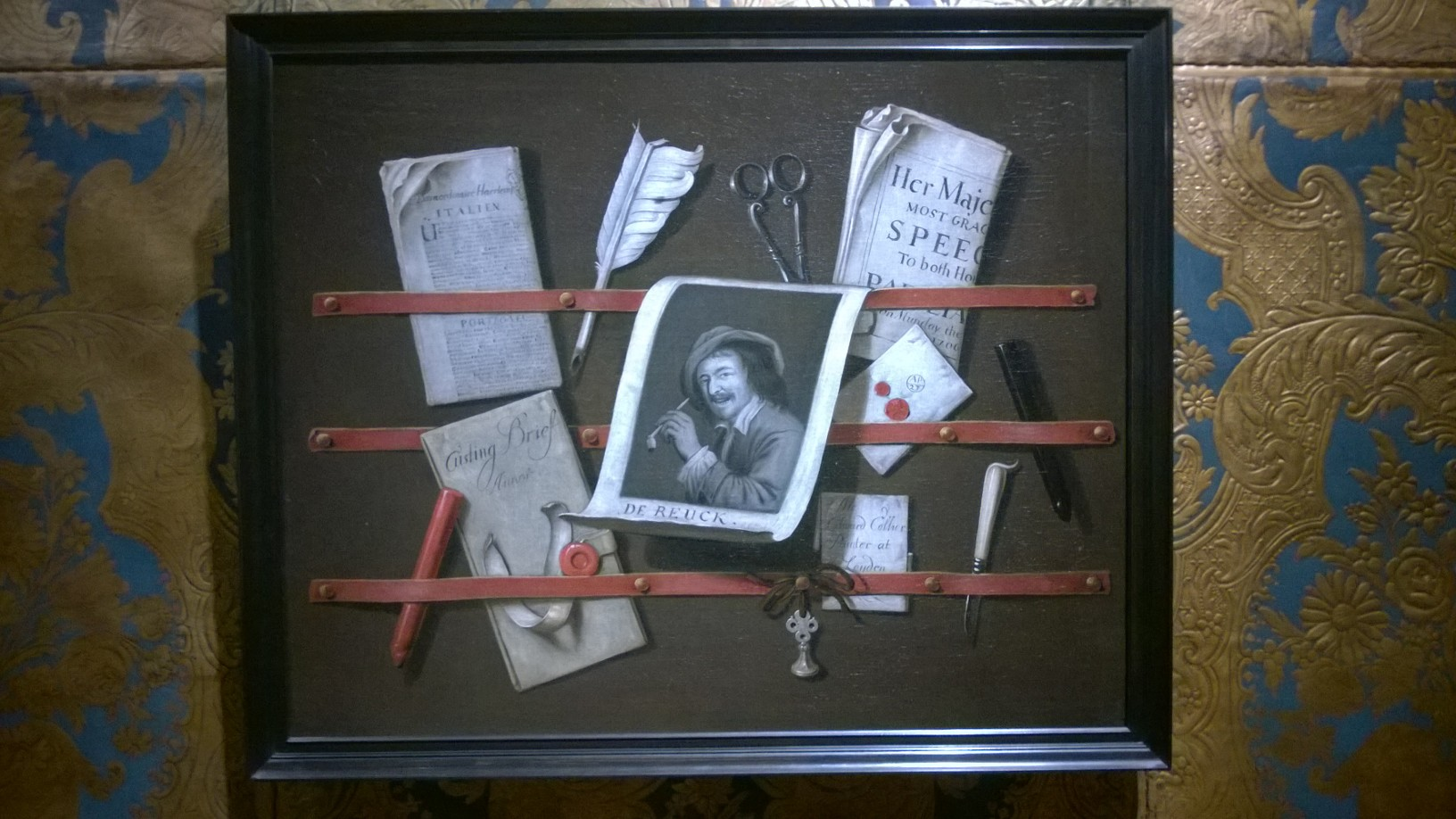
A trompe-l'œil still life of a letter rack, 54 x 67.3 cm, includes a print after Staverenus

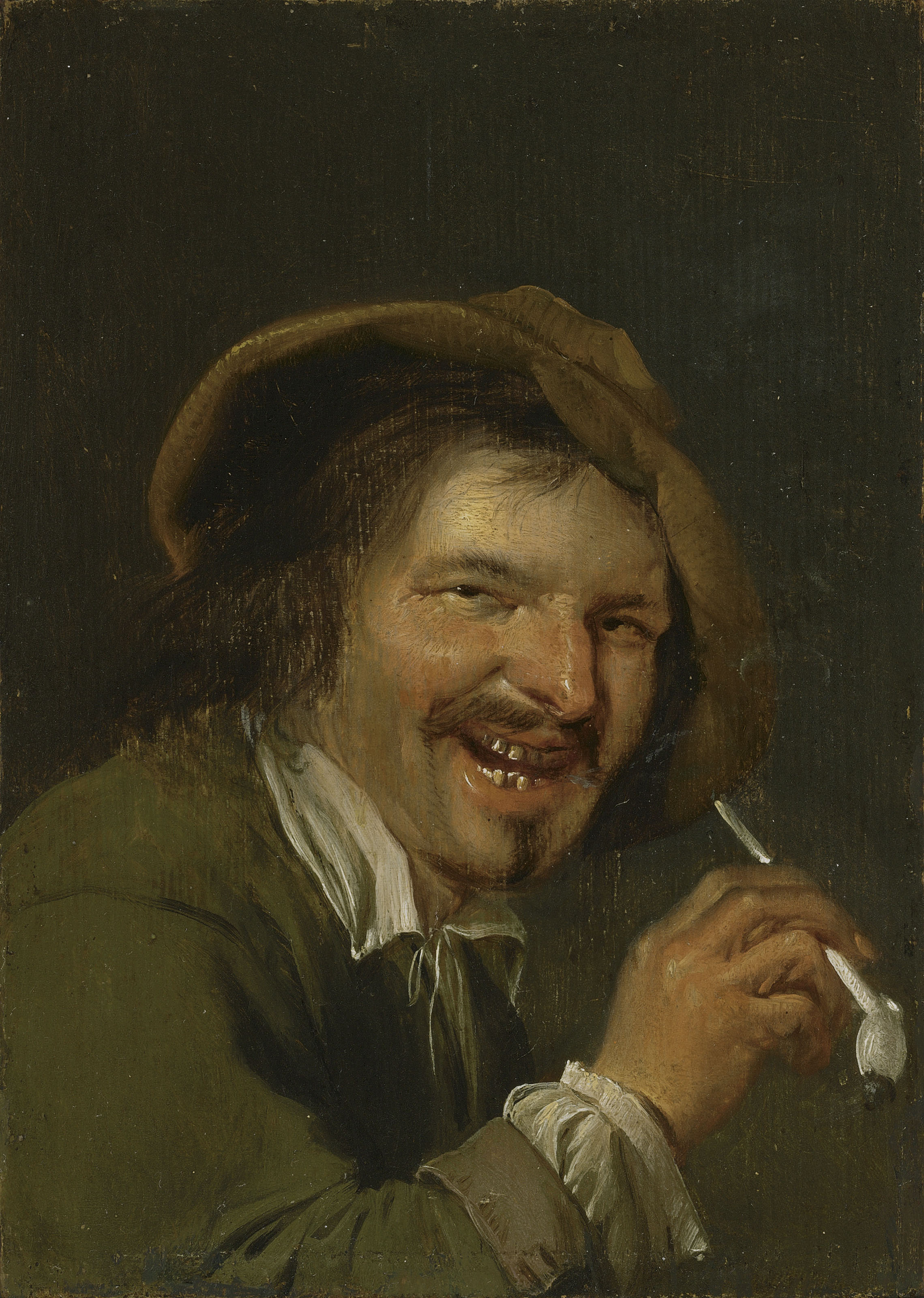
Smell, c. 1650, by Petrus Staverenus
1. A Trompe-l'œil of Newspapers, Letters and Writing Implements on a Wooden Board (1699), 58.8 × 46.2 cm
2. Edward Collier (1683), Oil on Canvas, 44.4 × 52.8 cm
3. Still Life (1699), Oil on Canvas, 76.2 × 63.5 cm
4. Still Life: The Smell (1695), Oil on Canvas, 24 5/8 × 20 1/2 in
5. Still Life: Parliament (1695), Oil on Canvas, 24 1/2 x 29 3/4 in, M.S. Rau Antiques, New Orleans
6. Still Life with a volume of Wither's Emblemes (1696), Oil on Canvas, 83.8 × 107.9 cm
7. A Vanitas
8. Vanitas (1662), Oil on Wood, 94 × 112.1 cm
9. Vanitas Still Life (1684), Oil on Canvas, 99 × 123 cm
10. Self Portrait with Vanitas Still Life (1684), Oil on Canvas, Honolulu Museum of Art
11. A Vanitas Still Life with a Flag, Candlestick, Musical Instruments, Books, Writing Paraphernalia, Globes, and Hourglass(1662), Oil on Canvas

== Notes ==
Attribution:
