= Petrus Staverenus =

Dutch painter

- Born: circa 1615
- Died: circa 1660
- Known for: Painting
- Movement: Baroque

Petrus Staverenus (fl. 1624 – 1654) was a Dutch painter, who painted tronies in the manner of Frans Hals and Adriaen Brouwer.

Little is known of his life. He became a member of the Confrerie Pictura in 1635. He is best known today for engravings by Abraham Blooteling, Jan Verkolje and others, mostly depicting his expressive heads of people in various activities. The Museum Bredius has one of his notebooks in their collection.

The five senses, A woman pointing (sight), engraved by Jan Verkolje:

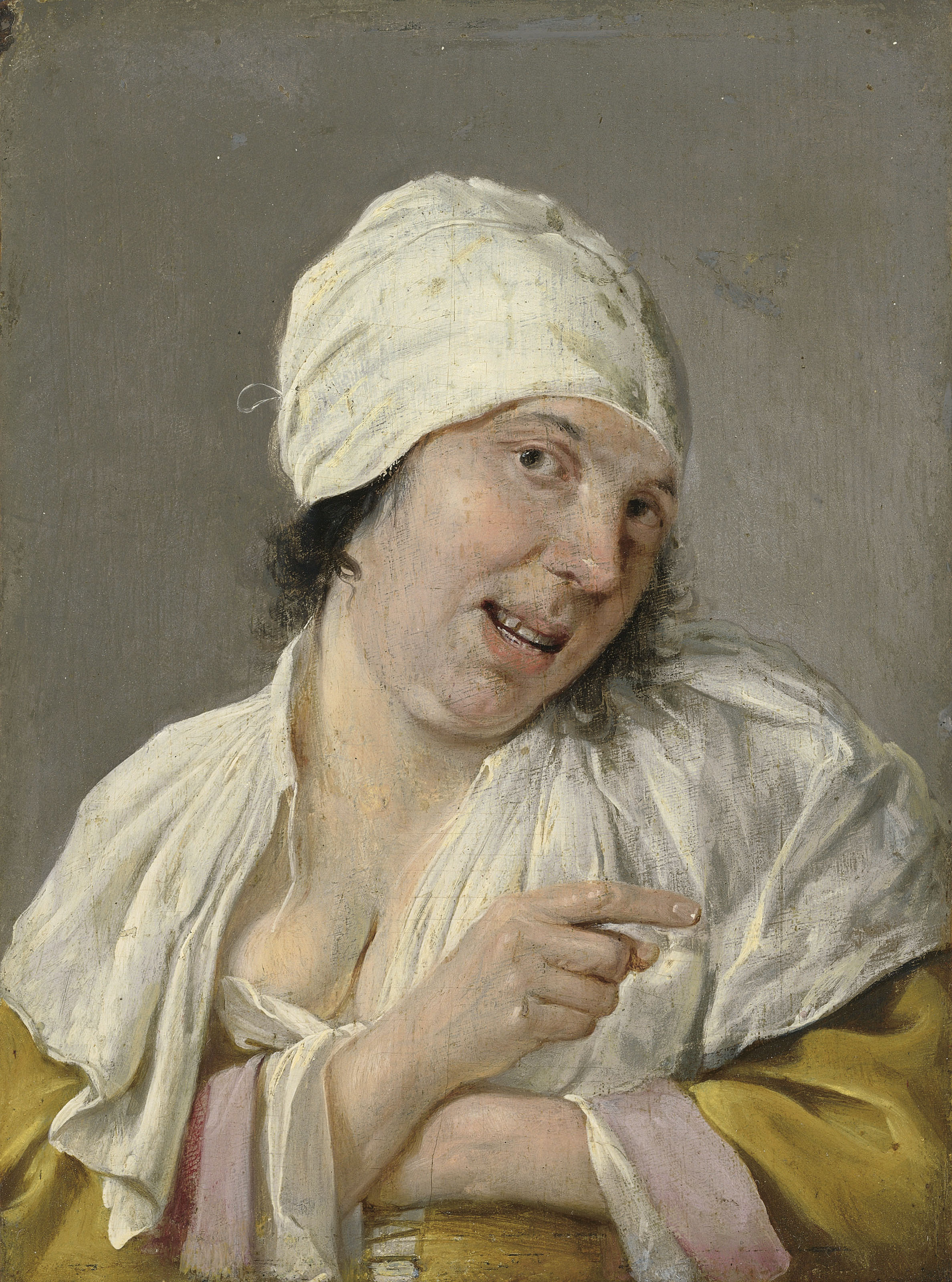

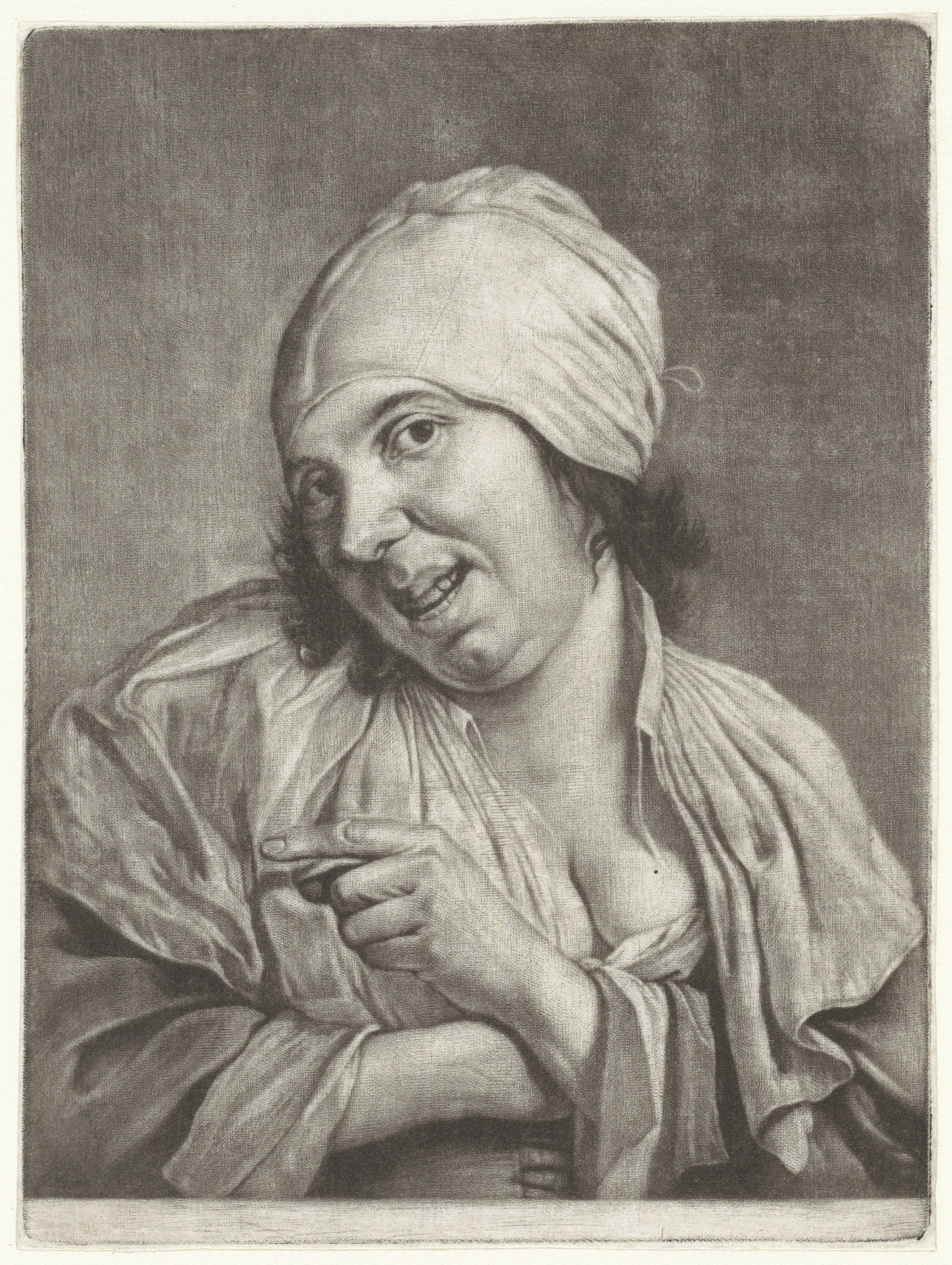

The five senses, A man smoking (smell), an engraving of which is included in a trompe-l'œil painting by Evert Collier:

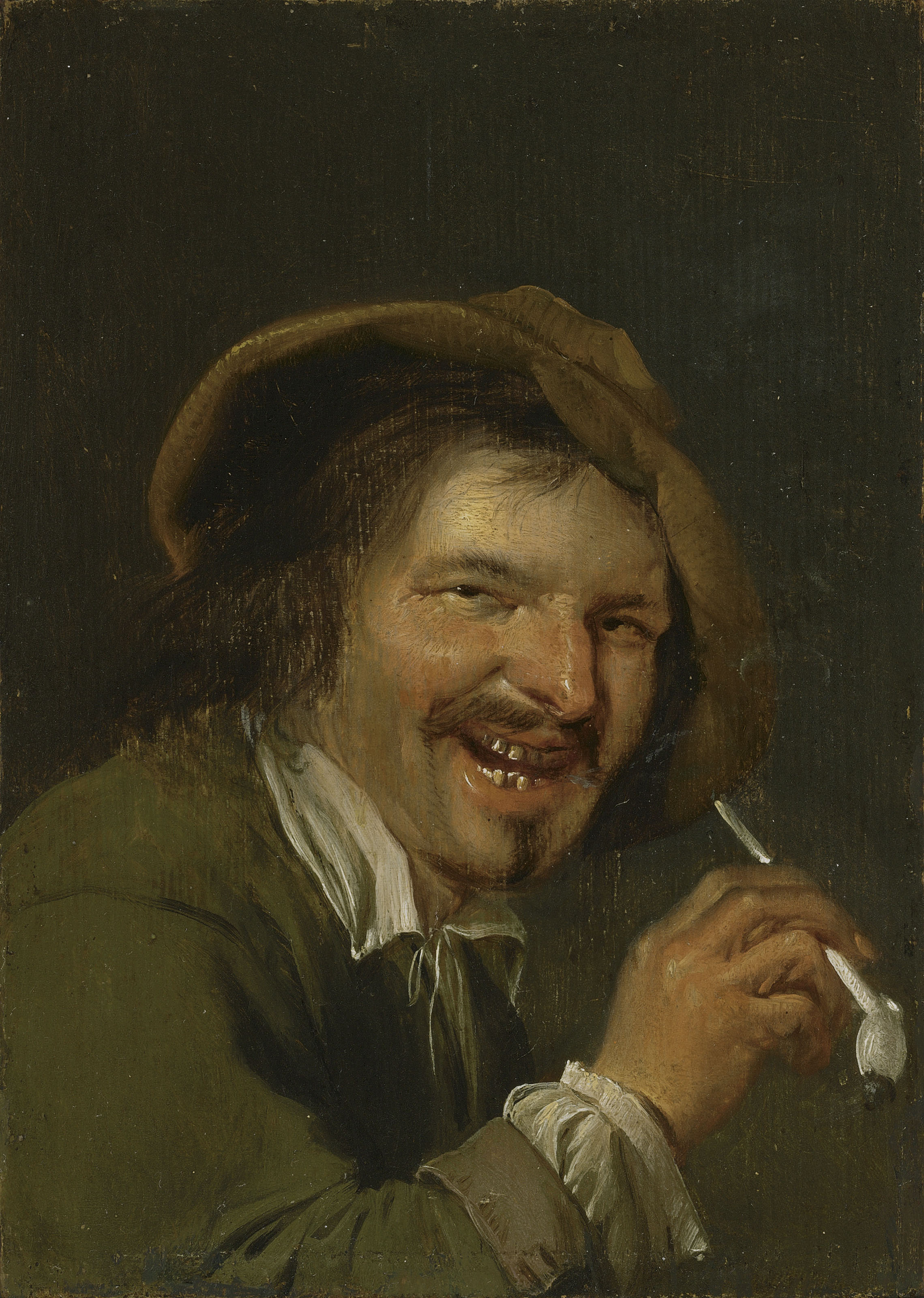

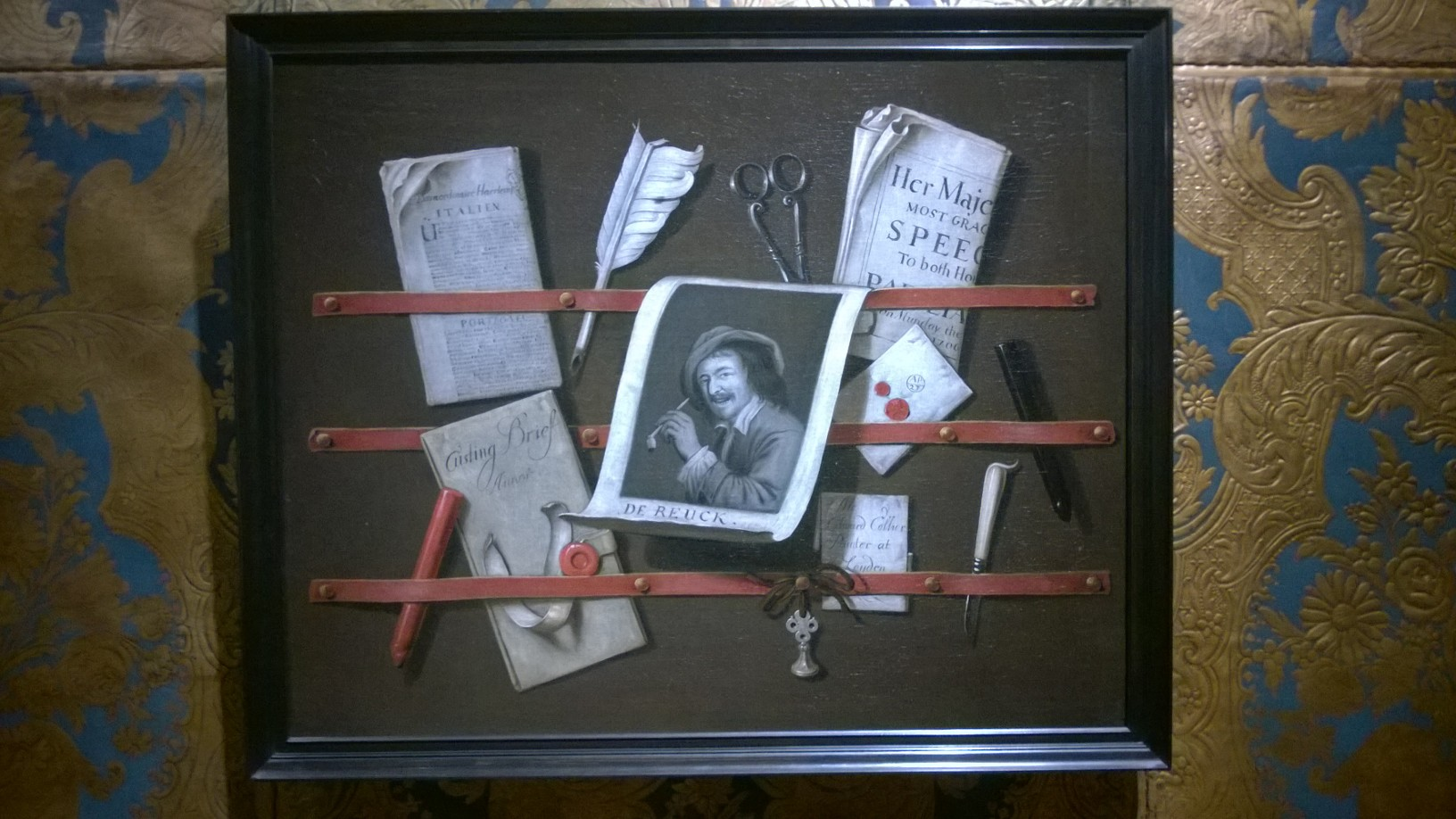
