= An Astrologer =

1663 painting by Cornelis Bega

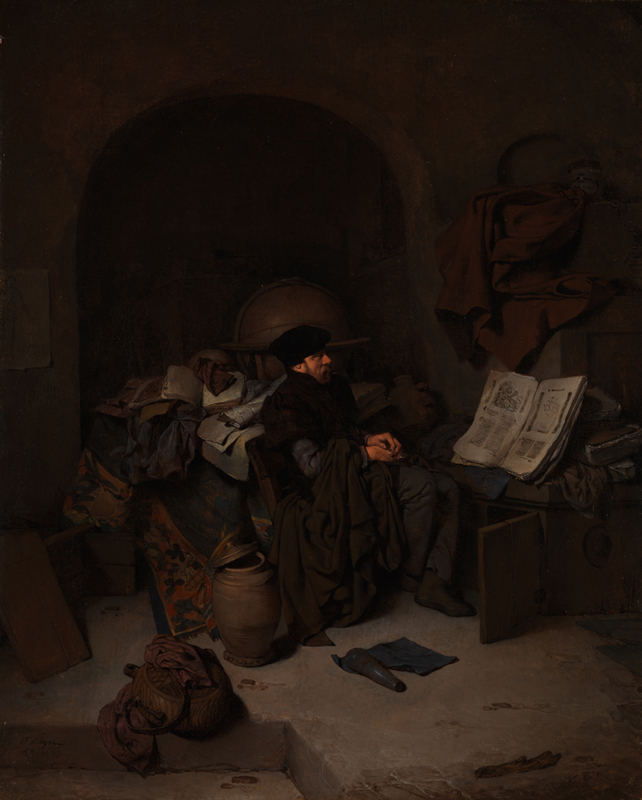
An Astrologer (1663) by Cornelis Bega

An Astrologer is a 1663 oil on panel painting by the Dutch artist Cornelis Bega, now in the National Gallery, London, to which it was presented by Martin Henry Colnaghi in 1896.
