= Pieter Legouch =

Dutch painter

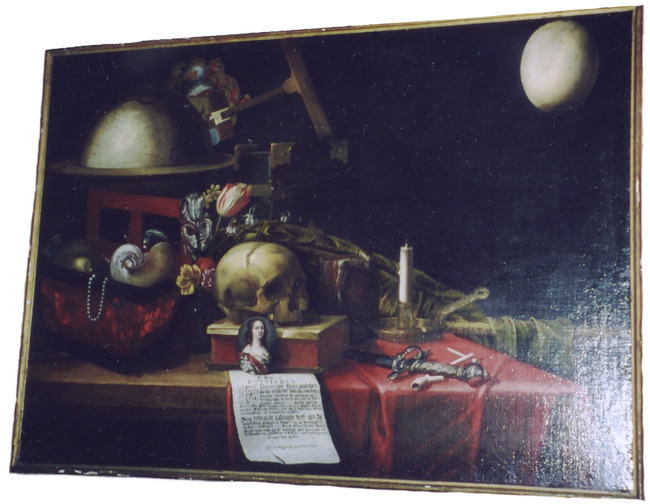
Vanitas Still Life with Globe and Ostrich Egg, oil on canvas, 1663

Pieter Legouch (? – November 1664 (buried 22 November 1664)) also Legoes, was a Flemish-born Dutch Golden Age still-life painter. His best known works are vanitas still lifes.

== Biography ==
=== Name ===
His name is variously spelled Pieter Legouch, Pieter le Goes, Pieter le Gouch, Peeter le Goust, Pieter Le Goes, Pieter Le Gouch, Peeter Le Goust, Pieter Legoes, and Peeter Legoust.

Another painter active in Antwerp in the same period, Pieter Cornelisz., also known as "Legouch", was called "van Hoeck".

=== Early life ===
Pieter (Daniëlsz) Legouch was born in Lokeren, Southern Netherlands, in the late 16th century or early 17th century.

He moved to Antwerp, where he studied under Nicolaes Lamourlet.

He then moved to the Netherlands. An artist called Pieter Legoes was active in Delft in 1648, possibly the same person.

Between 1651 and 1664 he worked and lived in Middelburg, in Zeeland. He entered the local Guild of Saint Luke. He remained in Middelburg until his death.

He was buried in Middelburg on 22 November 1664.

Perhaps is favorite subject were still lifes, especially vanitas. An oil on canvas painting, which was attributed to Legouch in the 2000s, Vanitasstilleven met globe, schedel en viool ("Vanitas Still Life with Globe, Skull and Violin"), had been previously attributed to Edwaert Collier.

== Gallery ==
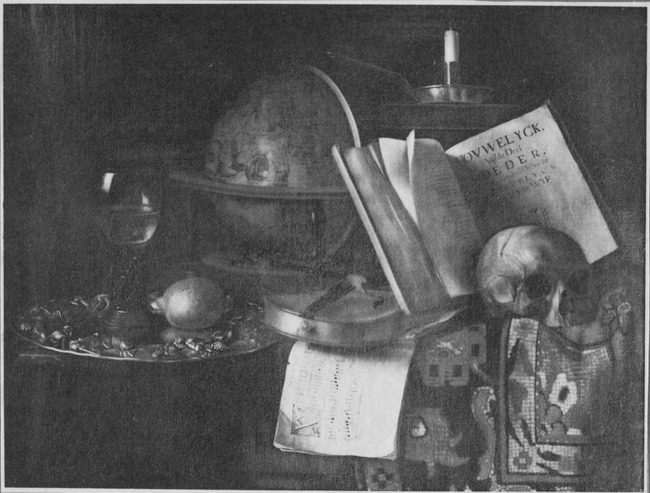
Vanitas Still Life with Globe, Skull and Violin, c. 1660

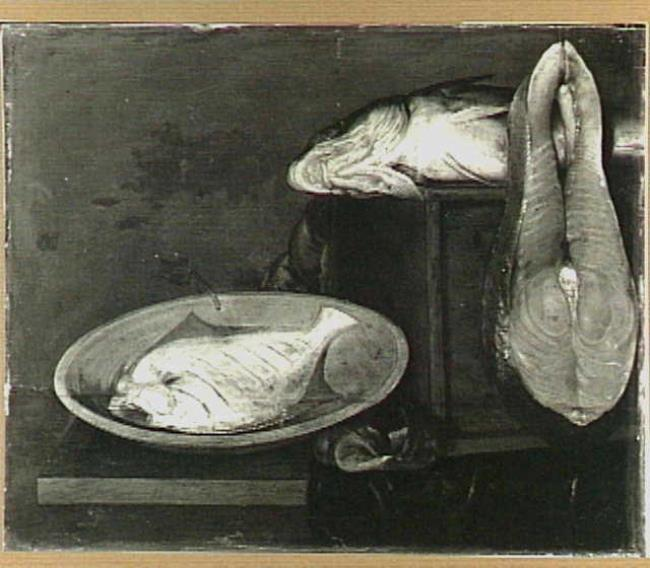
Still Life with a Stew, a Fish steak and a Flatfish on a Plate, 1657

== Sources ==
- Willigen, Adriaan van der; Meijer, Fred G., A dictionary of Dutch and Flemish still-life painters working in oils: 1525-1725, Leiden: Primavera Press, 2003, ISBN 90-74310-85-0
- Groenendijk, Pieter, Beknopt biografisch lexicon van Zuid- en Noord-Nederlandse schilders, graveurs, glasschilders, tapijtwevers et cetera van ca. 1350 tot ca. 1720, Leiden: Primavera (2008)
- Meijer, Fred G., Visstillevens in Holland en Vlaanderen, in: Helmus, Liesbeth M. (ed.) Vis: stillevens van Hollandse en Vlaamse meesters 1550-1700, Utrecht: Centraal Museum (2004), pp. 13–73
