= Jan Vincentsz van der Vinne =

Dutch painter

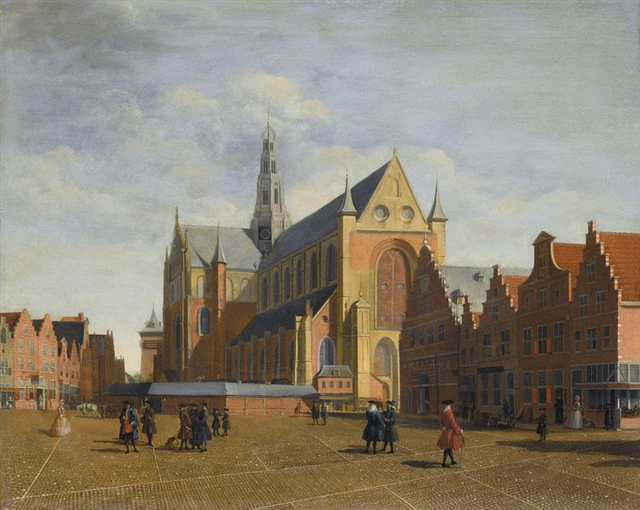
Haarlem, the Groote Markt looking towards the Church of Saint Bavo

Jan Vincentsz van der Vinne or Jan de Nageoires (1663 – 1721) was an 18th-century painter from the Dutch Republic.

== Biography ==
He was born in 1663, in Haarlem. According to Houbraken he was one of the three sons of Vincent van der Vinne, "the one working more, and the other working less", in the arts.

According to the RKD, except for a short stay in England in the years 1686-1688, he worked in Haarlem, like his brothers, the painters Laurens and Isaac. He is known for Italianate landscapes and scenes with horsemen. The painter Jan Mensing was his pupil.

He died in 1721, in Haarlem.
