= Guillam Dubois =

Dutch Golden Age landscape painter

- Born: 1623; Haarlem
- Died: 1661 (aged 37–38); Haarlem

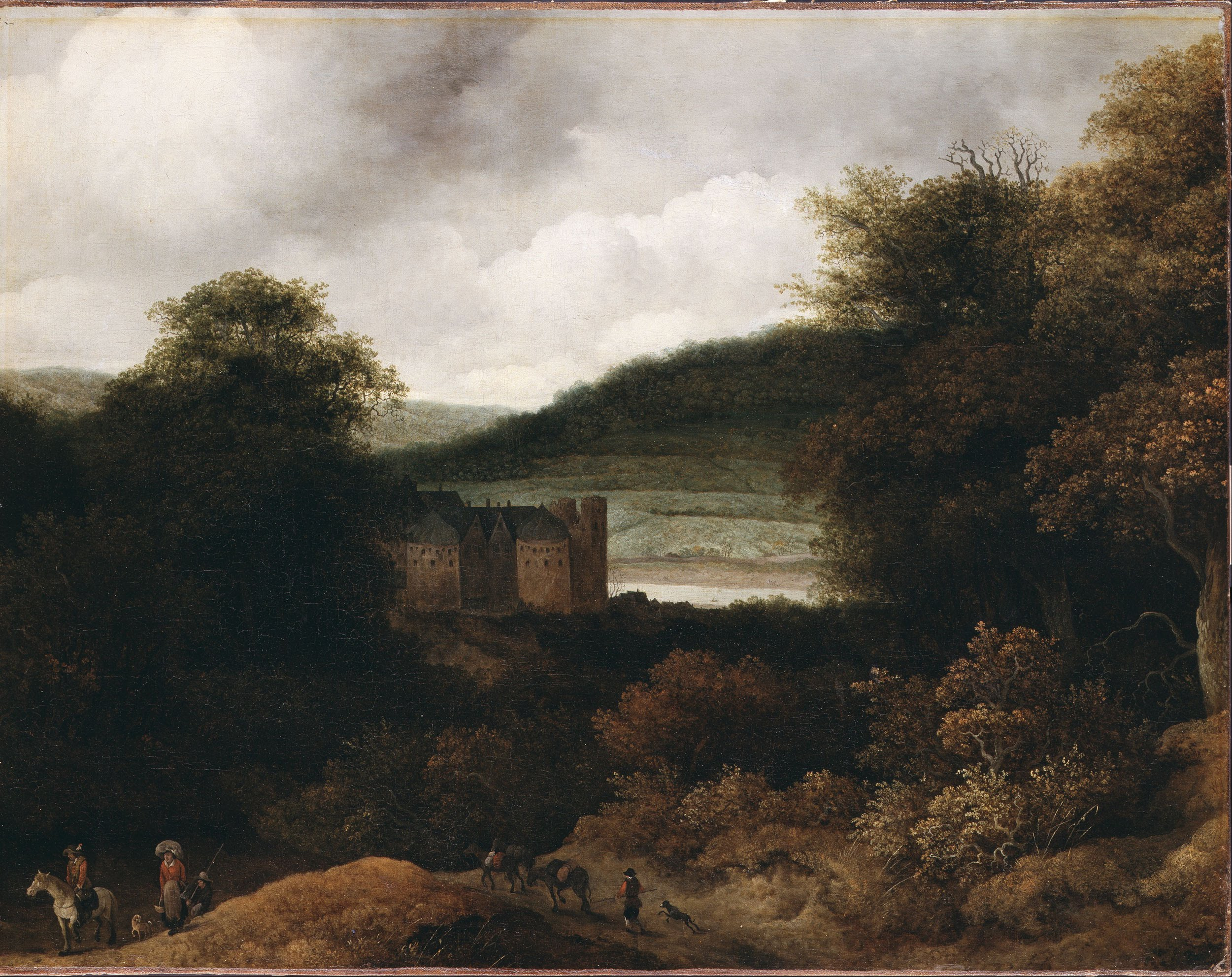
View of the Rhine, Dulwich Picture Gallery

Guillam Dubois (1623–1661), was a Dutch Golden Age landscape painter.

== Biography ==
According to the RKD, he was born in Haarlem and became a member of the Haarlem Guild of St. Luke in 1646. During the years 1652-1653 he made a trip through Germany with fellow guild members Vincent van der Vinne, Dirck Helmbreeker, Joost Boelen and Cornelis Bega. In 1652 they stayed a month with Abraham Cuyper in Cologne, and afterwards Helmbreeker returned to Haarlem, while Dubois and the others travelled to Frankfurt, Heidelberg, Darmstadt, and Mannheim before returning to spend the winter with Cuyper. Dubois returned to Haarlem in the Spring of 1653 and the trip influenced his later landscapes, though he was also a follower of Cornelis Vroom.

The months that Dubois spent in the company of Van der Vinne were recorded in Van der Vinne's diary. He died in Haarlem in 1661.
