= Vincent Laurensz van der Vinne II =

Dutch painter

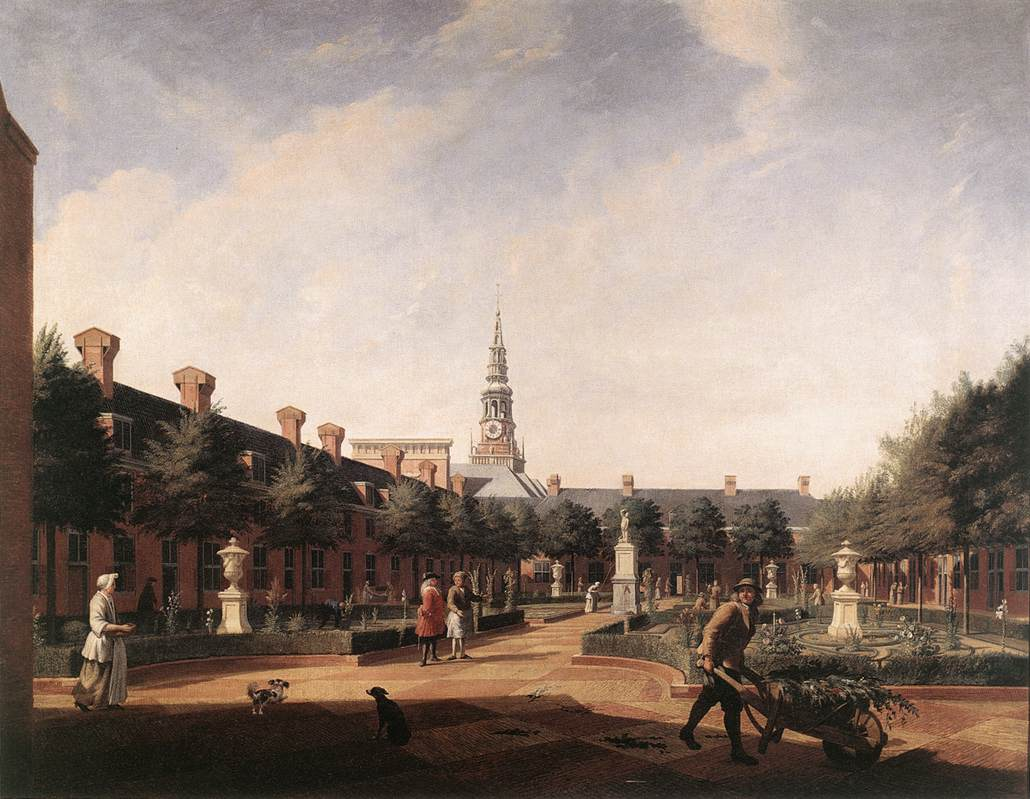
The courtyard of the Proveniershuis in 1735

Vincent Laurensz van der Vinne (1686, Haarlem – 1742, Haarlem) was an 18th-century painter from the Dutch Republic.

== Biography ==
According to the RKD he was the son of Laurens van der Vinne and the grandson of his namesake, known for landscapes, especially of his native Haarlem. Many of his paintings are in the collection of the Frans Hals Museum.
