= Laurens van der Vinne =

Dutch painter (1658–1729)

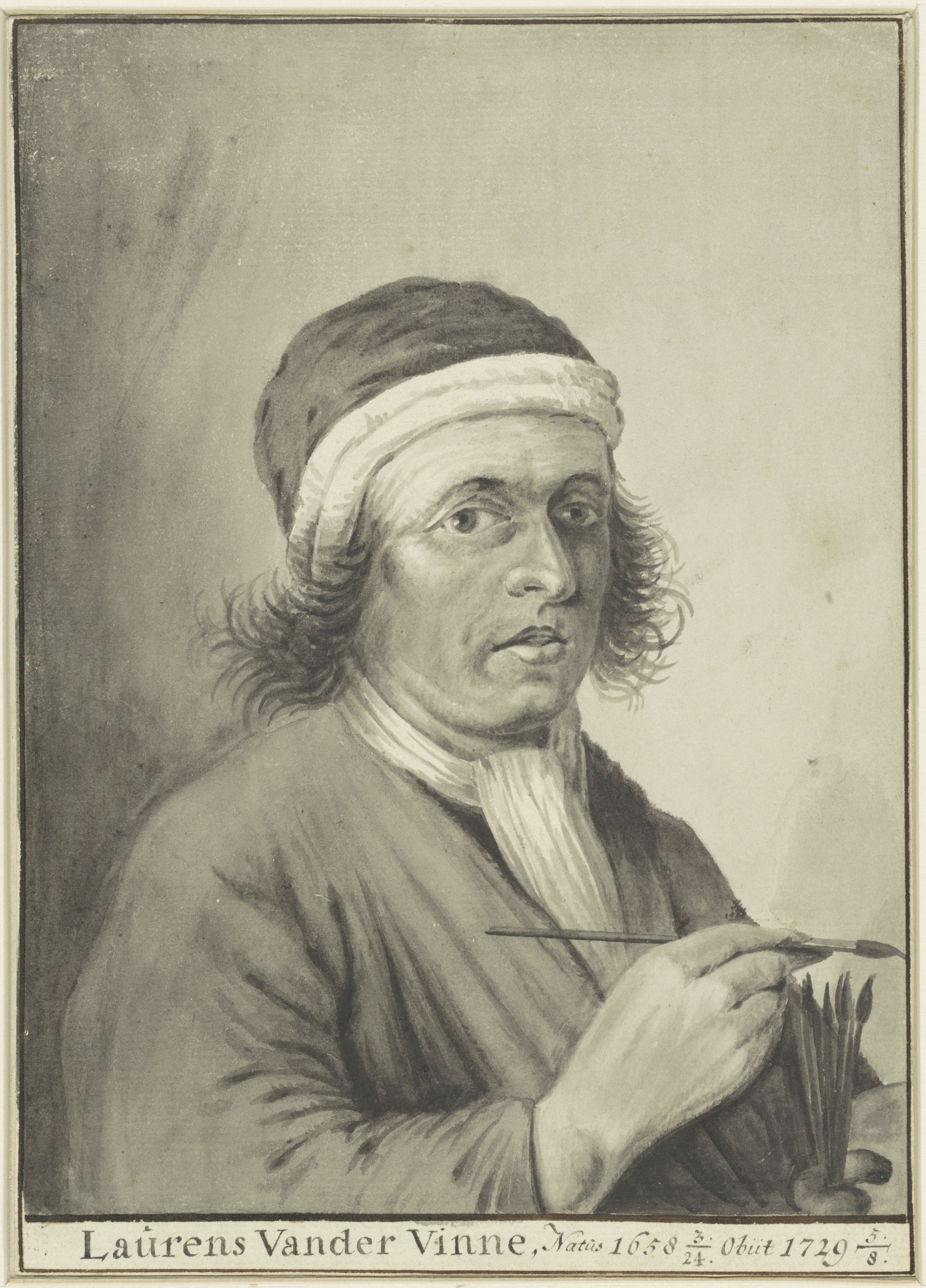
Portrait of Laurens van der Vinne

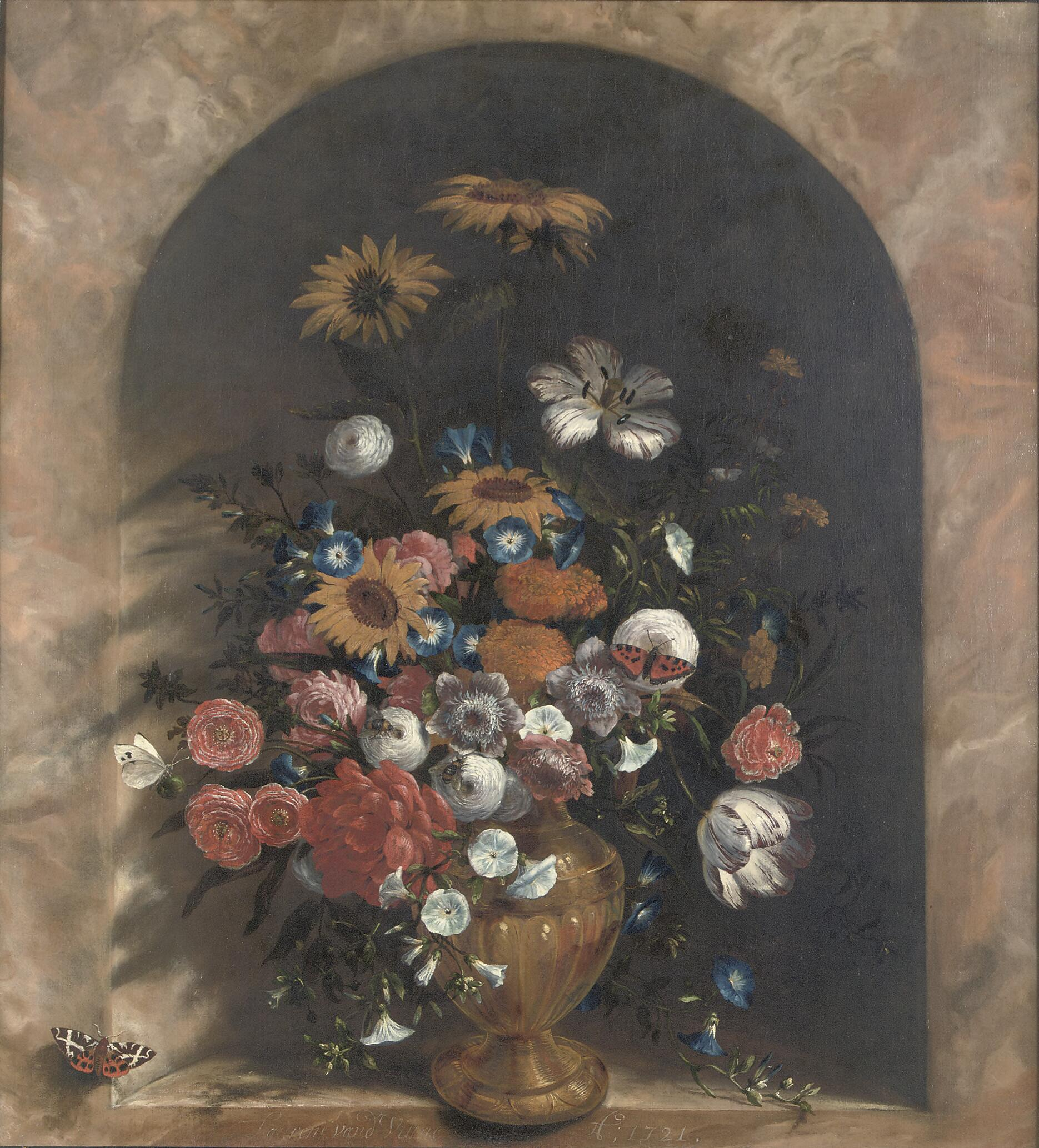
Sunflowers, roses, tulips and other flowers in a gilded vase in a trompe-l'oeil marble niche

Laurens Vincentsz van der Vinne (1658–1729) was an 18th-century painter from the Dutch Republic.

== Biography ==
Van der Vinne was born and died in Haarlem. According to Houbraken, he was the oldest and artistically most gifted son of the painter Vincent van der Vinne. Laurens helped his father draw up the list of 173 members of the Haarlem Guild of St. Luke that Vincent van der Vinne produced in 1702. He learned to paint from his father, and his paintings were similar, but he was especially good at painting flower still lifes, many of which he painted for Philips de Flines, who kept a garden with rare plants from the East and West Indies.

According to the RKD he learned to paint from his father, and from the glass painter Pieter Berchem. He became a member of the Haarlem Guild of St. Luke in 1685, and was dean in 1722 and 1728. He is known for landscapes and flower still lifes. His brothers Jan and Isaac, and his three sons Jacob, Jan Laurensz, and Vincent II also were painters.

He had a thread and ribbon factory on the Kleine Houtstraat 77 called the "Vossekop" (fox's head).
