= Vincent van der Vinne =

Dutch painter (1628–1702)

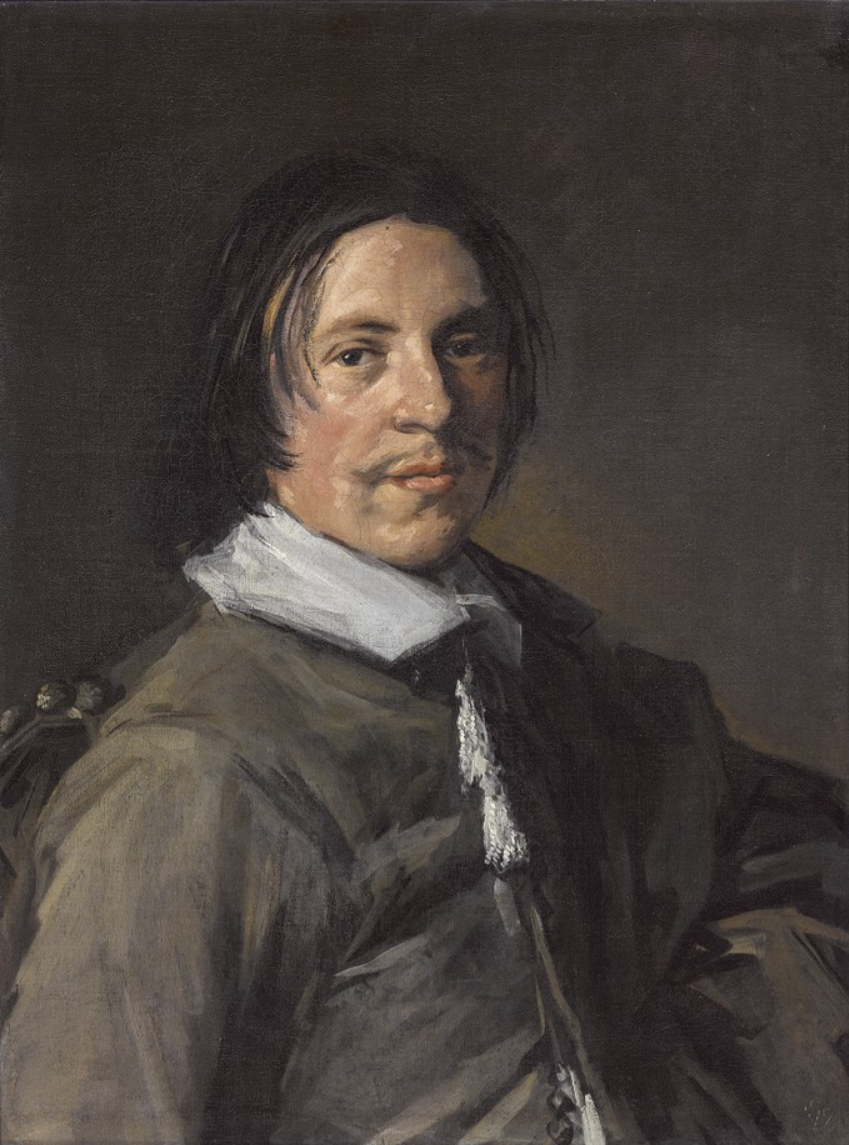
- Portrait by Frans Hals ca 1655
- Born: Vincent Laurensz van der Vinne; 11 October 1628; Haarlem
- Died: 26 July 1702 (aged 73)
- Known for: Painting, weaving
- Movement: Baroque

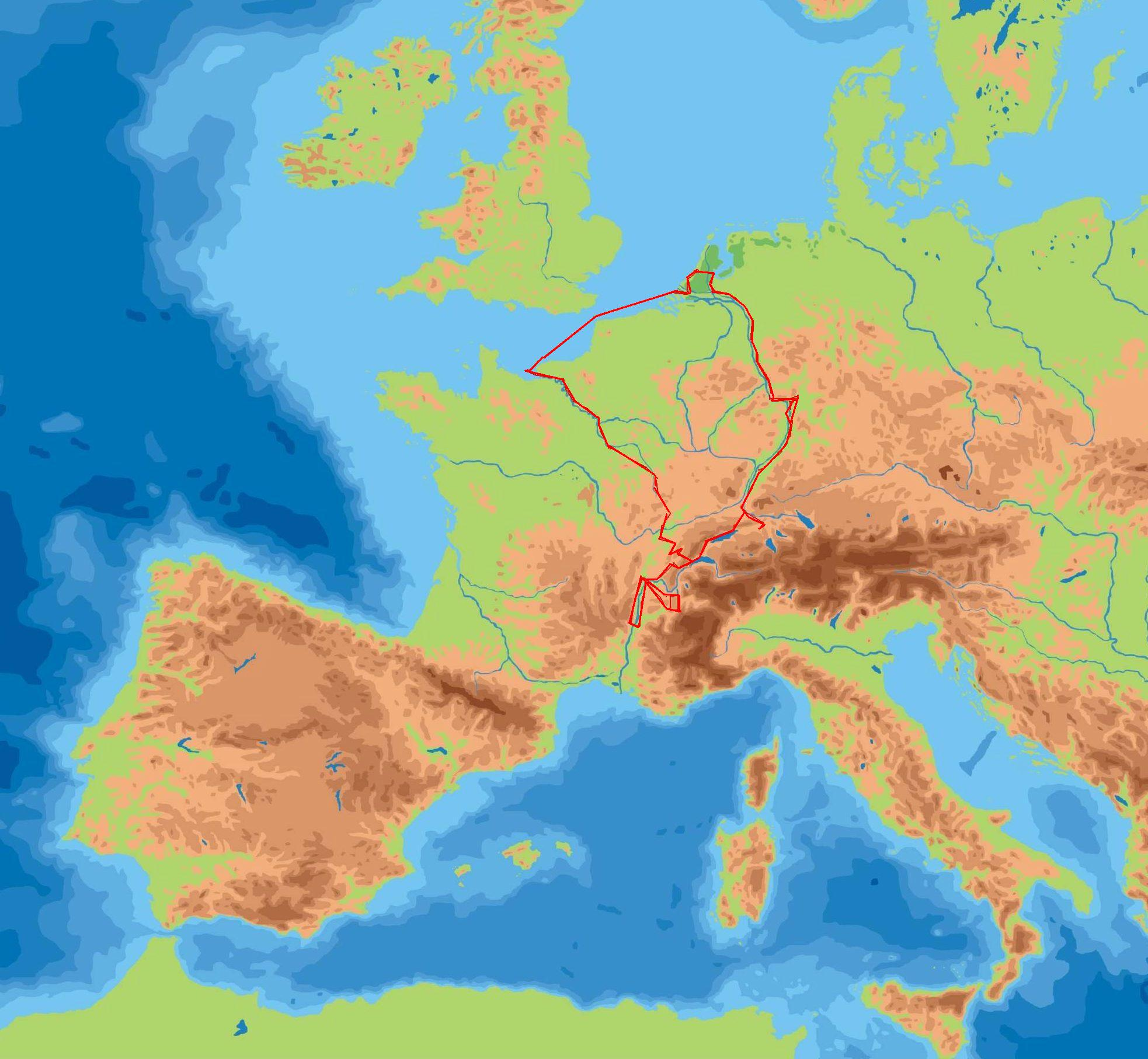
Vincent van der Vinne's Grand Tour through Europe shown in red.

Vincent Laurensz van der Vinne (1628–1702) was a Dutch Mennonite painter, linen-weaver, and writer.

== Biography ==
Van der Vinne was born, lived and worked in Haarlem and was a student of Frans Hals for nine months in 1647. In 1649 he became a member of the Haarlem Guild of St. Luke. In 1652 he left on a Grand Tour through Germany, Switzerland and France. For part of the trip he was accompanied by fellow painters Dirck Helmbreker, Cornelis Bega, Joost Boelen, and Guillam Dubois. This trip was recorded in Vincent van der Vinne's diaries and form an important archival record for the city of Haarlem.

== Grand tour ==
The purpose of a grand tour in those days was Italy, but van der Vinne never made it there. Since Karel van Mander published his Schilder-boeck in Haarlem in 1604, most young Haarlem painters wanted to see the Italian paintings in real life, and it became a common rite of passage, but not without dangers. Van der Vinne endured many hardships on his journey, including being kidnapped for a short period. He even stopped making sketches of the countryside at one point, because he feared to be mistaken for a military surveyor. Judging from a map of his travels, he seemed daunted by the Alps, skirting them for weeks but never making the crossing, despite what appears to be 3 attempts to cross over to Turin. He nevertheless makes no mention of this in his diaries, and seems to feel that his sole purpose all along was to explore Germany and Switzerland. He became embroiled in the Swiss peasant war of 1653. On 10 May, Van der Vinne and his companions Boelen and Bega left Basel for Bern and were taken prisoner by a group of farmers. The leader of these farmers, Niklaus Leuenberger, let him and his companions go the next day. They returned to Basel and set off for Geneva, sticking as much as possible to trails on the Burgundian side of the troubles, through Vaud. This experience clearly cut off any plans of crossing the alps in the ways normally suggested by Van Mander's book, and Van der Vinne thus records an unusual journey that goes much farther west than his contemporaries from the Haarlem Guild of St. Luke were accustomed to travelling. Cornelis Bega, who spoke no French at all, returned home, but Van der Vinne and Boelen stayed in Geneva for 15 months. The next spring they traveled further south to Lyon and spent some months in Tournon. On the way back to Geneva, Boelen was molested by soldiers, having departed a few weeks before Van der Vinne. The borders were still very unsafe for travelers. Van der Vinne returned to Geneva on 12 April.

=== Massacre of the Waldensians ===
On 4 April 1655, Thomas Francis, Prince of Carignano commanded the Waldensians to attend Mass or remove to the upper valleys, giving them twenty days in which to sell their lands. In the name of his father, the Duke of Savoy he sent an army and on 24 April, at 4 a.m., the signal was given for a general massacre so brutal, that it aroused indignation throughout Europe. Oliver Cromwell began petitioning on behalf of the Vaudois, and John Milton wrote his famous poem about this, "On the Late Massacre in Piedmont." Just as Milton did, Van der Vinne expressed his own disgust and horror in a long poem, and the next month he decided to go home.

== Works ==
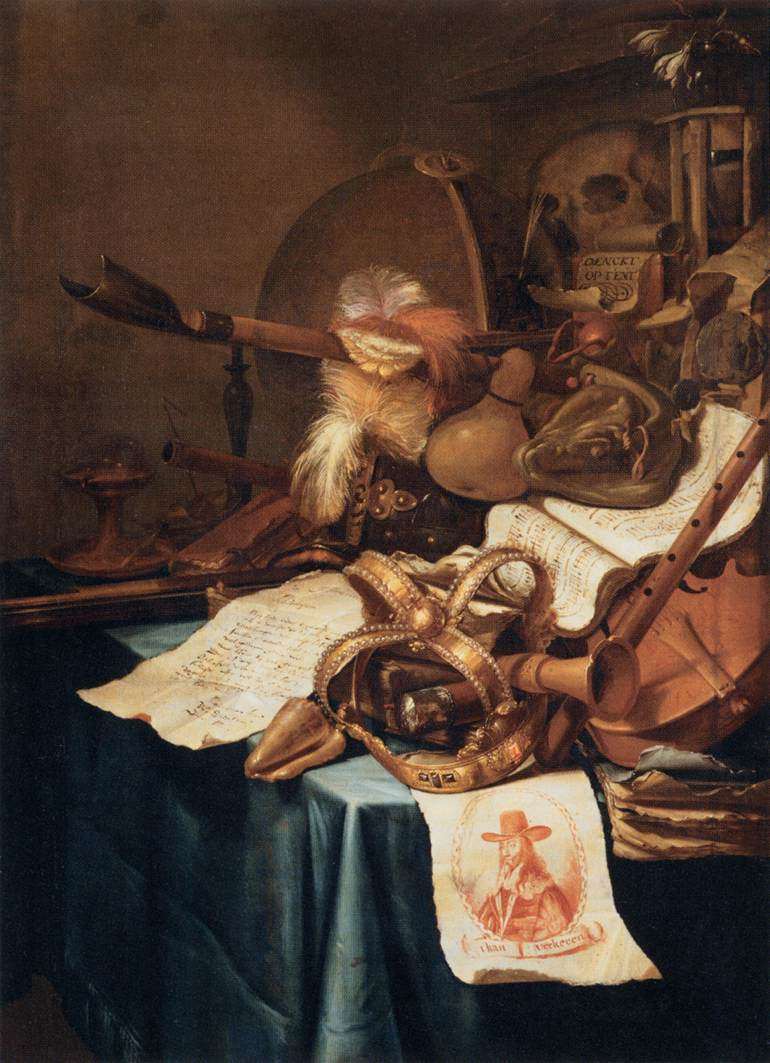
Vanitas with a Royal Crown

Though he started as a weaver working in Haarlem's famous white linen damask industry, van der Vinne quickly took to painting, and would take on any painting job no matter how small. According to Houbraken, this led to an oft-quoted comment by Job Adriaenszoon Berckheyde, who claimed that he was "the Raffael of sign-boards". When he spoke of his own work, van der Vinne often repeated the advice of his teacher Frans Hals, saying that "one must boldly smear the paint on; when you become confident in the art, then neatness will follow". What survives today from his hand are mostly still lifes and genre scenes, often with a similar arrangement of a vanitas items, and many include a trompe l'oeil portrait sketch on a paper hanging off a desk. In one of these, he has copied a crumpled drawing of himself by Leendert van der Cooghen. His style was copied by Evert Collier, Pieter van Eisen, and Barent van Eisen. Helmer J. Helmers devotes some pages to discussion of Van de Vinne's vanitas still-life paintings incorporating images of the executed Charles I of England

== Family of painters ==
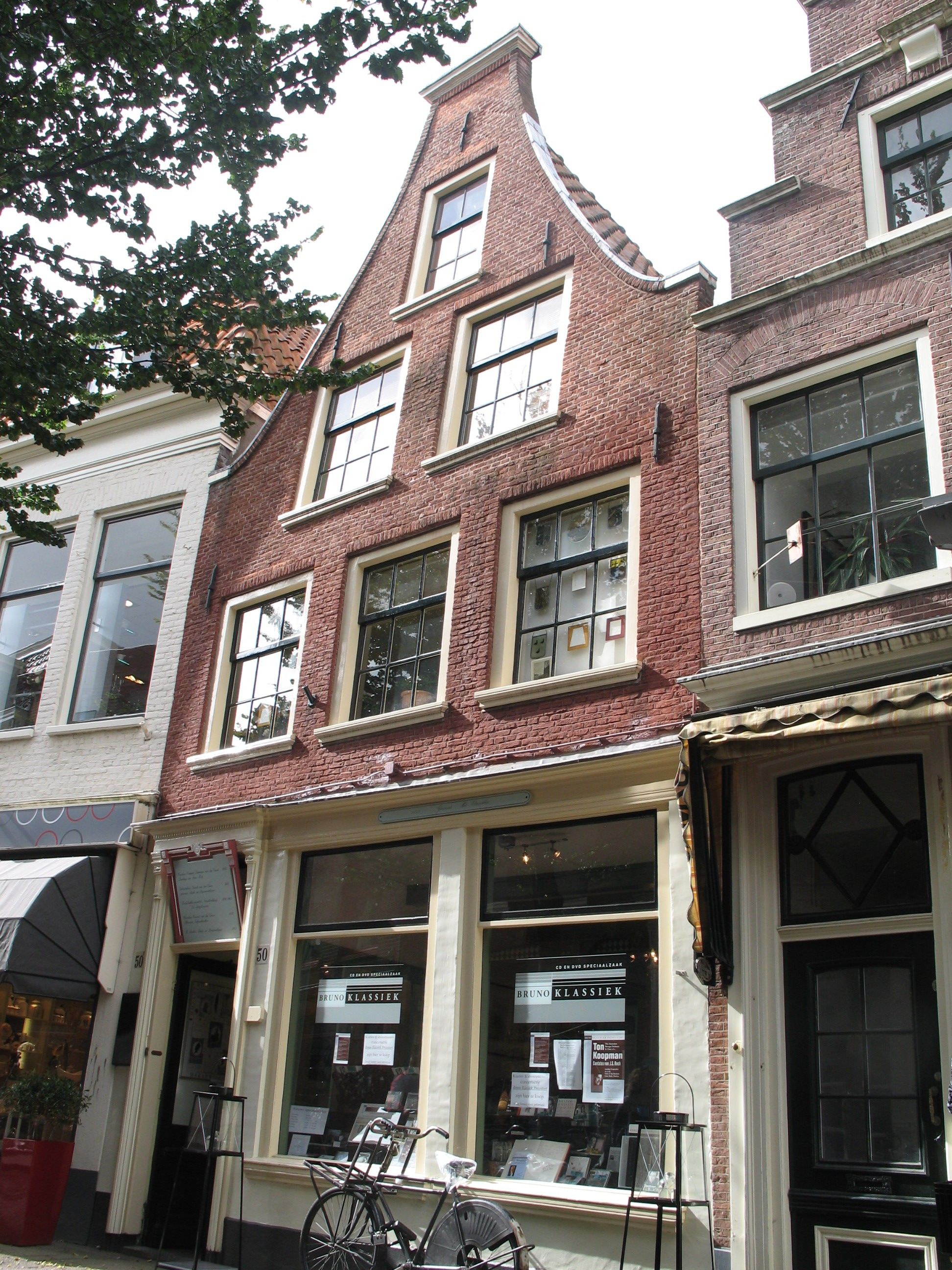
Gierstraat 50, Haarlem. A commemorative plaque reads that Vincent van der Vinne lived in this house with his first wife in 1663 and this is where their son Isaac was born in 1665. Another Vincent van der Vinne, a flower bulb merchant, lived here in 1839.

He finally returned to Haarlem in 1655 and married Anneke Jansdr de Gaver in 1656, a widow with two small children. It was at this time that his portrait was painted by Frans Hals, probably as half of a pair of wedding portraits. When she died in 1668, he was left with four young children; Laurens (1658–1729), Maeijke (1659–1689), Jan (1663–1721), and Isaac (1665–1740). His sons all became successful painters.

In 1668 he remarried, to Catalijntje Boeckaert, with whom he had four more children who died in infancy. In 1676 he became a member of the fire department (pompmeester). In 1677 he moved to a house in the Grote Houtstraat, where he lived until he died. In 1689 he became deacon of the Haarlem Mennonite community known as "de Blok". On 9 September 1693 he celebrated his 25th wedding anniversary, which was highly unusual.

== Important archive source for Haarlem guild ==
By the time he became a widower, Van der Vinne was an established painter in Haarlem and had served on the board of the St Luke's guild in 1661 and 1662. In their archives is a list in his hand of 173 painters he considered competent. This list was edited by his son Laurens in 1702 with 157 'd's to indicate which of these artists had died before his father, and added to his Geslagt-Register, which was a description of active painters from the Haarlem guild. This list was used as a source for Arnold Houbraken, who added these painters to his list. Much later Vincent's grandson Vincent Jansz. van der Vinne (1736–1811), himself a painter, used this list again to compare the names with the dates of painters who had joined the Guild of St. Luke in Haarlem.

=== Source for Arnold Houbraken ===
Van der Vinne's diaries, which he embellished on his return, were never published in his lifetime, but were used by Houbraken for his great work on Dutch painters, the Schouburg. The Vincent van der Vinne diaries, accompanied by modern commentary were published in Dutch in 1979. When Van der Vinne died he left a will of 20 pages, and among several properties, he owned paintings by Karel van Mander, Hans Gillisz. Bollongier, Pieter Claesz, Guillam Dubois, and by himself and his sons.
