= Ertz =

Ertz is a surname. Notable people with this surname include:

- Bruno Ertz (1873–1956), American painter
- Edward Frederick Ertz (1862-1954), Anglo-American artist
- Julie Ertz (born 1992), American soccer player; wife of Zach Ertz
- Klaus Ertz (born 1945), German art historian
- Susan Ertz (1887–1985), Anglo-American writer
- Zach Ertz (born 1990), American football player; husband of Julie Ertz
