= Klaus Ertz =

German art historian

- Born: 11 June 1945; Homburg, Saarland, Germany
- Died: 3 August 2023 (aged 78); Lingen, Germany

Klaus Ertz (11 June 1945 – 3 August 2023) was a German art historian specializing in the Brueghel family of artists and their workshop.

Ertz was born in Homburg and is best known for his catalogues raisonnés on Jan Brueghel the Elder, his son Jan II, his brother Pieter Brueghel the Younger, Josse de Momper, Marten van Cleve, Jan van Kessel, David Vinckboons, Josef van Bredal and Adriaen van Stalbemt. Ertz works as a private art consultant for various institutions in the art market. He and his wife Christa Nitze-Ertz own the art printing house Luca-Verlag in Lingen(Ems) that publishes books about Flemish paintings of the 16th and 17th century.

== Works ==
- Pieter Breughel der Jüngere - Jan Brueghel der Ältere : flämische Malerei um 1600, Tradition und Fortschritt, by Ertz, Klaus, 1997
- Jan Breughel der Jüngere (1601-1678) : die Gemälde mit kritischem Œuvrekatalog, by Ertz, Klaus, 1985
- Jan Brueghel der Ältere (1568-1625) : d. Gemälde : mit krit. Oeuvrekatalog, by Ertz, Klaus, 1979
- Fälschung und Forschung : Ausstellung Museum Folkwang Essen, Oktober 1976-Januar 1977 : Skulpturengalerie, Staatl. Museen Preuss. Kulturbesitz Berlin, Januar-März 1977, by Ertz, Klaus, 1977
- Jan Brueghel the elder : a loan exhibition of paintings, 21 June-20 July 1979., by Brod Gallery (London, England), 1979
- Josse de Momper der Jüngere, 1564-1635 : die Gemälde mit kritischem Oeuvre-katalog = Josse de Momper the Younger : the paintings with critical catalogue raisonné; with English language summary, by Ertz, Klaus, 1986
- Jan Brueghel der Ältere (1568-1625) : kritischer Katalog der Gemälde, by Ertz, Klaus, 2008
- Pieter Brueghel der Jüngere (1564-1637/38) : die Gemälde mit kritischem Œuvrekatalog, by Ertz, Klaus, 1988
- Jan Brueghel der Ältere (1568-1625), by Ertz, Klaus, 1981
- Marten van Cleve 1524-1581 : Kritischer Katalog der Gemälde und Zeichnungen, by Ertz, Klaus, 2014
- Josef van Bredael 1688-1739 : die Gemälde; mit kritischem Œuvrekatalog, by Ertz, Klaus, 2006
- Jan van Kessel der Ältere 1626-1679; Jan van Kessel der Jüngere 1654-1708; Jan van Kessel der 'Andere' ca. 1620 - ca. 1661 : kritische Kataloge der Gemälde, by Ertz, Klaus, 2012
- Die Brueghel Familie = The Brueghel family, by Ertz, Klaus, 2015
- Paysages et saisons : aspects de l'art néerlandais du 17ème siècle, by Ertz, Klaus, 1987
- The Brueghel family of painters and further masters from the Golden Age of Netherlandish painting, by Ertz, Klaus, 1986
- Landscapes and saisons : aspects of Netherlands art in the seventeenth century, by Ertz, Klaus, 1987
- Jan Brueghel II (1601-1678) : zwei unbekannte Gemälde in russischen Sammlungen, kunstwissenschaftlich ins Spätwerk eingeordnet, by Ertz, Klaus, 2014
- 17th century Netherlands painting : Galerie d'art St Honoré exhibition octobre 1985, by Ertz, Klaus, 1985
- David Vinckboons, 1576-1632 : Monographie mit kritischem Katalog der Zeichnungen und Gemälde, by Ertz, Klaus, 2016
- Blumen, Allegorien, Historie, Genre, Gemäldeskizzen : Kat. 420 - 584, by Ertz, Klaus, 2010
- Jan Brueghel d. Ä. als Mitarbeiter : Kat. 585 - 810; Addendum Kat. Add. 1 - 30, by Ertz, Klaus, 2010
- Niederländische Malerei des 17. Jahrhunderts, by Ertz, Klaus, 1985
