= Bruno Ertz =

American painter

Bruno Ertz (1873–1956) was an American painter. Born in Manitowoc, Wisconsin, he opened a studio in Milwaukee. His work is in the collections of the Charles Allis Art Museum, the Leigh Yawkey Woodson Art Museum, the Museum of Wisconsin Art, and the Rahr West Art Museum.
