= Jan Brueghel the Elder =

Flemish painter (1568–1625)

- Jan Brueghel de Oude
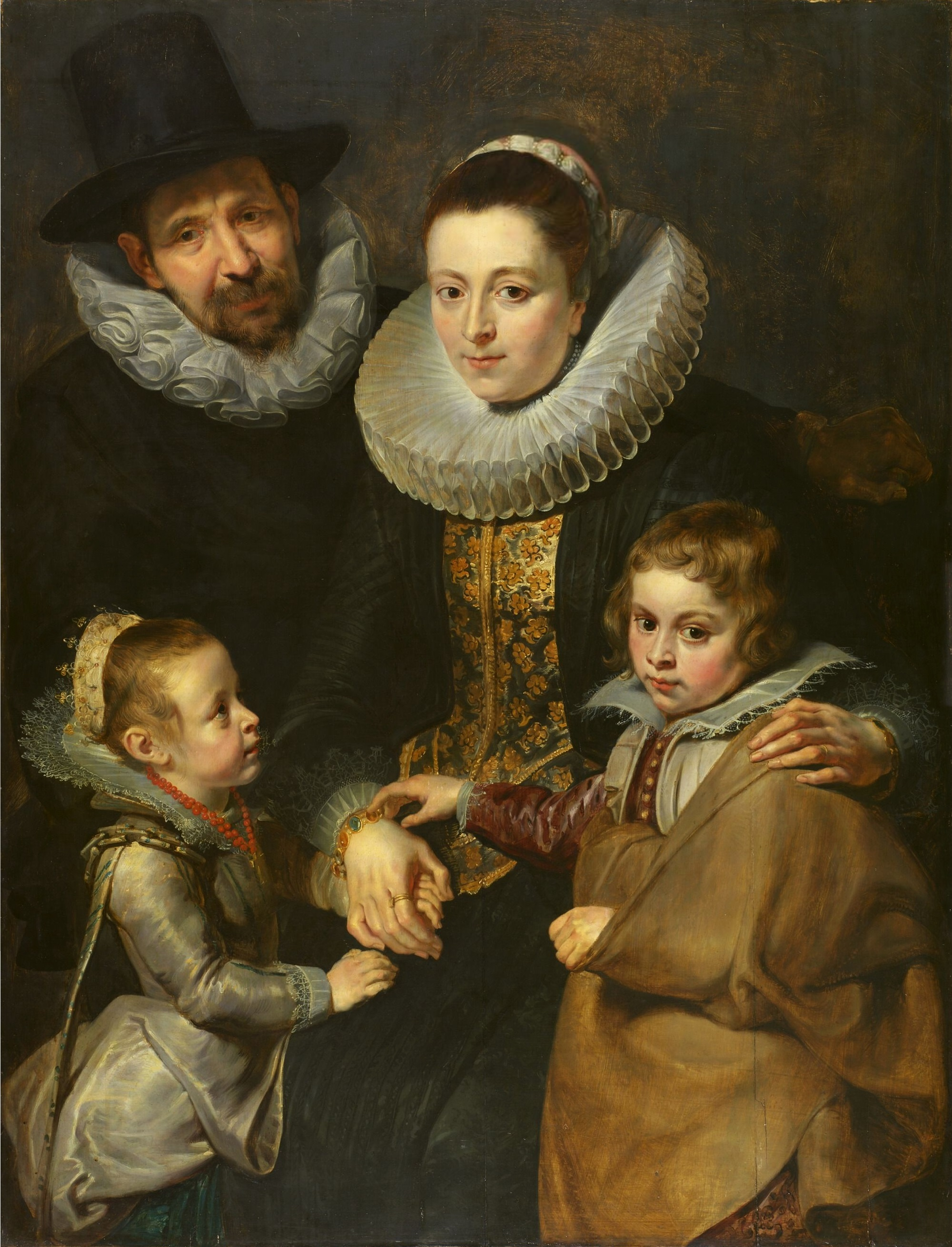
- Family of Jan Brueghel the Elder by Rubens, 1613-1615. Brueghel can be seen on the left.
- Born: Jan Brueghel; 1568; Brussels, Habsburg Netherlands
- Died: 13 January 1625 (aged 56–57); Antwerp, Habsburg Netherlands
- Occupations: Painter, draughtsman
- Movement: Flemish Baroque
- Children: 11, including Jan the Younger, Anna Brueghel and Ambrosius
- Father: Pieter Bruegel the Elder
- Family: Brueghel family

Jan Brueghel the Elder (Note: Also spelt as Bruegel or Breughel) (/ˈbrɔɪɡəl/ BROY-gəl, US also /ˈbruːɡəl/ BROO-gəl; Dutch: [ˈjɑm ˈbrøːɣəl]; 1568 – 13 January 1625) was a Flemish painter and draughtsman. He was the younger son of the eminent Flemish Renaissance painter Pieter Bruegel the Elder, and brother to Pieter Brueghel the Younger. A close friend and frequent collaborator with Peter Paul Rubens, the two artists were the leading Flemish painters in the Flemish Baroque painting of the first three decades of the 17th century.

Brueghel worked in many genres including history paintings, flower still lifes, allegorical and mythological scenes, landscapes and seascapes, hunting pieces, village scenes, battle scenes and scenes of hellfire and the underworld. He was an important innovator who invented new types of paintings such as flower garland paintings, paradise landscapes, and gallery paintings in the first quarter of the 17th century. However, he generally avoided painting large figures, as in portraits, though he often collaborated with other painters who did these, while he did the landscape backgrounds, and sometimes the clothes.

He further created genre paintings that were imitations, pastiches and reworkings of his father's works, in particular his father's genre scenes and landscapes with peasants. Brueghel represented the type of the pictor doctus, the erudite painter whose works are informed by the religious motifs and aspirations of the Catholic Counter-Reformation as well as the scientific revolution with its interest in accurate description and classification. He was court painter of the Archduke and Duchess Albert VII and Isabella, sovereigns of the Spanish Netherlands.

The artist was nicknamed "Velvet" Brueghel, "Flower" Brueghel, and "Paradise" Brueghel. The first is believed to have been given him because of his mastery in the rendering of fabrics. The second nickname is a reference to his fame as a painter of (although not a specialist in) flower pieces and the last one to his invention of the genre of the paradise landscape. His brother Pieter Brueghel the Younger was traditionally nicknamed de helse Brueghel, 'Hell Brueghel' because it was believed he was the creator of a number of paintings with fantastic depictions of fire and grotesque imagery. These paintings have now been reattributed to Jan Brueghel the Elder.

== Life ==
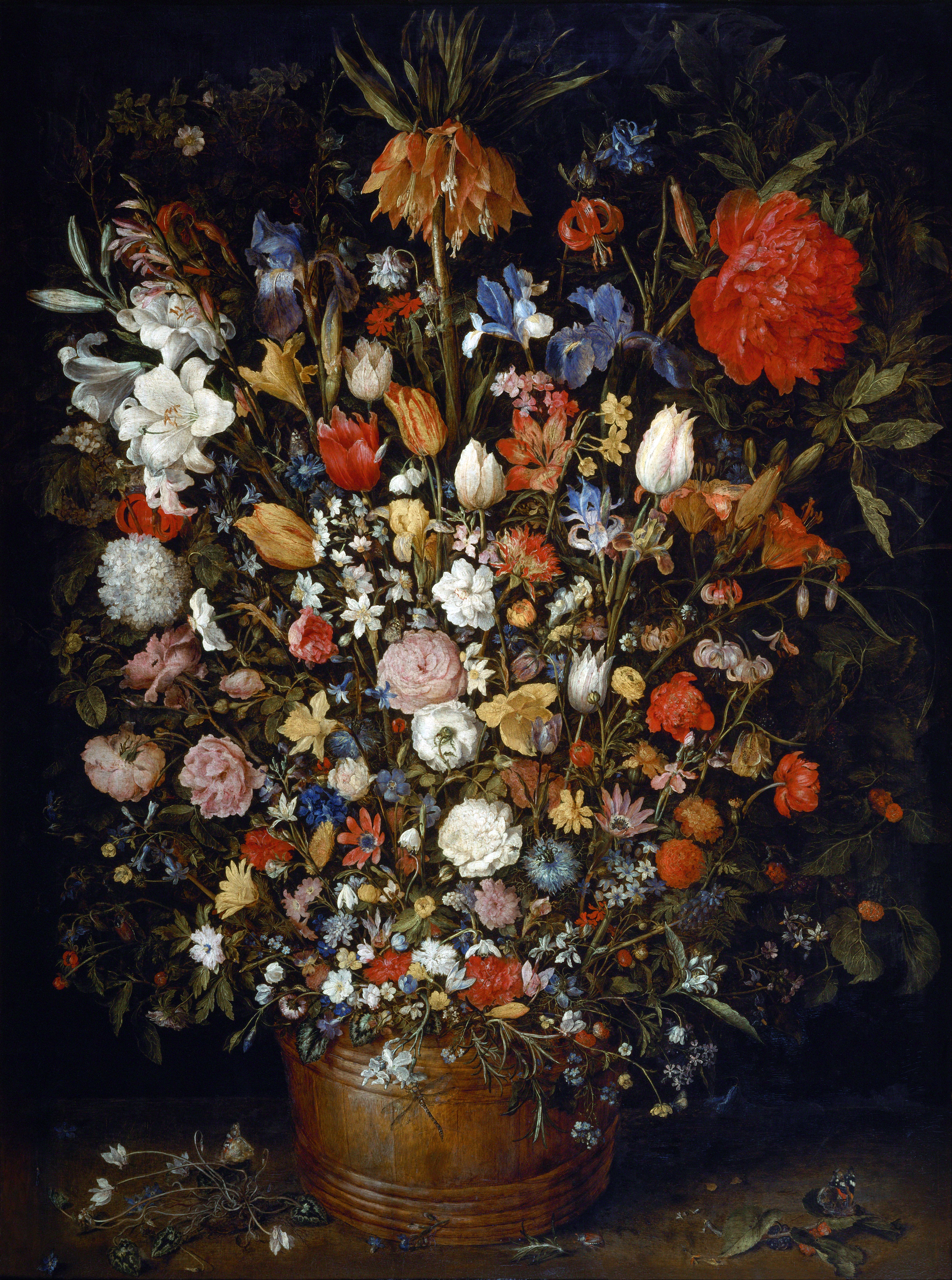
Flowers in a Wooden Vessel (1603)

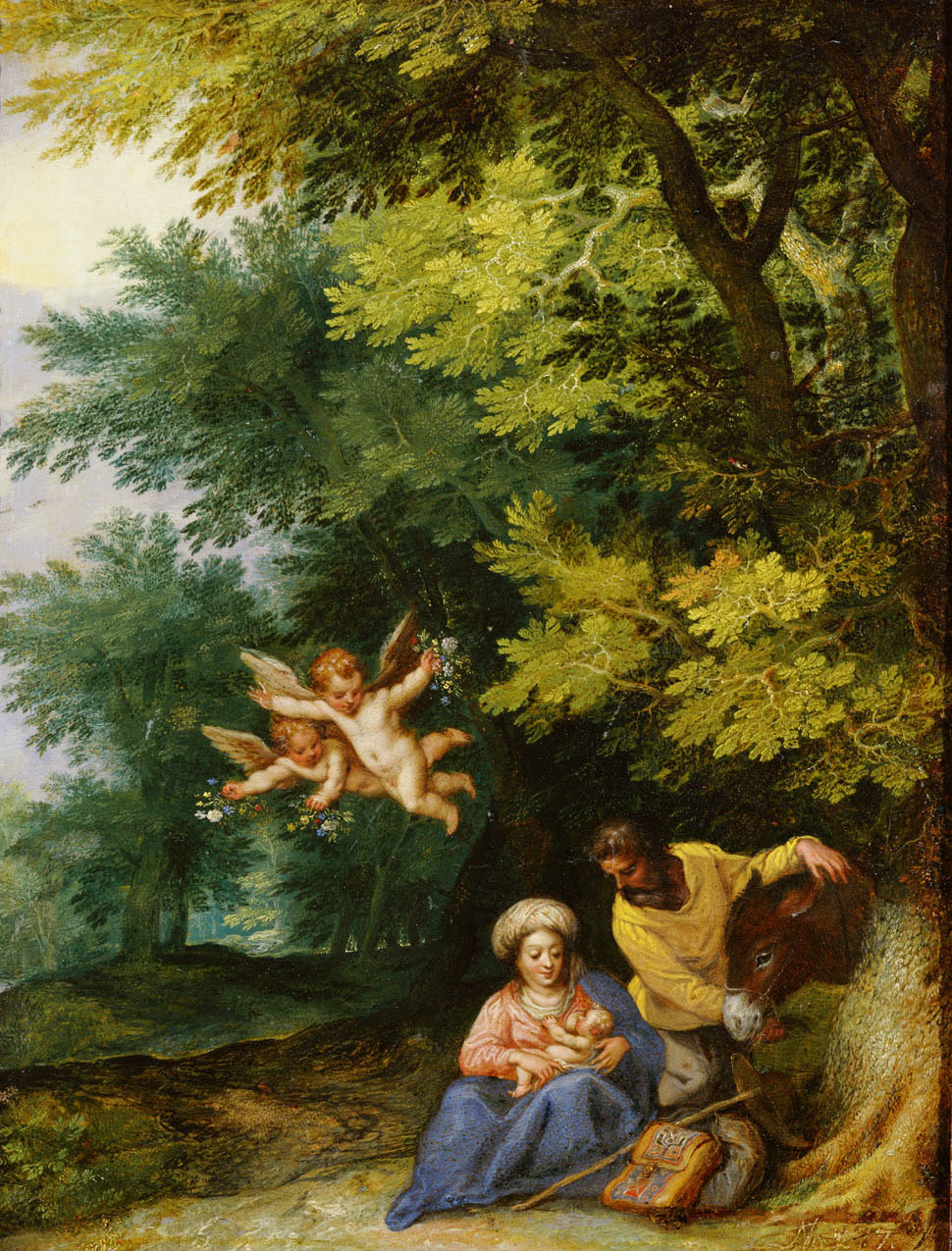
Rest on the Flight into Egypt, with Hans Rottenhammer

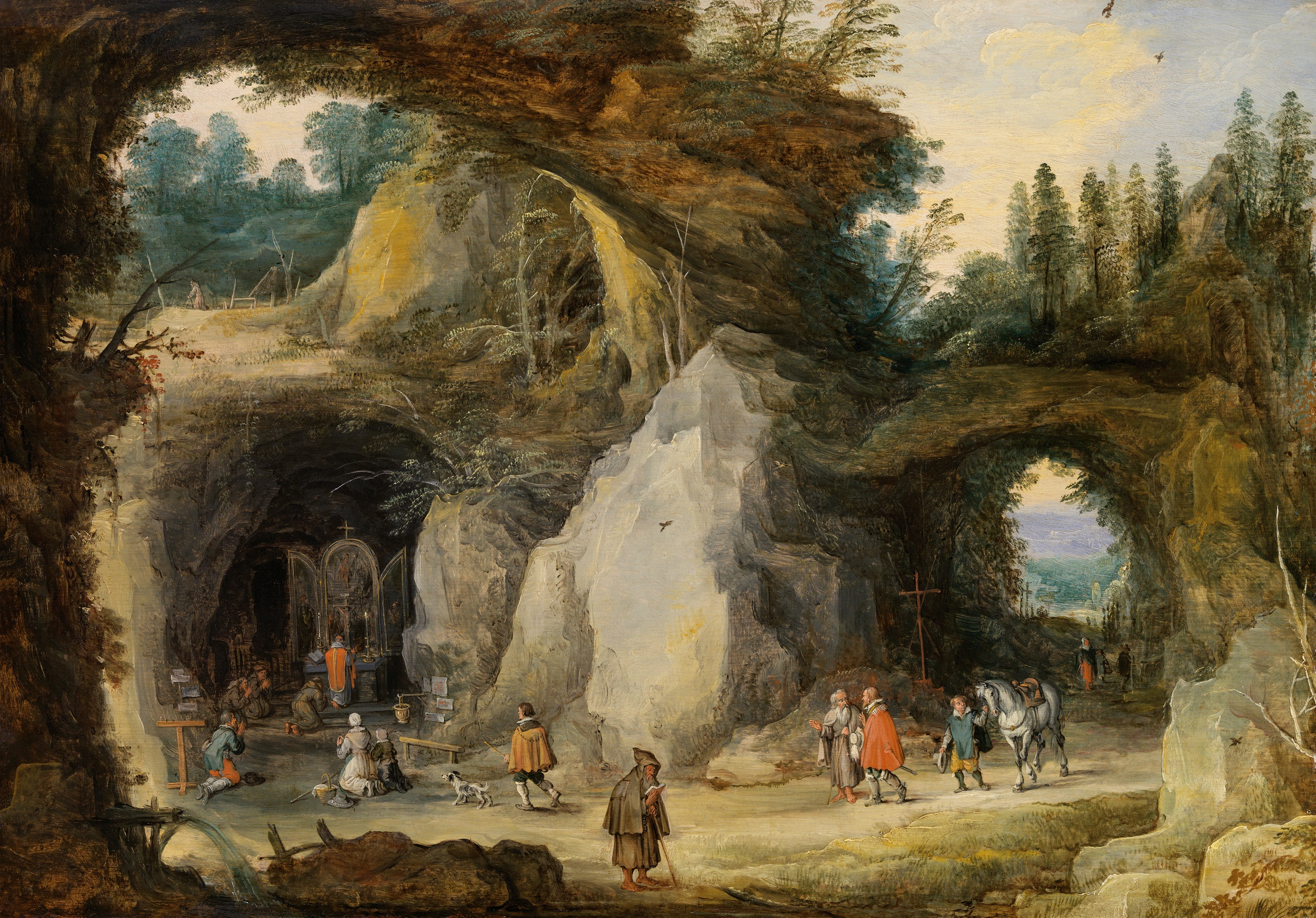
Mountain Landscape with Pilgrims in a Grotto Chapel, with Joos de Momper (II)

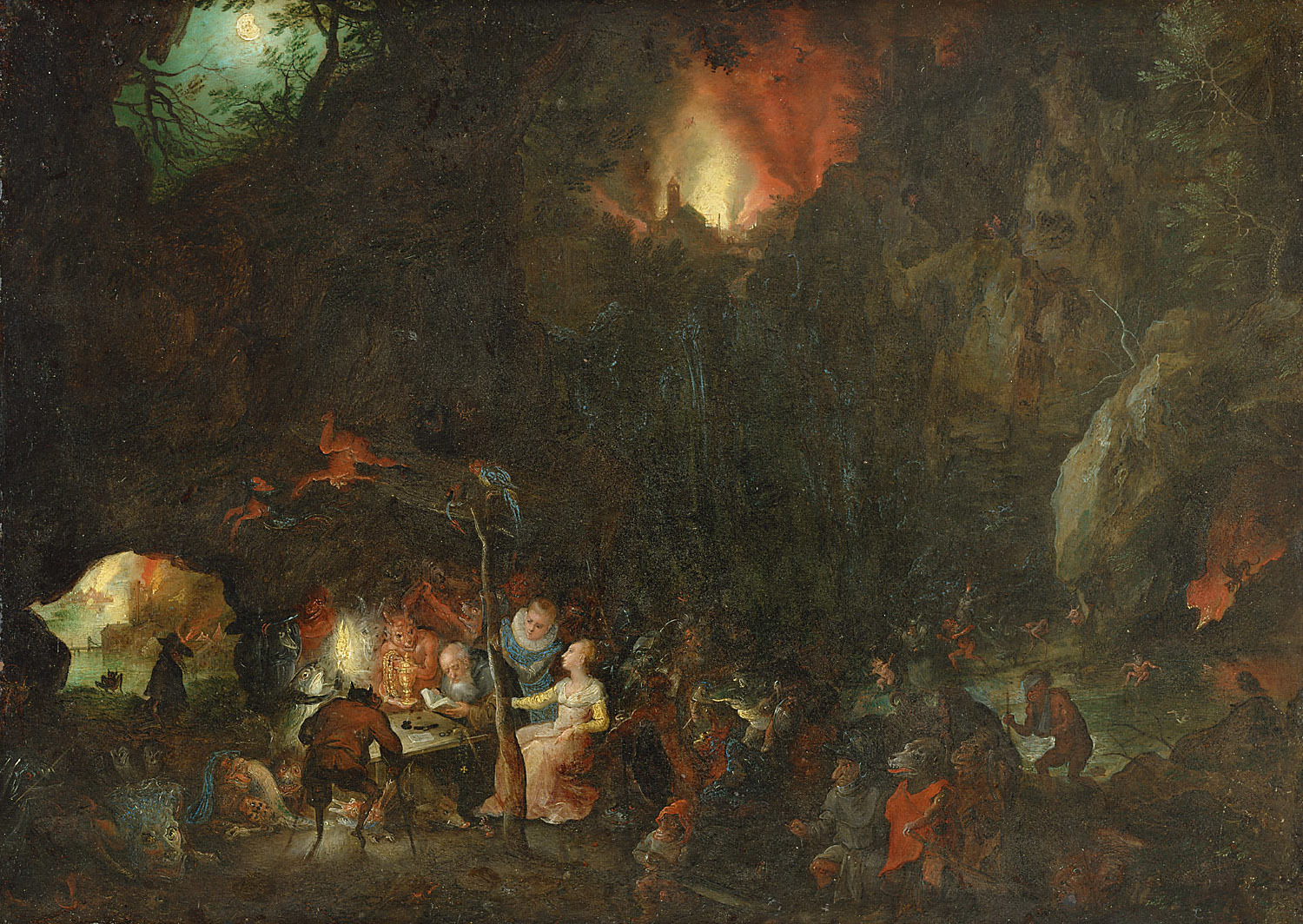
The Temptation of St Anthony

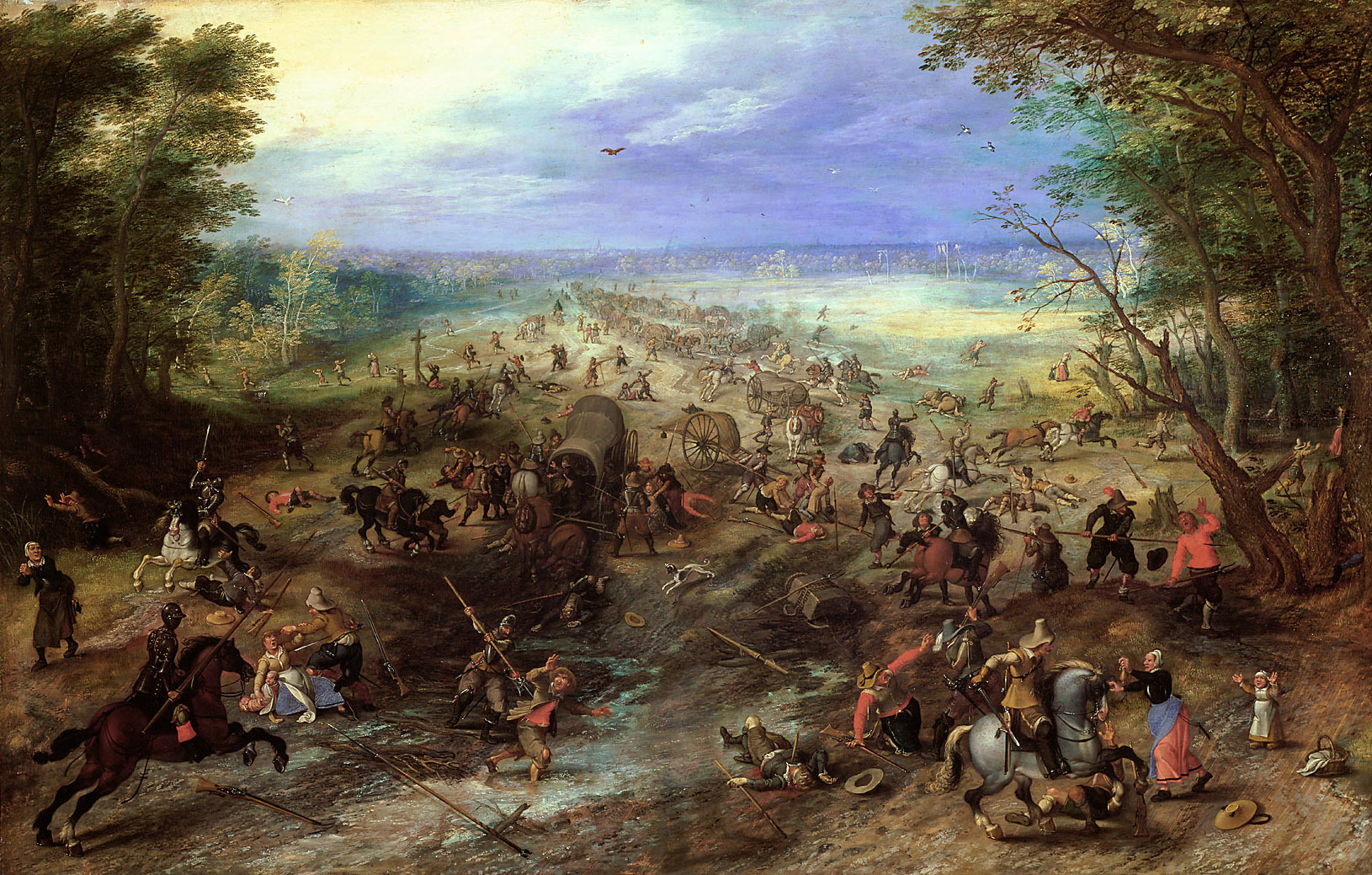
Assault on a convoy, with Sebastiaen Vrancx

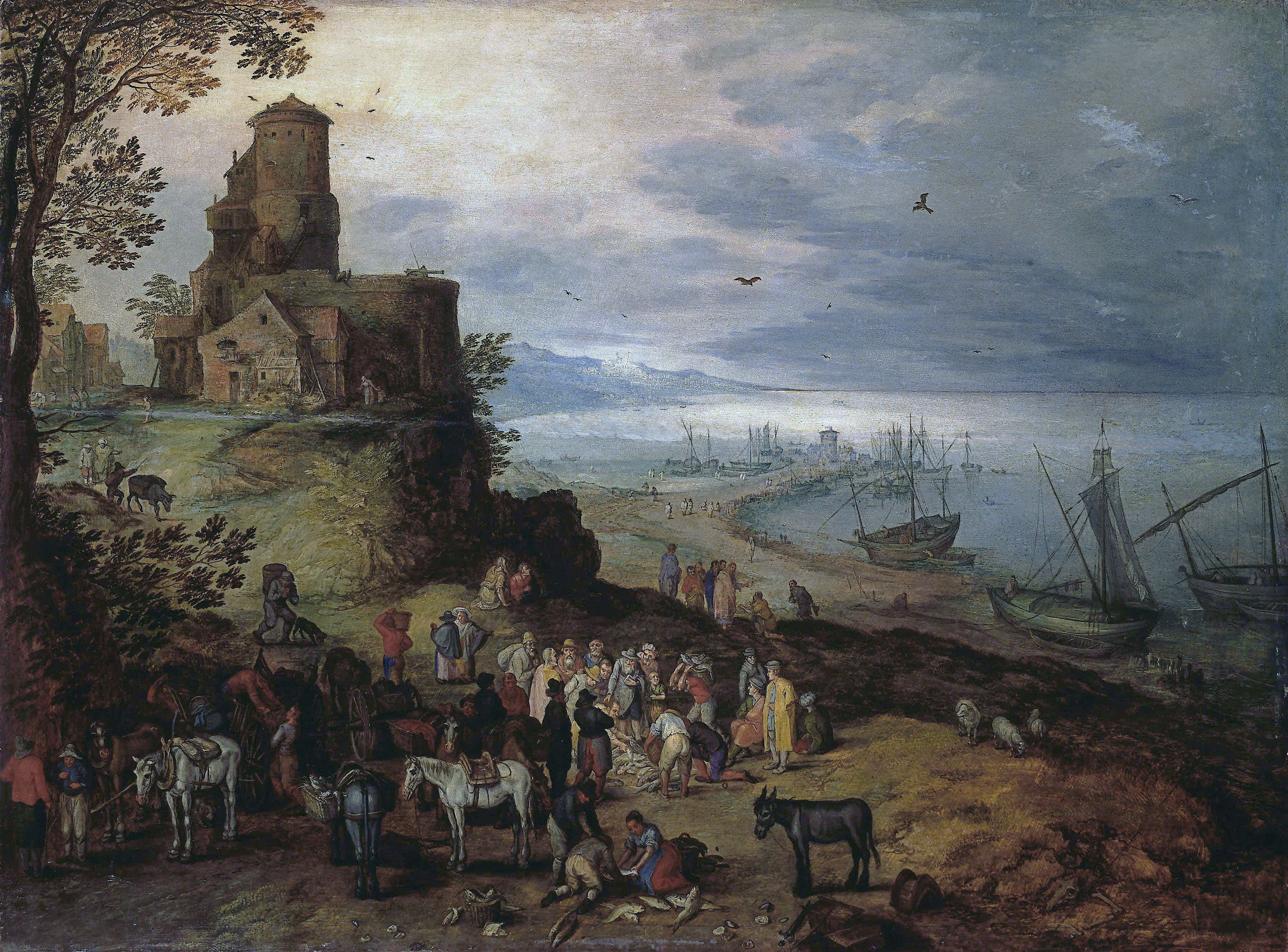
The Apostles Peter and Andrew

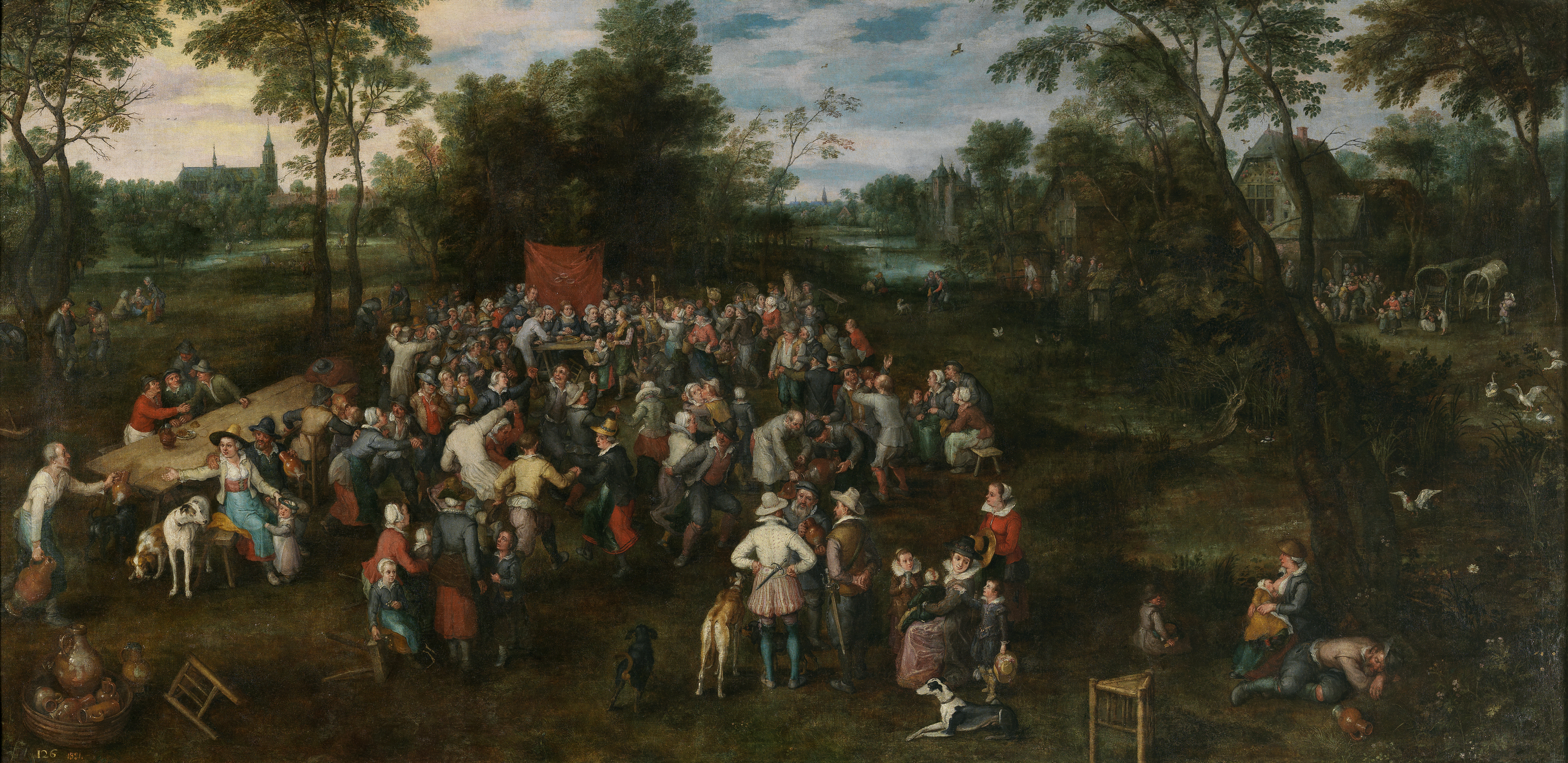
The Wedding Banquet

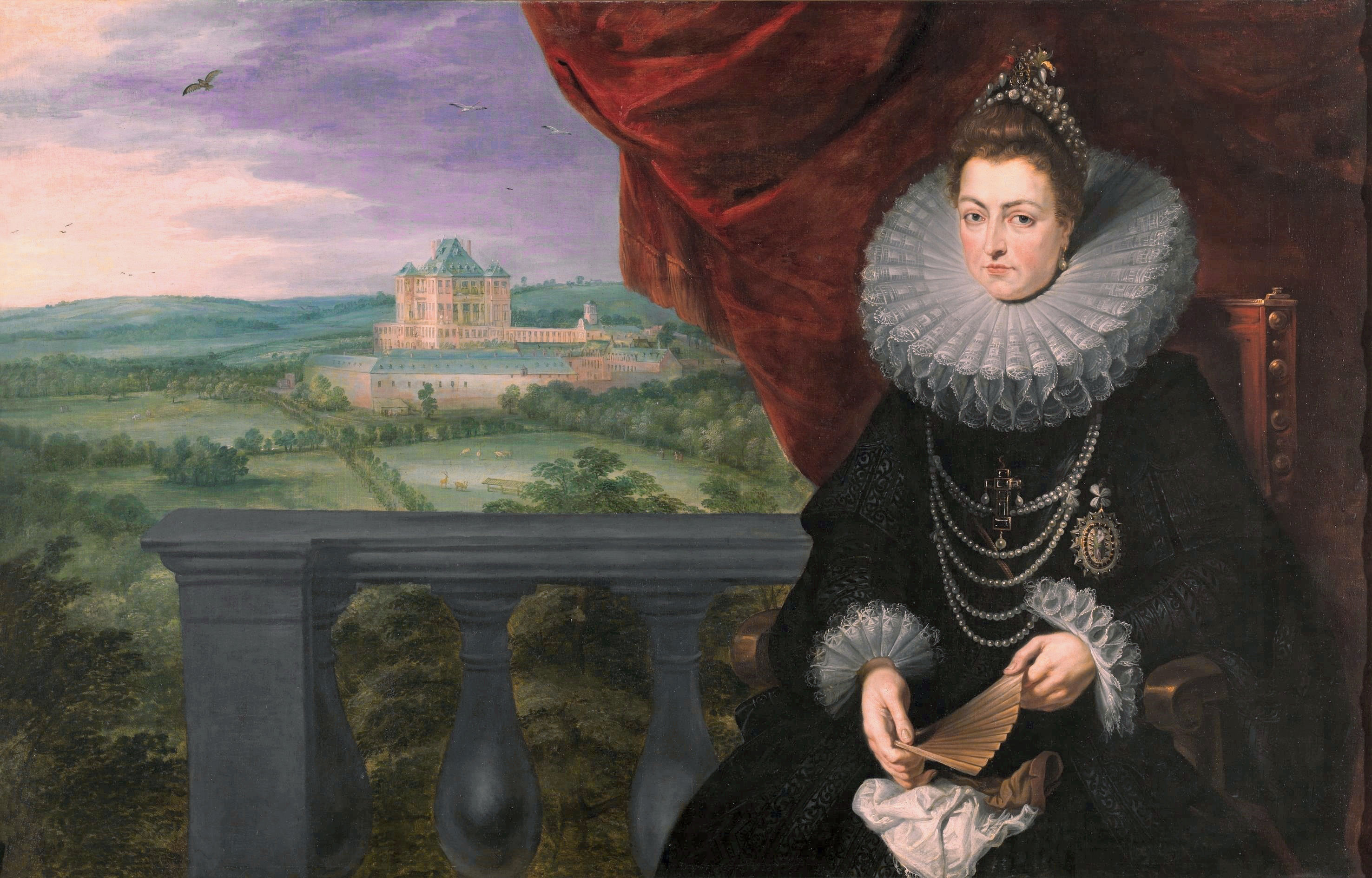
Archduchess Isabella, with Rubens

Jan Brueghel the Elder was born in Brussels as the son of Pieter Bruegel the Elder and Maria (called 'Mayken') Coecke van Aelst. His mother was the daughter of the prominent Flemish Renaissance artists Pieter Coecke van Aelst and Mayken Verhulst. His father died about a year after Jan's birth in 1569. It is believed that after the death of his mother in 1578, Jan, together with his older brother Pieter Brueghel the Younger and sister Marie, went to live with their grandmother Verhulst, who was by then widowed. The early Flemish biographer Karel van Mander wrote in his Schilder-boeck published in 1604 that Verhulst was the first art teacher of her two grandsons. She taught them drawing and watercolour painting of miniatures. Jan and his brother may also have trained with local artists in Brussels who were active as tapestry designers.

Jan and his brother Pieter were then sent to Antwerp to study oil painting. According to Karel van Mander he studied under Peter Goetkint, an important dealer with a large collection of paintings in his shop. Goetkint died on 15 July 1583 not very long after Jan had started his training. It is possible that Jan continued his studies in this shop, which was taken over by Goetkint's widow, as no other master is recorded.

It was common for Flemish painters of that time to travel to Italy to complete their studies. Jan Brueghel left for Italy, first travelling to Cologne where his sister Marie and her family lived. He later visited Frankenthal, an important cultural centre where a number of Flemish landscape artists were active.

He then travelled on to Naples after probably spending time in Venice. In Naples he produced some drawings after June 1590 which show his interest in landscapes and monumental architecture. He worked for Don Francesco Caracciolo, a prominent nobleman and priest and founder of the Clerics Regular Minor. Jan produced small-scale cabinet paintings for Don Francesco.

Brueghel left Naples for Rome where he lived from 1592 to 1594. He befriended Paul Bril, a landscape specialist from Antwerp who had moved to Rome in the late 16th century. Together with his brother Mathijs Bril, he created atmospheric landscapes for many Roman residences. Brueghel took inspiration from Bril's lively drawings and small-scale landscapes of the mid-1590s. During his time in Rome Jan Brueghel became acquainted with Hans Rottenhammer, a German painter of small highly finished cabinet paintings on copper. Rottenhammer painted religious and mythological compositions, combining German and Italian elements of style, which were highly esteemed. Brueghel collaborated with both Bril and Rottenhammer. Brueghel also spent time making watercolours of Rome's antique monuments and seemed particularly fascinated by the vaulted interiors of the Colosseum.

He enjoyed the protection of Cardinal Ascanio Colonna. In Rome he also met Cardinal Federico Borromeo, who played an important role in the Counter-Reformation and was also an avid art collector. The Cardinal became Brueghel's lifelong friend and patron. Brueghel took up residence in Borromeo's Palazzo Vercelli. When Borromeo became archbishop of Milan in June 1595, Brueghel followed him and became part of the Cardinal's household. He produced many landscape and flower paintings for the Cardinal.

Brueghel stayed about a year in Milan and in 1596 he had returned to Antwerp where he remained active, save for a few interruptions, for the rest of his life. A year after his return Jan Brueghel was admitted as a Free Master in Antwerp's Guild of Saint Luke as the son of a master. The artist married on 23 January 1599 in the Cathedral of Our Lady in Antwerp. The bride was Isabella de Jode, the daughter of the cartographer, engraver and publisher Gerard de Jode. Their son Jan was born on 13 September 1601. This first-born had Rubens as his godfather and later took over his father's workshop and was known as Jan Brueghel the Younger.

Brueghel was registered as a burgher of Antwerp on 4 October 1601 as 'Jan Bruegel, Peetersone, schilder, van Bruessele' ('Jan Bruegel, son of Peeter, painter, of Brussels'). Just a month before, Brueghel had been elected dean of the Guild of Saint Luke, but he had not been able to take up the position as he was not a burgher of Antwerp. Upon becoming formally registered as a burgher the same year Brueghel could finally be the dean. The next year he was re-elected as dean.

In 1603 his daughter Paschasia Brueghel was born. Rubens was also her godfather. His wife Isabella de Jode died the same year leaving him with two young children. It has been speculated that death of his wife was linked to the birth of his latest child.

In the mid-1604 Brueghel visited Prague, the main location of the court of Rudolf II, Holy Roman Emperor, who promoted artistic innovation. The Emperor's court had attracted many Northern artists such as Bartholomeus Spranger and Hans von Aachen who created a new affected style, full of conceits, today known as Northern Mannerism.

Upon returning to Antwerp in September 1604 Brueghel bought a large house called "De Meerminne" (The Mermaid) in the Lange Nieuwstraat in Antwerp on 20 September 1604. The artist remarried in April 1605. With his second wife Catharina van Mariënburg he had 8 children of whom Ambrosius became a painter.

After his appointment in 1606 as court painter to the Archduke and Duchess Albrecht and Isabella, sovereigns of the Spanish Netherlands, the artist was present in Brussels for periods in 1606, 1609, 1610 and 1613. On 28 August 1613 the court in Brussels paid Brueghel 3625 guilders for completing various works.

From October 1610 onwards Rubens started taking on the role of intermediary for his friend Jan Brueghel. By 1625 Rubens had written about 25 letters to Cardinal Borromeo on behalf of Brueghel. In a letter to Borromeo Brueghel referred, jokingly, to his friend's role as that of "mio secretario Rubens" (my secretary Rubens). In 1612 or 1613 Peter Paul Rubens painted a portrait of Jan Brueghel and his family (Courtauld Institute, London). In 1613 he accompanied Rubens and Hendrick van Balen the Elder on a diplomatic mission to the Dutch Republic. Here they met Hendrick Goltzius and other Haarlem artists.

When John Ernest, Duke of Saxe-Eisenach passed through Antwerp in 1614 he took time to pay a visit to Rubens and Brueghel in their workshops. Brueghel received many official commissions from the Antwerp city magistrate. Four of his paintings were offered by the Antwerp city magistrates to the Archduke and Duchess Albrecht and Isabella on 27 August 1615. He was in 1618 one of twelve important painters from Antwerp who were commissioned by the Antwerp city magistrates to produce a series of paintings for the Archduke and Duchess Albrecht and Isabella. For this commission, Brueghel coordinated the work on a painting cycle depicting an Allegory of the Five Senses. The artists participating in the project included Rubens, Frans Snyders, Frans Francken the Younger, Joos de Momper, Hendrick van Balen the Elder and Sebastiaen Vrancx. The works were destroyed in a fire in 1713.

On 9 March 1619 Brueghel bought a third house called Den Bock (the Billy Goat) located in the Antwerp Arenbergstraat. When on 6 August 1623 his daughter Clara Eugenia was baptised, Archduchess Isabella and Cardinal Borromeo were her godparents. Jan Brueghel died on 13 January 1625 in Antwerp from complications arising from a gastrointestinal upset.

The artist's estate was distributed on 3 June and 23 June 1627 among his surviving wife and his children from both marriages. Rubens, Hendrick van Balen the Elder, Cornelis Schut and Paulus van Halmaele were the executors of his last will. Rubens was the guardian of the surviving Brueghel children.

His students included his son Jan as well as Daniel Seghers. Brueghel's daughter Paschasia married the painter Hieronymus van Kessel the Younger, and their son Jan van Kessel the Elder studied with Jan Brueghel the Younger. Brueghel's daughter Anna married David Teniers the Younger in 1637.

== Work ==
=== General ===
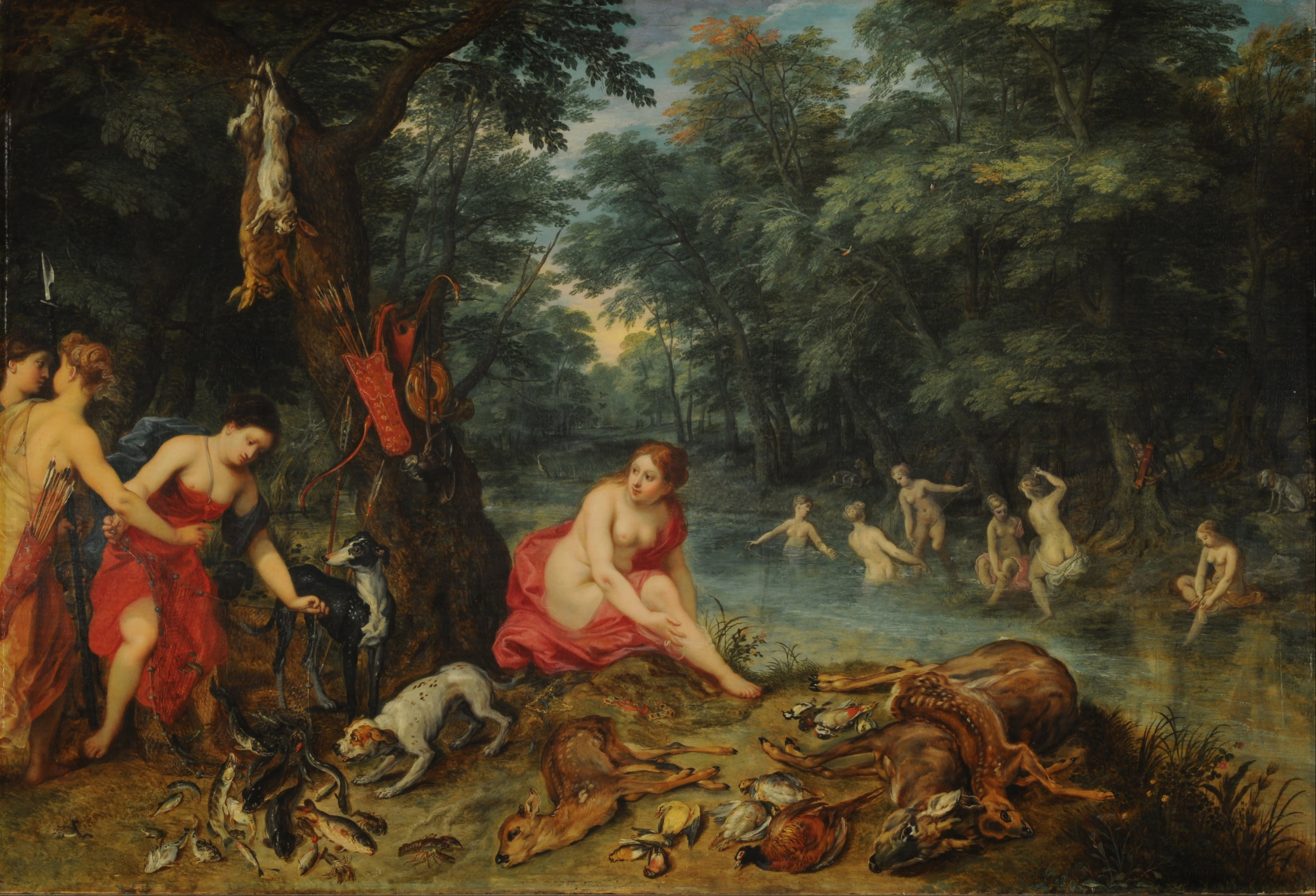
Bath of the Nymphs

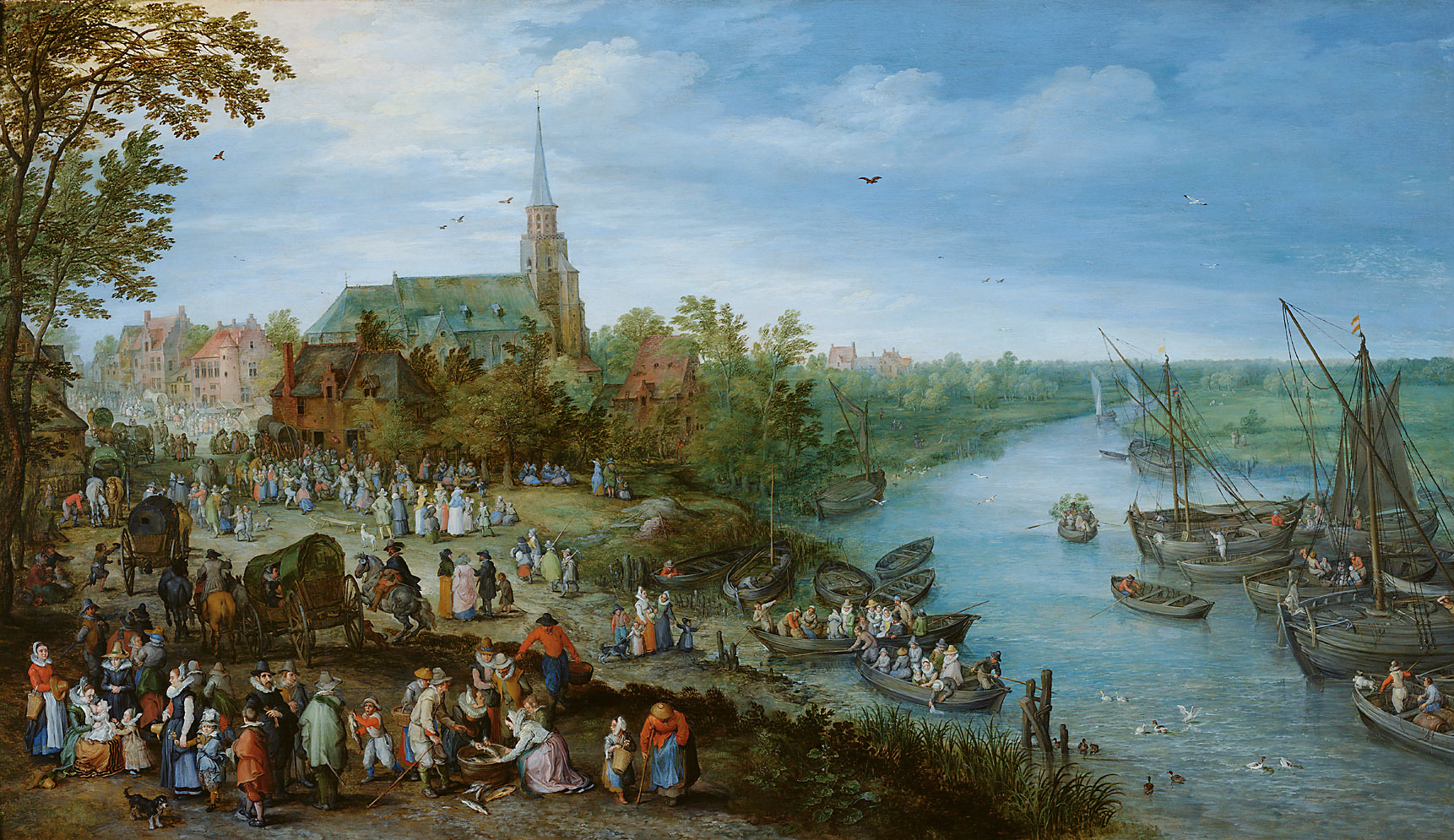
Village Kermis in Schelle with self-portrait

Jan Brueghel the Elder was a versatile artist who practised in many genres and introduced various new subjects into Flemish art. He was an innovator who contributed to the development of the various genres to which he put his hand such as flower still lifes, landscapes and seascapes, hunting pieces, battle scenes and scenes of hellfire and the underworld. His best-known innovations are the new types of paintings, which he introduced into the repertoire of Flemish art in the first quarter of the 17th century such as flower garland paintings, paradise landscapes and paintings of art galleries. Unlike contemporary Flemish Baroque artists, such as Rubens, he did not produce large altarpieces for the local churches.

Jan Brueghel the Elder rendered materials, animals, and landscapes accurately and with a high degree of finish. He used a miniaturist technique to describe nature.

Little is known about the workshop practices of Brueghel. He operated a large workshop that allowed him to produce a large quantity of works, which were in turn reproduced in his workshop. After Brueghel's death in 1625, Jan Brueghel the Younger took charge of his father's workshop which he operated in the same way as his father. This is clear in the style of the surviving paintings which are in the vein of his father's and the continued collaboration with former collaborators of his father such as Rubens and Hendrick van Balen. This workshop production contributed to the wide distribution of Jan Brueghel the Elder's creations.

While his brother Pieter was engaged in the large-scale production of numerous works for the Antwerp art market, Jan Brueghel worked for a select clientele of aristocratic patrons and collectors of pictures to create more expensive and exclusive images. His works, such as his paradise landscapes, appealed to the aesthetic preferences of aristocrats who loved collecting such precious objects. His works, often painted on copper, were luxury objects intended for the simple pleasure of viewing as well as contemplation.

=== Collaborations ===
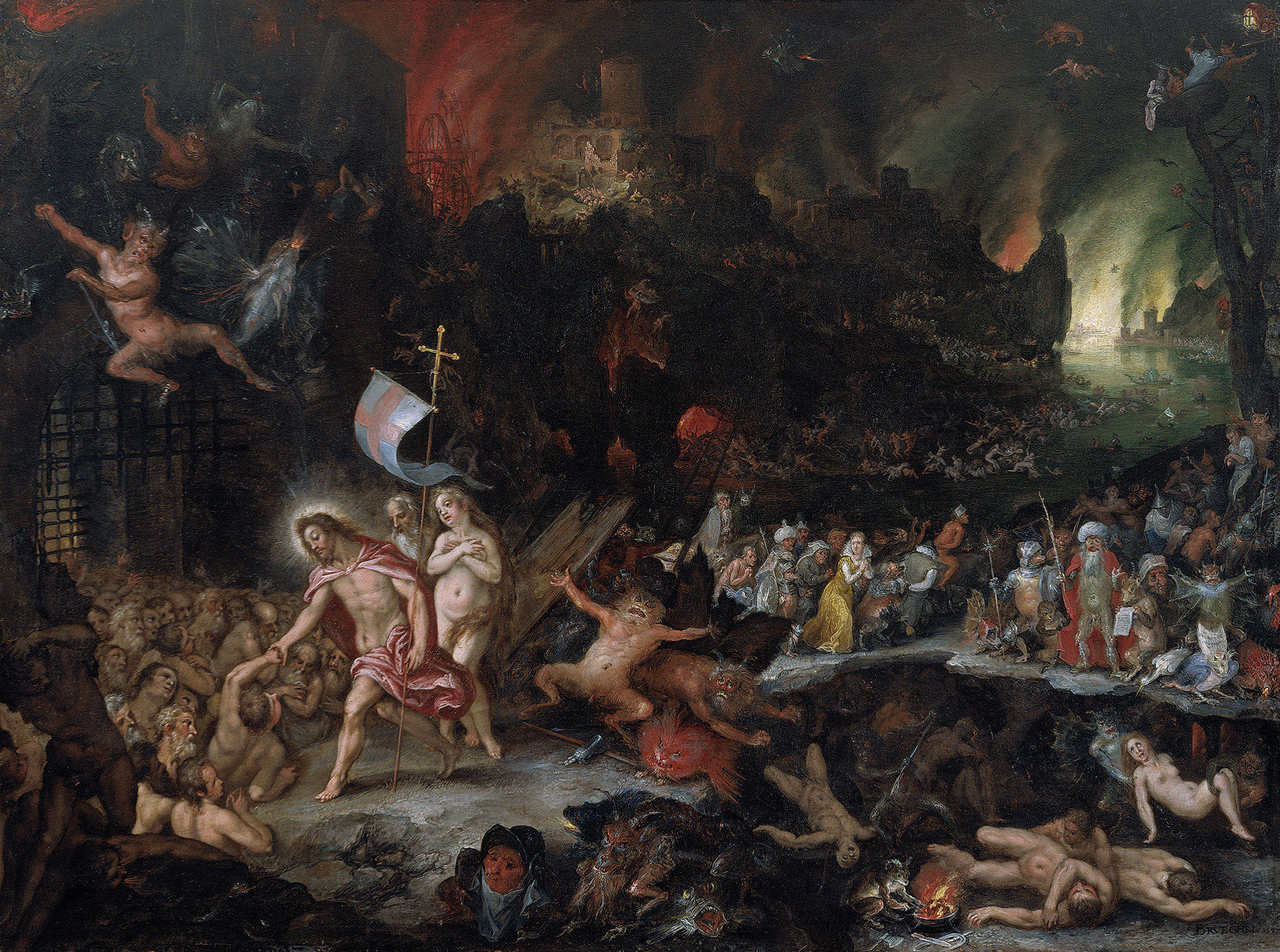
Christ in Limbo, with Hans Rottenhammer

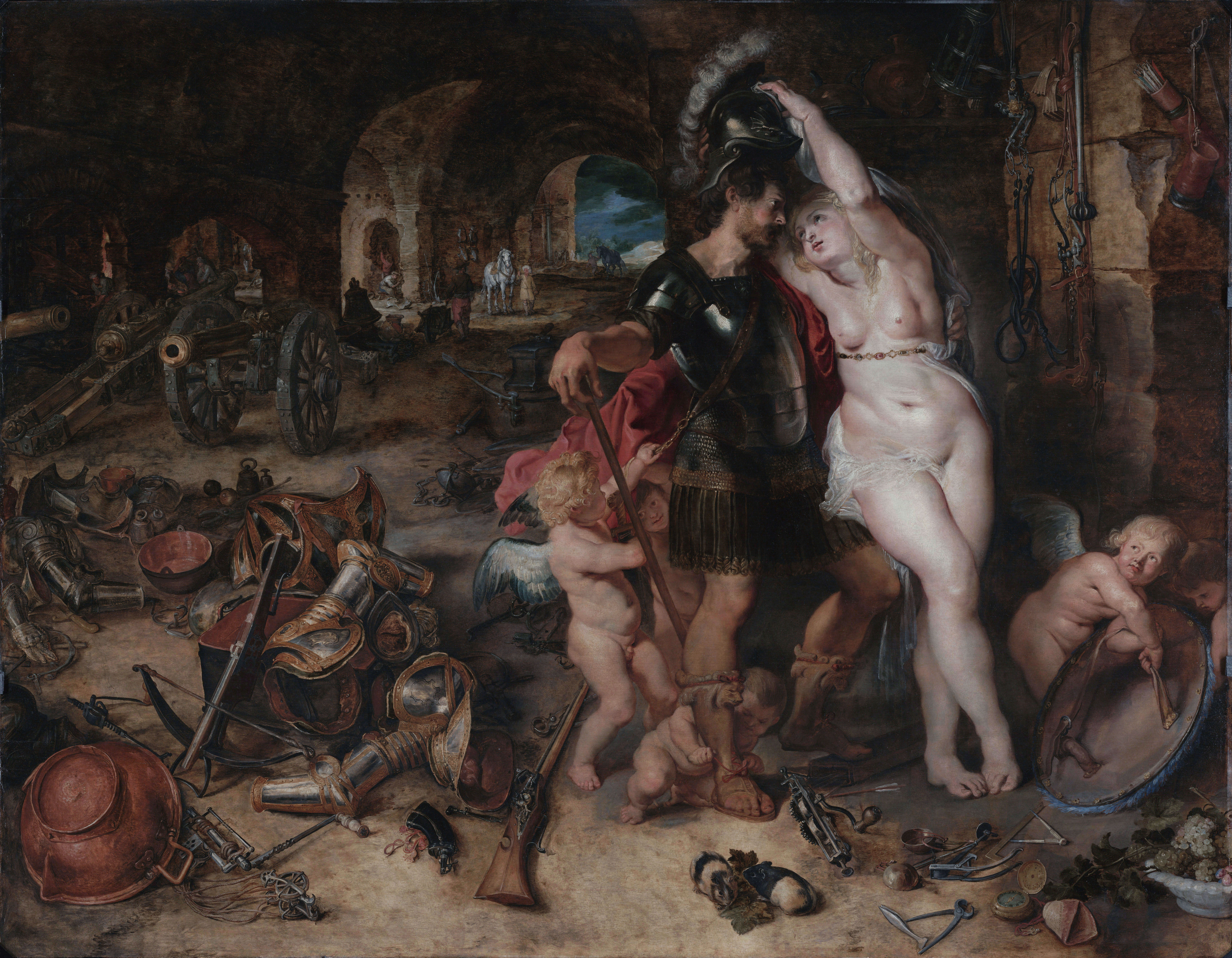
The Return from War: Mars Disarmed by Venus, with Rubens

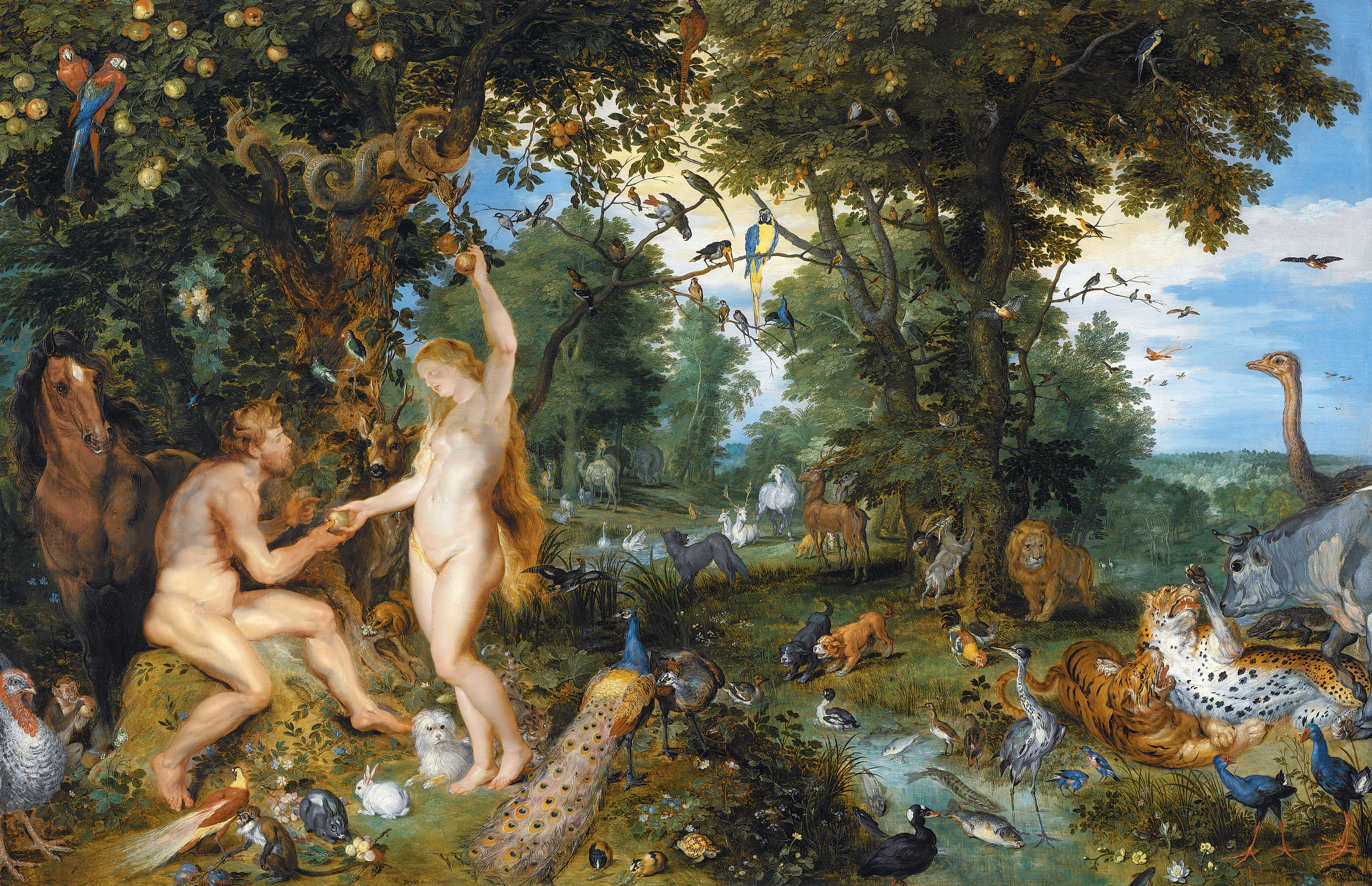
Paradise with the Fall of Man, with Rubens

Collaboration between artists specialised in distinctive genres was a defining feature of artistic practice in 17th-century Antwerp. Jan Brueghel was likewise a frequent collaborator with fellow artists. As he was an artist with a wide range of skills he worked with a number of collaborators in various genres. His collaborators included landscape artists Paul Bril and Joos de Momper, architectural painter Paul Vredeman de Vries and figure painters Frans Francken the Younger, Hendrick de Clerck, Pieter van Avont and Hendrick van Balen the Elder.

His collaborations with figure painter Hans Rottenhammer began in Rome around 1595 and ended in 1610. Rottenhammer was a gifted figure painter and known for his skill in painting nudes. Initially when the artists both lived in Venice, their collaborative works were executed on canvas, but in their later collaborations after Brueghel had returned to Antwerp they typically used copper. After Brueghel's return to Antwerp, their collaboration practice was for Brueghel to send the coppers with the landscape to Rottenhammer in Venice, who painted in the figures and then returned the coppers. In a few instances, the process was the other way around. Brueghel and Rottenhammer did not collaborate only on landscape paintings with figures; they jointly created one of the earliest devotional garland paintings, made for Cardinal Federico Borromeo, depicting a Virgin and Child surrounded by a flower garland (Pinacoteca Ambrosiana).

While in his collaborations with Hans Rottenhammer, the landscapes were made by Brueghel, the roles were reversed when he worked with Joos de Momper as it was Brueghel who provided the figures to the landscapes painted by de Momper. An example of their collaboration is Mountain Landscape with Pilgrims in a Grotto Chapel (c. 1616, Liechtenstein Museum). There are about 59 known collaborations between Brueghel and de Momper making de Momper his most frequent collaborator. Hendrick van Balen the Elder was another regular collaborator with Jan Brueghel. Their collaboration was simplified by the fact that from 1604 onwards both painters had moved to the Lange Nieuwstraat, which made it easier to carry the panels and copper plates on which they collaborated back and forth.

Another frequent collaborator of Jan Brueghel was Rubens. The two artists executed about 25 joint works between 1598 and 1625. Their first collaboration was on The Battle of the Amazons (c. 1598-1600, Sanssouci Picture Gallery). The artists worked together in the development of the genre of the devotional garland painting with works such as the Madonna in a Floral Wreath (c. 1616-'18, Alte Pinakothek). They further jointly made mythological scenes and an allegorical series representing the Five Senses. The collaboration between the two friends was remarkable because they worked in very different styles and specialisations and were artists of equal status. They were able to preserve the individuality of their respective styles in these joint works.

Brueghel appears to have been the principal initiator of their joint works, which were made principally during the second half of the 1610s when their method of collaboration had become more systemised and included Rubens' workshop. Usually it would be Brueghel who started a painting and he would leave space for Rubens to add the figures. In their early collaborations they seem to have made major corrections to the work of the other. For instance, in the early collaborative effort The Return from War: Mars Disarmed by Venus Rubens overpainted most of the lower-right corner with grey paint so he could enlarge his figures. In later collaborations the artists seem to have streamlined their collaboration and agreed on the composition early on so that these later works show little underdrawing. As court painters to the archdukes their collaborations reflected the court's desire to emphasise the continuity of its reign with the previous Burgundian and Habsburg rulers as well as the rulers' piousness. While they were mindful of the prevailing tastes in courtly circles, which favoured subjects such as the hunt, the two artists were creative in their response to the court's preferences by devising new iconography and genres, such as the devotional garland paintings, which were equally capable of conveying the devoutness and splendour of the archducal court. The joint artistic output of Brueghel and Rubens was highly prized by collectors all over Europe.

=== Ideological context ===
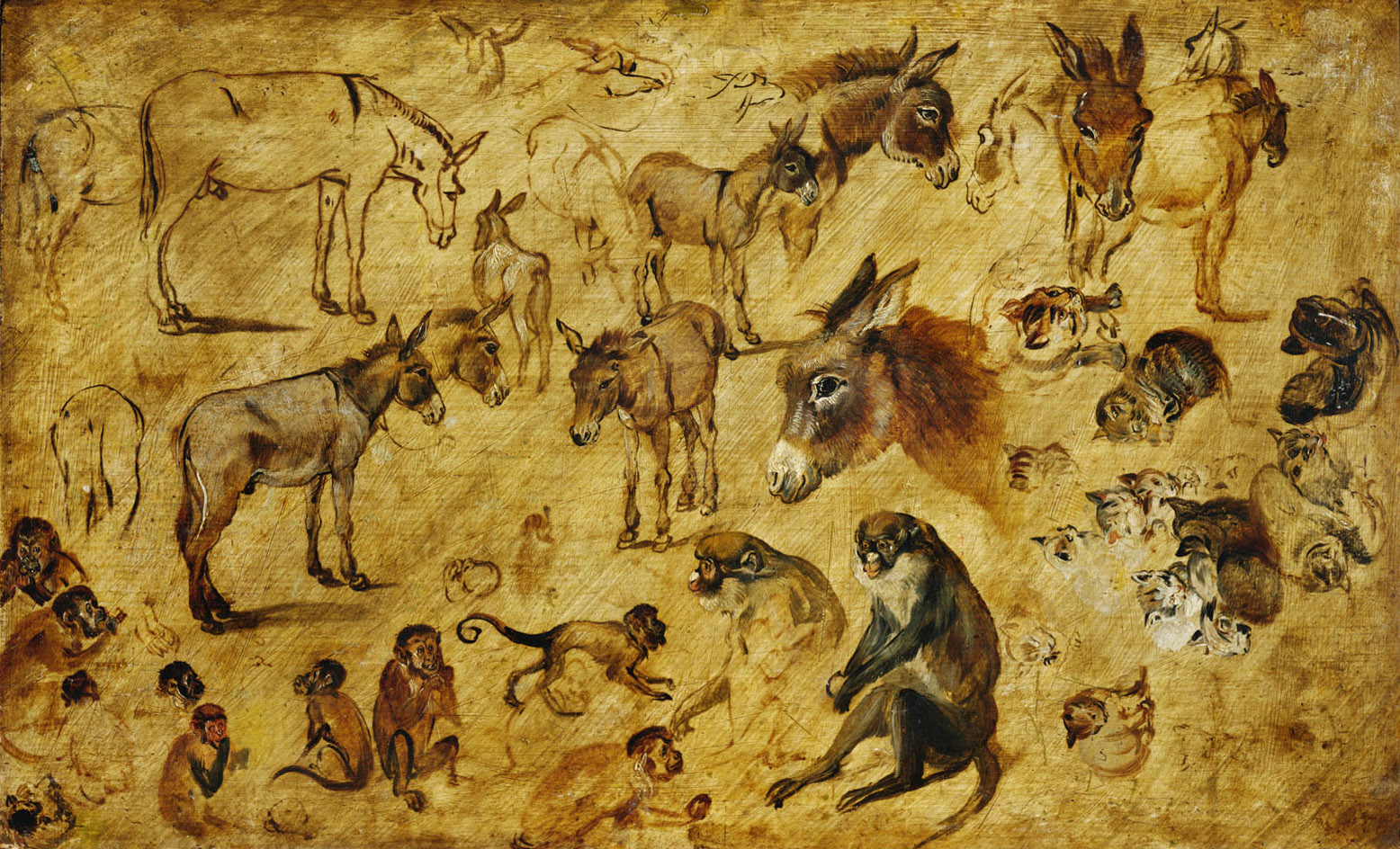
Studies of animals

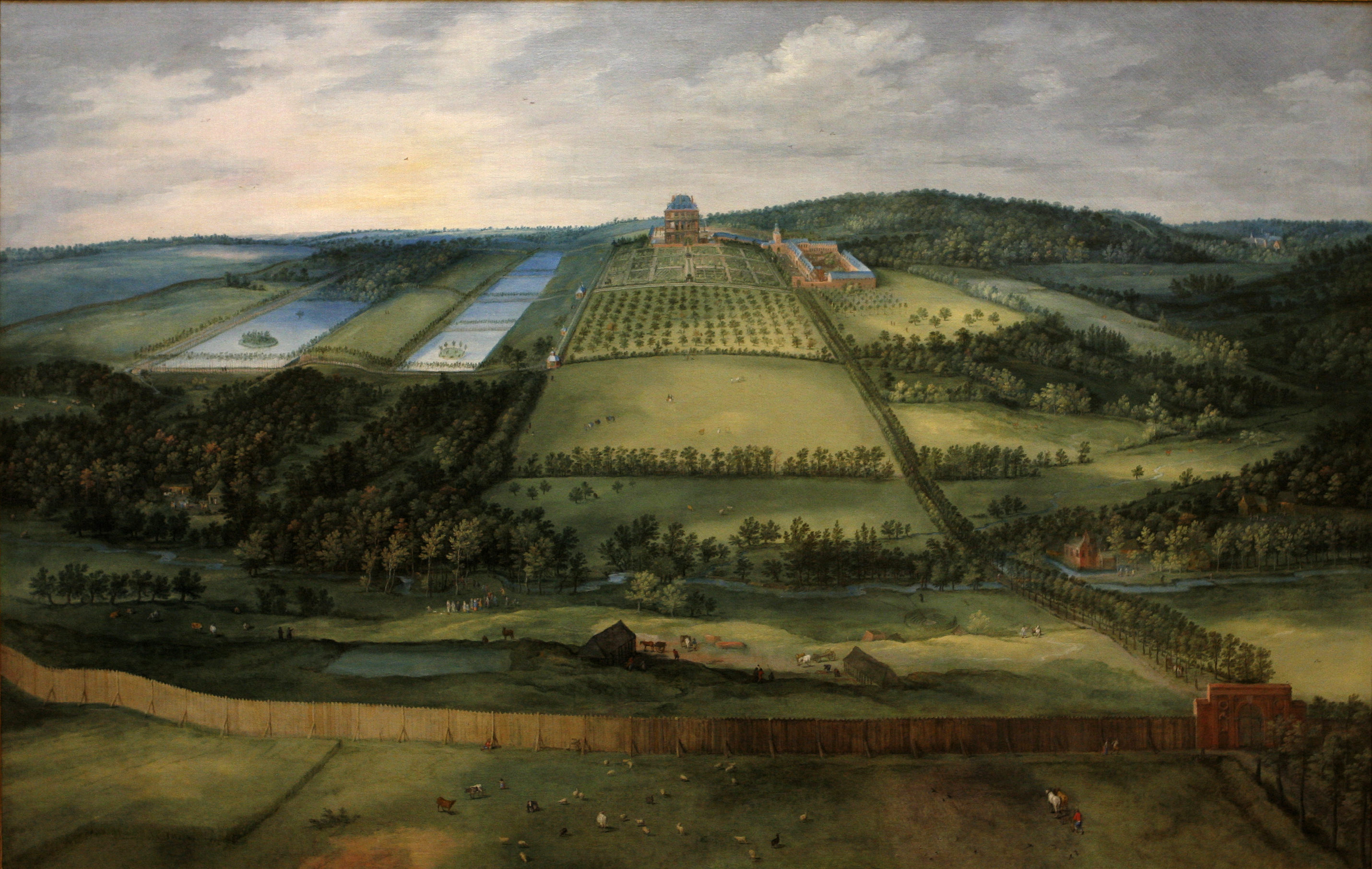
The Castle of Mariemont

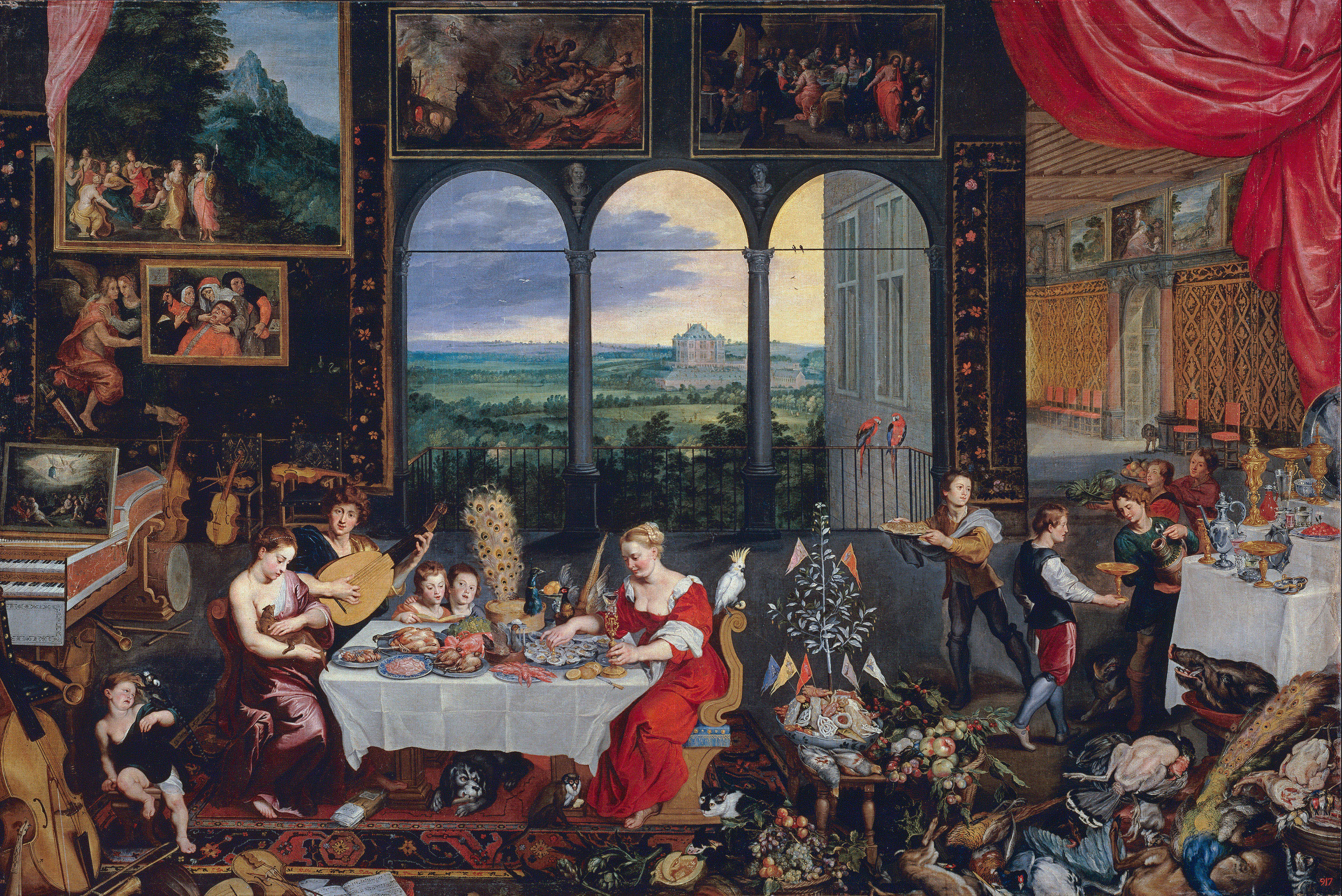
The Senses of Hearing, Touch, and Taste

Jan Brueghel's work reflects the various ideological currents at work in the Catholic Spanish Netherlands during his lifetime. The Catholic Counter-Reformation's worldview played an important role in the artist's practice. Central in this worldview was the belief that the earth and its inhabitants were revelations of a supreme being, God. Artistic representation of, and scientific investigation into, that divine revelation was encouraged and valued. Breughel's friend and patron, the Counter-Reformation Cardinal Federico Borromeo, particularly emphasised the beauty and diversity of the animal world. In his I tre libri delle laudi divine (published only posthumously in 1632) Borromeo wrote: 'Looking then with attentive study at animals' construction and formation, and at their parts, members, and characters, can it not be said how excellently divine wisdom has demonstrated the value of its great works?' Jan Brueghel's realistic depictions of nature in all its various forms, in flowers, landscapes, animals, etc., was clearly in line with the view that study of God's creation was an important source for knowing God.

Brueghel's era also saw a growing interest in the study of nature through empirical evidence as opposed to relying on inherited tradition. The increased access to new animals and exotic plants from the newly discovered territories played an important role in this intellectual exploration. This resulted in the appearance of the first scholarly catalogues and encyclopaedias, including the illustrated natural history catalogues of 16th-century naturalists Conrad Gesner and Ulisse Aldrovandi. Their major contribution to natural history was the creation of an extensive system of description of each animal. Gesner placed all the species within four general categories: quadrupeds, birds, fish and serpents. He described animals in alphabetical order and in terms of nomenclature, geographic origins, mode of living and behaviour. Aldrovandi took another approach and did not order animals alphabetically. He relied on visual resemblance as the classifying factor. For example, he grouped the horse together with analogous animals, such as the donkey and mule, and separated species into categories, such as birds with webbed feet and nocturnal birds.

Brueghel's works reflect this contemporary encyclopaedic interest in the classification and ordering of all of the natural world. This is evidenced in his flower pieces, landscapes, allegorical works and gallery paintings. In his paradise landscapes, for instance, Brueghel grouped most of the species according to their basic categories of biological classification, in other words, according to the main groups of related species that resemble one another, such as birds or quadrupeds. He further classified most of them into subdivisions consisting of similar morphological and behavioural characteristics. His paradise landscapes thus constituted a visual catalogue of animals and birds which fulfilled the role of micro-encyclopaedia.

Brueghel's endeavour to represent the world through ordering and classifying its many elements based on empirical observation did not stop with the natural world. In Prague he had acquired knowledge of the large collections of Emperor Rudolf II, which were divided in natural, artificial and scientific objects. Brueghel's allegorical paintings of the four elements and of the five senses reveal the same classifying obsession, using each element or sense to organise natural, man-made instruments and scientific objects. In this skillful union of the areas of art, science, and nature Brueghel demonstrates his mastery of these various disciplines. His paintings serve the same purpose to that of encyclopaedic collections, then known as cabinets of curiosities, by linking between the mundus sensibilis and the mundus intelligibilis. His approach to describing and cataloguing nature in art resembles the distinction natural historians were starting to make between perceptual experience and theoretical knowledge.

Brueghel's obsession with classifying the world was completely in line with the encyclopaedic tastes of the court in Brussels as is demonstrated by their large art collection of predominantly Flemish paintings, menagerie of exotic species and extensive library.

=== Flower paintings ===
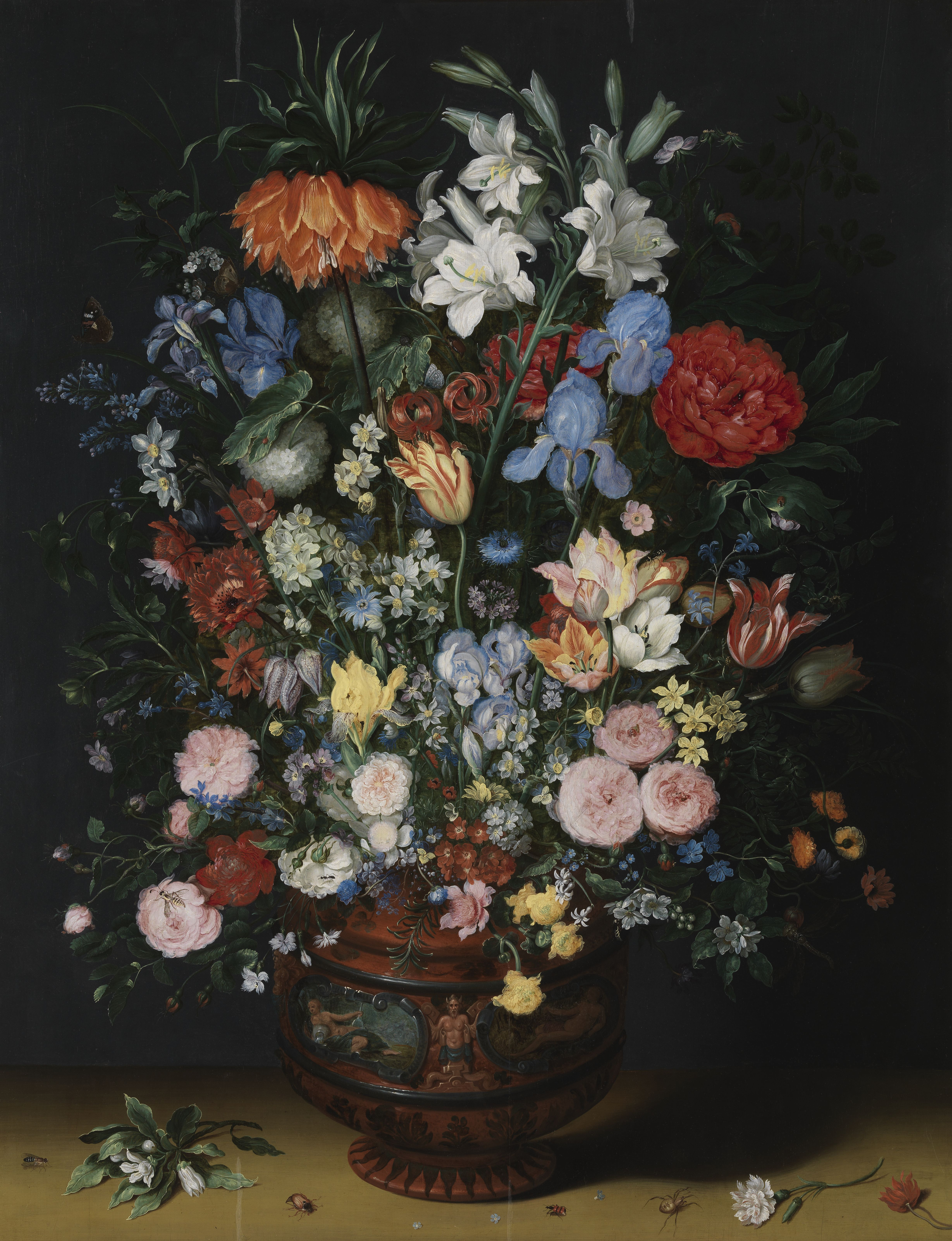
Flowers in a Ceramic Vase, Royal Museum of Fine Arts Antwerp

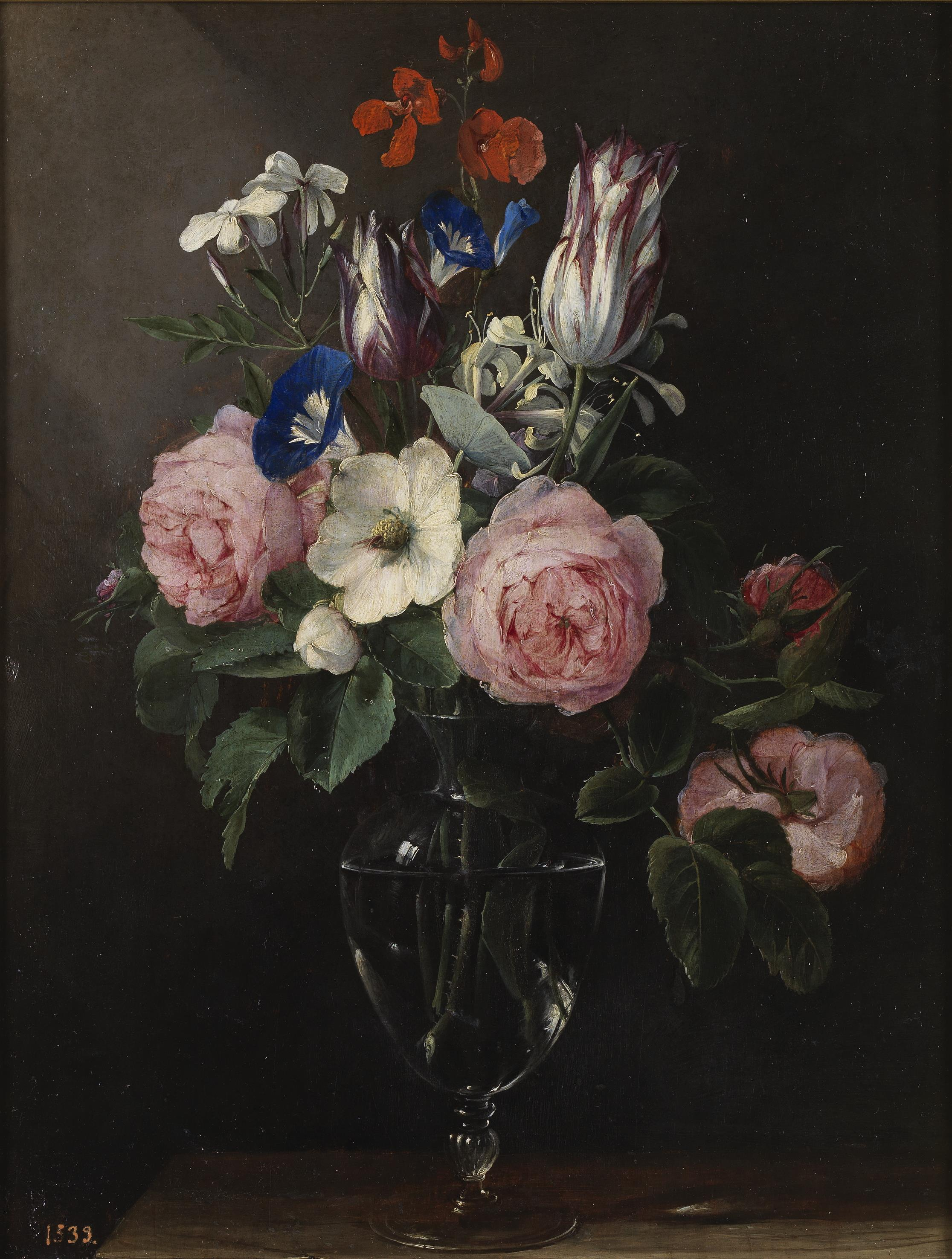
Flower Vase

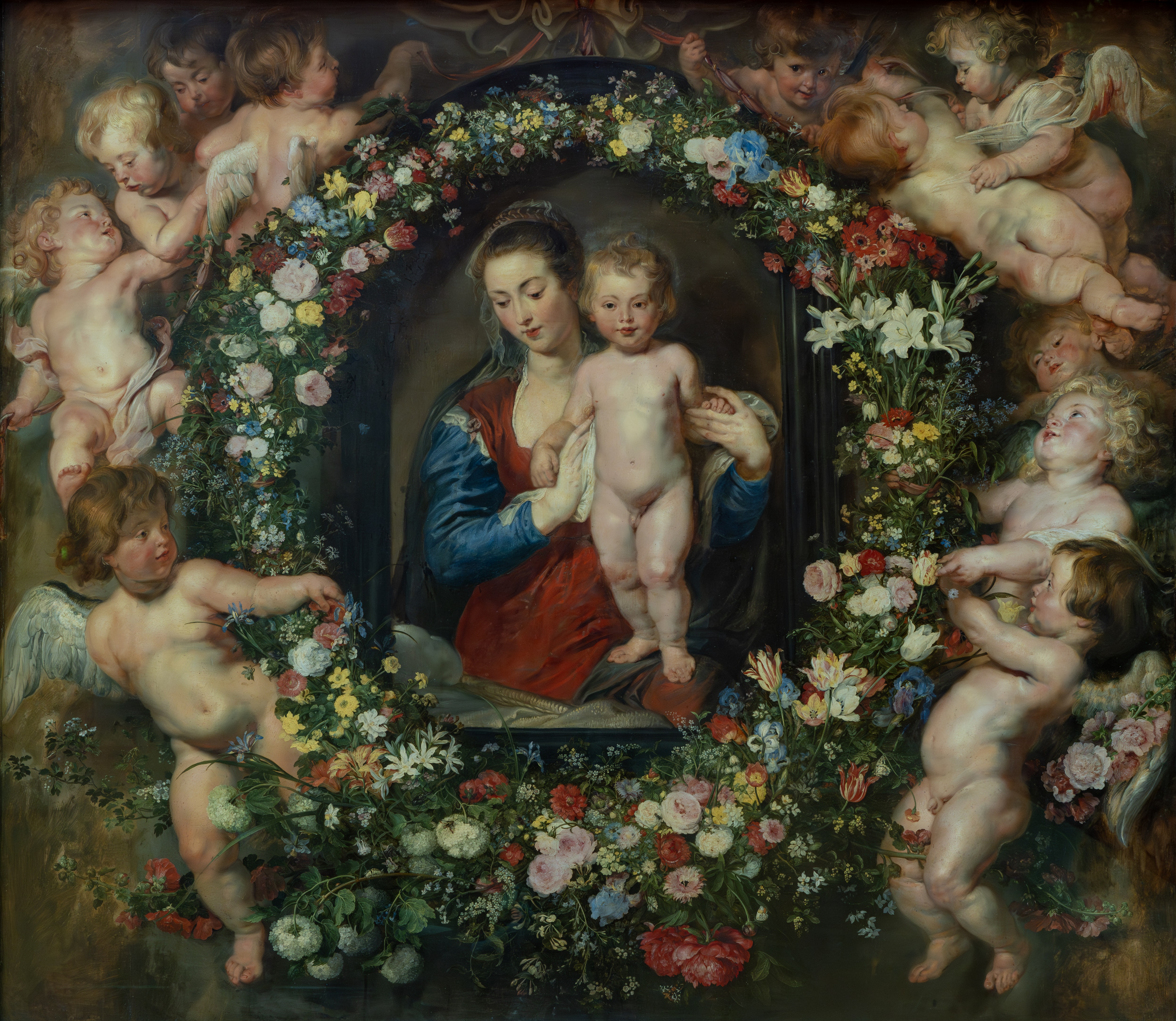
Madonna in a Floral Wreath, with Rubens

Jan Brueghel the Elder was one of the first artists in the Habsburg Netherlands who started to paint pure flower still lifes. A pure flower still life depicts flowers, typically arranged in a vase or other vessel, as the principal subject of the picture, rather than as a subordinate part of another work such as a history painting. Jan Brueghel is regarded as an important contributor to the emerging genre of the flower piece in Northern art, a contribution that was already appreciated in his time when he received the nickname 'Flower Brueghel'. While the traditional interpretation of these flower pieces was that they were vanitas symbols or allegories of transience with hidden meanings, it is now more common to interpret them as mere depictions of the natural world. Brueghel's approach to these works was informed by his desire to display his skill in giving a realistic, almost scientific rendering of nature. These works reflected the ideological concerns demonstrated in his work, which combined the worldview that nature was a revelation of a god with the interest in gaining a scientific understanding of nature.

Brueghel's flower pieces are dominated by the floral arrangements, which are placed against a neutral dark background. Minor details such as insects, butterflies, snails and separate sprays of flowers or rosemary may occasionally be added but are subordinate to the principal subject. While Brueghel sought out very rare flowers, he used certain common blooms such as tulips, irises and roses to anchor his bouquets. This may have been a response to his patrons' wishes as well as compositional considerations. His bouquets were typically composed of flowers blooming in different seasons of the year so they could never have been painted together directly from nature. Brueghel was in the habit of travelling to make drawings of flowers that were not available in Antwerp, so that he could paint them into his bouquets. Brueghel rendered the flowers with an almost scientific precision. He arranged each flower with hardly any overlap so that they are shown off to their best advantage, and many are shown at different angles. The flowers are arranged by size with smaller ones at the bottom of the bouquet, larger flowers such as tulips, cornflowers, peonies and guelder roses in the centre and large flowers, such as white lilies and blue irises, at the top of the bouquet.

This arrangement is clear in the Flowers in a Ceramic Vase (c. 1620, Royal Museum of Fine Arts Antwerp). The vase in which the flowers are arranged is decorated with motifs in relief. The two cartouches - separated by a fantastic figure - show Amphitrite, a sea goddess from Greek mythology, on the left, and Ceres, the Roman corn goddess, on the right. These two goddesses were typically used in allegorical representations of the four elements to symbolise water and earth respectively. The other two cartouches on that part of the vase that is invisible likely show Vulcan, who was associated with fire, and Apollo, who was associated with air. The occurrence of the four elements and the flowers in a single work can be interpreted as the emanation of the macrocosm in the microcosm.

Brueghel often repeated motifs in his flower pieces, although each work has its own character.

=== Garland paintings ===
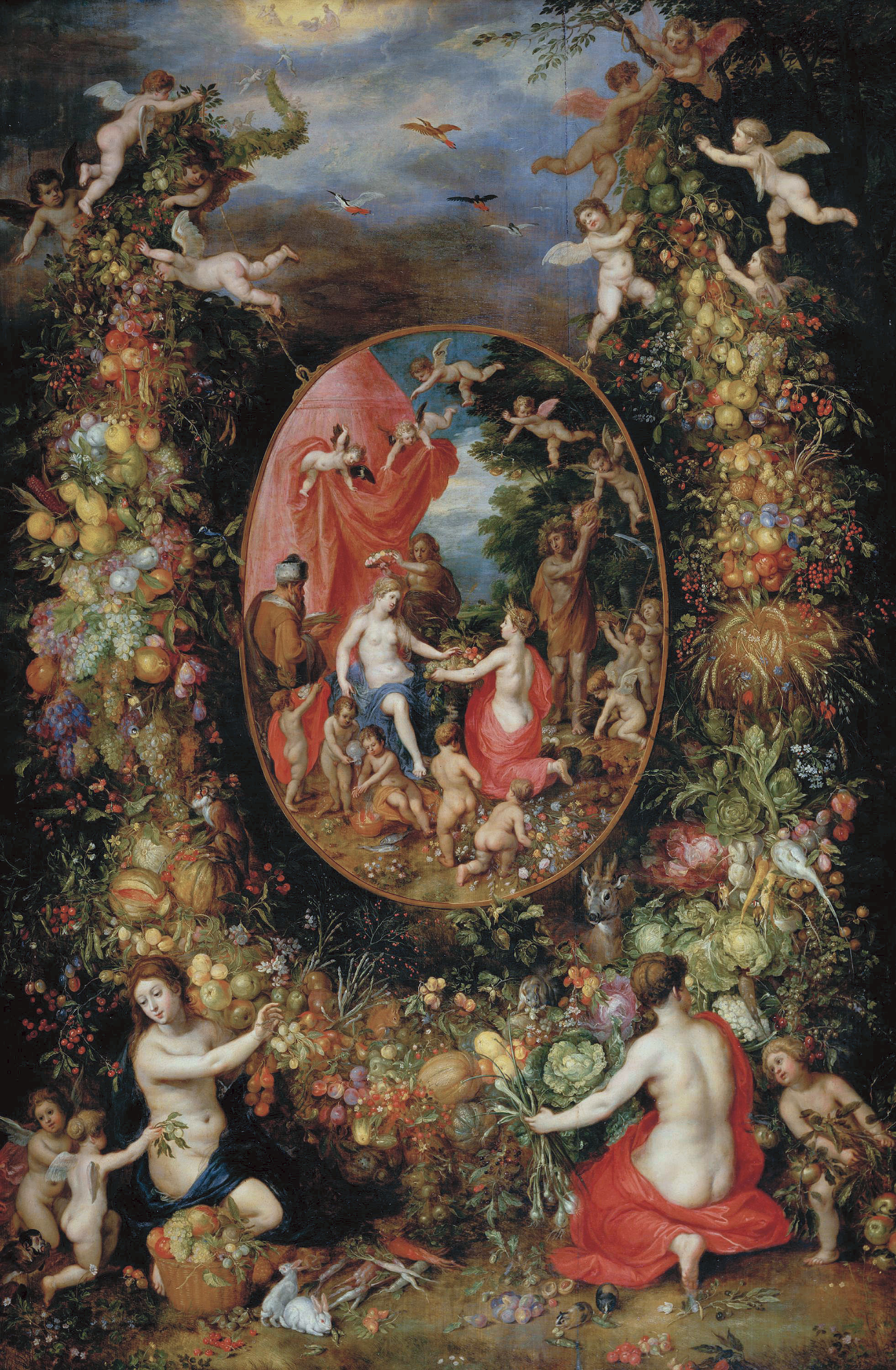
Garland of Fruit surrounding a Depiction of Cybele Receiving Gifts from Personifications of the Four Seasons

Jan Brueghel the Elder played a key role in the invention and development of the genre of garland paintings. Garland paintings typically show a flower garland around a devotional image or portrait. Together with Hendrick van Balen, he painted around 1607-1608 the first known garland painting for Italian cardinal Federico Borromeo, a passionate art collector and Catholic reformer. Borromeo requested the painting to respond to the destruction of images of the Virgin in the preceding century and it thus combined both the cardinal's interests in Catholic reform and the arts. Brueghel, the still life specialist, painted the flower garland, while van Balen, a specialist figure painter, was responsible for the image of the Virgin.

The genre of garland paintings was inspired by the cult of veneration and devotion to Mary prevalent at the Habsburg court (then the rulers over the Habsburg Netherlands) and in Antwerp generally. The genre was initially connected to the visual imagery of the Counter-Reformation movement. Garland paintings were usually collaborations between a still life and a figure painter. Brueghel's collaborators on garland paintings included Rubens, Frans Francken the Younger and Pieter van Avont.

An example of a collaborative garland painting made by Jan Brueghel the Elder and Rubens is the Madonna in Floral Wreath (1621, Alte Pinakothek).

An example of a collaborative garland painting he made with Hendrick van Balen is the Garland of Fruit surrounding a Depiction of a Goddess Receiving Gifts from Personifications of the Four Seasons of which there are two versions, one in the Belfius collection and a second in the Mauritshuis in The Hague. Both versions are considered to be autograph paintings, but small differences between the two suggest that the panel in the Belfius collection is the original version. The medallion in the centre is traditionally believed to depict Cybele, the ancient Phrygian goddess of the earth and nature as it was described as such in 1774 when it was catalogued in the collection of William V, Prince of Orange in The Hague. More recently an identification of the goddess with Ceres, the Roman goddess of agriculture, grain crops, fertility and motherly relationships, has been proposed. The reason is that the goddess in the medallion has none of the attributes traditionally connected with Cybele. Around the medallion is suspended a garland of flowers, vegetables and fruit – a tribute to the goddess and an ode to plenty and fertility. Van Balen painted the medallion while Brueghel painted the abundant garland, the surrounding figures and the numerous animals.

=== Landscapes ===
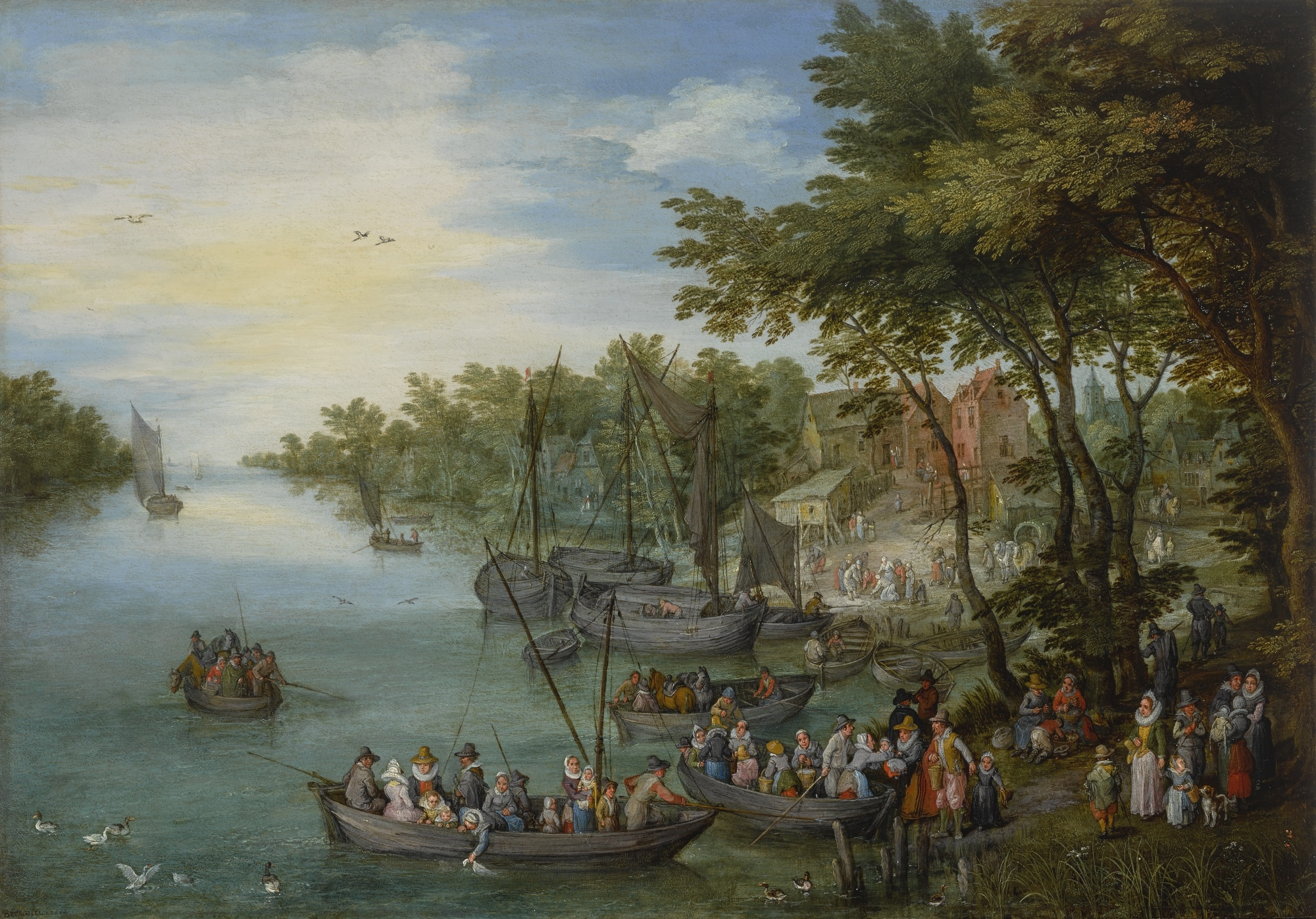
River landscape

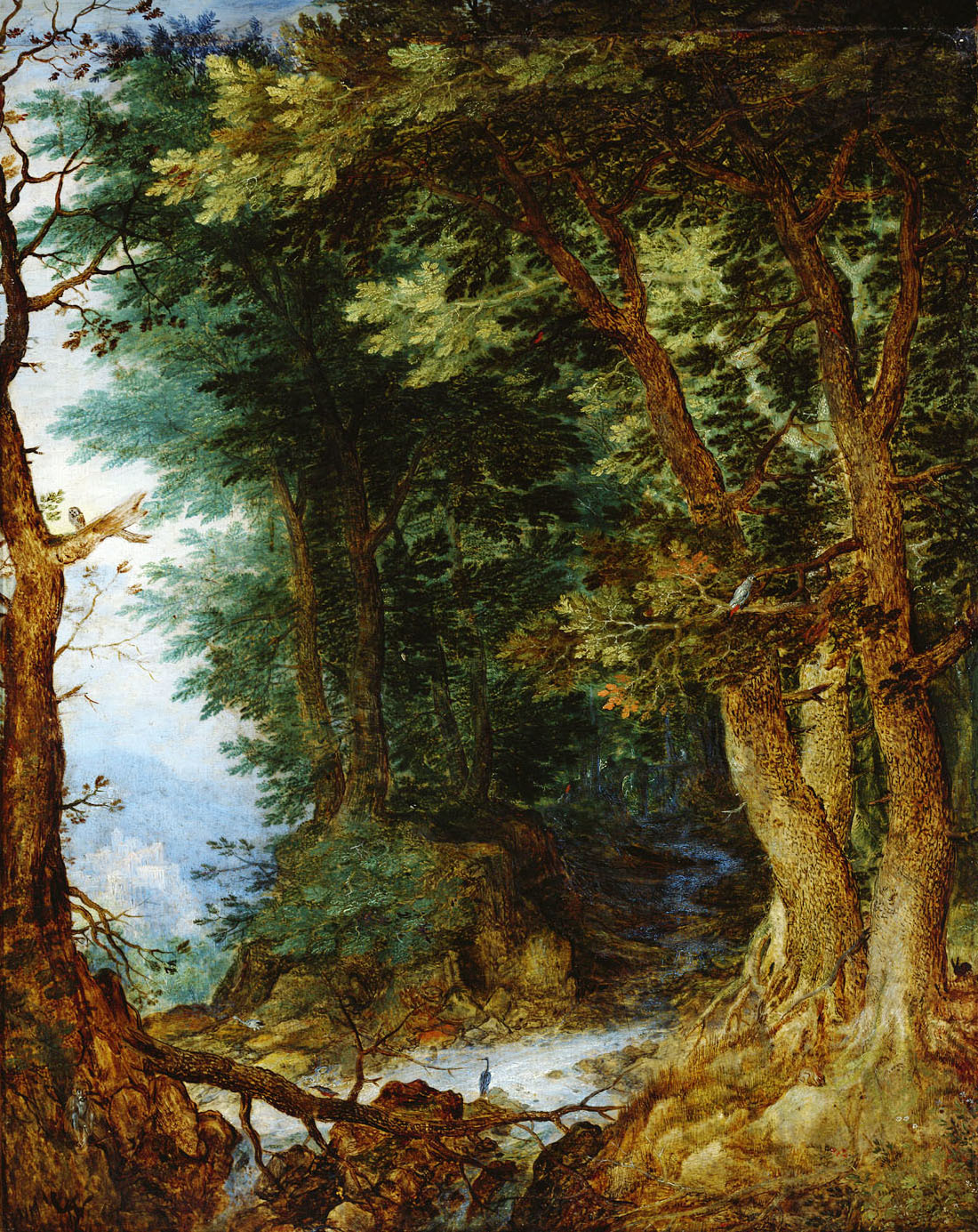
Forest landscape

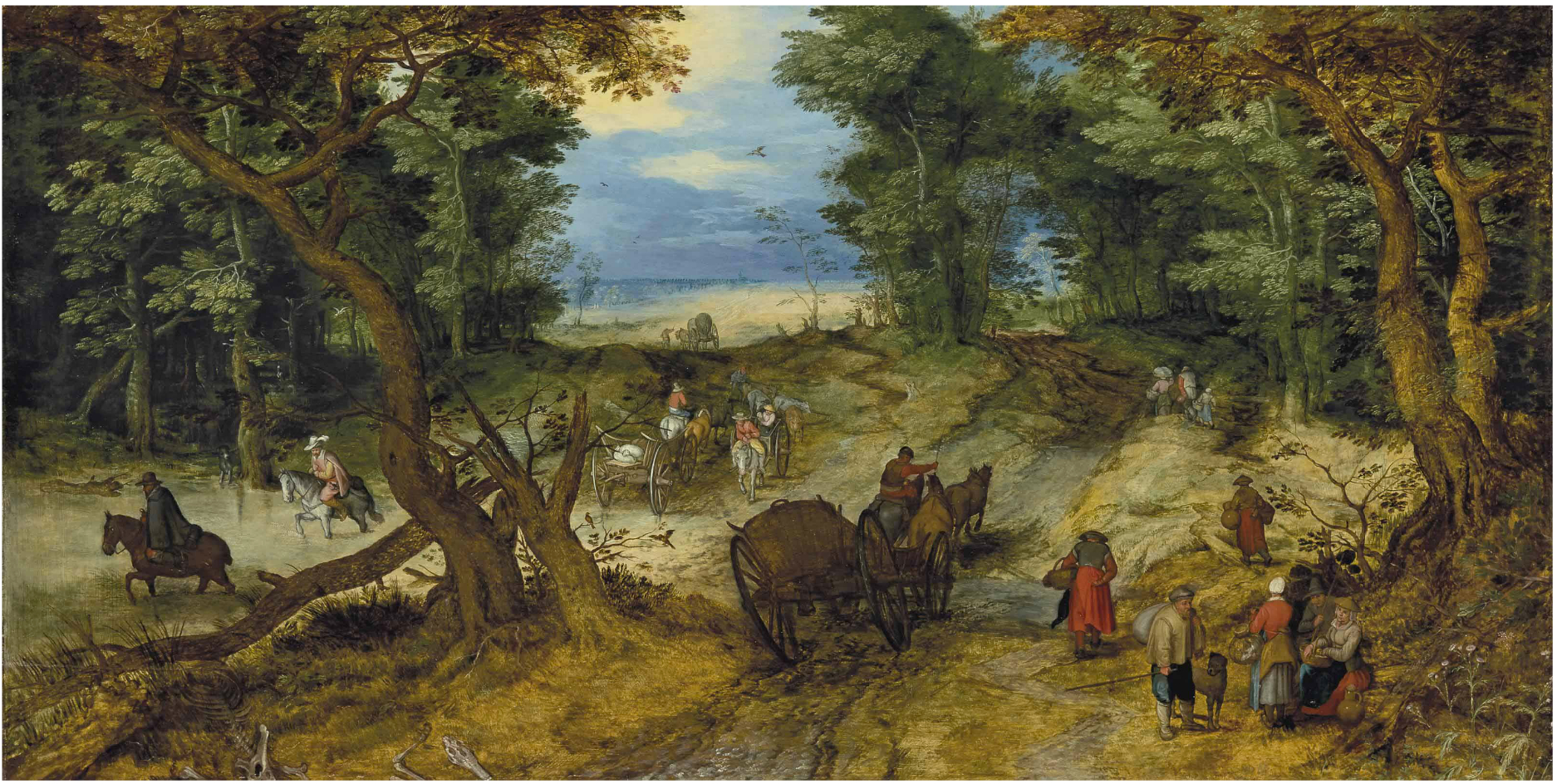
A wooded landscape with travellers on a path

Jan Brueghel's father, Pieter Bruegel the Elder, is regarded as an important innovator of landscape art. By introducing greater naturalism in his Alpine mountain settings, his father had expanded on the world landscape tradition that had been founded mainly by Joachim Patinir. Some of Pieter the Elder's works also foreshadowed the forest landscape that would start to dominate landscape painting around the turn of the 16th century. Pieter the Elder also developed the village and rural landscape, placing Flemish hamlets and farms in exotic prospects of mountains and river valleys.

Jan developed on the formula he learned from his father of arranging country figures travelling a road, which recedes into the distance. He emphasised the recession into space by carefully diminishing the scale of figures in the foreground, middle-ground, and far distance. To further the sense of atmospheric perspective, he used varying tones of brown, green, and blue progressively to characterise the recession of space. His landscapes with their vast depth are balanced through his attention to the peasant figures and their humble activities in the foreground.

Like his father, Jan Brueghel also painted various village landscapes. He used the surrounding landscapes as the stage for the crowds of anecdotal, colourfully dressed peasants who engage in various activities in the market, the country roads and during the rowdy kermesses. Jan Brueghel's landscape paintings with their strong narrative elements and attention to detail had a significant influence on Flemish and Dutch landscape artists in the second decade of the 17th century. His river views were certainly known to painters working in Haarlem, including Esaias van de Velde and Willem Buytewech, whom Brueghel may have met there when he accompanied Peter Paul Rubens on a diplomatic mission to the Dutch Republic in 1613.

Jan Brueghel was along with artists such as Gillis van Coninxloo one of the prime developers of the dense forest landscape in the 17th century. Jan Breughel experimented with such works before Coninxloo's first dated wooded landscape of 1598. In his forest landscapes Brueghel depicted heavily wooded glades in which he captured the verdant density, and even mystery, of the forest. Although on occasion inhabited by humans and animals, these forest scenes contain dark recesses, virtually no open sky and no outlet for the eye to penetrate beyond the thick trees.

=== Paradise landscapes ===
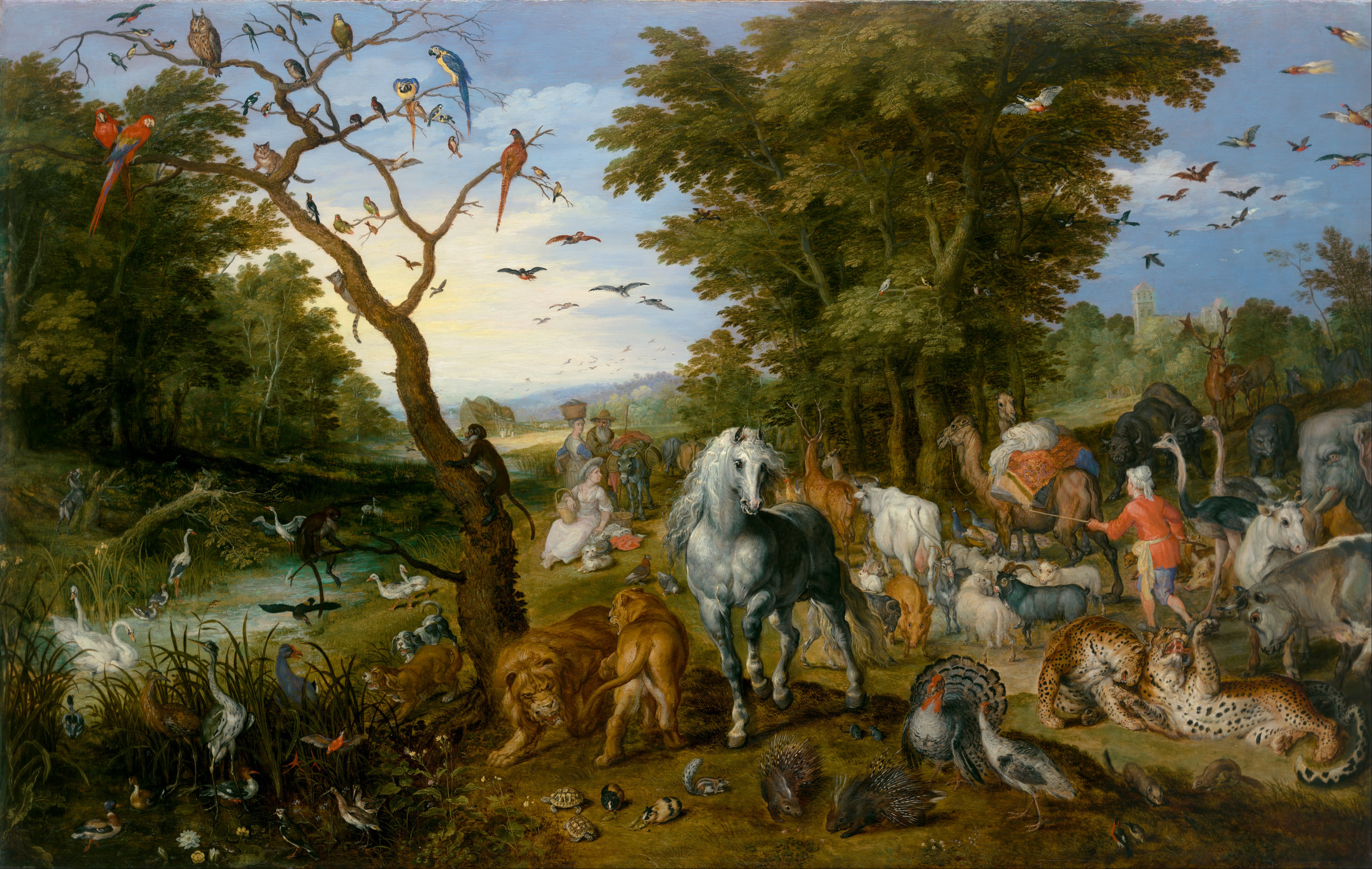
The entry of the animals into Noah's ark

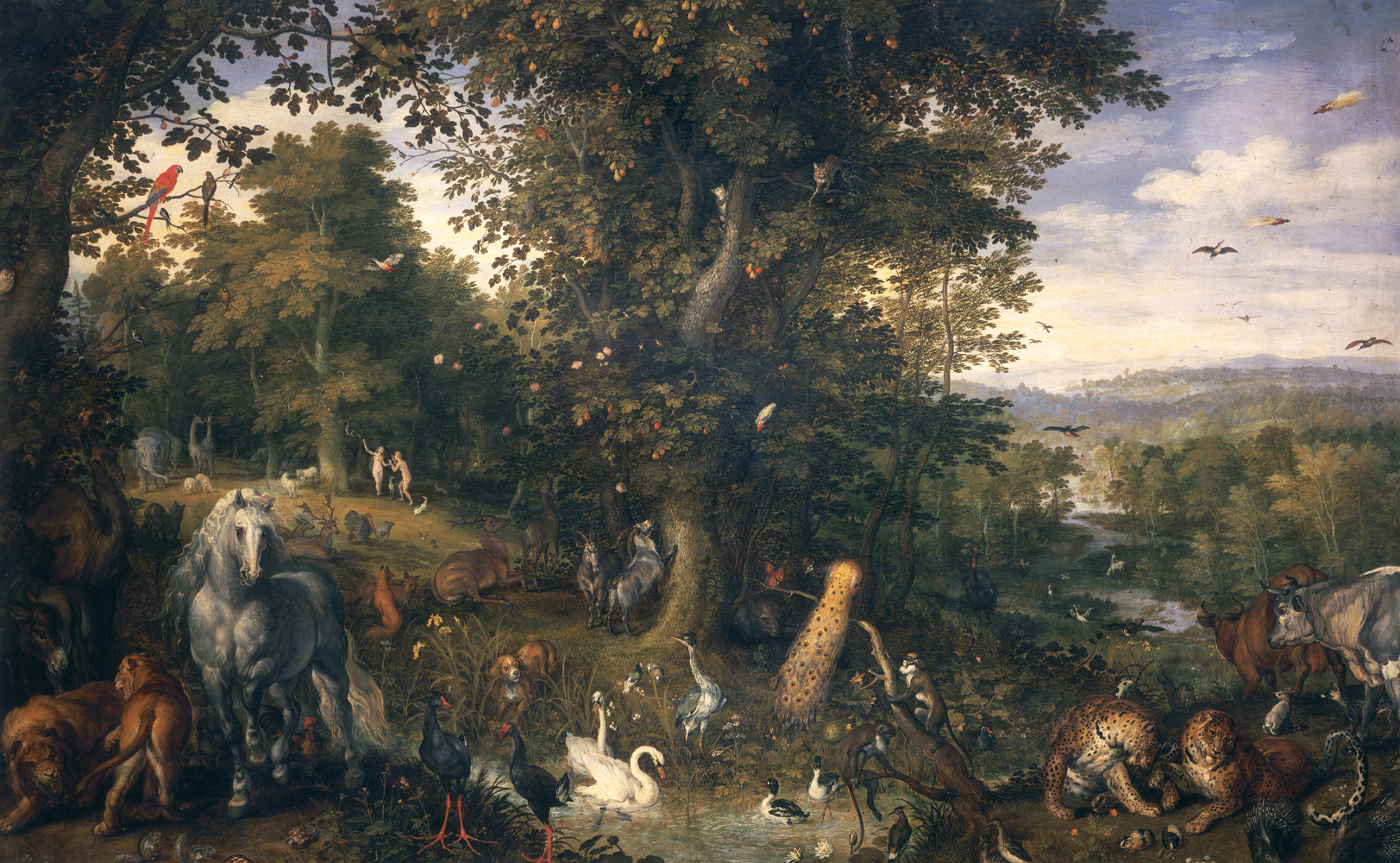
The Garden of Eden with the Fall of Man (1615)

Jan Brueghel invented the 'paradise landscape', a subgenre that involved a combination of landscape and animal painting. Works in this genre are typically crawling with numerous animals from exotic and native European species who coexist harmoniously in a lush landscape setting. These landscapes are inspired by episodes from Genesis, the chapter of the bible, which tells the story of the creation of the world and of man. The favourite themes taken from Genesis where the creation of man, Adam and Eve in paradise, the fall of man and the entry of the animals in Noah's ark.

Like his flower pieces, these landscapes were informed by the Catholic Counter-Reformation's worldview, which regarded earth and its inhabitants as revelations of their god and valued artistic representation of, and scientific investigation into, that divine revelation. As described above, Breughel's friend and patron, the Counter-Reformation Cardinal Federico Borromeo, had particularly emphasised the beauty and diversity of the animal world. Brueghel tried to render this worldview in his paradise landscapes. The novelty of Brueghel's paradise landscapes lies not only in the impressive variety of animals, which the artist studied mainly from life but also in their presentation as both figures of a religious narrative and as subjects of a scientific order.

Brueghel developed his earliest paradise landscapes during his stay in Venice in the early 1590s. His first paradise landscape known as The Garden of Eden with the Fall of Man is now in the Doria Pamphilj Gallery in Rome. The reference to Genesis in the picture appears in a small vignette representing the creation of Man in the background, but the main focus is on the animals and the landscape itself. This work was the first paradise landscape in which Brueghel 'catalogued' animals and depicts common and domesticated types. Brueghel's interest in the cataloguing of animals was stimulated by his visit to the court of Rudolf II, Holy Roman Emperor in Prague. The emperor had established an encyclopaedic collection of rarities and animals. While in his early paradise landscapes Brueghel seems to have based some of his renderings of the animals on works by other artists, he later could rely on studies from life of the various species in the menagerie of the court in Brussels. Brueghel had also seen Albrecht Dürer's depiction of animals during his visit to Prague and had made a painted copy of Dürer's watercolour The Madonna with a Multitude of Animals (1503). Dürer's representations of animals play a pivotal role in Renaissance zoology, since they are the purest artistic form of nature study. The studies of animals by Flemish artists Hans Bol and Joris Hoefnagel also had an important influence on Brueghel. In particular Hoefnagel's Four Elements (1575–1582) was the first artistic work to categorise animals in a book format. Hoefnagel's approach to the representation of the animal world combined natural historical, classical, emblematic, and biblical references, which incorporated the various species into the categories of the four elements of the cosmos: earth, water, air, and fire. Brueghel's paradise landscapes also embodied the encyclopaedic attitudes of his time by depicting a wide variety of species.

Brueghel continued refining his treatment of the subject of paradise landscapes throughout his career. The many renderings and variations of the paradise landscape produced by Brueghel earned him the nickname Paradise Brueghel.

=== Allegorical paintings ===
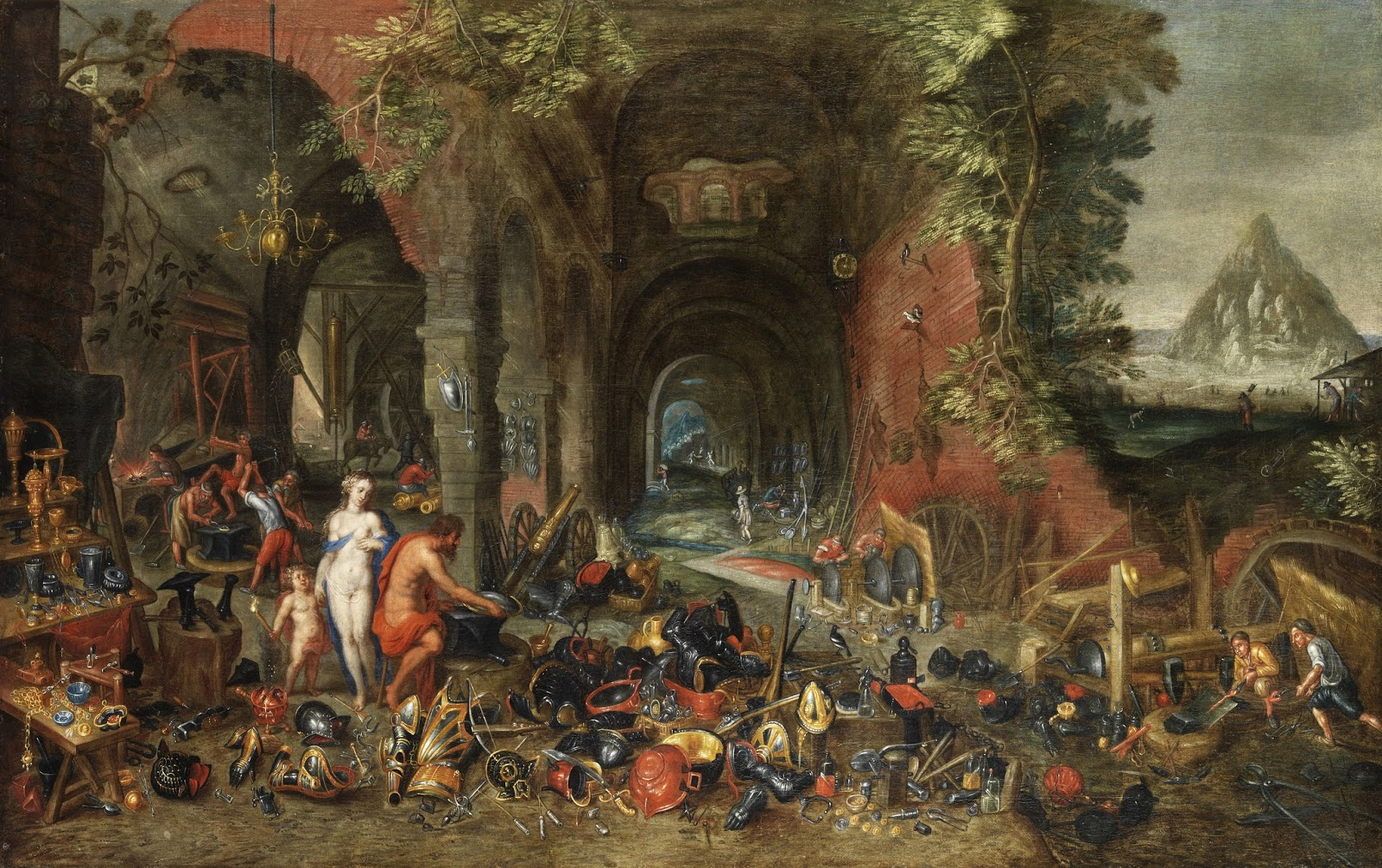
Allegory of Fire: Venus in the Forge of Vulcan

Jan Brueghel the Elder produced various sets of allegorical paintings, in particular on the themes of the Five senses and the Four Elements. These paintings were often collaborations with other painters such as is the case with the five paintings representing the Five senses on which Brueghel and Rubens collaborated and which are now in the Prado Museum in Madrid. He also collaborated with Hendrick van Balen on various allegorical compositions such as a series on the Four Elements as well as an Allegory of Public Welfare (Museum of Fine Arts Budapest).

In his allegories Jan Breughel illustrated an abstract concept, such as one of the senses or one of the four elements through a multitude of concrete objects that can be associated with it. He thus represented a concept by means of descriptive tropes. Brueghel resorted in these allegorical compositions to the encyclopaedic imagery that he also displayed in his paradise landscapes. This is demonstrated in his composition Allegory of Fire; Venus in the Forge of Vulcan of which there are various versions of which one (Doria Pamphilj Gallery) is a collaboration with Hendrick van Balen and another (Pinacoteca Ambrosiana) is attributed to Jan Brueghel alone. Brueghel's encyclopaedic approach in this composition offers such detail that historians of science have relied on the composition as a source of information on the types of tools used in 17th-century metallurgical practice.

=== Scenes of hell and demons ===
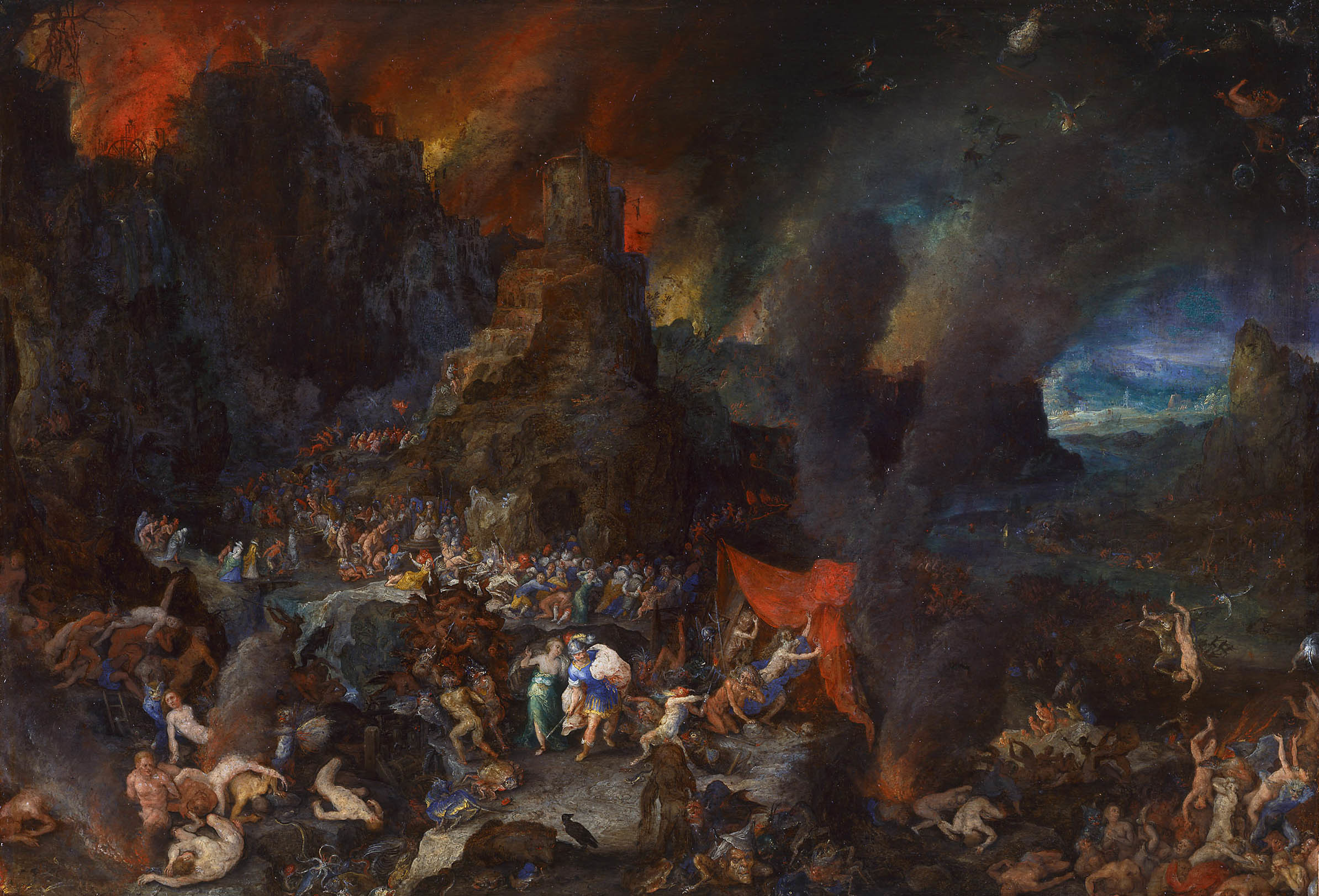
Aeneas and the Sibyl in the Underworld

Jan was early on nicknamed 'Hell Brueghel' but by the 19th century that name had become erroneously associated with his brother Pieter the Younger. Jan Brueghel was given the nickname because of his scenes with demons and hell scenes. An example is the Temptation of St. Anthony (Kunsthistorisches Museum), which reprises a subject first explored by Hieronymus Bosch. In this demon-plagued scene the monsters are seen attacking the small saint in the corner of a large and dense forest landscape, rather than within the expanded panoramas of Patinir.

Jan Brueghel is believed to have produced his hell scenes for a newer, elite audience of learned and sophisticated collectors. To appeal to this erudite clientele he often populated the hell scenes with mythological rather than religious subjects, in particular the Vergilian scene of Aeneas in Hades, escorted by the Cumaean Sibyl. An example is Aeneas and the Sibyl in the Underworld (1619, Kunsthistorisches Museum). Other mythological themes appearing in his hell scenes included the image of Juno visiting Hades and Orpheus in the Underworld from Ovid's Metamorphoses. An example of the latter is Orpheus in the Underworld (Palazzo Pitti). In these compositions brightly coloured monsters provide the 'recreational terror' of the later manifestations of Boschian design.

Brueghel's hell scenes were influential and Jacob van Swanenburg, one of Rembrandt's teachers, was inspired by them to create his own hell scenes.

=== Gallery paintings ===
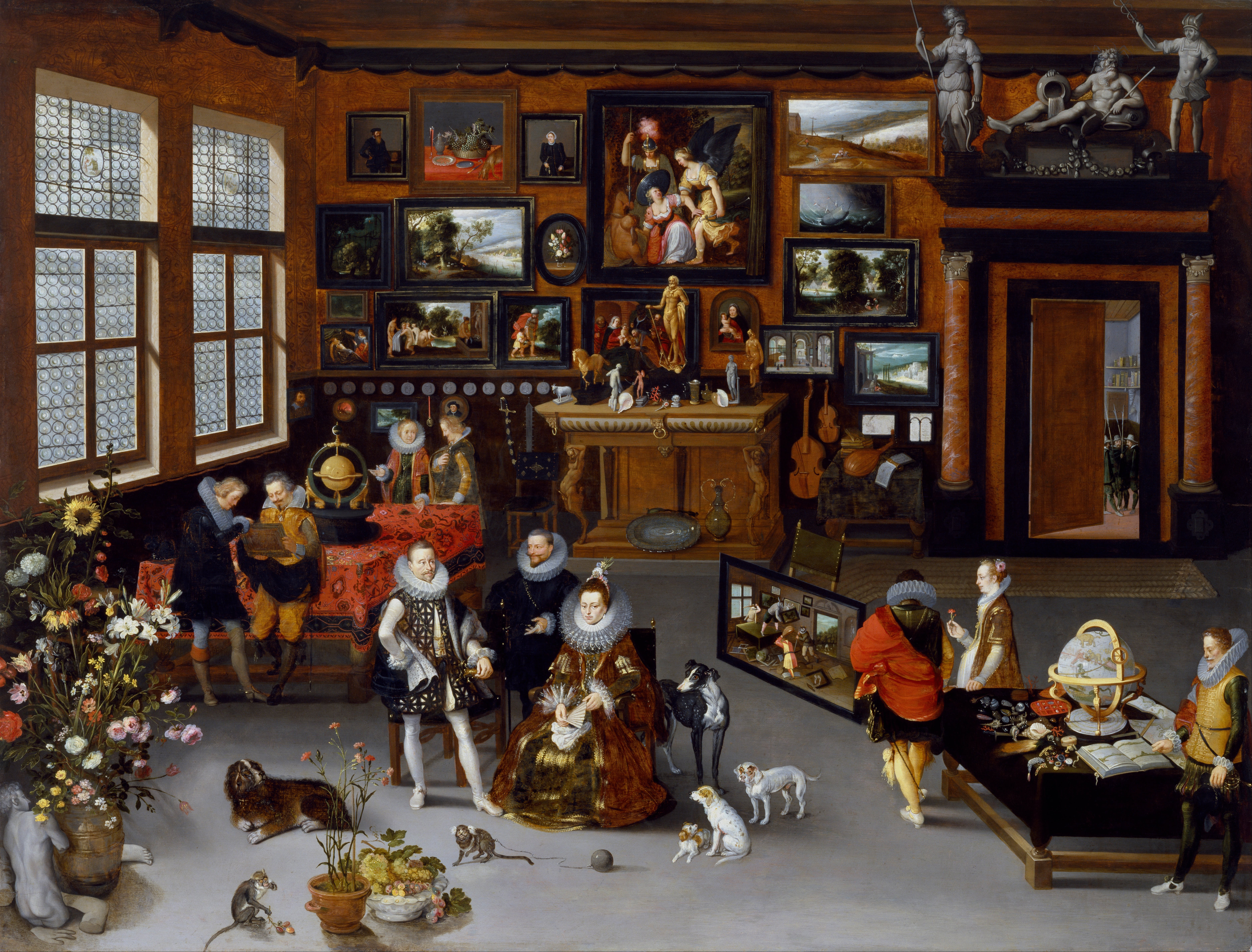
The Archdukes Albert and Isabella Visiting the Collection of Pieter Roose

Jan Brueghel the Elder and Frans Francken the Younger were the first artists to create paintings of art and curiosity collections in the 1620s. Gallery paintings depict large rooms in which many paintings and other precious items are displayed in elegant surroundings. These rooms were often referred to as Kunstkammern ("art rooms") or Wunderkammern ("wonder rooms"). The earliest works in this genre depicted art objects together with other items such as scientific instruments or peculiar natural specimens. Some gallery paintings include portraits of the owners or collectors of the art objects or artists at work. The paintings are heavy with symbolism and allegory and are a reflection of the intellectual preoccupations of the age, including the cultivation of personal virtue and the importance of connoisseurship. The genre became immediately quite popular and was followed by other artists such as Jan Brueghel the Younger, Cornelis de Baellieur, Hans Jordaens, David Teniers the Younger, Gillis van Tilborch and Hieronymus Janssens.

A famous example of a gallery painting by Jan Brueghel is The Archdukes Albert and Isabella Visiting a Collector's Cabinet (now referred to as The Archdukes Albert and Isabella Visiting the Collection of Pieter Roose) (c. 1621–1623, Walters Art Museum). The work is believed to be a collaboration between Jan Brueghel the Elder and Hieronymus Francken II. This gallery painting represents the early phase of the genre of collector's cabinets. During this early 'encyclopaedic' phase, the genre reflected the culture of curiosity of that time, when art works, scientific instruments, naturalia and arteficialia were equally the object of study and admiration. As a result, the cabinets depicted in these compositions are populated by persons who appear to be as interested in discussing scientific instruments as in admiring paintings. Later the genre concentrated more on galleries solely containing works of art. The compositions depicted in The Archdukes Albert and Isabella Visiting a Collector's Cabinet are predominantly allegories of iconoclasm and the victory of painting (art) over ignorance. They are references to the iconoclasm of the Beeldenstorm that had raged in the Low Countries in the 16th century and the victory over the iconoclasts during the reign of the Archdukes Albert and Isabella who jointly ruled the Spanish Netherlands in the beginning of the 17th century. Jan Brueghel was responsible for the large vase of flowers, which is crowned by a large sunflower. This South American flower, which could grow very tall and would turn towards the sun, was first seen by Europeans in the mid-16th century. It had been illustrated as a New World wonder in botanical treatises, but Jan Brueghel was the first to include the flower in a painting and use it as a symbol of princely patronage in this composition. By turning toward Albert and Isabella (taking the position of the sun), the sunflower symbolises the way that the arts were able to grow and blossom in the light and warmth of princely patronage.

=== Singeries ===
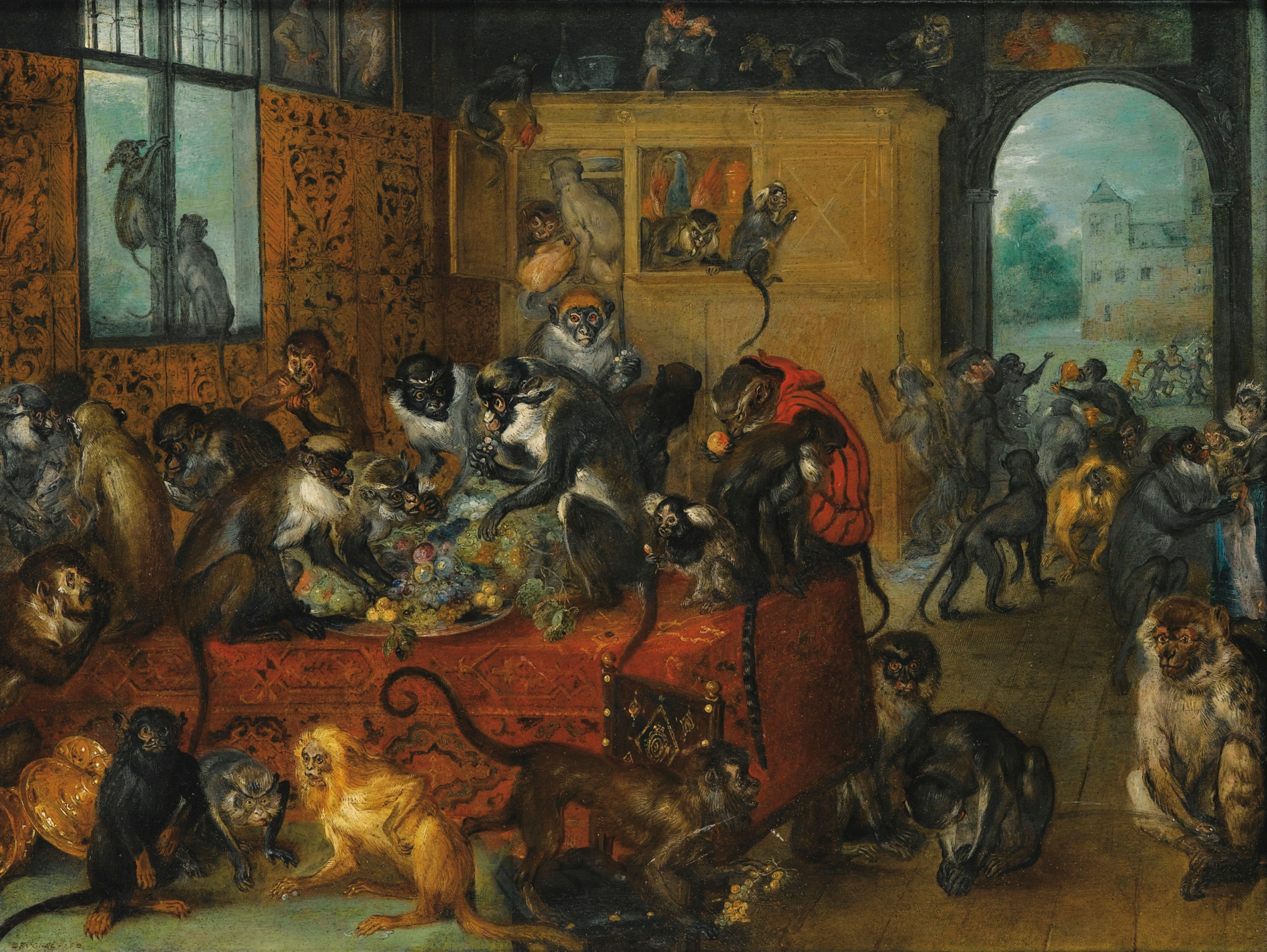
Monkeys feasting

Breughel contributed to the development of the genre of the 'monkey scene', also called 'singerie' (a word derived from the French for 'monkey' and meaning a 'comical grimace, behaviour or trick'). Comical scenes with monkeys appearing in human attire and a human environment are a pictorial genre that was initiated in Flemish painting in the 16th century and was further developed in the 17th century. Monkeys were regarded as shameless and impish creatures and excellent imitators of human behaviour. These depictions of monkeys enacting various human roles were a playful metaphor for all the folly in the world.

The Flemish engraver Pieter van der Borcht introduced the singerie as an independent theme around 1575 in a series of prints, which were strongly embedded in the artistic tradition of Pieter Bruegel the Elder. These prints were widely disseminated and the theme was then picked up by other Flemish artists. The first one to do so was the Antwerp artist Frans Francken the Younger, who was quickly followed by Jan Brueghel the Elder, the Younger, Sebastiaen Vrancx and Jan van Kessel the Elder. Jan Brueghel the Elder's son-in-law David Teniers the Younger became the principal practitioner of the genre and developed it further with his younger brother Abraham Teniers. Later in the 17th century Nicolaes van Verendael started to paint these 'monkey scenes' as well.

An example of a singerie by Jan Brueghel is the Monkeys feasting, which dates from his early years as an artist (private collection, on long-term loan to the Rubenshuis, Antwerp). This painting on copper was probably one of the first examples of a singerie painting. Jan Brueghel likely drew his monkeys in the zoo of the Archdukes in Brussels. While the composition shows the monkeys engaged in all kinds of mischief, it includes a painting above the door jamb, which is a work from Rubens' studio, called "Ceres and Pan". The representation of Ceres and Pan provides a contrast between the cultivated versus the wild world of the monkeys below.

== Sources ==
- Leopoldine van Hogendorp Prosperetti, 'Landscape and Philosophy in the Art of Jan Brueghel the Elder (1568–1625)', Ashgate Publishing, Ltd., 2009
- Arianne Faber Kolb, Jan Brueghel the Elder: The Entry of the Animals into Noah’s Ark, Getty Publications, 2005
- Larry Silver, Peasant Scenes and Landscapes: The Rise of Pictorial Genres in the Antwerp Art Market, University of Pennsylvania Press, 4 January 2012
- Anne T. Woollett and Ariane van Suchtelen; with contributions by Tiarna Doherty, Mark Leonard, and Jørgen Wadum, Rubens and Brueghel: A Working Friendship, 2006

Brueghel family tree

Pieter Bruegel the Elder
Pieter Brueghel the Younger	Jan Brueghel the Elder
Ambrosius Brueghel	Jan Brueghel the Younger	Anna Brueghel x David Teniers the Younger	Paschasia Brueghel	Hieronymous van Kessel the Younger
Jan Pieter Brueghel	Abraham Brueghel	Jan Baptist Brueghel	Jan van Kessel the Elder
