= Frederik Bouttats =

Frederik Bouttats may refer to:

- Frederik Bouttats the Elder (1590–1661), Flemish engraver
- Frederik Bouttats the Younger (1620–1676), Flemish engraver
