= Monk's Hermitage in a Cave =

Painting by Joos de Momper

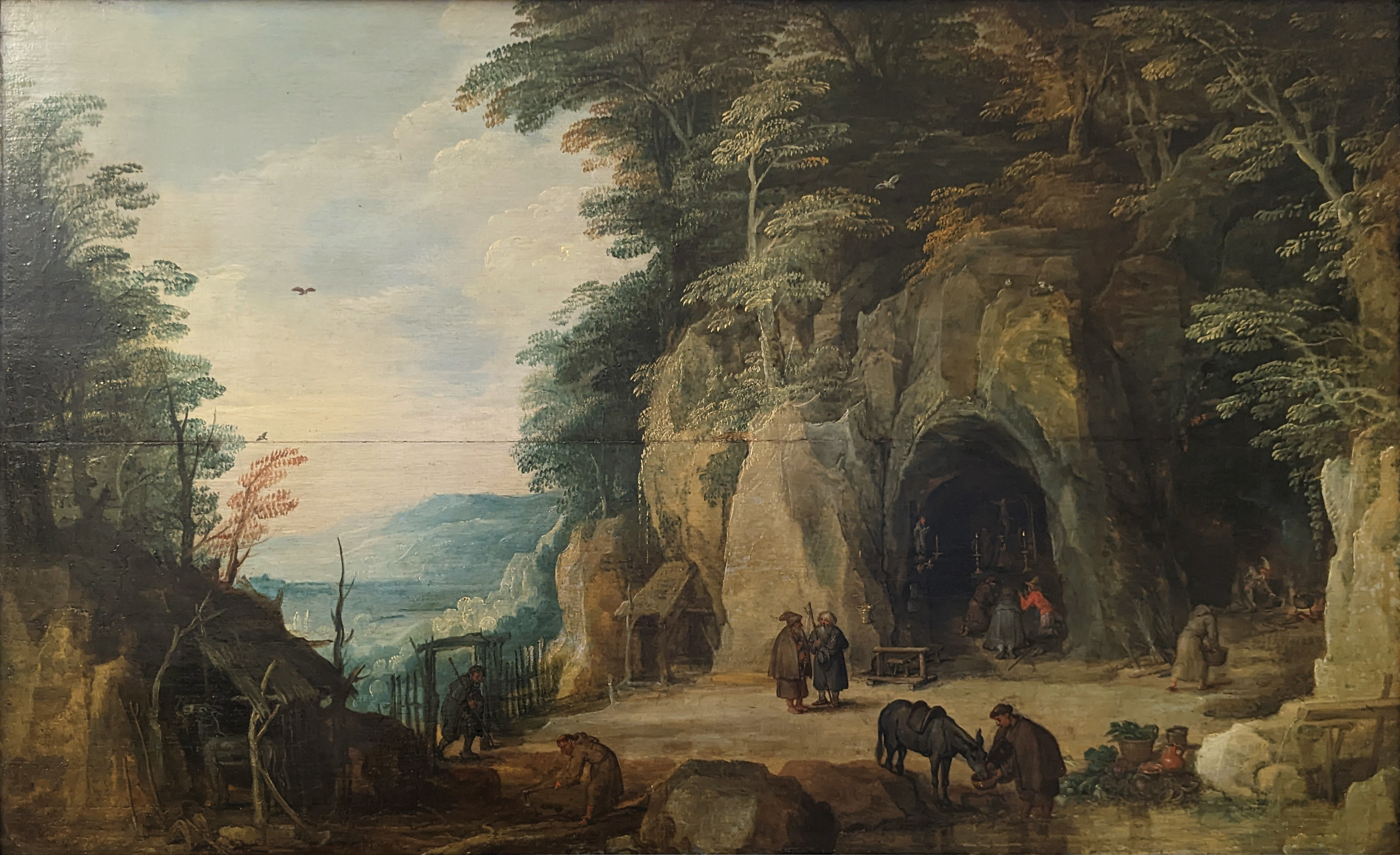
- Artist: Joos de Momper
- Year: 1579–1635
- Catalogue: INV 1116
- Medium: Oil on panel
- Dimensions: 46 cm × 75 cm (18.1 in × 29.5 in)
- Location: Louvre, Paris

Monk's Hermitage in a Cave (French: Ermitage de moines dans une grotte) is an oil painting on panel by the Flemish painter Joos de Momper. Its date of execution is unknown. The painting was once attributed to Paul Bril. It is part of the permanent collection of the Louvre in Paris.

== Painting ==
The painting depicts a frequent theme in 16th- and 17th-century Flemish painting, explored by Cornelis van Dalem, Pieter Bruegel the Elder, and Lucas van Valckenborch.

The work was acquired by the French state from the monarchy. It was part of the collection of Louis XIV, who had acquired it from Eberhard Jabach in 1671. The painting was attributed to Paul Bril in 1824, but is now considered to be the work of de Momper.
