= Crypto-Protestantism =

Protestants pretending to accept Catholicism

Crypto-Protestantism is a historical phenomenon that first arose on the territory of the Habsburg Empire, and in France after the Edict of Fontainebleau in 1685 until the Edict of Versailles issued by Louis XVI in 1787, but also elsewhere in Europe and Spanish America, at a time when Catholic rulers tried, after the Protestant Reformation, to reestablish Catholicism in parts of the Empire that had become Protestant after the Reformation. The Protestants in these areas strove to retain their own confession inwardly while they outwardly pretended to accept Catholicism. With the Patent of Toleration in the Habsburg Empire in 1781, Protestantism was again permitted, and from that time on most Protestants could live their faith openly once more.

== See also ==
- Nicodemite
- Crypto-Papism
- Crypto-Christianity
- Crypto-Calvinism
- Persecution of Huguenots under Louis XV
- Protestantenpatent of Franz Joseph I. (1861)
- Hundskirke stone
- Cafeteria Catholicism
- Cum ex apostolatus officio
- Molinism
- Jansenism (sometimes labeled as Crypto-Calvinism)
- Jan van Wechelen § Church interior with Christ preaching to a crowd
- Salzburg Protestants
- Transylvanian Landler
- Zillertal Valley expulsion
