= Grotto Landscape with a Hermitage =

Painting by Joos de Momper

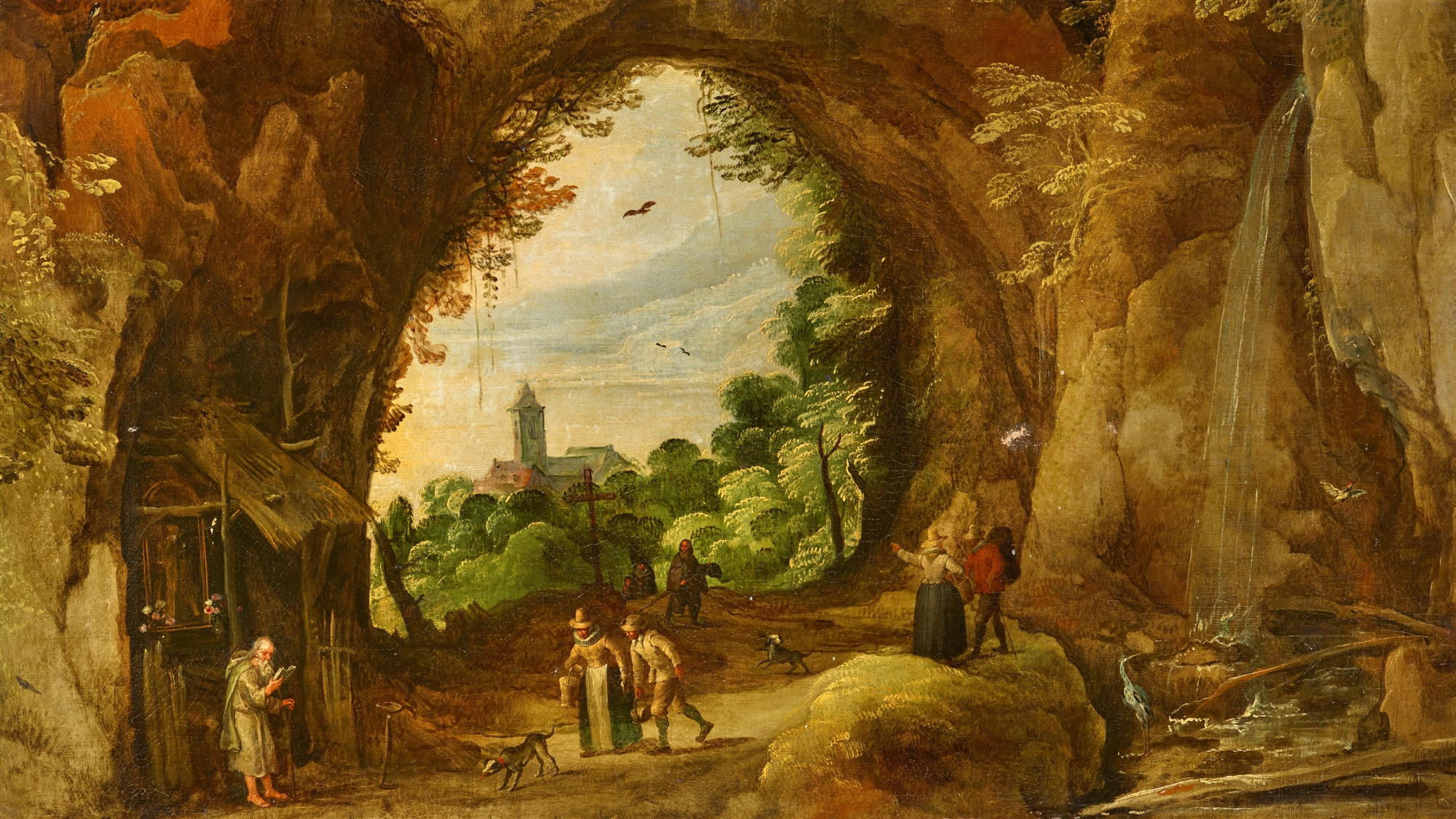
- Artist: Joos de Momper, Jan Brueghel the Younger
- Year: ca. 1625
- Medium: Oil on panel
- Dimensions: 56 cm × 99 cm (22 in × 39 in)
- Location: Private collection, Berlin

Grotto Landscape with a Hermitage, also called The Reading Hermit, is an oil on canvas painting by Flemish painters Jan Brueghel the Younger and Joos de Momper. It was painted around 1625, and is currently in private collection. It depicts a reading hermit in a monumental grotto, several pilgrims and various animals (dogs and birds). It was painted in Antwerp.

== Description ==
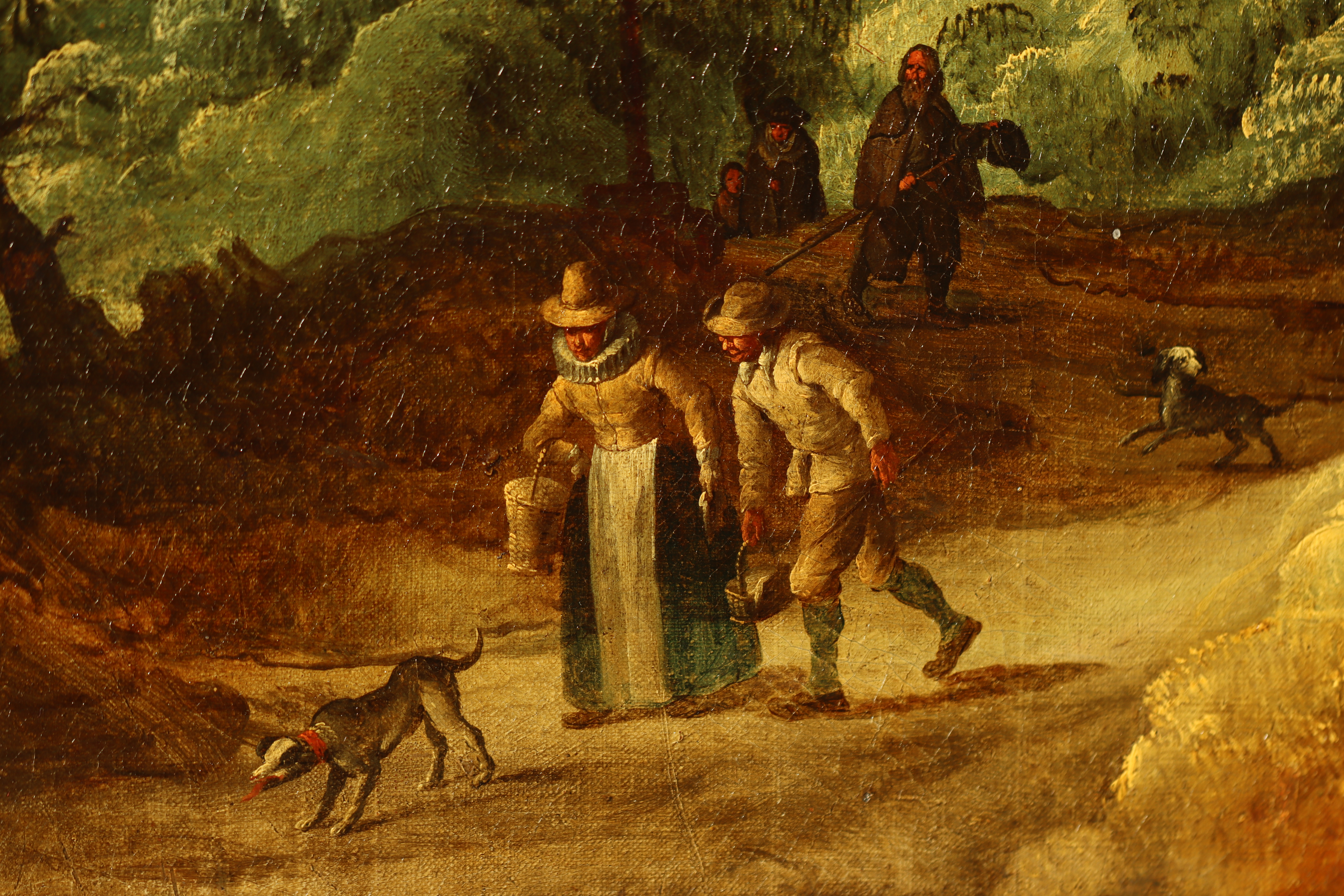
Pilgrims

=== Landscape ===
The landscape comes from Joos de Momper the Younger. It shows a mannerist color transition from brown in the foreground to green in the background. The main element of the painting is the grotto or cave, which divides the space into two levels. The fantastic rocky landscape is kept in brown, the world outside is mainly green.

=== Figures ===
The central figure in the grotto is the hermit, front left, who is absorbed in reading a book. Two well-dressed couples can be seen in the middle distance of the picture. Both couples have baskets of food with them. The figures seem less pilgrims than walkers.

=== Nature ===
The depictions of animals are striking: two dogs are running in the hermit's cave, one of them seems to be yapping at the hermit. The birds, possibly also painted by Jan Brughel, are located by the waterfall that defines the right part of the painting. There is thick forest between the grotto and the town church in the background.

== Topics ==
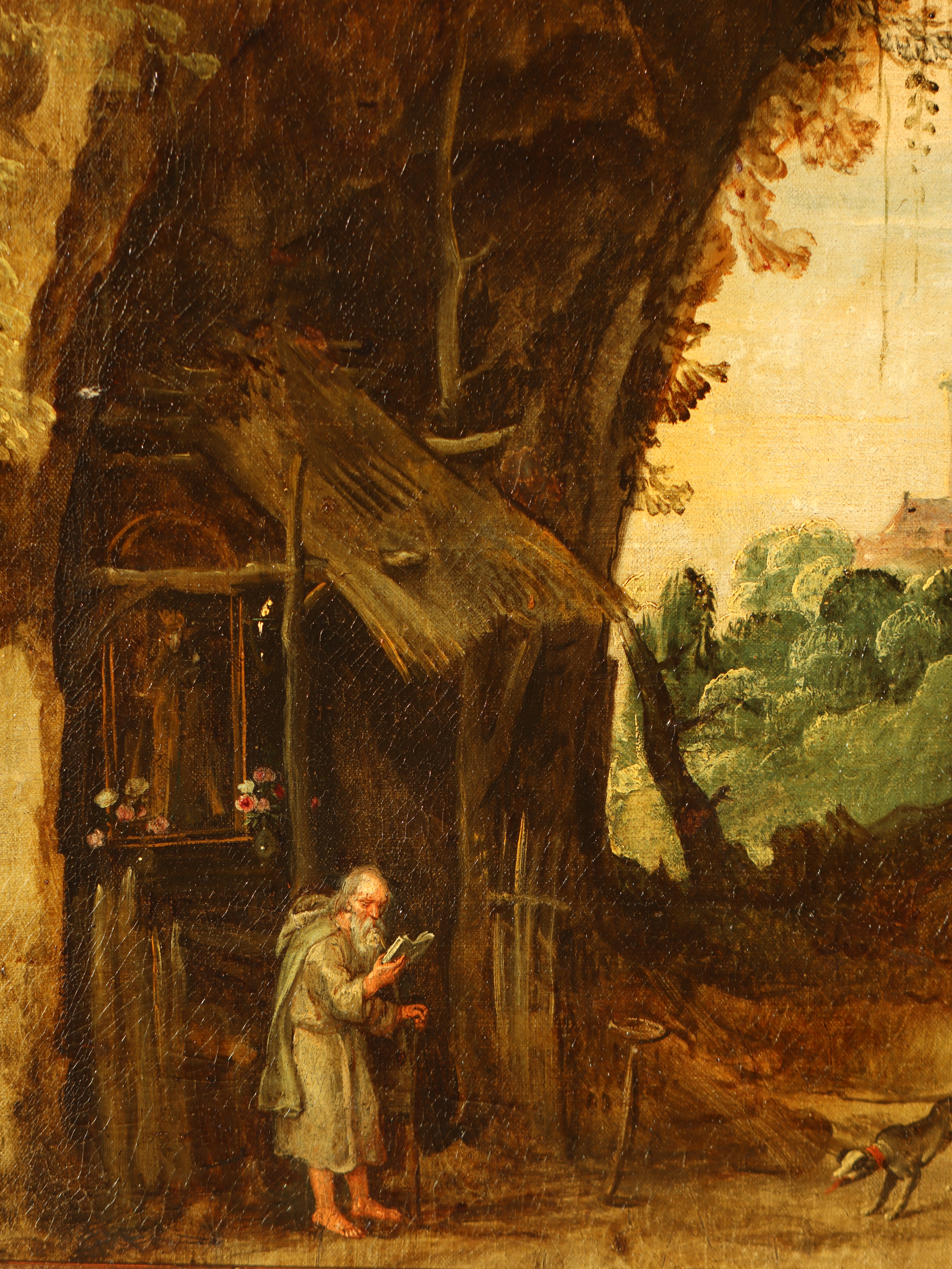
Hermit

Untouched nature is the dominant theme of the right half of the painting, religion occupies the left half of the picture. The hermit set up an altar with a painting of crowned Mary on it. The painting juxtaposes religion and nature as well as civilization on the one hand (church in the background, elegantly dressed walkers) and untouched nature (crane, waterfall) on the other.

== Cooperation between the painters ==
In Flemish painting of the late 16th and early 17th centuries there was often joint work by different painters. The painters specialized in a certain area, such as landscape or figures. The painting “Grotto landscape with hermitage” is an example of the collaboration: while Brughel painted the figures and animals, Joos de Momper the grotto and the landscape. This division of labor approach was quite common among painters at that time.

Joos de Momper the Younger (1564-1635) was a Flemish landscape painter. His landscape depictions show the transition from the Mannerist world landscape to the naturalistic Dutch landscape painting of the 17th century.

Jan Brueghel the Younger (1601–1678) was a Flemish landscape, flower and animal painter from the most important Flemish painting dynasty, the Brueghel family. He was the grandson of Pieter Bruegel the Elder and son of Jan Brueghel the Elder.

Both Joos de Momper and Jan Brueghel grew up in Antwerp and were members of the Guild of Saint Luke, a guild-like brotherhood of painters and printers. Both painters also came from important families of painters. Joos de Momper often worked with Jan Brueghel the Elder and Jan Brueghel the Younger.

== Grotto painting as a genre ==
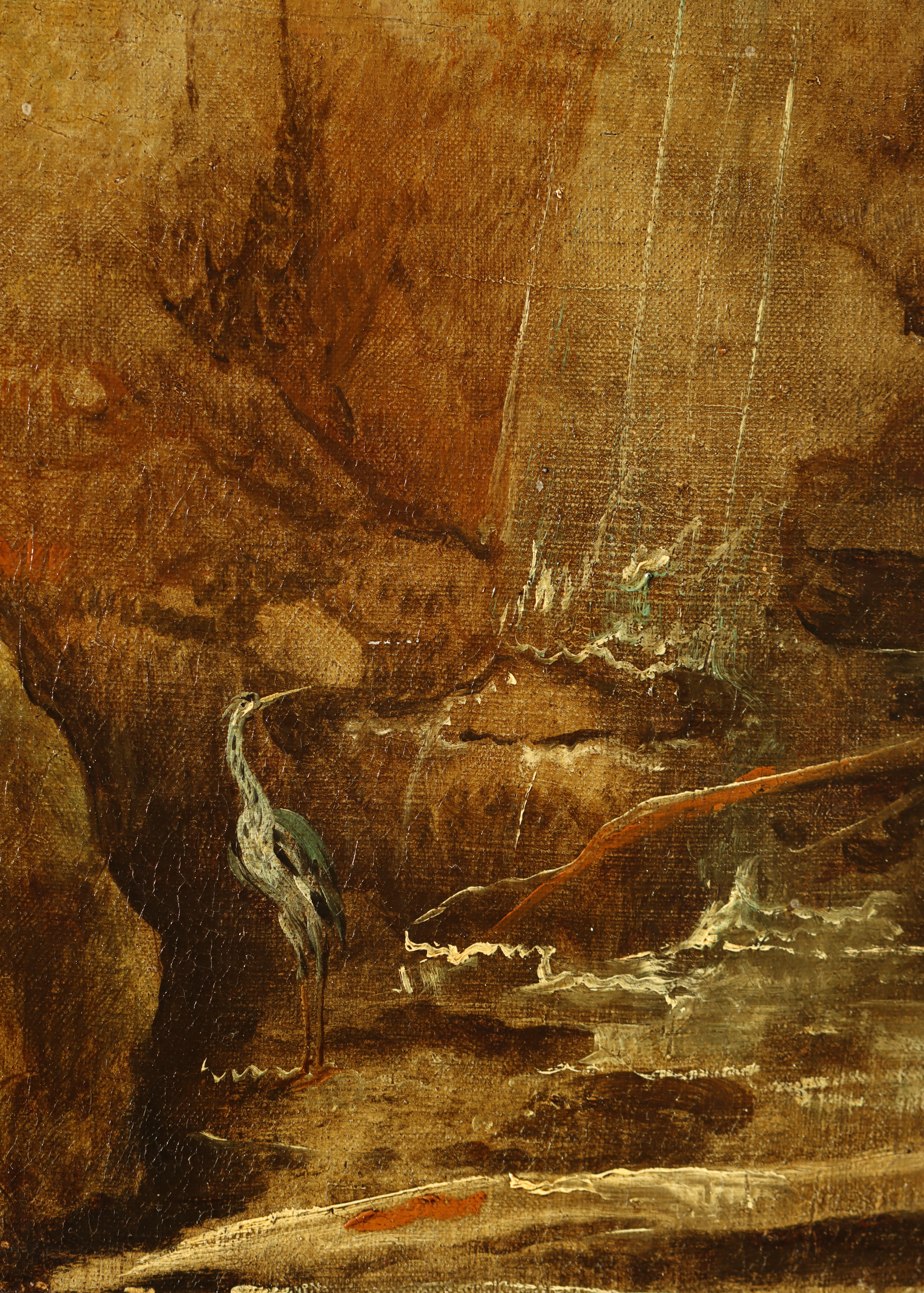
Crane with waterfall

De Momper is considered to be the most important exponent of grotto painting: These are paintings in which a rock grotto or cave is the focus of the painting. The caves are refuge for hermits, serve as a place of pilgrimage (as in this painting) or serve as the background of a mythological story. Further representatives of grotto painting are Cornelis van Dalem (approx. 1530–1573), Jan Brueghel the Elder (1568–1625) and Paul Bril (approx. 1553–1626). Another grotto landscape by Joos de Momper and Jan Brueghel the Elder is in the Liechtenstein Museum in Vienna, also here with a reading hermit.

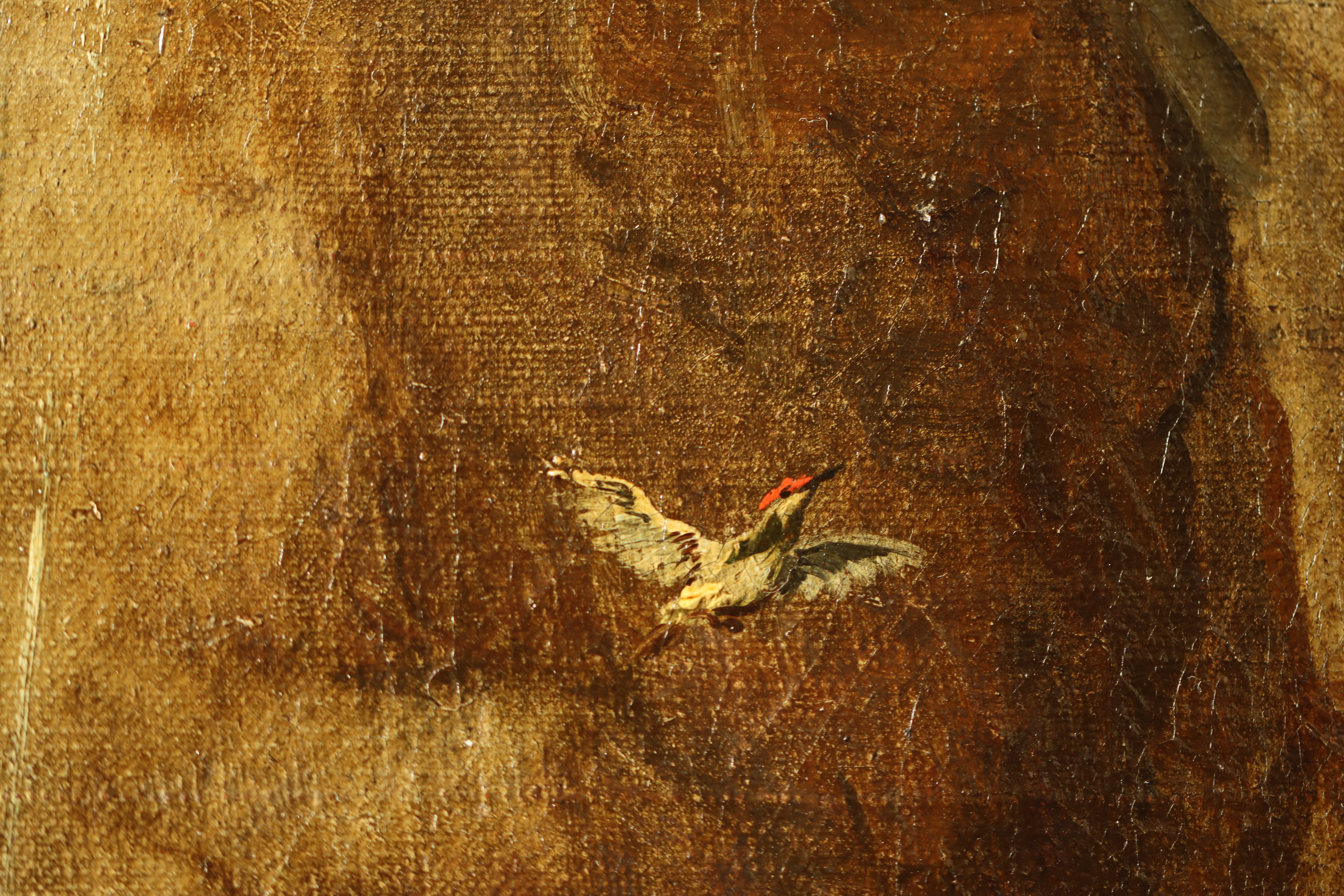
Bird

De Momper's name was so closely linked to rock and mountain landscapes that he was named Judocus de Momper Pictor montium Antwerpiae (Joos de Momper, Antwerp, Painter of mountains) in the then very well-known Iconography, a series of pictures by well-known painters after Anthony van Dyck.

== Bibliography ==
- Klaus Ertz: Josse de Momper der Jüngere, 1564–1635: Die Gemälde mit kritischem Œuvrekatalog. Freren: Luca, 1986.
- Klaus Ertz: Jan Breughel der Jüngere (1601–1678): Die Gemälde mit kritischem Œuvrekatalog. Freren: Luca, 1984.
