= Romeyn de Hooghe =

Dutch painter

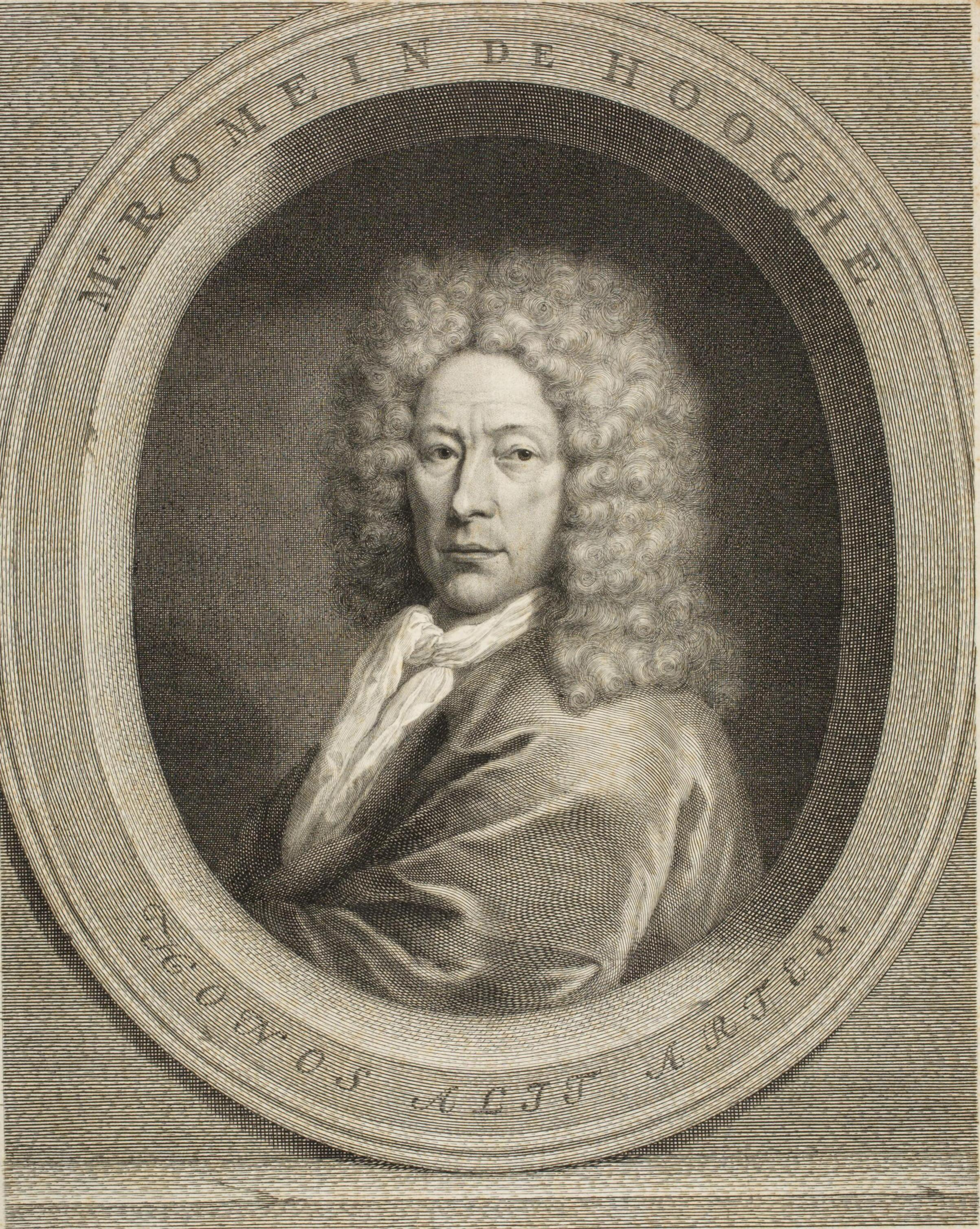
- Romeyn de Hooghe (1659), Portrait engraving by Jacob Houbraken from a portrait by Henricus Bos. Inscribed along the oval frame "Mr. ROMEIN DE HOOGHE. HONOS ALIT ARTES."
- Born: Romeyn de Hooghe; 10 September 1645 (baptised); Amsterdam, Netherlands
- Died: 15 July 1708 (buried); Haarlem, Netherlands
- Known for: Painting, printmaking, drawing

Romeyn de Hooghe (bapt. 10 September 1645 – 10 June 1708) was a late Dutch Baroque painter, sculptor, engraver and caricaturist.

== Biography ==
He was born in Amsterdam, and was a skilled etcher, draughtsman, painter, sculptor and medalist. He is best known for political caricatures of Louis XIV and propagandistic prints supporting William of Orange. He was also active as an erotic artist and some of his political propaganda prints can be considered early, prototypical comic strips.

During his career, de Hooghe produced over 3500 prints. He also illustrated books, and his illustrations can be found in some of the most important texts of his period. The Hieroglyphica of Merkbeelden der oude volkeren (1735) was a well-known emblem book and sourcebook for classical mythology and its iconography.

According to Houbraken he was particularly good at inventive arrangements of subjects in engravings. He was also a gifted painter and painted large panels for the rooms of the mayor's office in Enkhuizen and a room in the estate of Mattthijs van den Broeck in Dubbeldam. Houbraken disapproved of his dissolute lifestyle however, and felt that despite an enormous talent, as he grew older, he engraved shameful subjects that were a disgrace to the profession.

Contrary to this, the historian Simon Schama wrote in the aftermath of the Charlie Hebdo killings of 2015 that: "The first great modern graphic satirist was Romeyn de Hooghe, enlisted by William III at the end of the 17th century in his relentless war to the death with Louis XIV. De Hooghe obliged with sprawling cartoons representing the wars against the French monarch and his allies as a battle between liberty and religious despotism".

According to the RKD he became a member of the Confrerie Pictura in 1662 and again in 1683 in the Hague. He was engaged to Maria Lansman of Edam in 1673, and their child was baptized in the Nieuwezijds Kapel in Amsterdam in 1674. He is known for decorative borders on large-scale city maps. His pupils were Filibert Bouttats (1654-after 1731), Filibertus Bouttats (1635–1707), Frans Decker, François Harrewijn, Jacobus Harrewijn, Aernout Naghtegael, Laurens Scherm, and Adriaen Schoonebeek.

De Hooghe died in Haarlem, on 10 June 1708.

== Selected works ==
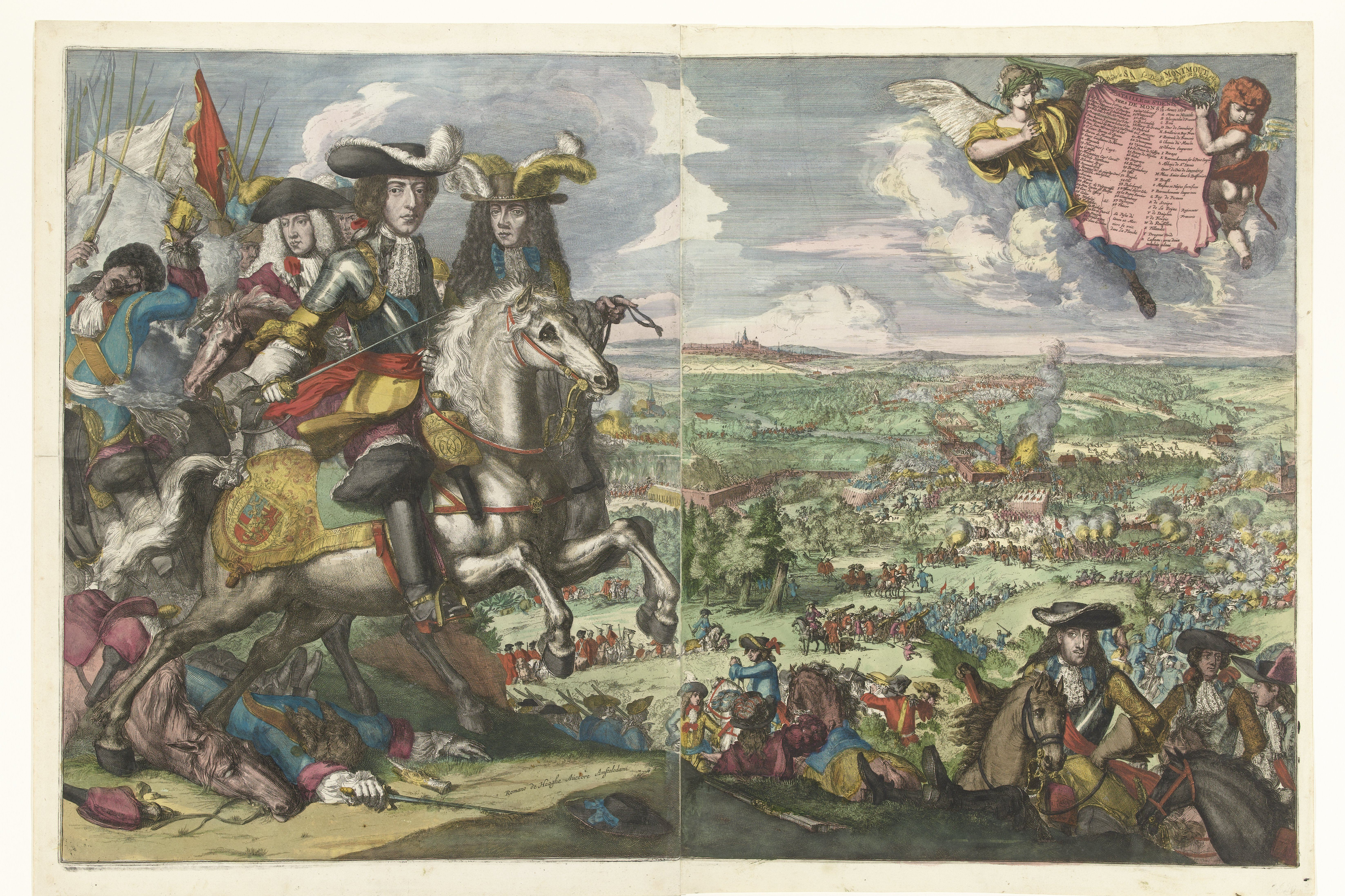
Depiction of the Battle of Saint George, created in 1678.

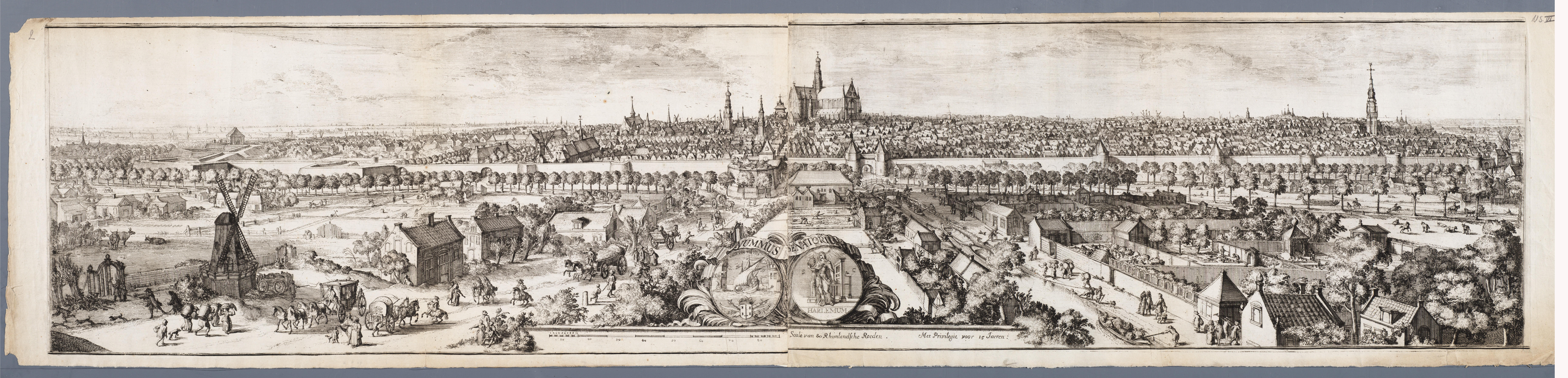
"Harlemum", dimensions: 27.9 x 125 cm, housed in the North Holland Archives.

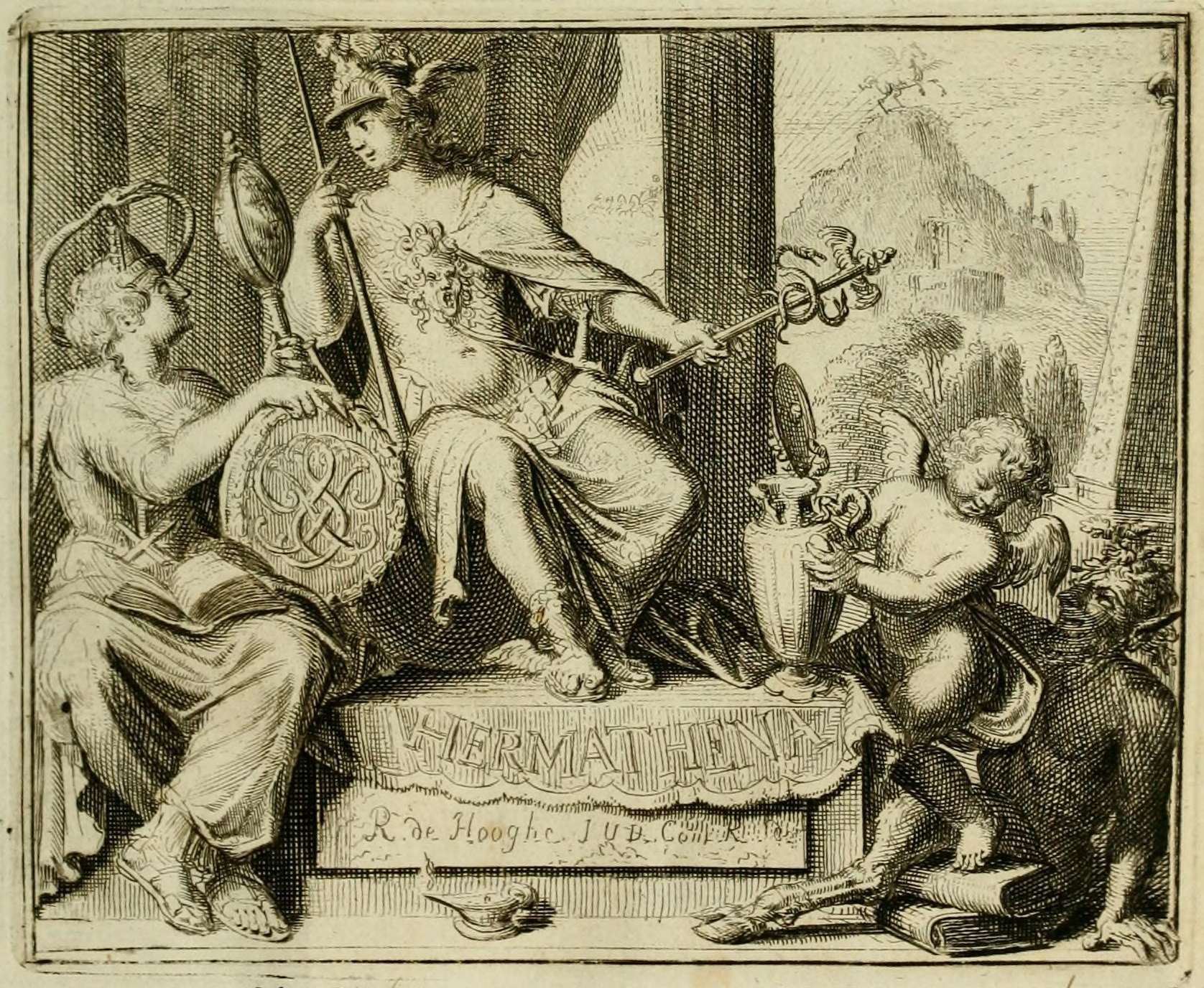
"History of the Churches and Heretics: From the Beginning of the New Testament Testaments until the year of our Lord 1688 (1701)"

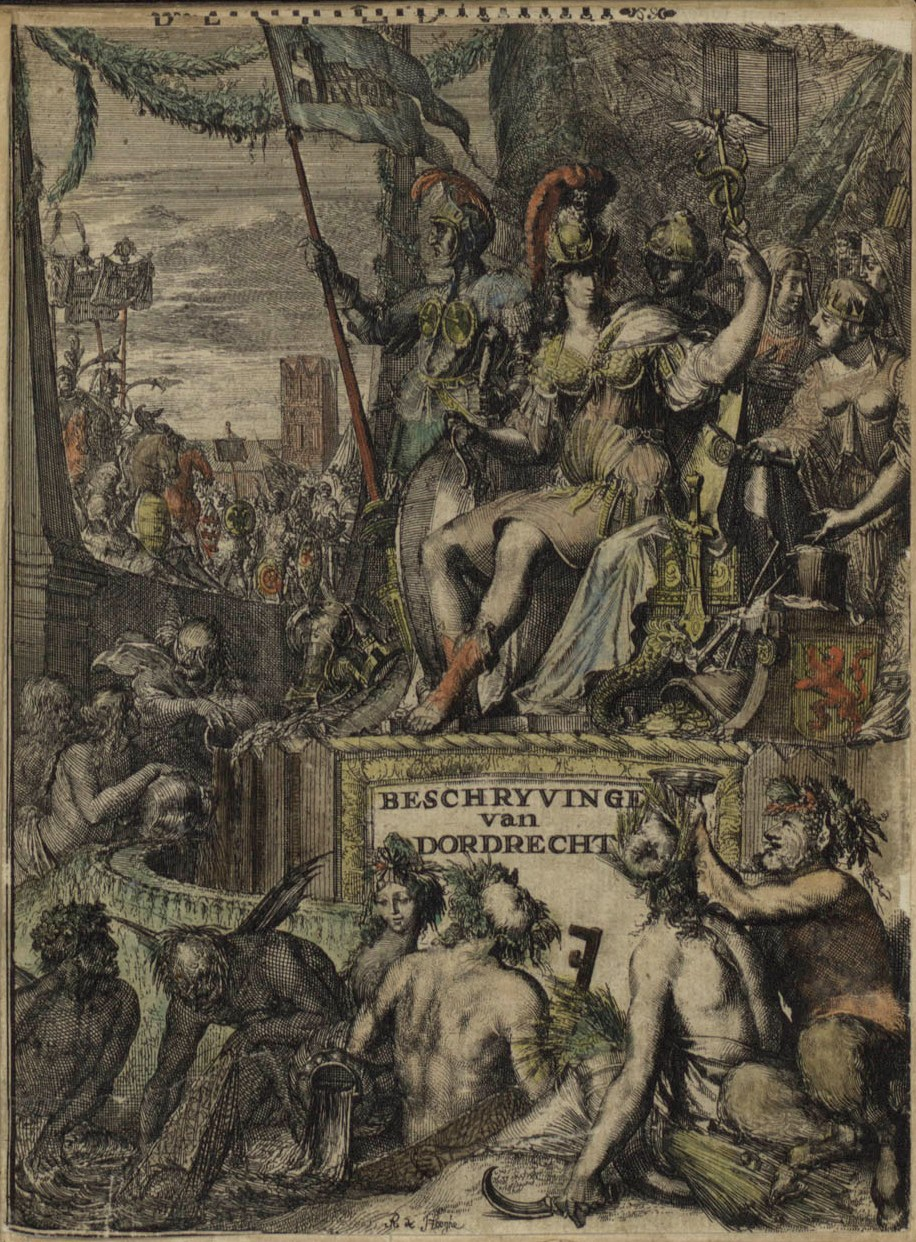
"Frontispiece of Mathias Balen's book Beschryvinge der stad Dordrecht", 1677

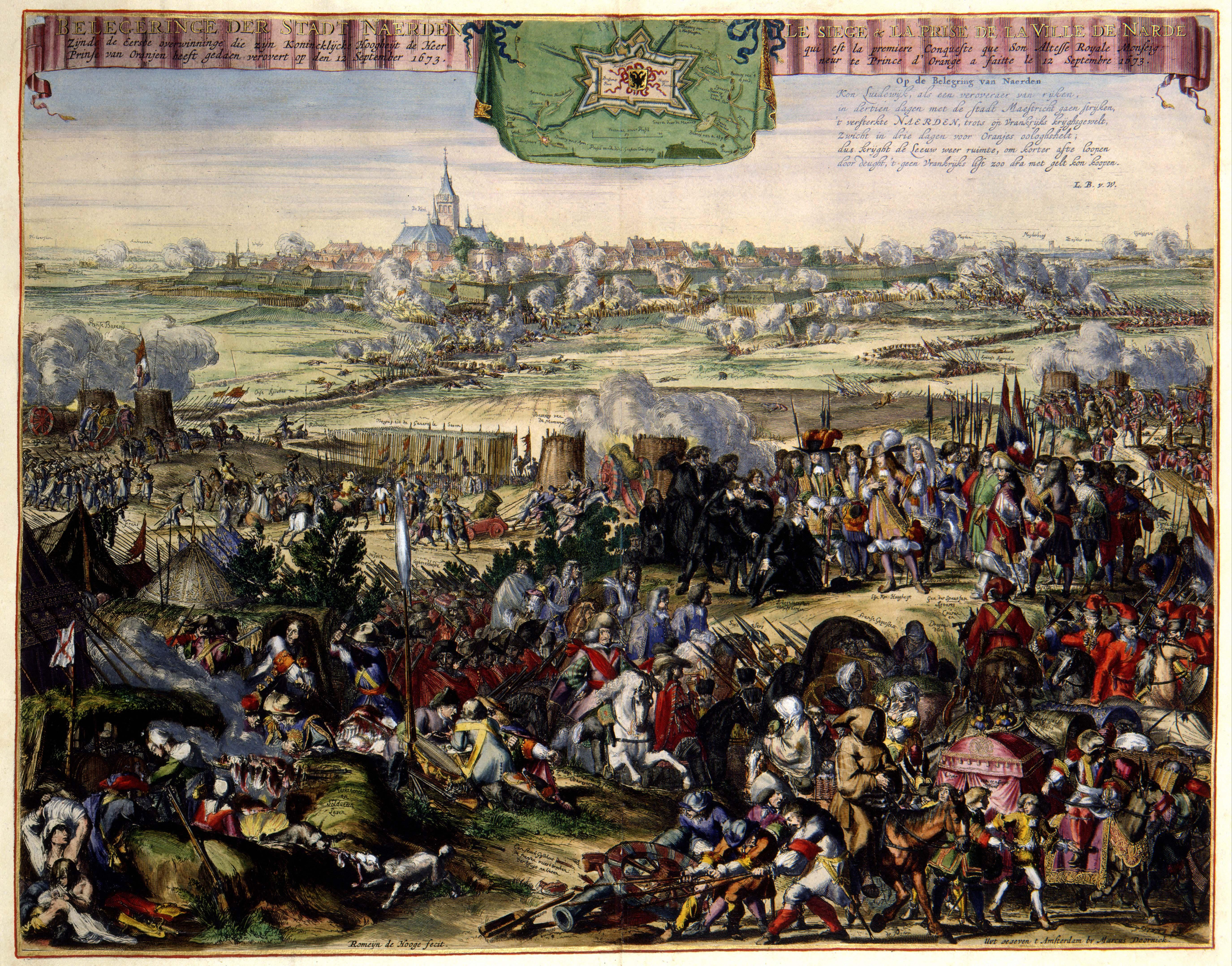
"The capture of Naarden by the Dutch led by William III in 1673. One year after it had been captured by French troops in 1672." Painted in 1673

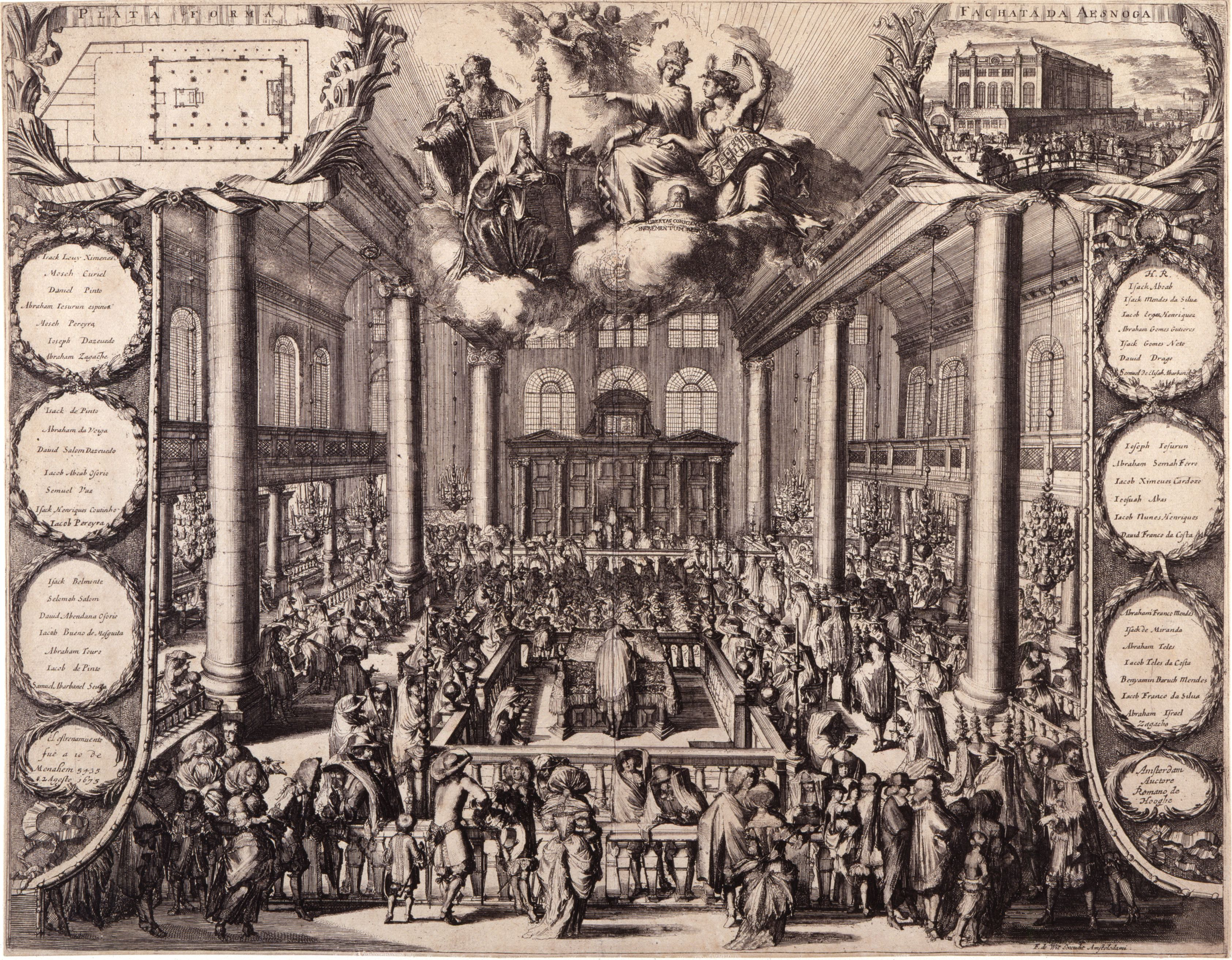
"The Portuguese synagogue in Amsterdam at its inauguration", created in 1675.

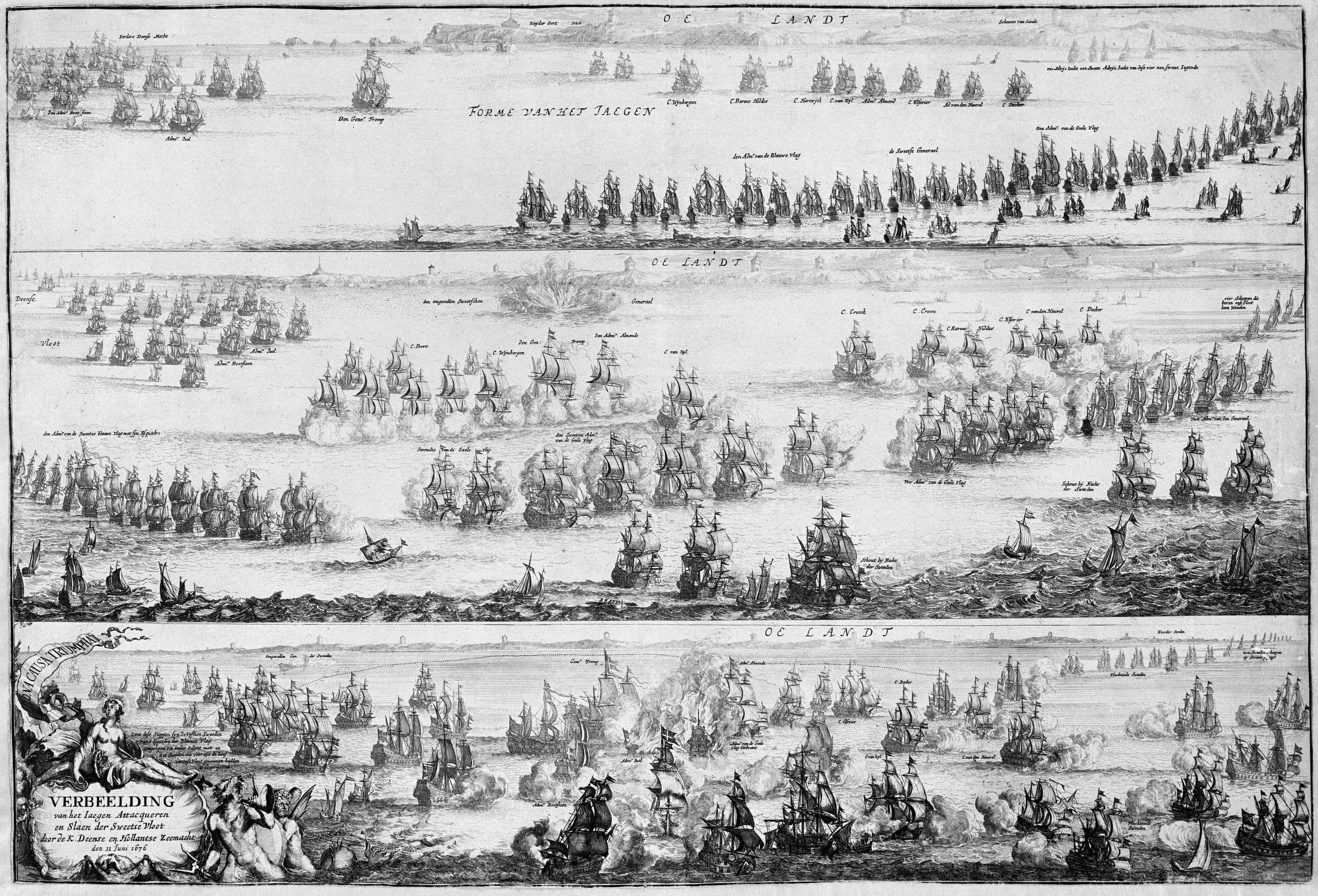
"Depiction of the Battle of Öland in 1676", Created in 1676.

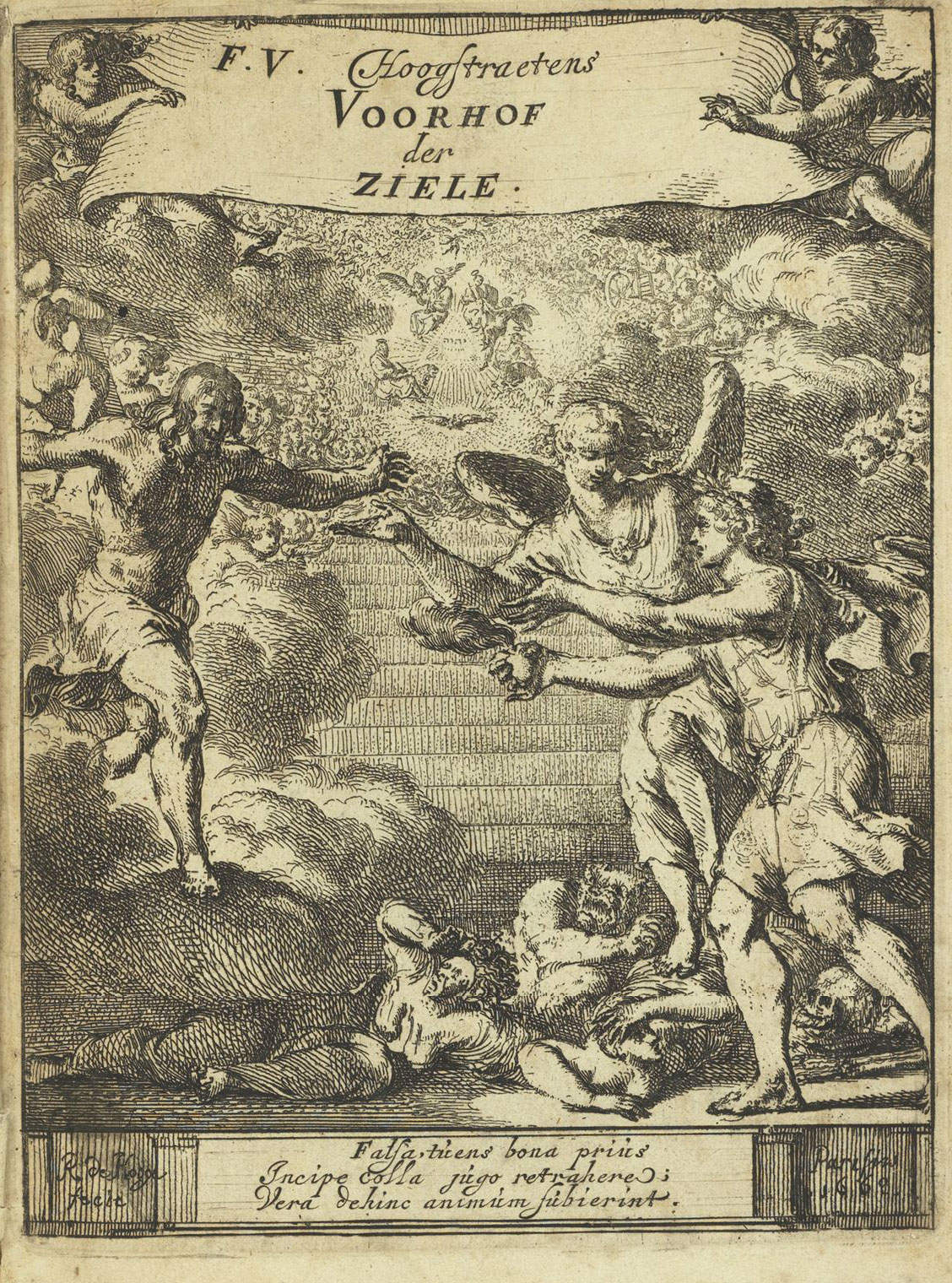
"Voorhof der Ziele" Created in 1668

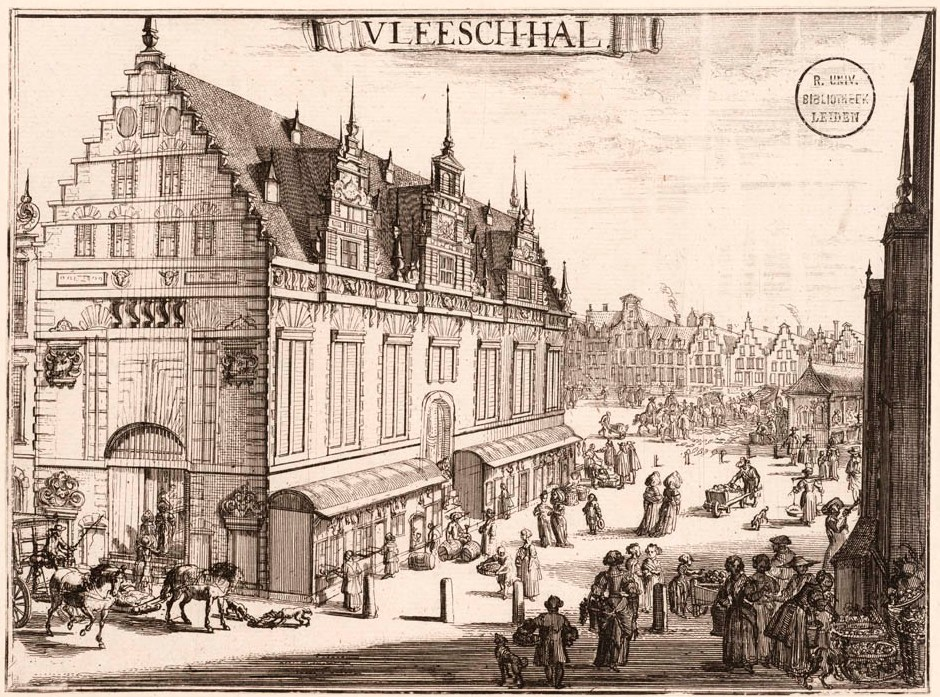
"Vleeshal Haarlem", created in 1690

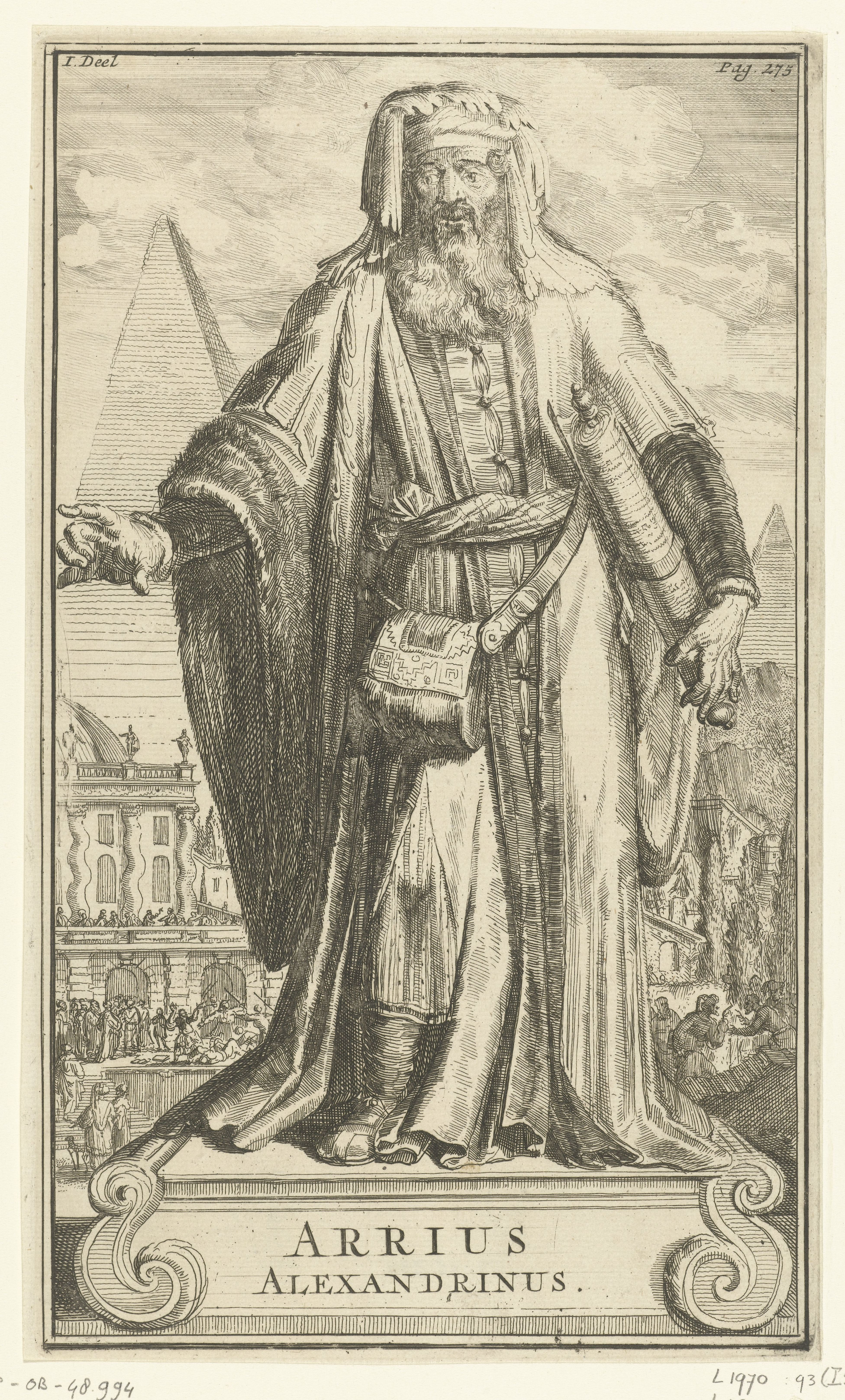
Engraving depicting Arius (250 or 256 – 336), from ‘Historie der Kerken en Ketteren van den beginne des Nieuwen Testaments tot aan het Jaar onses Heeren 1688. […]’ (transl.: History of Churches and Heretics from the start of the New Testament until the year of our lord 1688 …), by Gottfried Arnold.

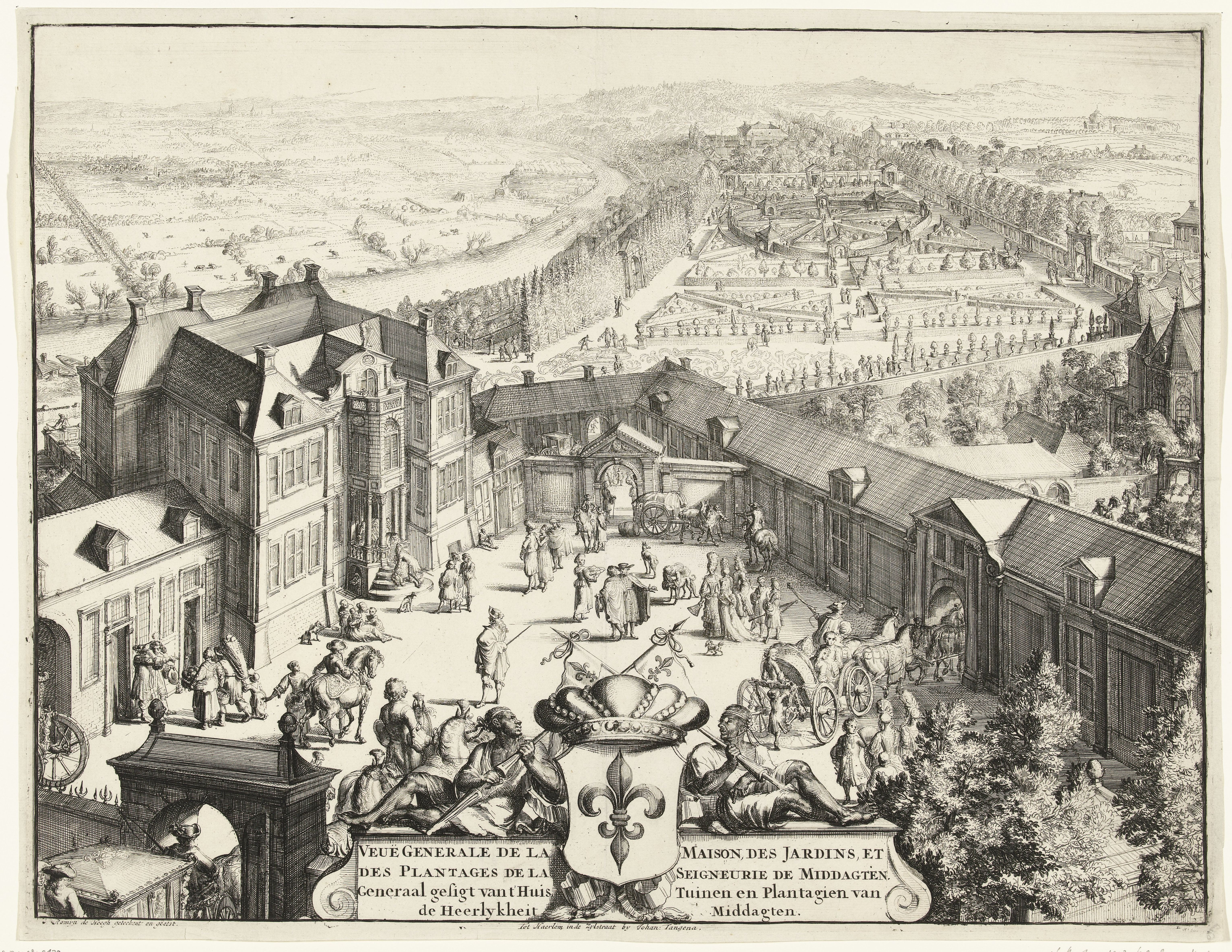
Prinzenhof palace in Kleve, created around 1685
