= Marcellus Coffermans =

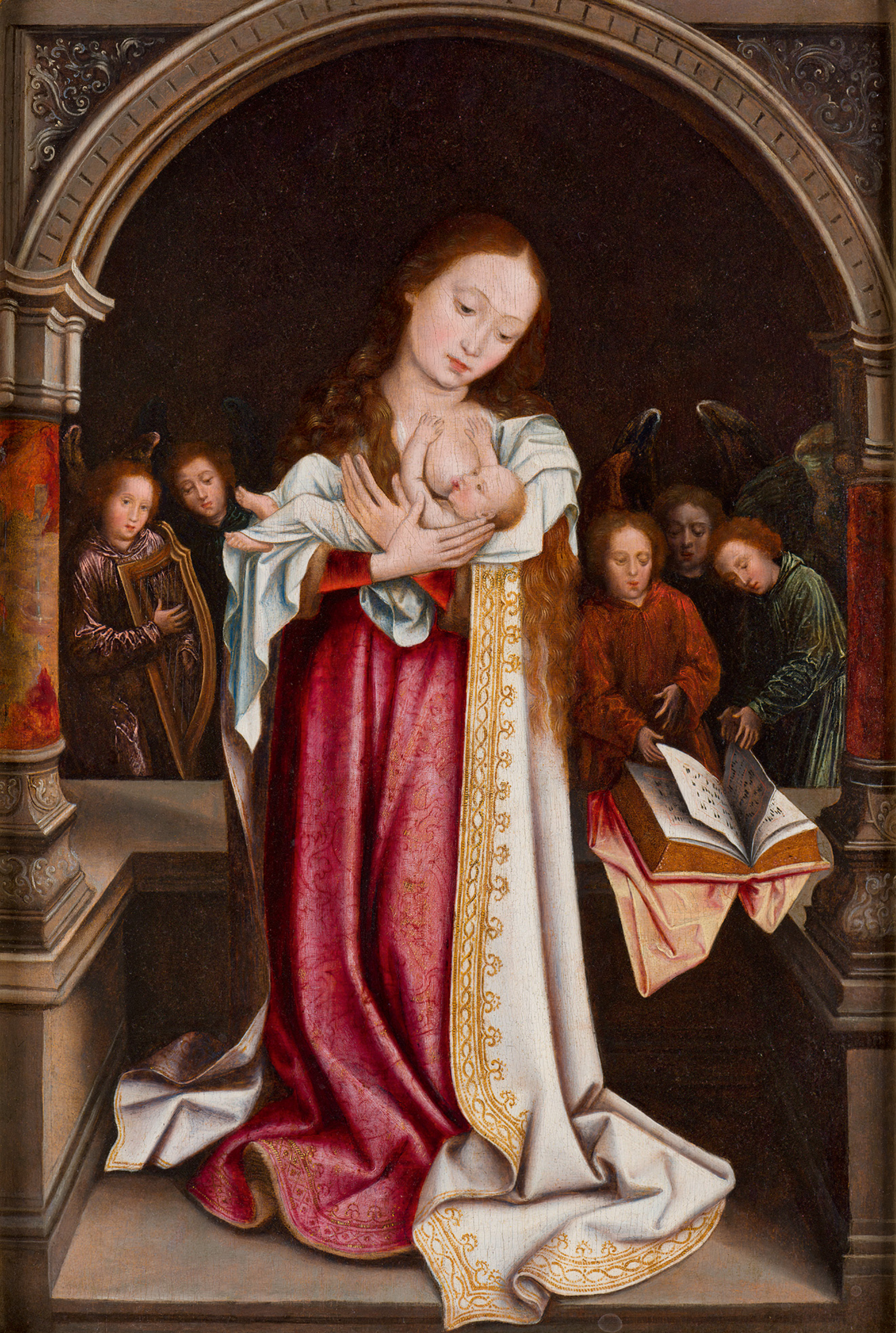
Virgin and Child in an Architectural Setting with Five Angelic Musicians

Marcellus Coffermans (c. 1525 – 17 November 1581), was a Flemish renaissance painter who was active in Antwerp from 1549 to 1581. He painted devotional panels and small-scale altarpieces and copies after works of painters of earlier generations. He worked in an old-fashioned idiom derived from the world of the Flemish Primitives such as Gerard David, Hugo van der Goes and Rogier van der Weyden as well as the graphic work of Martin Schongauer. His large workshop in Antwerp exported many works to the Spanish and Portuguese markets where his old-fashioned style was much appreciated.

== Life ==
The birthplace and date of Coffermans are not known with certainty. He was likely born around 1624 as on 9 August 1570 he testified to be 45 years old. He may have been born in Helmond as some of his works are signed with 'MARCEL.HELMON.FE[CIT]'. He was admitted as a master in the Guild of St. Luke of Antwerp in 1549. In 1554 Lucas Edelinck became his pupil.

He married Lysbeth Beermans (Berckmans) before 1563. Their daughter Ysabella (or Isabella, died before 1587) trained as a painter with her father and was admitted as a master in the Antwerp Guild of St. Luke in 1575. Their daughter Clara became a nun in Alicante near Lisbon, their son Godefridus became a Franciscan friar and their daughter Maria married the painter Dominicus de Duitsche.

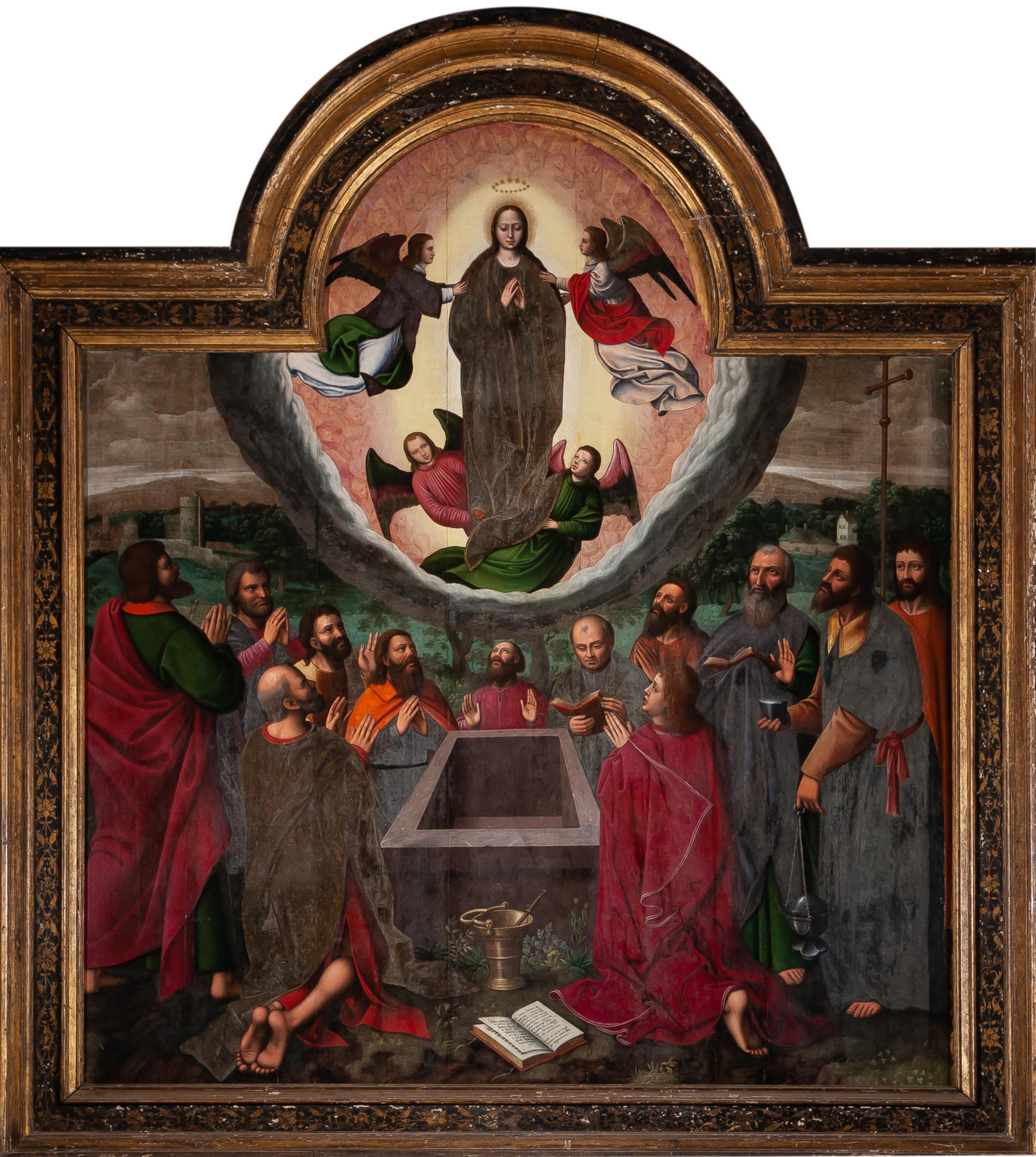
Assumption of the Virgin

On 11 September 1563 Coffermans, his wife, the painter Jan van Wechelen and his wife authorized Cornelis Oliviers to sell a house in the Jezusstraat. On 1 February 1565 Coffermans became guardian of the children of Jan Perez de Florian. On 9 August 1570, Coffermans and the painter Anthonis Bocx testified about the late Lucas Edelinck, the former pupil of Coffermans. He married Kathelijne Uyten (or Catlijne Uterwuringhe, died in 1583) after the death of his first wife. The couple had no surviving children at the time of his death. On 27 December 1580 Coffermans and his second wife made their will.

He died on 17 November 1581 in his house called 'De Meersman'. At the time of his death the wealth he had accumulated during his earlier career as a successful painter had largely dissipated.
