= Frederik Bouttats the Elder =

Flemish painter, engraver, printmaker, and dealer in prints

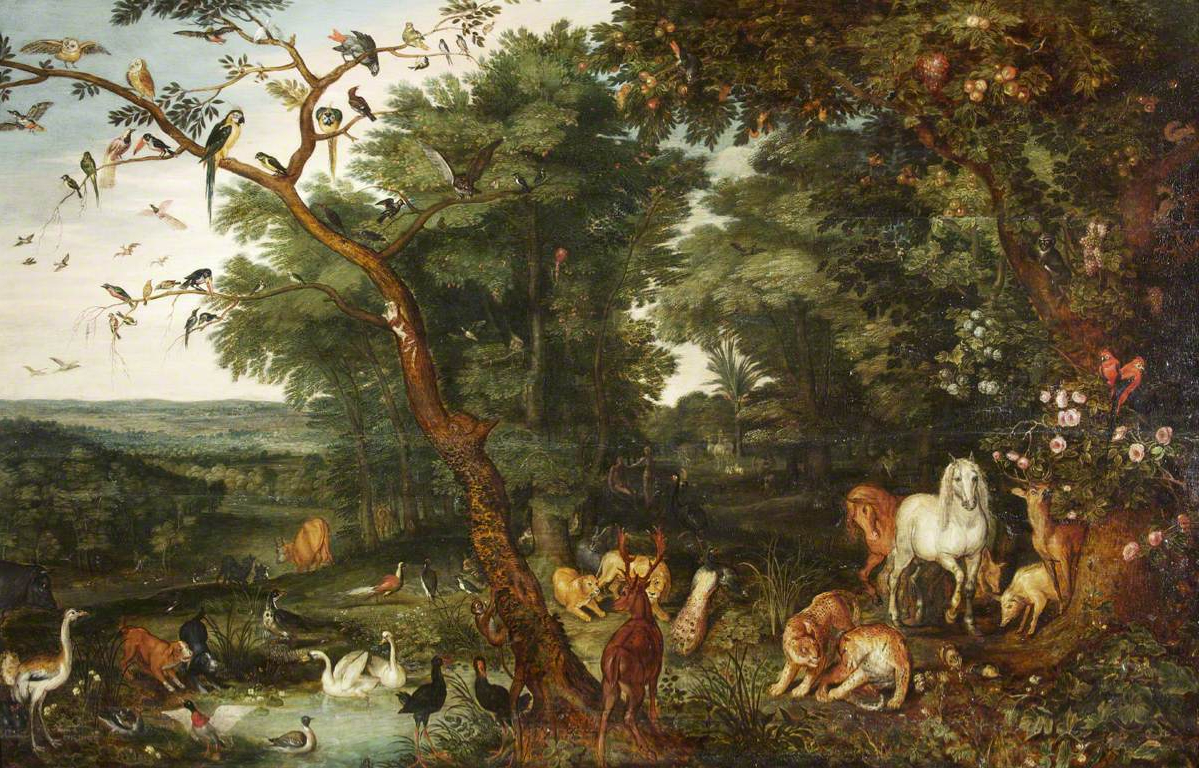
The Garden of Eden

Frederik Bouttats the Elder or Frederik Bouttats (I) (Antwerp, 1590 – Antwerp, 1661) was a Flemish painter, engraver, printmaker and dealer in prints. He is known for his reproductive prints after famous painters and portraits. He was also involved in the production and sales of devotional prints. There is some confusion about the attribution of works to various artists called Frederik Bouttats. To him have been attributed some landscapes with the garden of Eden in the style of Jan Brueghel the Elder.

== Life ==
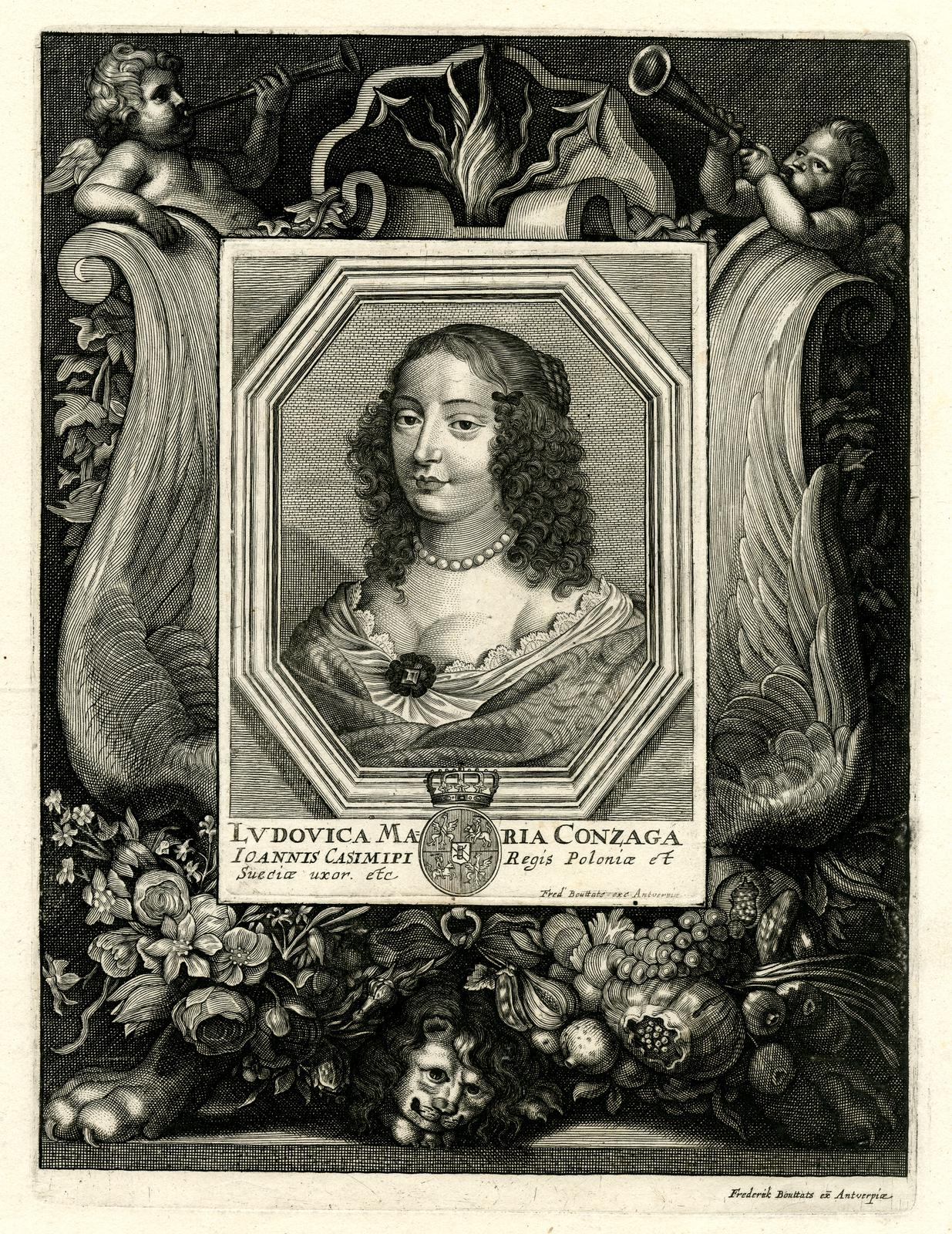
Portrait of Marie Louise Gonzaga

Bouttats was born in Antwerp in 1590. He was a pupil of the painter and art dealer Matthijs Willenhoudt he is mentioned as an apprentice. He became a master of the Guild of Saint Luke in Antwerp in 1612.

He married Machteld (Mathilde) van de Wouwere, with whom he had one child, Frederik, who followed in his father's footsteps. After the death of his wife on 8 January 1629 he married Maria de Weerdt, with whom he had 8 children.

His pupils were his sons Frederik, Jaeckes vander Vloet, Joris Herteborst and Frederick Hendrick van den Hove.

He died in Antwerp in 1661. When his widow died on 25 August 1673, she left seven children: Jacobmijne (widow of Petrus Clouwet), Magdalena, Magnus, Philibert, Magdalena, Norbertus Bouttats, Ignatius and Jasper (Gaspar).

== Work ==
Bouttats was mainly a reproductive artist who made prints after paintings and designs of prominent painters of his time and engraved portraits. He was active as a printmaker and dealer of devotional prints.

There is some confusion about the attribution of works to various artists called Frederik Bouttats.

As a painter he seems to have mainly created copies or works in the style of Jan Brueghel the Elder.
