= Jan van Wechelen =

Flemish painter

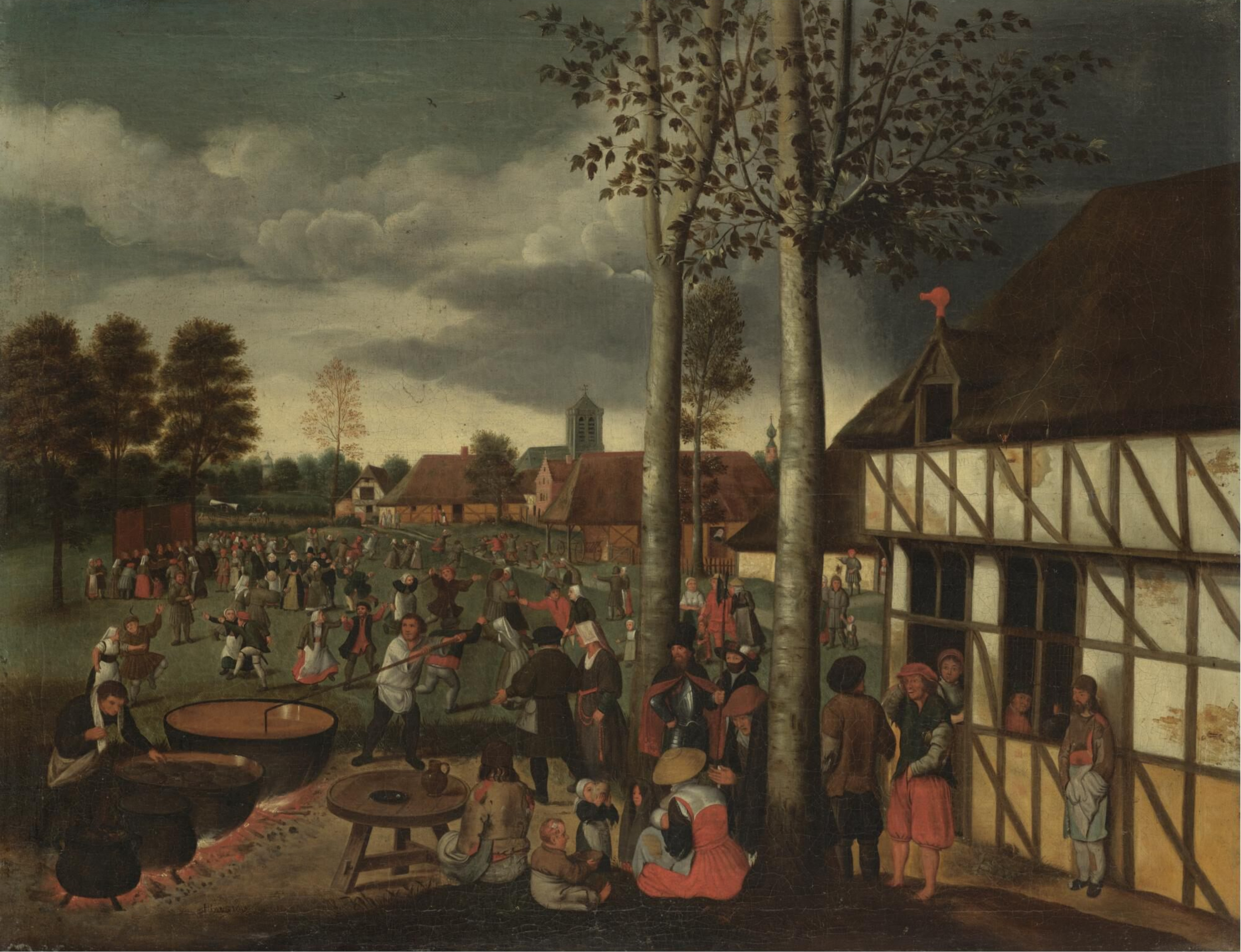
Peasants merrymaking at a village kermesse

Jan van Wechelen or Hans van Wechelen (c. 1530 – 1570) was a Flemish painter and draughtsman active in Antwerp in the middle of the 16th century known for his landscapes, biblical subjects and genre scenes.

== Life ==
Details about his life are scarce. Jan van Wechelen was born some time between 1530 and 1537.

He is first mentioned in 1557 as Jan van Wechlen, the master of an apprentice by the name of Hans de Boeys in the records of the Guild of Saint Luke in Antwerp. He is known for his collaborations with Cornelis van Dalem.

== Work ==
=== General ===
Only a few works by Jan van Wechelen are known to exist as most of his oeuvre was destroyed by war and the Iconoclasm of the 16th century. The majority of these are landscapes and religious scenes. His oeuvre also includes a few genres scenes and an architectural painting of a church interior. The artist's work enjoyed an excellent reputation at the beginning of the 17th century and was collected by Rubens as well as the prominent art collectors Cornelis van der Geest and Pieter Stevens.

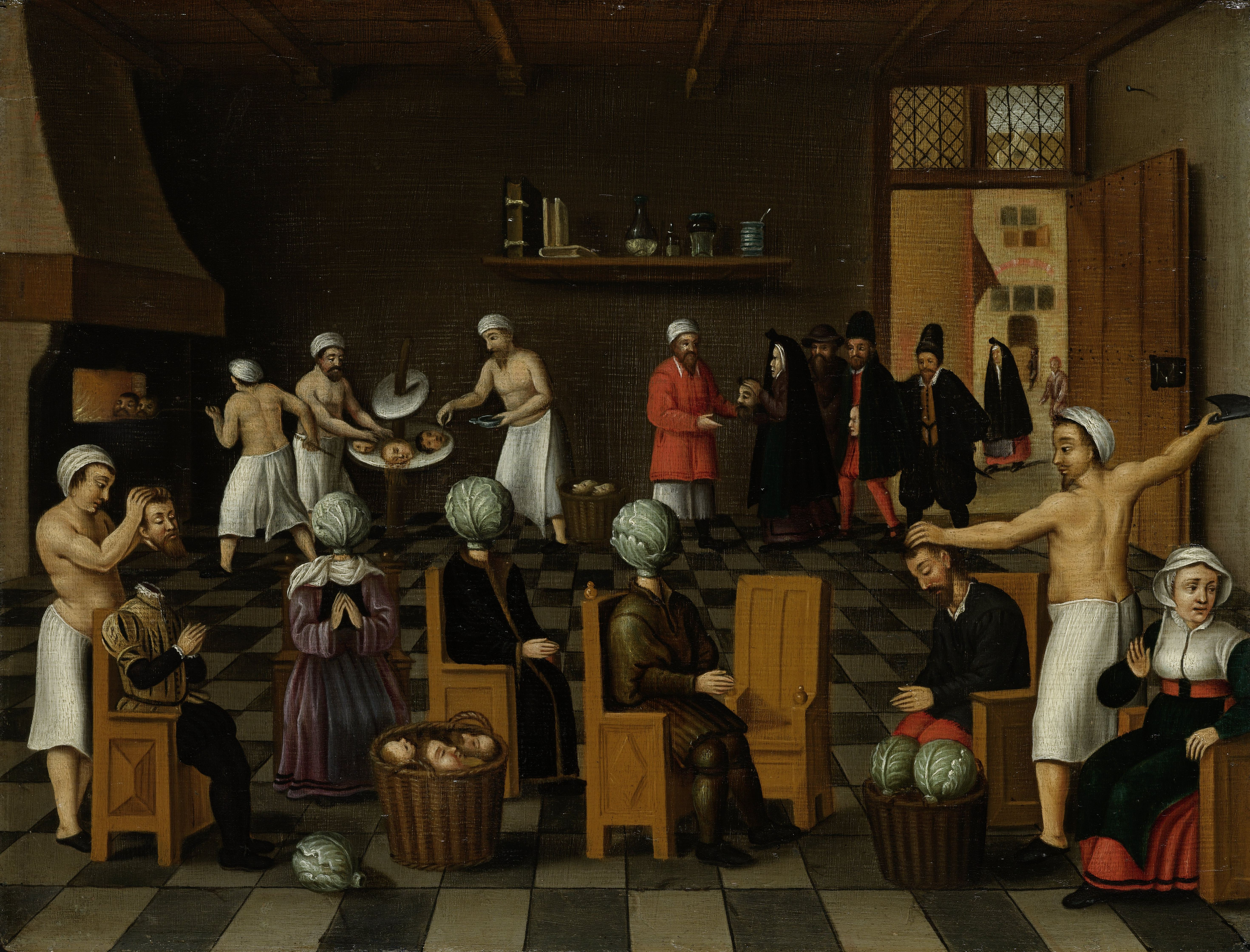
The Legend of the Baker of Eeklo

Jan van Wechelen collaborated regularly with fellow Antwerp artist Cornelis van Dalem. Van Wechelen was a gifted staffage painter and his dignified figures are regarded as well suited to van Dalem's landscapes. At least three such collaborations between the two artists are suspected. This includes a Landscape with nomads (also known as Landscape with gypsies at the Staatliche Kunsthalle Karlsruhe. This painting likely represents a family of gypsies as a seated woman wears the distinctive oval white hat which was a common indicator for a gypsy woman in 16th century Flemish paintings.

=== The baker of Eeklo ===
An interesting genre painting made in collaboration with Cornelis van Dalem is the composition The Legend of the Baker of Eeklo. The original of the painting is lost but a presumed copy of the original is part of the collection of the Rijksmuseum and is on loan to the Muiderslot. There also exist many versions said to have been made by the circle of, or after Cornelis van Dalem and Jan van Wechelen. The composition was engraved by Frederik Bouttats the Younger.

The painting depicts a legend told about the citizens of Eeklo in Flanders. When they were unhappy with the look of their heads, they would go to the village bakery. There the baker and his assistants would lop off their heads and place cabbages on their necks to stem the bleeding. The improved heads would then be kneaded and rolled, rubbed with a new finish, baked in the oven and ultimately replaced. The composition recounts the whole process. However, there was always the risk that a new head would fail to bake, or over-bake, thus resulting in a deformed or deficient head. There is a scene of a woman holding a severed head who is having a discussion with the baker dressed in red. She is probably trying to return the head of her husband with which she is not happy. This story had a moral and cautionary message to those who were dissatisfied with their appearance and wanted to do something drastic about it.

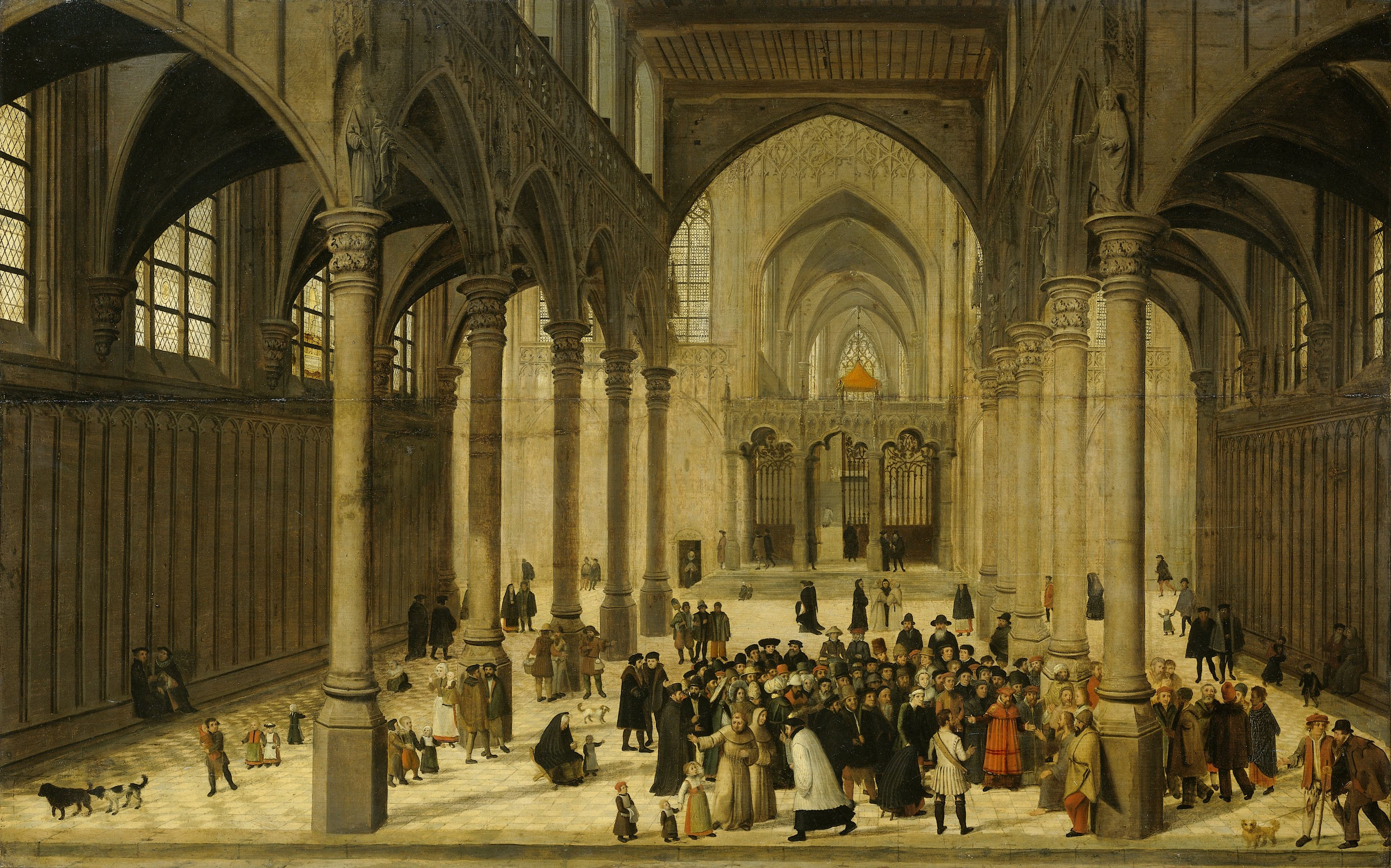
Church interior with Christ preaching to a crowd

=== Church interior with Christ preaching to a crowd ===
A composition entitled Church interior with Christ preaching to a crowd (Rijksmuseum) is attributed to a collaboration between van Wechelen and van Dalem. It shows a large church interior with a crowd of people in contemporary as well as foreign dress who are listening to Jesus Christ who is preaching while seated near a column. The interior of the church is quite barren and the only decorations seen are some sculptures high on the columns. Various scenes are depicted in the interior of the church such as priests chasing away children, a man with a walking stick and a dog who is accosted by a man in thorn clothes (a beggar?), some dogs sniffing each other, a couple flirting, a man with a shovel etc.

Van Dalem, his collaborator on this composition, was suspected of being a Protestant and possibly the composition contains criticism of the Catholic Church. By placing a preaching Jesus amidst modern church architecture and a contemporary crowd the composition should possibly also be read against the background of the iconoclasm of the Beeldenstorm, which had caused a reflection on the role of religious art in the Low Countries. The attack on sculptures and paintings had placed the entire church interior under discussion. Finding answers to questions such as what a church should be, which type of architecture was suitable and how it should be embellished had become urgent. Contemporary religious practice was compared with the words and deeds of Christ and his apostles and the past and the future of religion, its temples and its rites were under scrutiny.

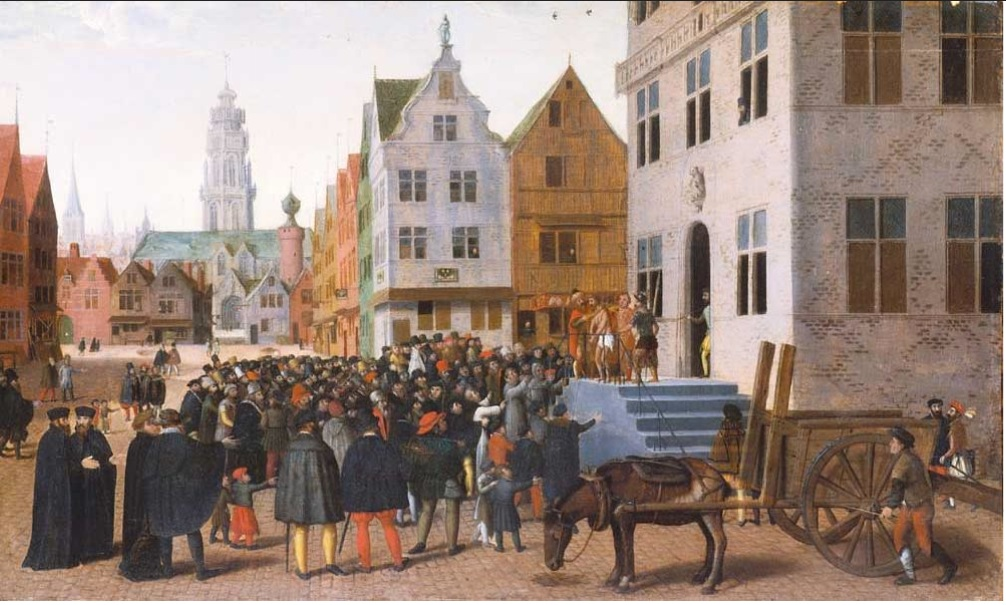
Ecce Homo

=== Kermesse ===
Jan van Wechelen produced three versions of a composition representing a village kermesse with peasants making merry. The prime version painted on panel is now in a private European collection, while two other versions were sold at Sotheby's respectively on 1 April 1992 (lot 57, on panel) and 5 December 2007 (lot 19, on canvas). There are some differences between the various versions.

Jan van Wechelen succeeded in these genre scenes to bring the kermesses to life. He was close to Pieter Brueghel the Elder in his ability to animate these picturesque scenes with a great number of characters with comical and delightful attitudes. The realism in his genre paintings reveal a rather profane spirit while his lines with clearly emphasized forms connect his work to the rigorist trends that were developing in the Low Countries around 1540.

=== Religious paintings ===
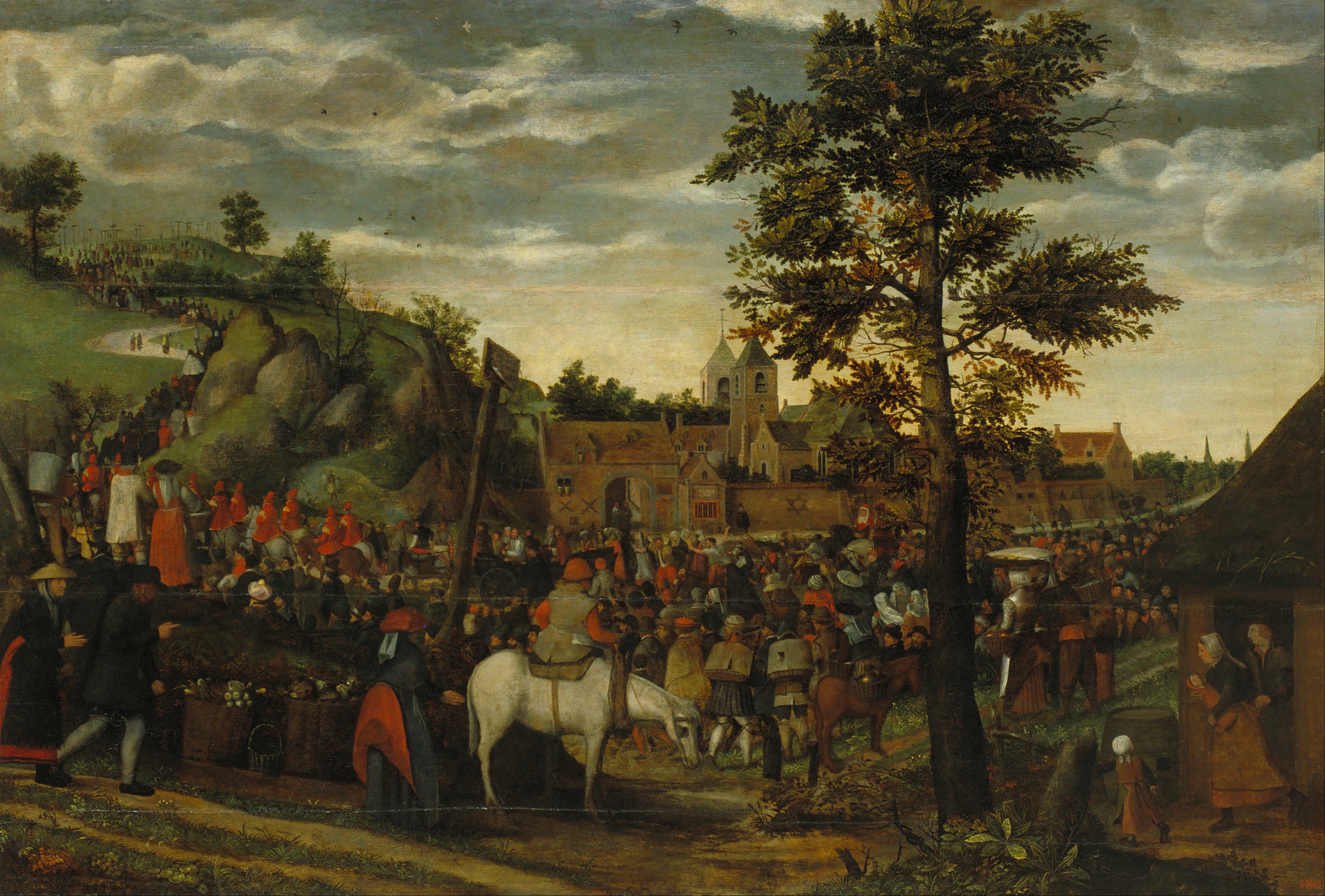
Road to Calvary

Jan van Wechelen painted a number of religious compositions. His Ecce Homo (Indianapolis Museum of Art) reprises a theme and setting that had become popular in Flemish art from the 15th century. Placing this subject matter of Jesus being shown to the people in a contemporary setting was not uncommon as is demonstrated by a work of Gillis Mostaert, which places the scene on the main square of Antwerp. By staging the dramatic scene on the square of a Flemish town an accusation of sinfulness and culpability is directed at the contemporary crowd witnessing the event. That children also share culpability is implied by the prominent presence of children among the spectators. The cartload of crosses in the foreground on the right refers to the people's call for Christ's execution.

Jan van Wechelen painted at least two versions of the Road to Calvary, another theme popularized by Pieter Brueghel the Elder. One of the paintings is in the Museu Nacional d'Art de Catalunya and the other one in a private collection (previously Oppenheimer collection). Van Wechelen opted to place this passion scene against the backdrop of a contemporary town. In the foreground are people coming out of their houses and leaving their vegetable stalls to get closer and get a better view of the 'show'.
