= Cornelis van Dalem =

Flemish painter

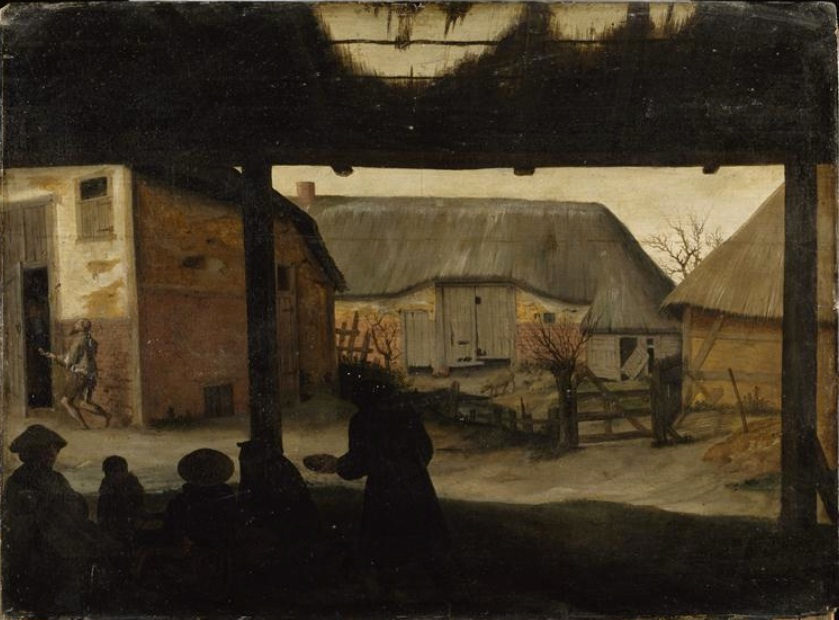
Farmyard with a beggar

Cornelis van Dalem (1530/35 – 1573 or 1576) was a Flemish painter and draughtsman active in Antwerp in the middle of the 16th century. He was an important contributor to the development of landscape art in the Low Countries. Van Dalem introduced new themes into landscape painting, which he derived from his humanistic education, and searched for new ways of representing his themes.

== Life and family ==
Details about Van Dalem's life are scarce. He was likely born in Antwerp. His father was a nobleman originally from Tholen who had moved to Antwerp where he was operating as a cloth merchant. His father was active in the local Chamber of rhetoric 'De Olyftack' in Antwerp and was the chamber's dean in 1552–3.

The van Dalem family was a cultured family. Cornelis and his older brother Lodewijk likely enjoyed a humanistic education and were both trained as painters with the obscure artist Jan Adriaensens. Cornelis commenced his training in 1543 and became a master in the Guild of Saint Luke in 1556. The same year, he married Beatrix van Liedekercke, a member of a wealthy family.

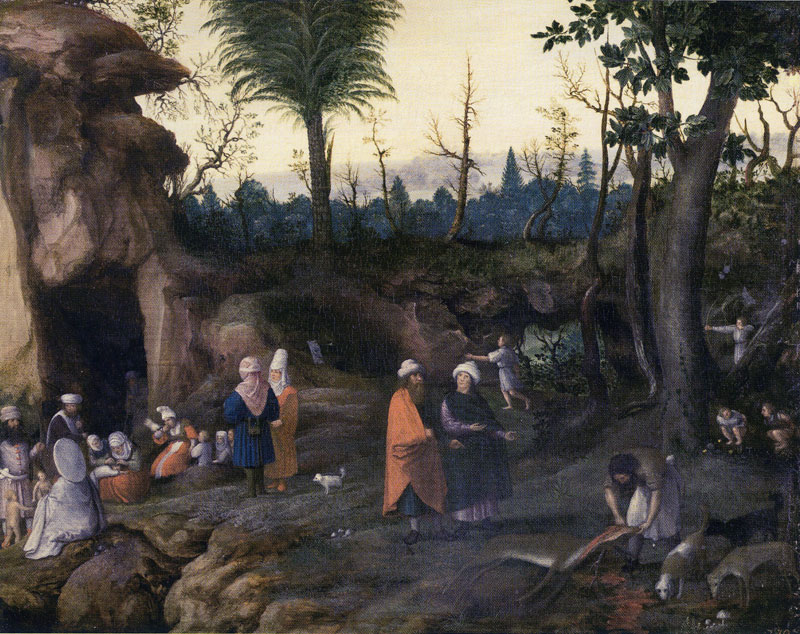
Landscape with nomads with Jan van Wechelen

Despite being a member of the Guild of Saint Luke, Cornelis van Dalem only practiced painting as an amateur and he remained a merchant his entire career. He was independently wealthy and did not need to rely on his art to make a living. However, he regarded art as an important part of his life as is demonstrated by the way he decorated the facade of his Antwerp residence. Cornelis had the façade of his house decorated with a splendour not seen in Northern Europe. The façade had a relief of the goddess Pictura in front of an easel, of Minerva and Mercury as well the stone busts of Durer and Jan van Eyck with laudatory inscriptions.

Bartholomeus Spranger was a registered pupil of van Dalem from 1560 to 1564. Van Dalem appears not to have been concerned much about teaching Spranger the art of painting but more about ensuring that his apprentice kept his studio clean and tidy. At the end of his four years of apprenticeship, Spranger is said to have been frustrated about his lack of progress.

Around this time, there were also increasing rumours about the possible heretical leanings of the van Dalem household: it was said they never went to the Catholic Church but rather attended Protestant gatherings. These rumours appear to have forced the van Dalems to leave Antwerp and settle on a castle near Breda. Accusations of heresy were said to have been reiterated against Cornelis in 1571 and he may have given refuge to a radical sect of Anabaptists. He died in Breda in 1573.

== Work ==
=== General ===
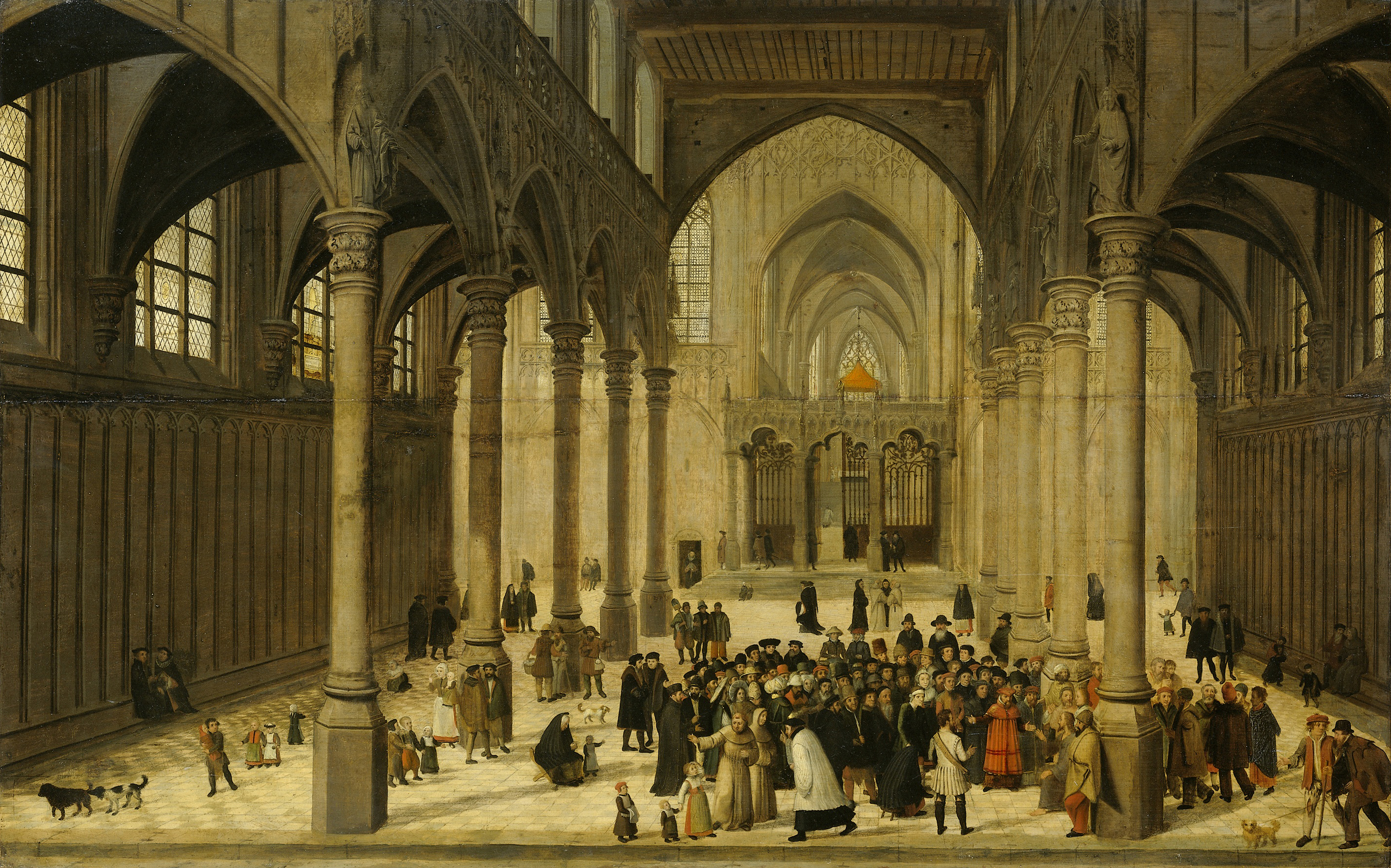
Church Interior with Christ Preaching to a Crowd

Only a few works by Cornelis van Dalem are known, most of them landscapes. His oeuvre also includes a few genres scenes and possibly an architectural painting of a church interior. He is considered one of the possible candidates for the authorship of the series of landscape drawings attributed to the Master of the Small Landscapes. Van Dalem's notability lies in the fact that he introduced new themes into landscape painting (such as the origin of civilization), which he derived from his humanistic education, and his innovative way of representing his themes.

Van Dalem is known to have collaborated regularly with his fellow artists who painted the staffage in his landscapes or architectural paintings. His most regular collaborator was Jan van Wechelen with whom at least three collaborations are suspected. He further worked with Gillis Mostaert (who may have painted the staffage in the Landscape with Farmhouse, Alte Pinakothek), as well as with Joachim Beuckelaer.

=== 'Rock paintings' ===
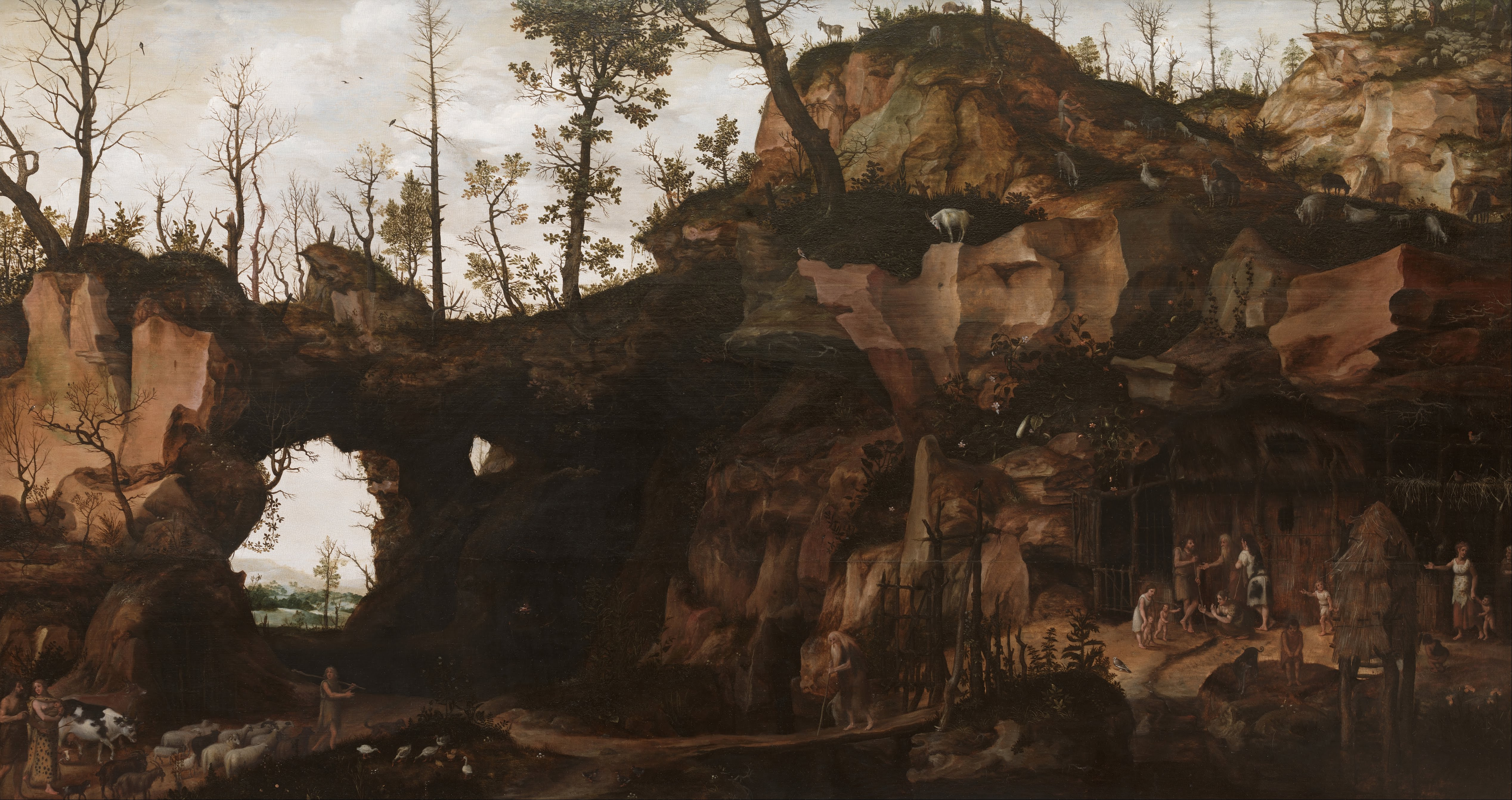
The dawn of civilization

The early 17th century artist biographer Karel van Mander called van Dalem an excellent painter of rocks ('fraye schilder van rotsen'). And indeed several of his landscape paintings feature extensive rock parties with grottos. Examples are the Landscape with Adam and Eve of 1564 (Iris & B. Gerald Cantor Center for Visual Arts) and the Landscape with herders of c. 1560 (Prado Museum). Van Dalem's rock landscapes often include a grotto where some human activity is going on. These works had an influence on Joos de Momper who was an important adept of the genre and created about 70 paintings of this motif.

One of the most ambitious grotto scenes painted by van Dalem was the composition referred to as The dawn of civilization (Museum Boijmans Van Beuningen). In this complex composition van Dalem attempts to depict the origin of human civilization, a very challenging topic for a painting. Only one artist is known to have attempted this subject matter before: the Italian Piero di Cosimo who painted a number of paintings of the state of mankind just before the onset of civilization one of which is in the Ashmolean Museum. Di Cosimo's works deal with the history of early man and derive their visual inspiration from passages in Book 5 of De rerum natura by Lucretius (98-c.55BC), in which the role of fire is emphasized in the origins of life on earth and the birth of community life. Di Cosimo stresses the devastating effects of uncontrolled fire in his composition.

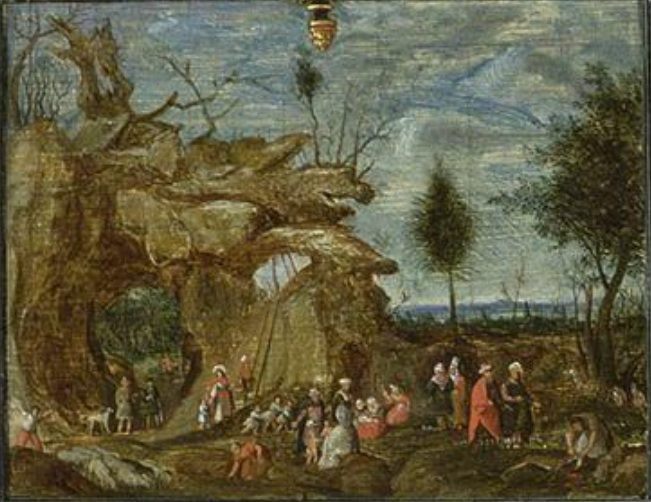
Rocky landscape with nomads

Van Dalem's composition, which was probably made in 1565, is dominated by a high, steep cliff which only leaves a small strip of heaven at the top of the painting. A large round hole in the rock allows a view onto a wide landscape in the distance. The top of the rock is covered with trees and shrubs that are painted very precisely and a flute-playing shepherd descends the cliff amidst his herd of goats. Below the cliff is a cave covered with reeds and people clad in rough clothes. It has been surmised that van Dalem intended to depict primitive man in his natural environment, as described in the De rerum natura. He shows in his composition several elements that were deemed at the time to play a role in the civilization process such as communication, fixed housing, domestication of animals, and culture (music). The old man in the middle of the painting steps out of a sort of primitive gate, which symbolizes the border between nature and civilization.

The painting of van Dalem which is represented in the famous gallery painting of The Gallery of Cornelis van der Geest by Willem van Haecht also treats a similar subject. Van Dalem's picture is the one just below the chandelier and is referred to as Rocky landscape with nomads. This composition appears to depict a further stage of development in the evolution of man when people have founded communities and wear woven clothes. A painting with a similar subject matter depicting the Flight into Eypt was formerly in the Gemäldegalerie, Berlin but was lost during World War II.

=== Nature vs culture ===
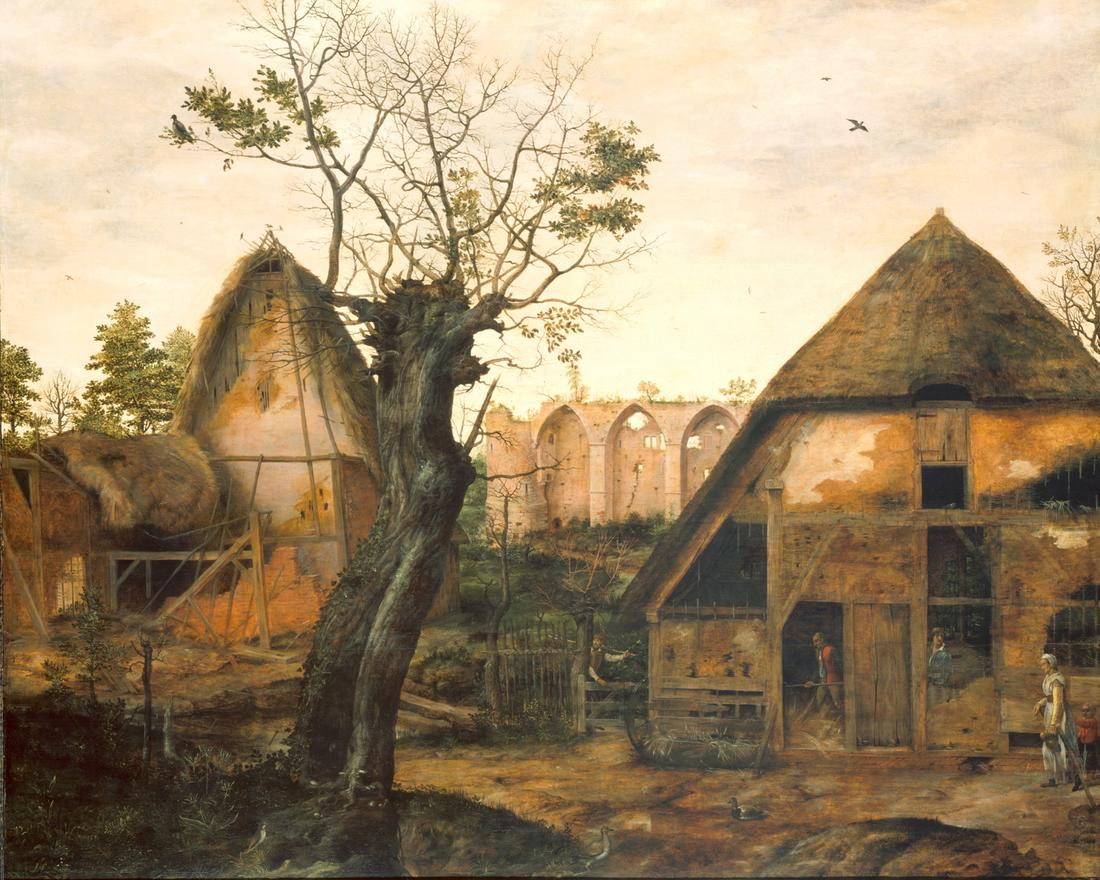
Landscape with Farmhouse

The paintings dealing with the subject of the development of civilization find their counterpart in the composition Landscape with Farmhouse (1564, Alte Pinakothek). Here van Dalem seems to address the topic of the decay of culture, which is represented in the form of a ruined church, dilapidated hut and barren trees and earth.

The composition's theme of the eternal conflict of man and nature further refers to the idea of the lost paradise and the futility of the efforts of mankind to return to that lost age in which man and nature were one. An alternative reading of the meaning of picture is that it refers to the decay of the Catholic Church particularly because van Dalem put his signature in the ruins of the church.

=== The baker of Eeklo ===
An interesting foray into genre painting is the composition The Legend of the Baker of Eeklo which he painted in collaboration with Jan van Wechelen. The original of the painting is lost but a presumed copy of the original is part of the collection of the Rijksmuseum and is on loan to the Muiderslot. There also exist many versions said to have been made by the circle of Cornelis van Dalem and Jan van Wechelen or after Cornelis van Dalem and Jan van Wechelen. The composition was also engraved by Frederik Bouttats the Younger.

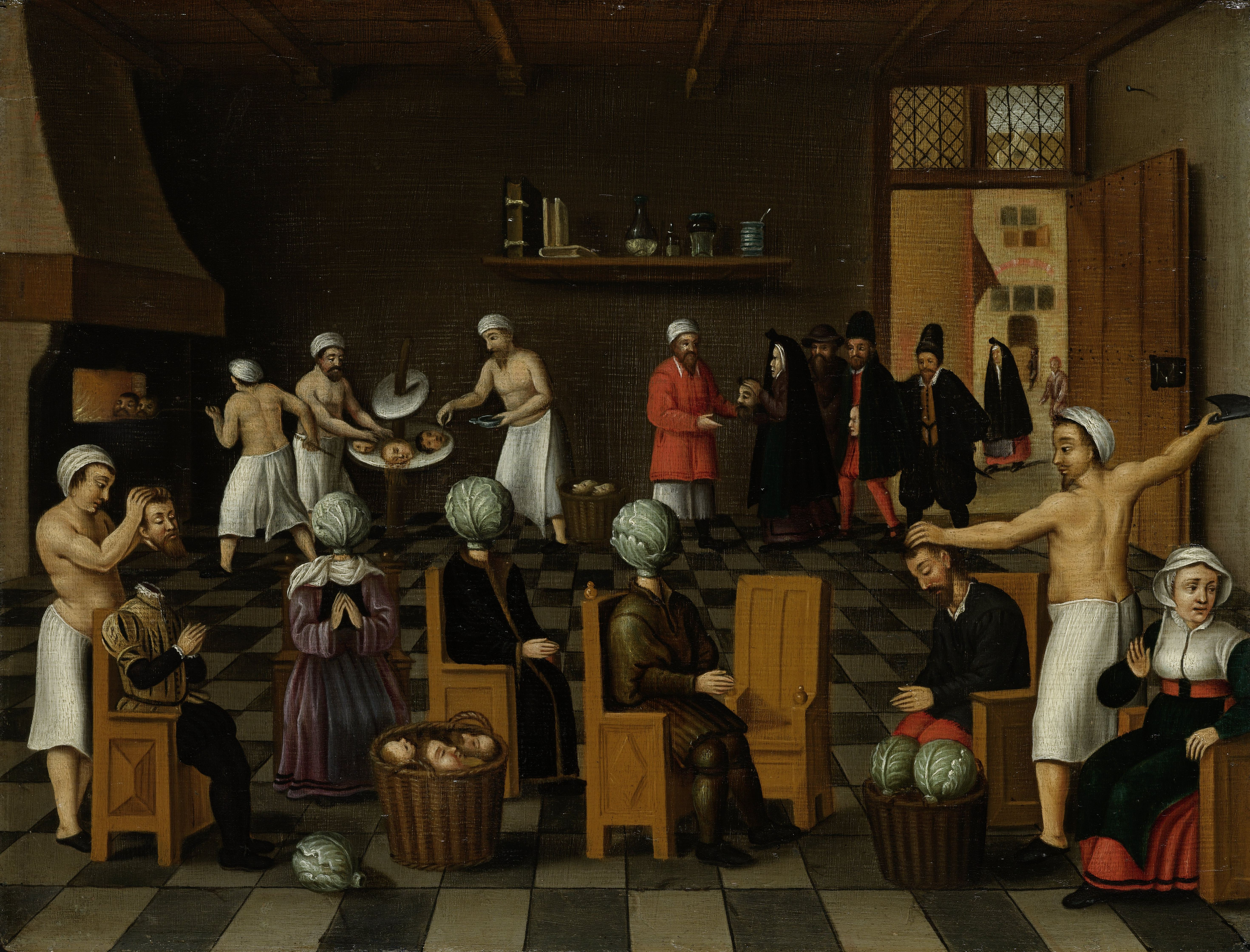
The Legend of the Baker of Eeklo

The painting depicts a legend told about the citizens of Eeklo in Flanders. When they were unhappy with the look of their heads, they would go to the village bakery. There the baker and his assistants would lop off their heads and place cabbages on their necks to stem the bleeding. The improved heads would then be kneaded and rolled, rubbed with a new finish, baked in the oven and ultimately replaced. The composition recounts the whole process. However, there was always the risk that a new head would fail to bake, or over-bake, thus resulting in a deformed or deficient head. At the back of the bakery we can see a woman holding a severed head who is having a discussion with the baker dressed in red. She is probably trying to return the head of her husband with which she is not happy. This story had a moral and cautionary message for those who were dissatisfied with their appearance and wanted to do something drastic about it.

=== Publishing ===
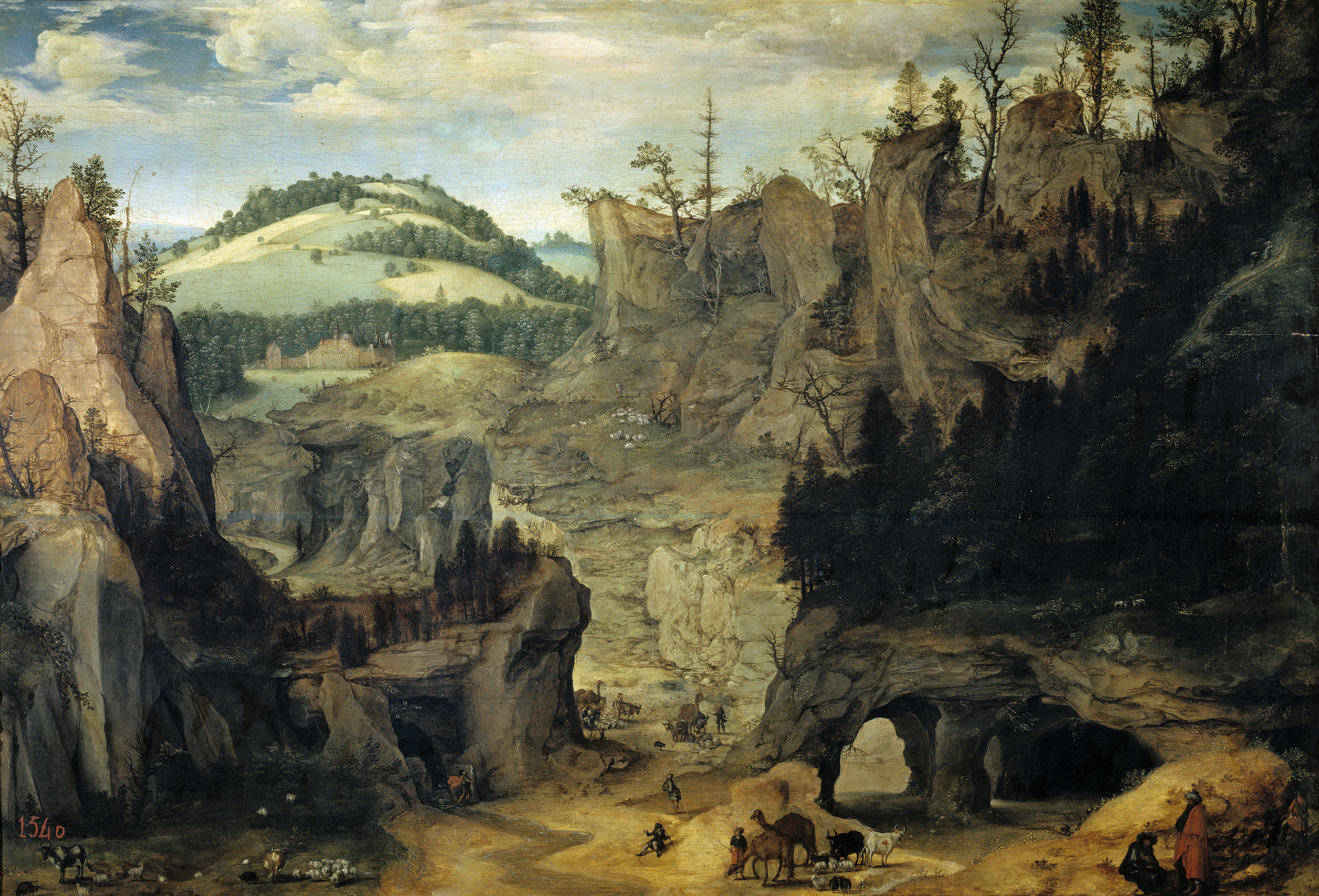
Landscape with herders

Cornelis van Dalem was also involved in publishing activities. In 1561 he was responsible for the publication of Frans Huys' two-sheet engraving of the entire Strait of Messina seen in bird's-eye view after a design by Pieter Brueghel the Elder. There is still uncertainty as to the actual level of involvement of van Dalem in the publication of this engraving. It has been suggested that possibly van Dalem was only the backer and initiator in whose name the publishing privilege was issued and that the actual publishing was undertaken by an established publisher, such as Hieronymus Cock.

== Reception ==
Cornelis van Dalem's paintings were highly esteemed by the next generation of artists: Peter Paul Rubens's estate included one of his works, and a representation of one of his paintings is featured in the famous gallery painting of The Gallery of Cornelis van der Geest by Willem van Haecht. The prominent 17th century Antwerp art collector Pieter Stevens is said to have owned one of his paintings. Van Dalem's name was forgotten in later ages and it was only in the early 20th century that art historians such as Ludwig Burchard rediscovered the artist and his work.
