= Philibert Bouttats =

Flemish engraver

- Born: c. 1650; Antwerp
- Died: c. 1720
- Father: Frederik Bouttats the Younger

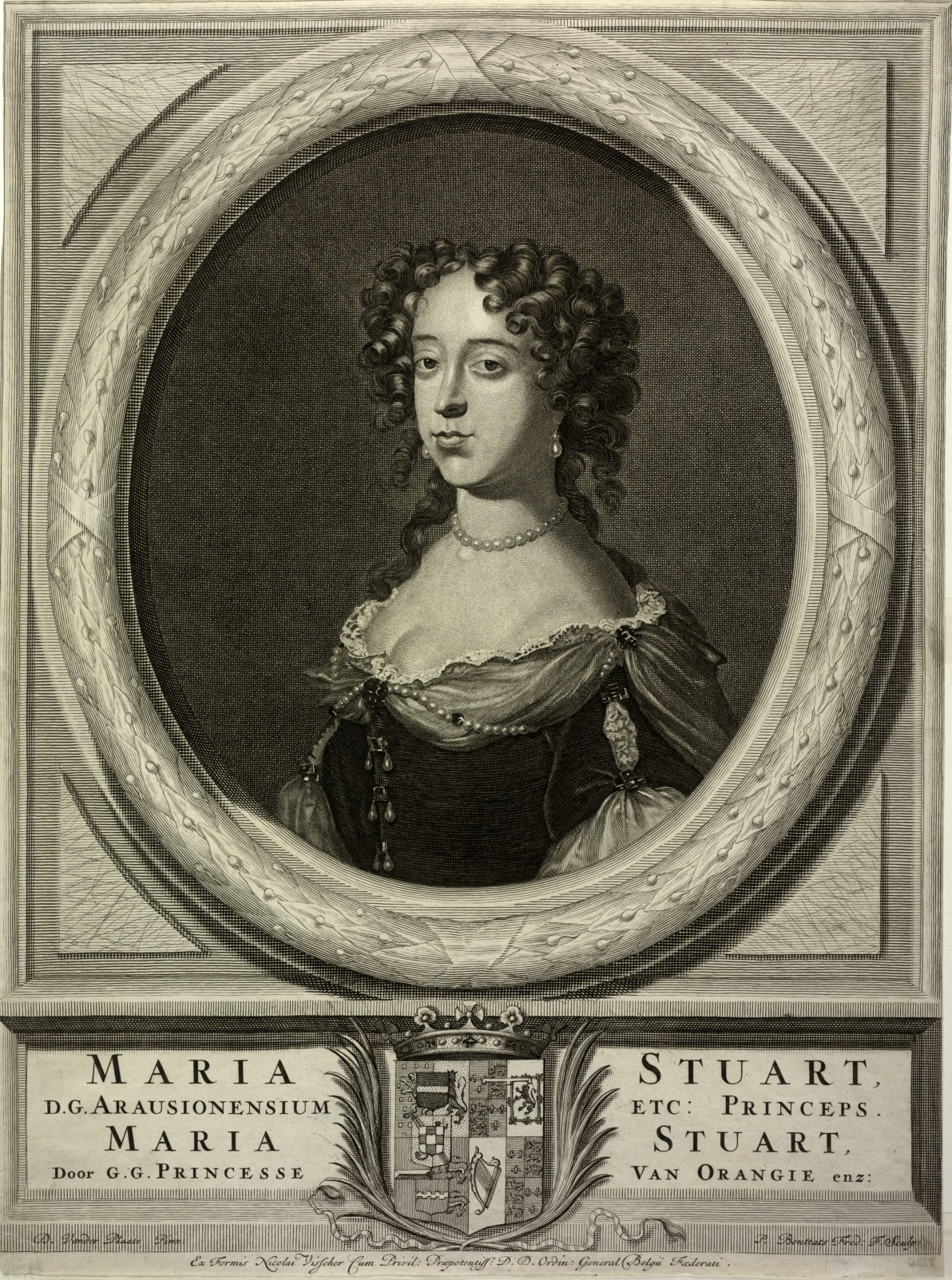
Engraving of Mary, Princess Royal and Princess of Orange

Philibert Bouttats (born c. 1650 in Antwerp - died c. 1720) was a Flemish engraver. His prints consist chiefly of portraits, and are rather neatly engraved. Bouttats was born about the year 1650, the son of Frederik Bouttats the Younger. He died at the age of 72.

== Works ==
=== Portraits ===
- Pope Innocent XI
- The Dauphin, Son of Louis XIV; oval
- Mary Antonia Victoria, of Bavaria, Dauphiness
- Elizabeth Charlotte, Duchess of Orleans
- William Henry, Prince of Orange
- Christian V, King of Denmark
- Herman Werner, Bishop of Paderborn
- John Sobieski, King of Poland
- Thesis, with the Portrait of the Bishop of Miinster

=== Other works ===
- Convent 'Bethlehem' in Herent near Leuven (1699)
