= Frederik Bouttats the Younger =

Flemish engraver (born c. 1620)

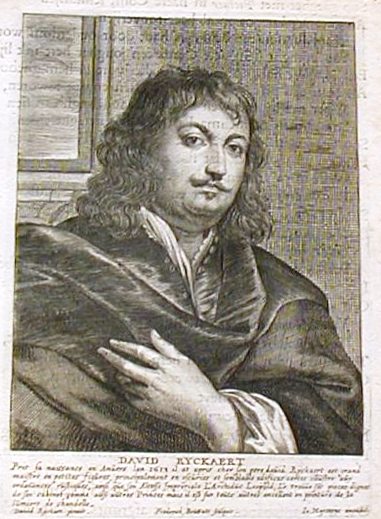
Portrait of David Ryckaert III from Het Gulden Cabinet.

Frederik Bouttats was an engraver born at Antwerp about the year 1620, where he died in 1676. He engraved several plates after his own designs, principally portraits, and some after other masters. They are worked with the graver, in a neat style, and are not without merit. We have by him, among others, the following:

- Charles Emmanuel, Duke of Savoy.
- Charles Gaspar, Elector of Treves.
- Queen Christina of Sweden.
- Oliver Cromwell.
- Frederick William, Elector of Brandenburg.
- John George, Elector of Saxony.
- Jan Baptist Heil, portrait painter; se ipse pinx.
- Daniel van Heil, landscape painter; J. B. van Heil pinx. (pictured)
- Leo van Heil, architect and painter; same painter.
- David Rijckaert, painter; se ipse pinx. (pictured)
- The Virgin and Infant Jesus, with St. John (dated 1655).
- Cavaliers and Ladies playing at Cards; F. Boutats fecit.

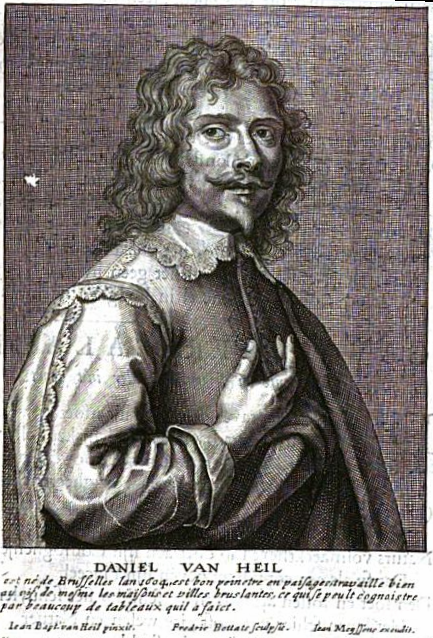
Portrait of Daniel van Heil from Het Gulden Cabinet.

He was the elder brother of Gaspar Bouttats and the father of Philibert Bouttats.
