= A Farm =

Painting by Joos de Momper

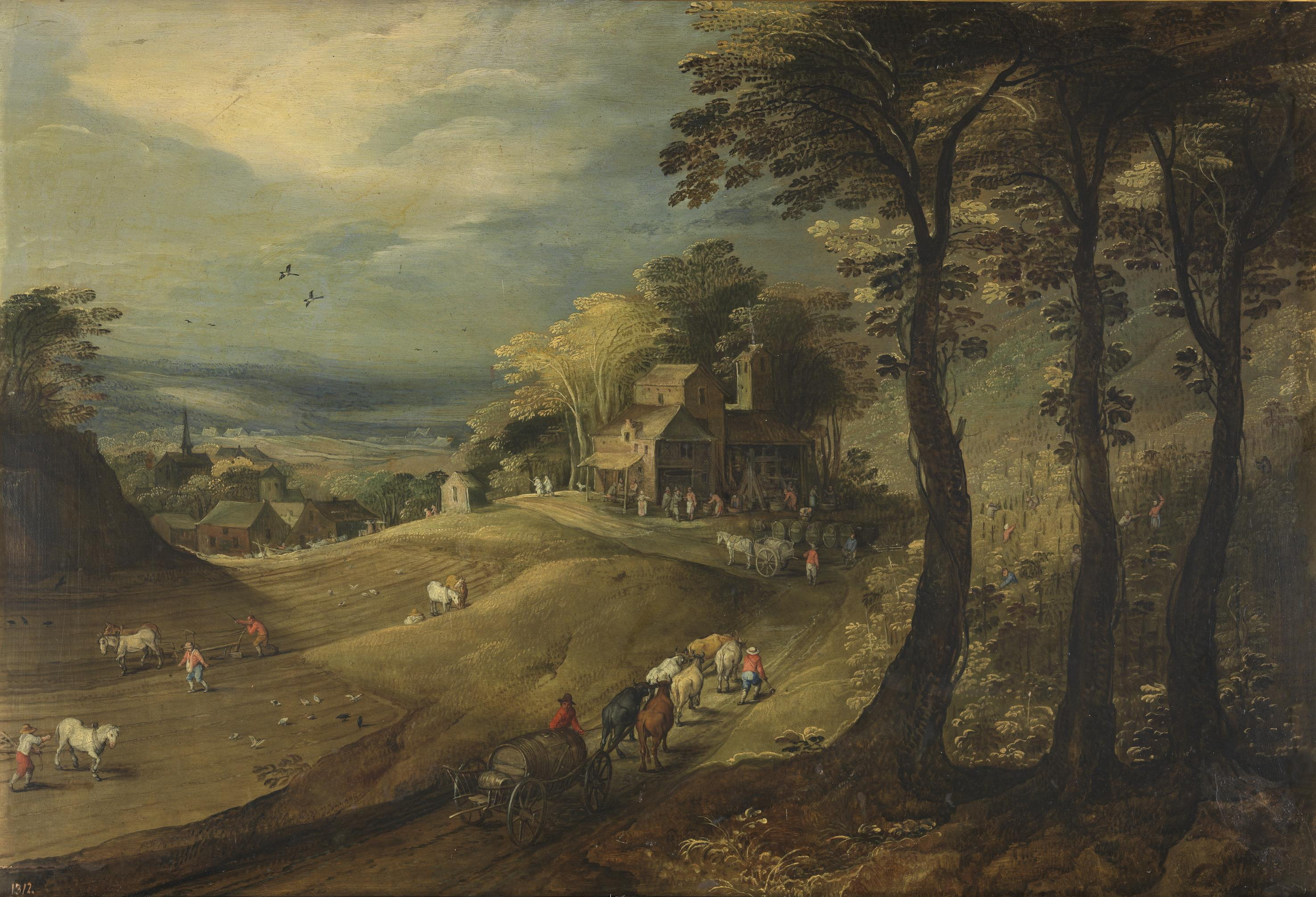
- Artist: Joos de Momper
- Year: Early 17th century
- Catalogue: P001590
- Medium: Oil on panel
- Dimensions: 42 cm × 68 cm (16.5 in × 26.8 in)
- Location: Museum of Prado, Madrid

A Farm (Spanish: Una granja) is an oil on panel painting by Flemish painter Joos de Momper.

The work has been credited as collaboration between de Momper and Jan Brueghel the Elder. The painting is kept in the Museum of Prado in Madrid.
