= Rocky Landscape with a Waterfall =

Painting by Joos de Momper

- Artist: Joos de Momper
- Year: Early 1610s
- Catalogue: ГЭ-441
- Medium: Oil on panel
- Dimensions: 56 cm × 82.5 cm (22 in × 32.5 in)
- Location: Hermitage Museum, Saint Petersburg

Rocky Landscape with a Waterfall (Russian: Скалистый пейзаж с водопадом) is an oil on panel painting by Flemish painter Joos de Momper. The painting was completed in the early 1610s, and currently housed at the Hermitage Museum in Saint Petersburg.

== Painting ==
The painting depicts de Momper's typical foreign, imaginary landscape. The colors become colder and the contours less distinct as they move to the background, where a valley crossed by a river sits. Looming out of the clouds, there is a barely distinct, bluish mountain peak. A hunter with several dogs and three horsemen are marching up a mountain road. To their right, two herdsmen tending to their cattle are sitting by a waterfall. The scene is fringed by the tall trees of a wooded slope to the left, and, to the right, by a crag whence the cascade is falling to the foreground. Jan Brueghel the Elder and Joos Momper collaborated on several occasions, with the latter always painting the landscape and the former often taking care of the staffage. In this instance, Brueghel painted the figures for de Momper.

== Provenance ==
The painting was part of Catherine the Great's collection. The empress was a patron of the arts, literature, and education. The Hermitage Museum, which now occupies the whole Winter Palace (once Catherine's residence), began as Catherine's personal collection. The empress was a lover of art and literature, and ordered the construction of the Hermitage in 1770 to house her expanding collection of sculpture, books, and painting, among which was Rocky Landscape with a Waterfall. By 1790, the Hermitage was home to 38,000 books, 10,000 gems and 10,000 drawings. As the painting was part of Catherine's collection, it may be claimed that it entered the Hermitage before 1797.

== Sources ==
- Natalʹi︠a︡ Ivanovna Grit︠s︡aĭ; Natalia Babina; Catherine Phillips (2008). State Hermitage Museum Catalogue Seventeenth- and Eighteenth-century Flemish Painting. Saint Petersburg: Hermitage Publishing House. ISBN 978-0-300-11686-1.
- Rounding, Virginia (2006). Catherine the Great: Love, Sex and Power. London: Hutchinson. ISBN 978-0-09-179992-2.
- Brechka, Frank (January 1969). "Catherine the Great: The Books She Read". The Journal of Library History. 4 (1): 39–52.
