= Mountainous Landscape with Figures and a Donkey =

Painting by Joos de Momper

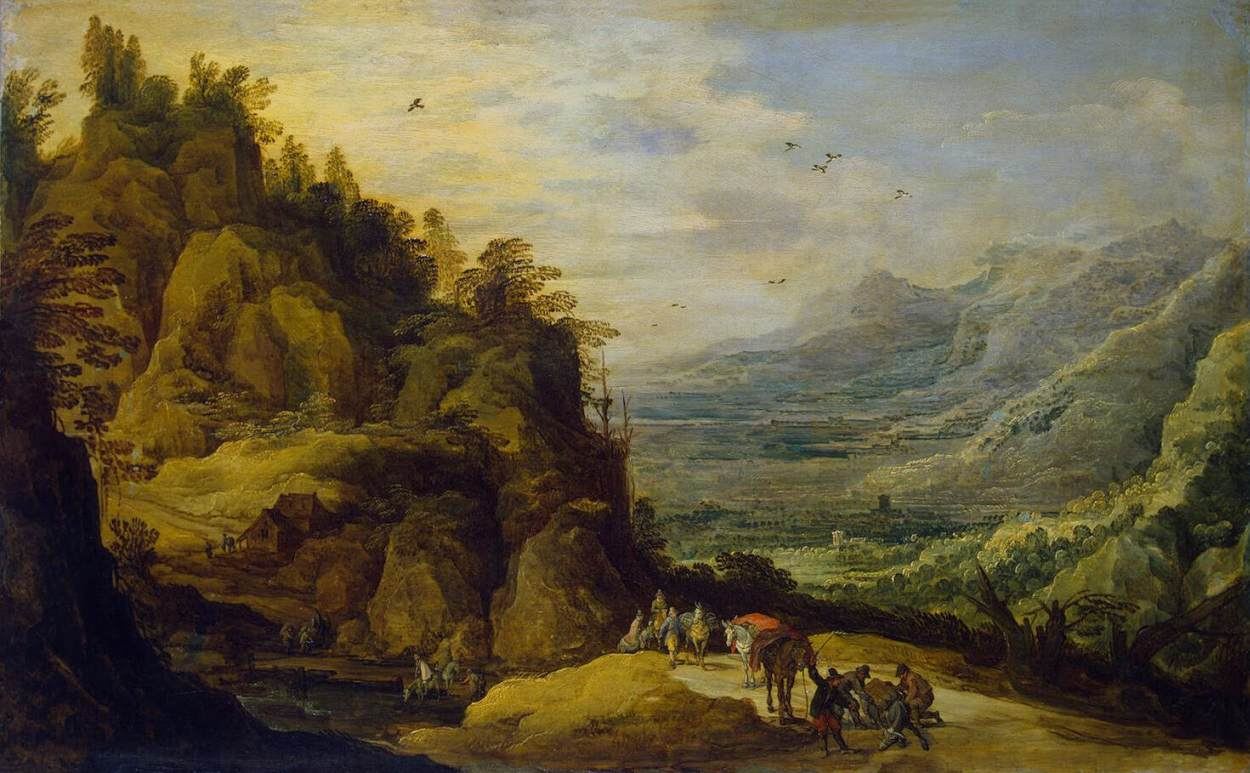
- Artist: Joos de Momper
- Year: Early 17th century
- Catalogue: ГЭ-448
- Medium: Oil on canvas
- Dimensions: 46 cm × 75 cm (18.1 in × 29.5 in)
- Location: Hermitage Museum; Saint Petersburg

Mountainous Landscape with Figures and a Donkey (Russian: Горный пейзаж с упавшим ослом) is an oil-on-canvas painting by Flemish painter Joos de Momper. It was painted in the early 17th century and is currently housed at the Hermitage Museum in Saint Petersburg.

== Painting ==
The painting was acquired by the Hermitage Museum in 1886. It was once part of the Golitsyn collection at the Golitsyn Museum, one of the first museums of Western European art to open in Russia in 1865.
