= Landscape with a View of the Sea at Sunset =

Painting by Joos de Momper

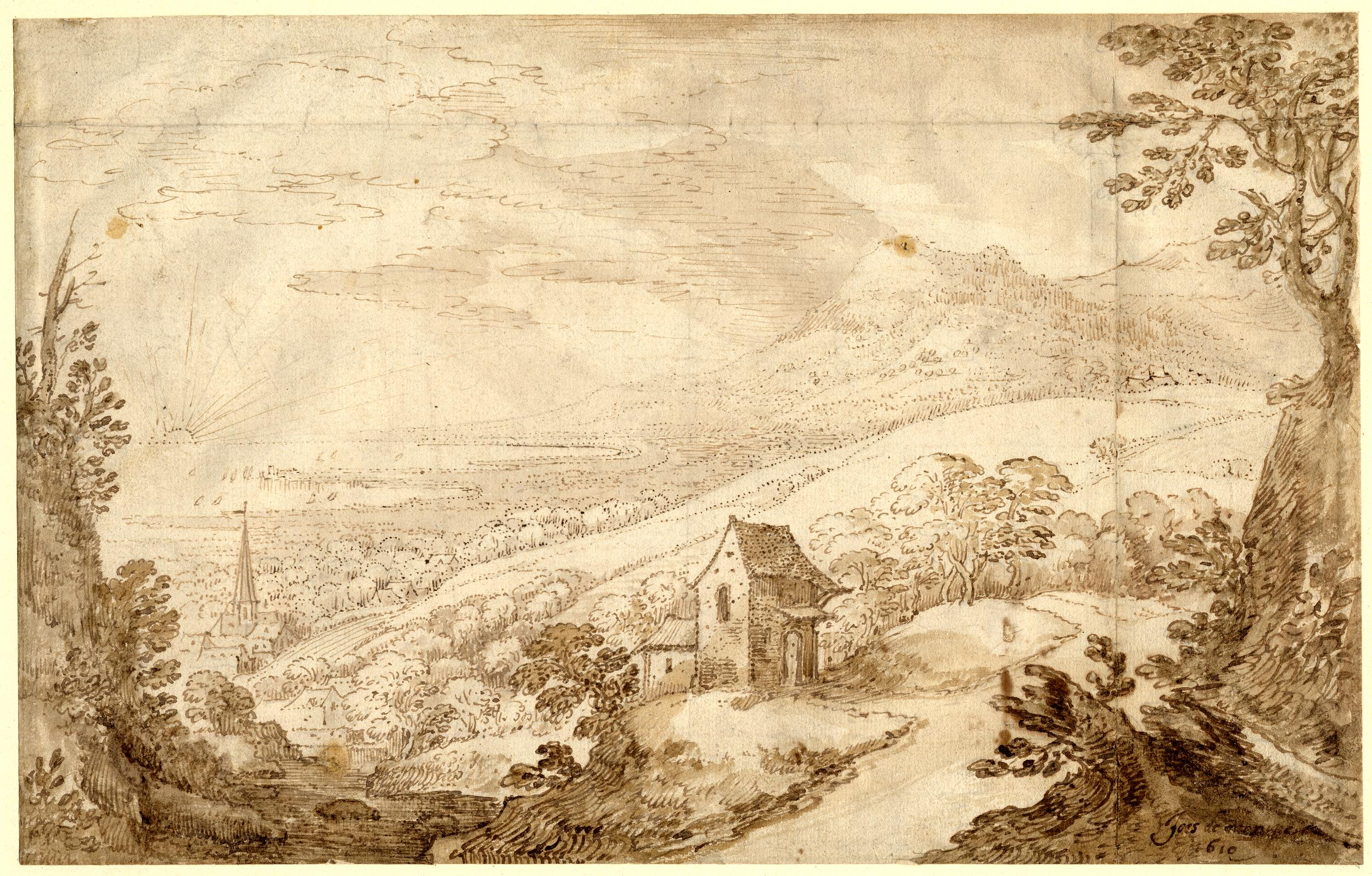
- Artist: Joos de Momper
- Year: ca. 1623
- Catalogue: Oo,9.48
- Medium: pen drawing with wash
- Dimensions: 22.3 cm × 35.4 cm (8.8 in × 13.9 in)
- Location: British Museum; London

Landscape with a View of the Sea at Sunset is a pen and ink wash drawing by Flemish painter Joos de Momper. It was painted in 1610, and is now in the British Museum in London. The drawing is valuable in that it is the only drawing signed and dated by de Momper.

The drawing shows a view of the sea with the setting sun. A bay with sailing boats and mountains are visible in the distance. The painting is bordered by two wooded flanks. To the right, close to the foreground, there sits a cottage facing a country road.

The painting was acquired by the British Museum in 1824.
