= Village at Full Moon =

Painting by Joos de Momper

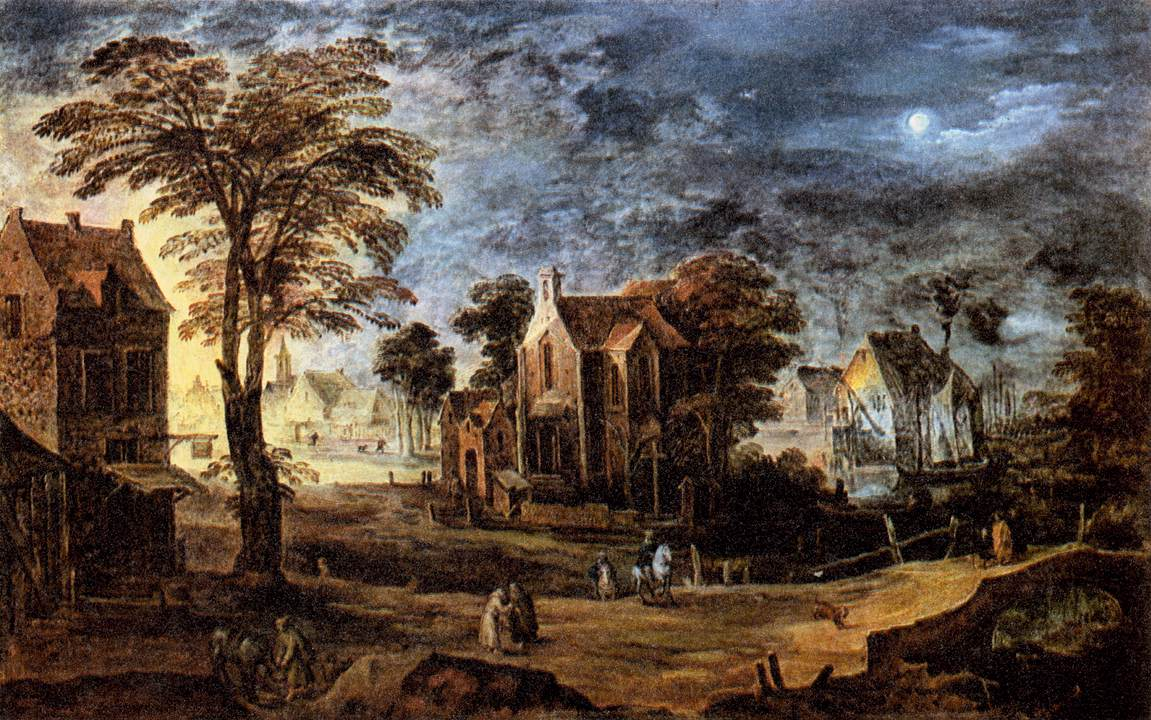
- Artist: Joos de Momper
- Year: 1620s
- Catalogue: O 36
- Medium: Tempera on panel
- Dimensions: 57 cm × 88 cm (22.4 in × 34.6 in)
- Location: National Gallery, Prague

Village at Full Moon (Czech: Vesnice za úplňku) is a tempera-on-panel painting by Flemish painter Joos de Momper. It was painted in the early 17th century, possibly in the 1620s, and is now in the National Gallery in Prague.

== Painting ==
The painting offers a view of a Flemish village under a full moon. The moon is shining on the town from an open spot in the cloudy sky. In the foreground, two horsemen trot their horses towards a bridge on the bottom right, which a family of three is crossing. A monk is feeding his donkey on the bottom left, while two other barefooted and bearded men talk closely to each other to his right. In this painting, Momper regulated the light so as to illuminate the scene from two points and different sources. From the right there pours in moonlight, while a fiery glow radiates on the other side.

The figures in the painting may have been realized by Jan Brueghel the Elder, a frequent collaborator of de Momper.
