= Mountain Landscape with Castle =

Painting by Joos de Momper

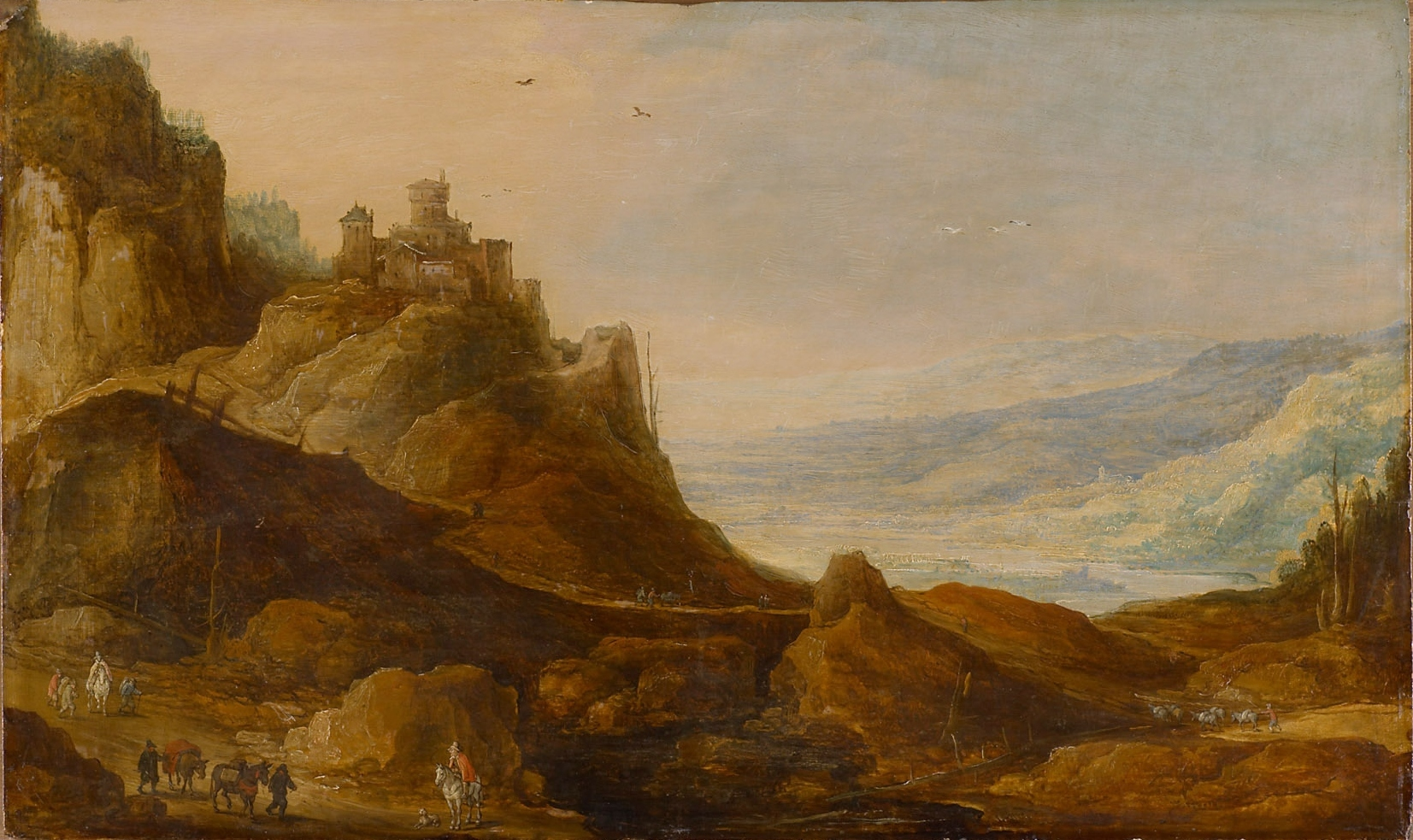
- Artist: Joos de Momper
- Year: 1600s
- Catalogue: 6967
- Medium: Oil on panel
- Dimensions: 45 cm × 74.8 cm (17.7 in × 29.4 in)
- Location: Kunsthistorisches Museum, Vienna

Mountain Landscape with Castle is an oil-on-panel painting by Flemish painter Joos de Momper. It was probably completed in the 1600s.

== Painting ==
The painting depicts the exotic, imaginary landscape typical of de Mompers' oeuvre and his circle. A warm-colored foreground gives way to a less warm background with bluish highlands seen from a distance. Several people are traveling up and down a winding path dug into a cliff, on top of which there sits a castle. In the foreground, there moves a group of travelers with two donkeys. Among them there are two horsemen, one of whose horses stands beside a dog. In his early work, de Momper often collaborated with Jan Brueghel the Elder, who generally painted staffage figures for him.

== Provenance of the painting ==
The painting became property of Arthur Seyss-Inquart, an Austrian Nazi leader responsible of crimes against the Dutchmen and humanity. The painting was acquired in 1942 by Dr. Schubert-Soldern, and became part of Vienna's Gemäldegalerie collection in 1942.
