= Summer Landscape with Harvesters =

Painting by Joos de Momper

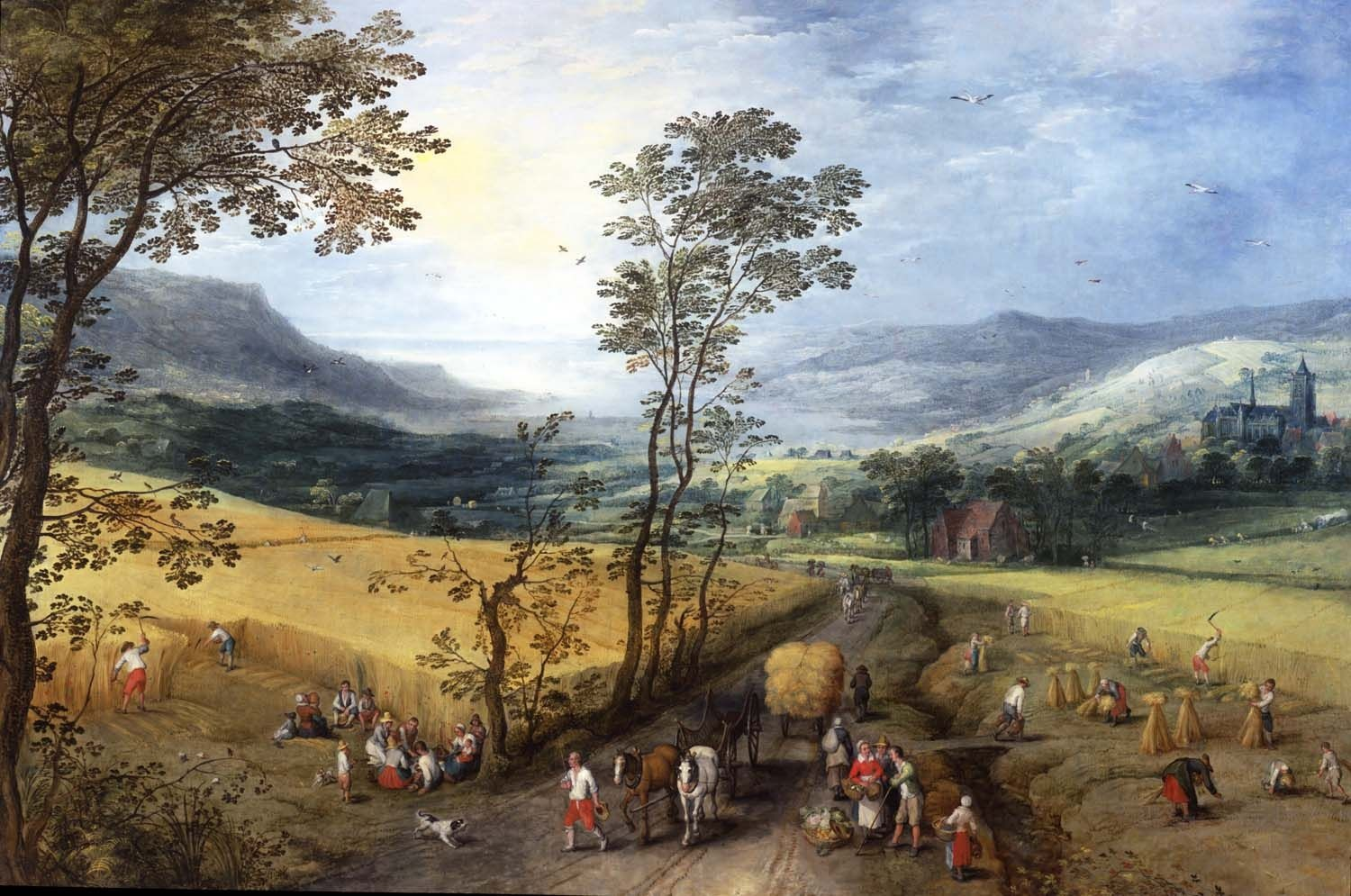
- Artist: Joos de Momper; Jan Brueghel the Elder
- Year: ca. 1610
- Catalogue: 2003.16
- Medium: Oil on canvas
- Dimensions: 166.4 cm × 65.5 cm (251.1 in × 98.8 in)
- Location: Toledo Museum of Art, Toledo, Ohio

Summer Landscape with Harvesters is an oil-on-canvas painting by Flemish artists Joos de Momper and Jan Brueghel the Elder. It was painted in the first quarter of the 17th century, probably around 1610, and is currently housed at the Museum of Art in Toledo, Ohio. After having been exposed in Toledo as an "anonymous loan", the Museum directory opted for the purchase, influenced by the reaction of the public. The painting was acquired by the Toledo Museum of Art in 2003.

Summer Landscape with Harvesters might be part of one of the series dedicated to the four seasons started by de Momper in 1615, of which Landscape with Skaters is part.

== Painting ==
The picture is an earthy depiction of nature and humanity, both at ease and engaged in physical exertion. Some people are working hard in the fields, others are having a picnic, others still are in the middle of a romantic encounter. Over seventy figures are depicted in the painting, and their activities reveal a cohesive and studied narrative. Some farmers are cutting off the grain, while others roll it into sheaves. Wagons are carrying the harvest to town, where it will be shipped to overseas markets, as indicated by the ships sailing in the faraway sea.

To the left, people are relaxing in the shade of the crop. They are eating food and drinking at a picnic. On the road, a dog greets a man walking up in front of his empty wagon to the viewer, and a woman sets the basket she is carrying on the ground, to rest a while on her way home.

The painting is a large vista of fields that recede to the background, giving way to a gulf and the ocean. By using a "mutually reinforcing geometry of diagonals that intersect with three distinct color bands [yellow, green, blue]," de Momper allowed his composition to "convincingly lead the eye deep into the picture."

Summer Landscape with Harvesters is considered one of many collaborations between de Momper of Jan Brueghel the Elder. The two collaborated on several occasions, with de Momper always painting the landscape and Brueghel taking care of the staffage, usually the animated figures.

== Provenance ==
The painting was acquired by the Toledo Museum of Art in March 2003 at a yearly old master fair in Maastricht. The painting previously was part of private collections in Spain, and was possibly part of the collection decorating the Torre de la Reina in the Alcázar de Madrid, which it arrived in Madrid from Flanders in the early 17th century.

== Bibliography ==
- Toledo Museum of Art, Toledo Museum of Art Masterworks, Toledo, 2009, p. 154-55, repr. (col.) and (det.).
- Brueghel Family: Jan Brueghel the Elder. The Brueghel Family Database. University of California, Berkeley, 2016
- Jan Brueghel der Ältere (1568-1625): Kritischer Katalog der Gemälde. Ertz Klaus, 2008–10, cat. #745
