= Mountainous Landscape with a Bridge and Four Horsemen =

Painting by Joos de Momper

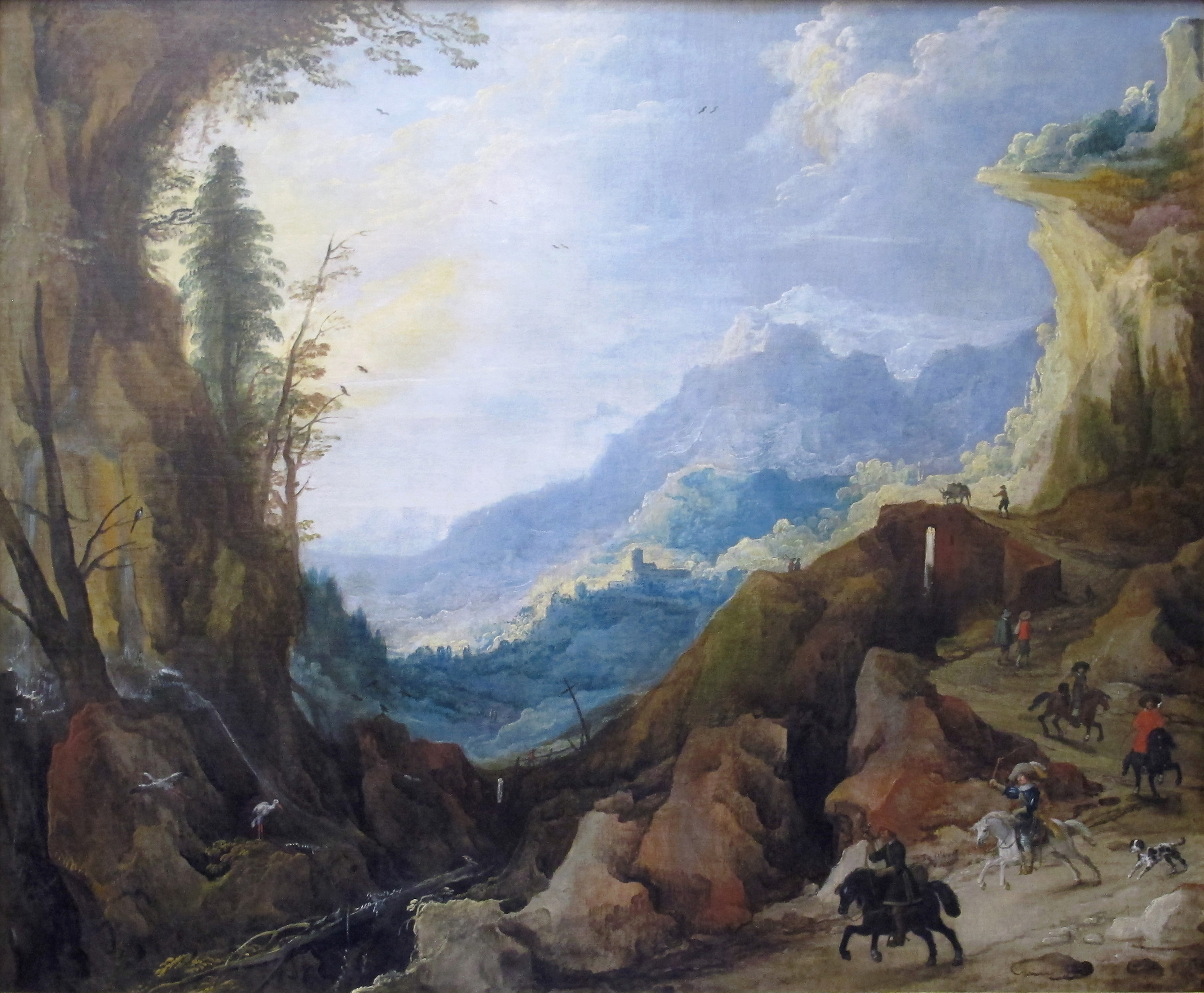
- Artist: Joos de Momper
- Year: 1579–1635
- Catalogue: INV 1104
- Medium: Oil on canvas
- Dimensions: 135 cm × 156 cm (53.1 in × 61.4 in)
- Location: Louvre; Paris

Mountainous Landscape with a Bridge and Four Horsemen (French: Paysage montagneux avec un pont et quatre cavaliers) is an oil painting on canvas by the Flemish landscapist Joos de Momper. Its date of execution is unknown. The painting is kept in the Louvre in Paris.

== Painting ==
The painting is in de Momper's typical style, and showcases the less realistic and more imaginary landscape art of his circle. Many Flemish landscapists painted in a more imaginary and apparently old-fashioned style to please the commissioners, as those kind of paintings sold for much higher prices.

In the background stands a mountain peak virtually melting into the sky. In the foreground, on bottom right, four horsemen and a dog are running from a bridge down a mountain trail. The leading horseman is blowing his horn.

The painting is part of a series housed at the Louvre, including two other paintings by de Momper. These paintings come from the French royal collection; they were probably part of the collection of Louis XIV (r. 1643 to 1715), although they are mentioned for the first time in the royal inventories from 1733. The painting was kept in Fontainebleau from 1840 until at least 1929.
