= Landscape (Jan Brueghel the Elder and de Momper) =

Painting by Joos de Momper

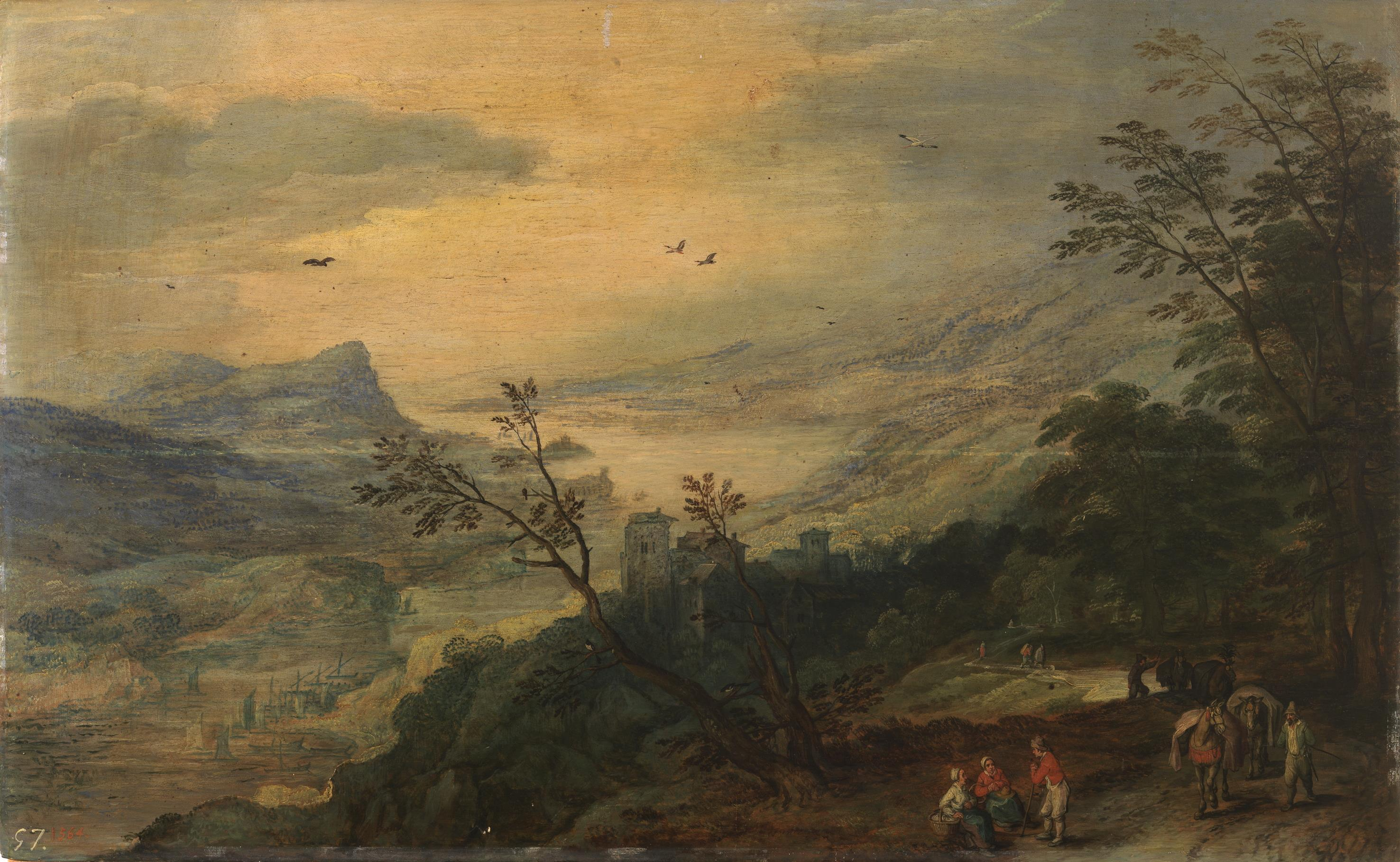
- Artists: Joos de Momper; Jan Brueghel the Elder
- Year: Early 17th century
- Catalogue: P001591
- Medium: Oil on panel
- Dimensions: 42 cm × 68 cm (16.5 in × 26.8 in)
- Location: Museum of Prado, Madrid

Landscape (Spanish: Paisaje) is an oil on panel painting by Flemish painter Joos de Momper.

The work is considered today a collaboration between de Momper and Jan Brueghel the Elder, and is currently housed at the Museum of Prado in Madrid.
