= Life in the Countryside =

Painting by Joos de Momper

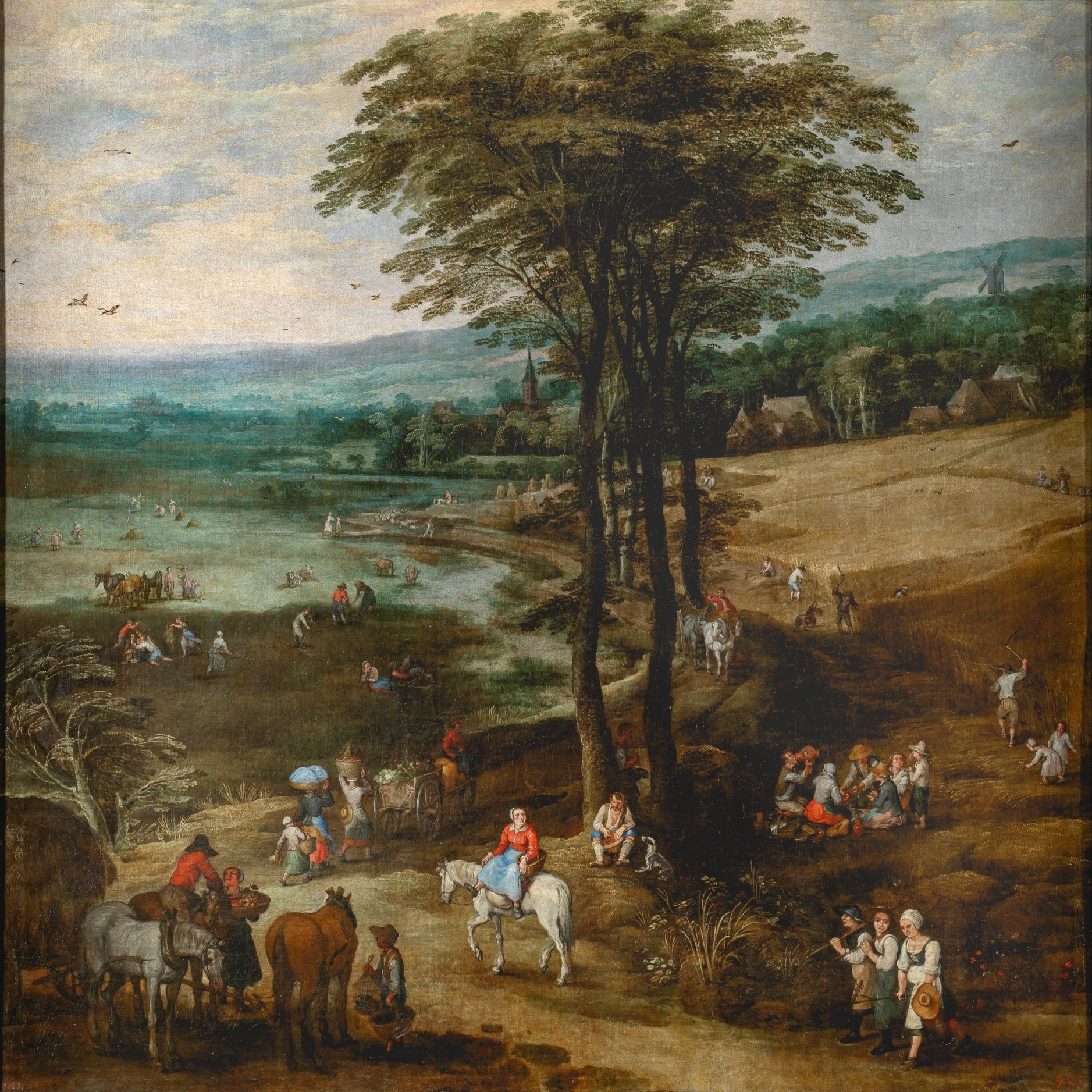
- Artists: Joos de Momper; Jan Brueghel the Elder
- Year: ca. 1620
- Catalogue: P001440
- Medium: Oil on canvas
- Dimensions: 166 cm × 168 cm (65.3 in × 66.1 in)
- Location: Museum of Prado, Madrid

Life in the Countryside (Spanish: La vida en el campo) is an oil on canvas painting by Flemish artists Jan Brueghel the Elder and Joos de Momper. It was painted between 1620 and 1622. The painting is kept in the Museum of Prado in Madrid.

== Painting ==
This painting is today considered a collaboration between Jan Brueghel the Elder and Joos de Momper. The latter would have painted the landscape, the former the figures, as is customary in paintings considered collaborations of the two.

The large trees in midsection split the composition in two, and are "the vertical counterpoint to the horizontal perspective that is projected in the distance." The painting shows the influence of Brueghel the Elder on his own son and de Momper in many ways, notably, in the scenic choice and the representation of figures.
