= Landscape with Skaters =

Painting by Joos de Momper

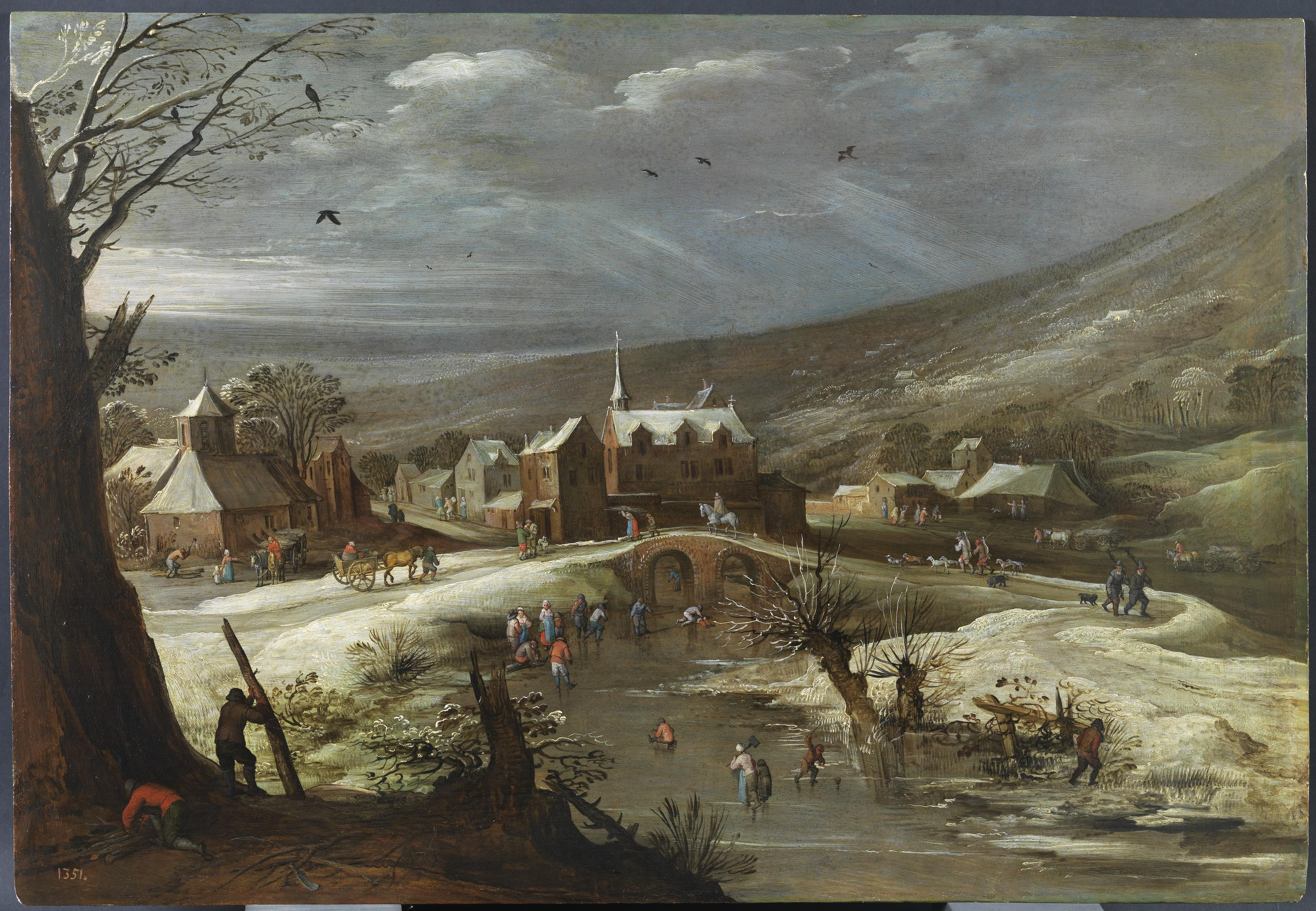
- Artist: Joos de Momper
- Year: ca. 1620
- Catalogue: P001588
- Medium: Oil on canvas
- Dimensions: 166 cm × 168 cm (65.3 in × 66.1 in)
- Location: Museo del Prado, Madrid

Landscape with Skater (Spanish: Paisaje con patinadores) is an oil on canvas painting by Flemish artist Joos de Momper. The painting is today considered a collaboration between the latter and Jan Brueghel the Elder. It was painted between 1615 and 1625. The painting is kept in the Museum of Prado in Madrid.

== Painting ==
The painting depicts a group of villagers engaged in common activities on a winter day. The landscape is clearly in the style of de Momper. The sky is leaden. Some villagers are at work, others are skating over a frozen canal.

The perspective is elevated, and the central building in the painting functions as the axis for the houses' distribution in the depicted village. The horizon line is high in the background, where a hilly landscape is depicted. In the foreground, there are the frozen canal with the skaters and a snowy road ending into the right bottom end of the painting.

The painting is part of a series treating the four seasons started by de Momper in 1615. The influence of Brueghel the Elder is therefore clear. However, de Momper didn't use allegory and symbolism. He limited himself to the representation of the landscape. The figures in the painting have been attributed to Jan Brueghel the Elder.

== Bibliography ==
- Salas, Xavier de, Museo del Prado. Catálogo de las pinturas, Museo del Prado, Madrid, 1972, pp. 431.
- Díaz Padrón, Matías, Museo del Prado: catálogo de pinturas. Escuela flamenca, Museo del Prado; Patrimonio Nacional de Museos, Madrid, 1975.
- Díaz Padrón, Matías, La Escuela Flamenca del Siglo XVII, Ediciones Alfiz, Madrid, 1983, pp. 67.
- Museo Nacional del Prado, Museo del Prado. Catálogo de las pinturas, Museo del Prado, Madrid, 1985, pp. 431.
- Barghahn, Barbara Von, Philip IV and the Golden House of the Buen Retiro in the Tradition of Caesar, Garland PublishingInc, Nueva York. Londres, 1986, pp. 369/ lám.1286.
- Museo Nacional del Prado, Museo del Prado: inventario general de pinturas (I) La Colección Real, Museo del Prado, Espasa-Calpe, Madrid, 1990, pp. nº1351.
- Ayala Mallory, Nina, La pintura flamenca del siglo XVII, Alianza editorial, Madrid, 1995, pp. 89/ lám.69.
- Díaz Padrón, Matías, El siglo de Rubens en el Museo del Prado: catálogo razonado, Prensa Ibérica, Barcelona, 1996, pp. 754.
- Posada Kubissa, Teresa, El paisaje nórdico en el Prado. Rubens, Brueghel, Lorena, Museo Nacional del Prado, Madrid, 2011, pp. 100,161, n. 32.
- Posada Kubissa, Teresa, Rubens, Brueghel, Lorrain. A Paisagem Nórdica do Museu do Prado, Museu Nacional de Arte Antiga - INCM - Museo Nacional del Prado, Lisboa, 2013, pp. 98,157 n.32.
- Mena Marques, M.B, 'Las cuatro Estaciones. Invierno' En:, Mena Marques, Manuela B. Goya en Madrid : cartones para tapices 1775-1794, Museo Nacional del Prado, Madrid, 2014, pp. 273–283 [274 f.7.36].
- Martínez Leiva, Gloria. Rodríguez Rebollo, Angel, El inventario del Alcázar de Madrid de 1666. Felipe IV y su colección artística., Consejo Superior de Investigaciones Científicas, Madrid, 2015, pp. 351 nº 339.
