= Dune Landscape with Travelers and Cattle =

Painting by Joos de Momper

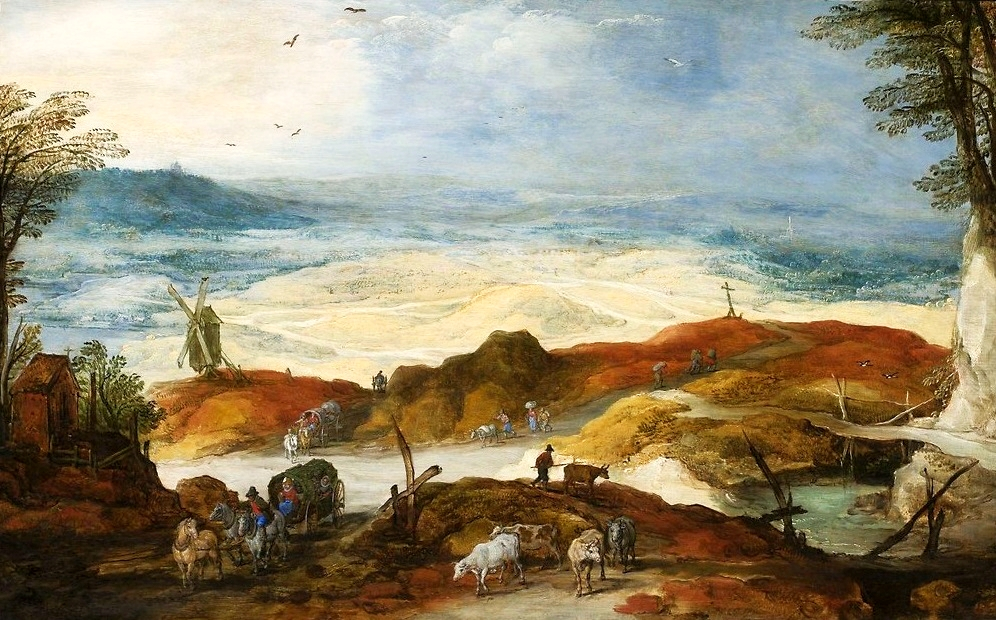
- Artist: Joos de Momper
- Year: 1600s
- Catalogue: M.Ob. 377
- Medium: Oil on panel
- Dimensions: 53 cm × 83 cm (20.8 in × 32.6 in)
- Location: National Museum, Warsaw

Mountainous Landscape with Figures and a Donkey (Polish: Krajobraz piaszczysty) is an oil-on-panel painting by Flemish painter Joos de Momper. It was completed in the early 17th century. The painting is currently housed at the National Museum in Warsaw, which acquired it in 1917.

== Sources ==
- Antoni Ziemba (2007). Malarstwo flamandzkie doby Rubensa, Van Dycka i Jordaensa : 1608-1678. Warszawa: Przedsiębiorstwo Wydawnicze Rzeczpospolita SA : Muzeum Narodowe. ISBN 978-83-60192-33-7.
- Jan Białostocki (1963). The National Museum in Warsaw Handbook of the Collections. Warsaw: Muzeum Narodowe w Warszawie. pp. 12–30.
- Jan Białostocki, Maria Murdzeńska, Danuta Książkiewicz, Jan Kuglin (1969). Catalogue of paintings: foreign schools. Vol. 1. National Museum in Warsaw, cat. no. 833, p. 280
