= Landscape with Sea and Mountains =

Painting by Joos de Momper

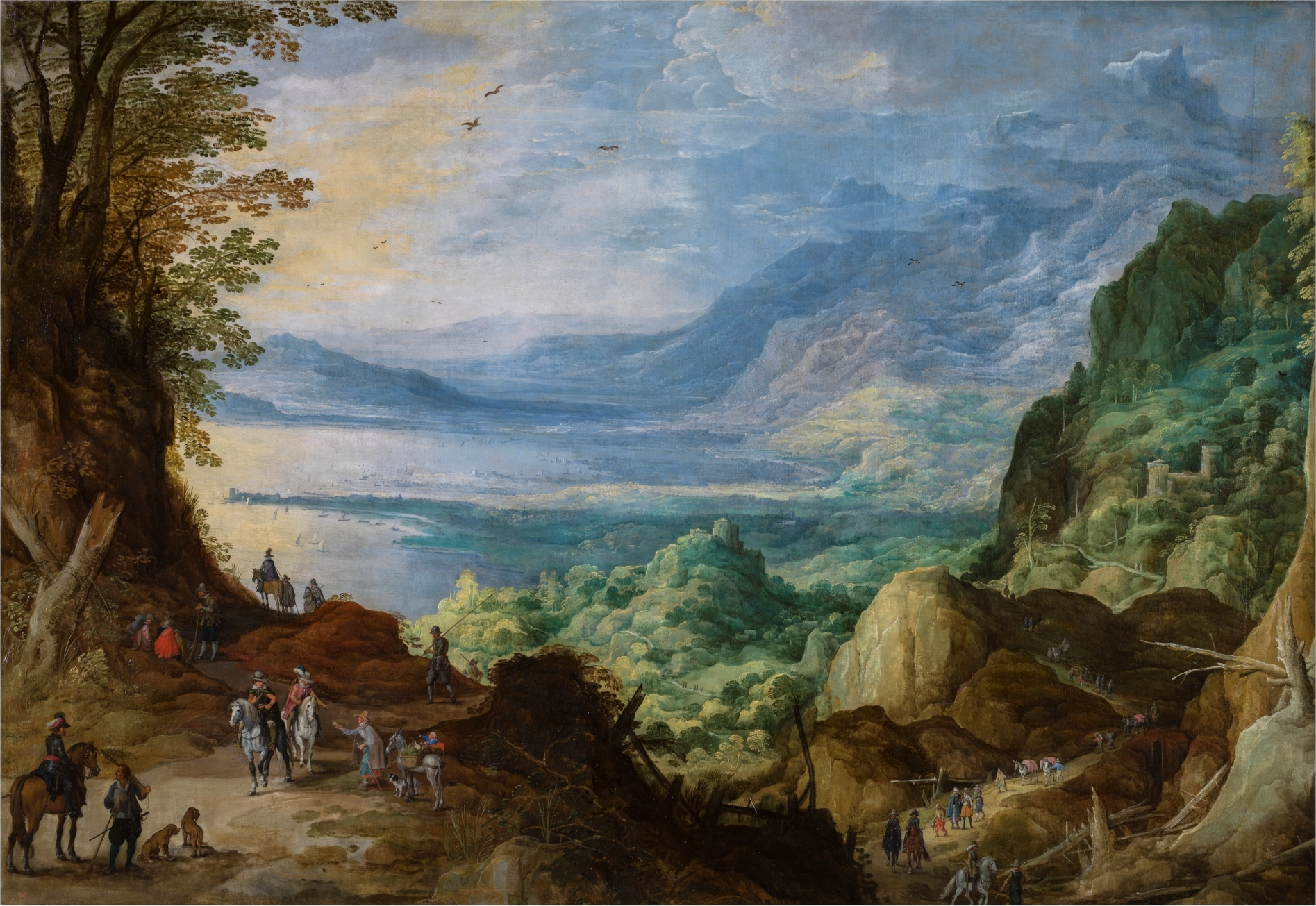
- Artist: Joos de Momper
- Year: ca. 1623
- Catalogue: P001592
- Medium: Oil on canvas
- Dimensions: 174 cm × 256 cm (68.5 in × 100.8 in)
- Location: Museum of Prado, Madrid

Landscape with Sea and Mountain is an oil-on-canvas painting by Flemish painter Joos de Momper. It was painted in the early 1620s, and is now in the Museum of Prado in Madrid.

== Painting ==
De Momper produced paintings that contained and highlighted both landscape and ordinary people engaged in common activities to varying degrees. He had some stock models which he repeated throughout his oeuvre. Such models were popular among the Flemings at the time. One of them entailed the depiction of a large landscape with some reduced figures in the foreground, carrying out everyday activities. In this painting, de Momper portrayed hunters, beggars and riders.

In the background, there is an extensive view of the mountains melding into the ocean, with a view of a gulf. The painting shows the imaginative work of the Flemish artist. Flanders is a quite flat land. Momper was part of a group of Baroque Flemish landscapists who painted larger, more fantastical and seemingly old-fashioned views than other landcapists. These always featured mountainous topography and exotic lands. Rather than the more realistic landscapists being innovators, it was painters like de Momper who painted more imaginary landscapes (which were paid more) to please the sophisticated tastes of patrons and art collectors.

In this painting, the influence of Pieter Bruegel the Elder is perceivable in many ways—notably, the high horizon.

This painting has been part of the Spanish Royal Collection since at least the beginning of the 18th century. In 1700, it was housed at the Buen Retiro Palace in Madrid. Today, it is in the Museum of Prado in the same city.

== Bibliography ==
- Cohen, Walter, Der landschaftsmaler Joost de Momper, BRUCKMANNS PANTHEON: INTERNATIONALE JAHRESZEITSCHRIFT FUR KUNST, 7/8, 1931, pp. 60.
- Salas, Xavier de, Museo del Prado. Catálogo de las pinturas, Museo del Prado, Madrid, 1972, pp. 432.
- Díaz Padrón, Matías, Museo del Prado: catálogo de pinturas. Escuela flamenca, Museo del Prado; Patrimonio Nacional de Museos, Madrid, 1975.
- Trafalgar Galleries at the Grand Palais, Paris. Old Master P, B.Cohen and Sons, Londres, 1978, pp. 28,29.
- Díaz Padrón, Matías, La Escuela Flamenca del Siglo XVII, Ediciones Alfiz, Madrid, 1983, pp. 68.
- Ertz, Klaus, Josse de Momper Der Jungere. 1564-1635. Die Gemalde Mit Krit, Luca, 1986, pp. 24, 27, 84, 304, 484, nº79.
- Barghahn, Barbara Von, Philip IV and the Golden House of the Buen Retiro in the Tradition of Caesar, Garland PublishingInc, Nueva York. Londres, 1986, pp. 298/ lám.1114.
- Museo Nacional del Prado, Museo del Prado: inventario general de pinturas, I, Museo del Prado, Espasa-Calpe, Madrid, 1990, pp. nº1602.
- Sutton, Peter C., The Age of Rubens, Museum of Fine Arts, 1993, pp. 457–458.
- Díaz Padrón, Matías, El siglo de Rubens en el Museo del Prado: catálogo razonado, Prensa Ibérica, Barcelona, 1996, pp. 758.
- Posada Kubissa, Teresa, El paisaje nórdico en el Prado: Rubens, Brueghel, Lorena, Museo Nacional del Prado, 2011, pp. 31–33,156 / 2.
- Posada Kubissa, Teresa, Rubens, Brueghel, Lorrain. A Paisagem Nórdica do Museu do Prado, Museu Nacional de Arte Antiga - INCM - Museo Nacional del Prado, Lisboa, 2013, pp. 30–32,153 n.2.
