= Mountain Landscape (de Momper, Kunsthistorisches) =

Painting by Joos de Momper

- Artist: Joos de Momper
- Year: 1620—1630
- Catalogue: 644
- Medium: Oil on canvas
- Dimensions: 209 cm × 286 cm (82 2/8 in × 112.6 in)
- Location: Kunsthistorisches Museum; Vienna

Mountain Landscape (German language: Große Gebirgslandschaft) is a large oil-on-canvas painting by Flemish painter Joos de Momper. The painting was probably completed in the 1620s and is currently housed at the Kunsthistorisches Museum in Vienna.

== Painting ==
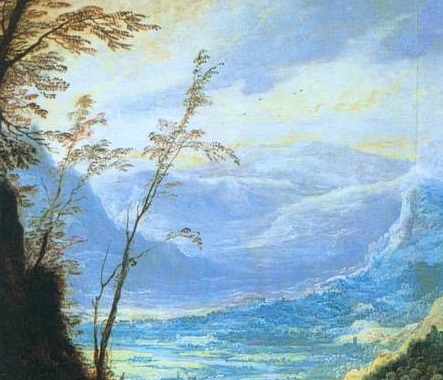
Glimpse of dale and mountains in the distance

The painting shows the typical fantastic landscape painted by de Momper. Momper was part of an imaginary trend carried on by Flemish artists who painted exotic and mountainous views in an imaginative and apparently old fashioned style, which was less realistic than that of many other 17th-century painters.

Paintings of this kind were not executed in this fashion due to a lack of skills or understanding of unified space, light effects or low horizon; rather, they were produced thusly to suit the more experienced and sophisticated tastes of collectors who "valued the inventiveness and refinement of the 'imaginary' landscapes." This kind of paintings generally cost much more. The Große Gebirgslandschaft is closed to the right by a wooded cliff, from around which the viewer is given a glimpse of a dale, which recedes into a distant massif. A trail winds down into the valley from the foreground. Several people are travelling up and down the path. In the foreground, a group of travelers including a horseman and a dog are marching up the mountain trail. The latter figures have been attributed to Hans III Jordaens, who reportedly painted the staffage for this painting.

== Provenance of the painting ==
The painting was part of Archduke Leopold Wilhelm of Austria collection. Leopold was regent of the Netherlands from 1647 to 1656. Thanks to the 1648 Civil War in England and the several art collections that came into the market because of that, he was able to acquire a large number of valuable paintings in that period. He purchased masterpieces of both Early Netherlandish art and contemporary Flemish art from Antwerp and Brussels, as well as the Italian paintings from the collections of Buckingham and Hamilton. The Archduke amassed about 1400 paintings, including the Large Mountain Landscape, which he then bequeathed to his son Leopold I, Holy Roman Emperor. The painting and the other artwork from Leopold's collection are today housed at the Kunsthistorisches Museum in Vienna.
