= Large Mountain Landscape =

Painting by Joos de Momper

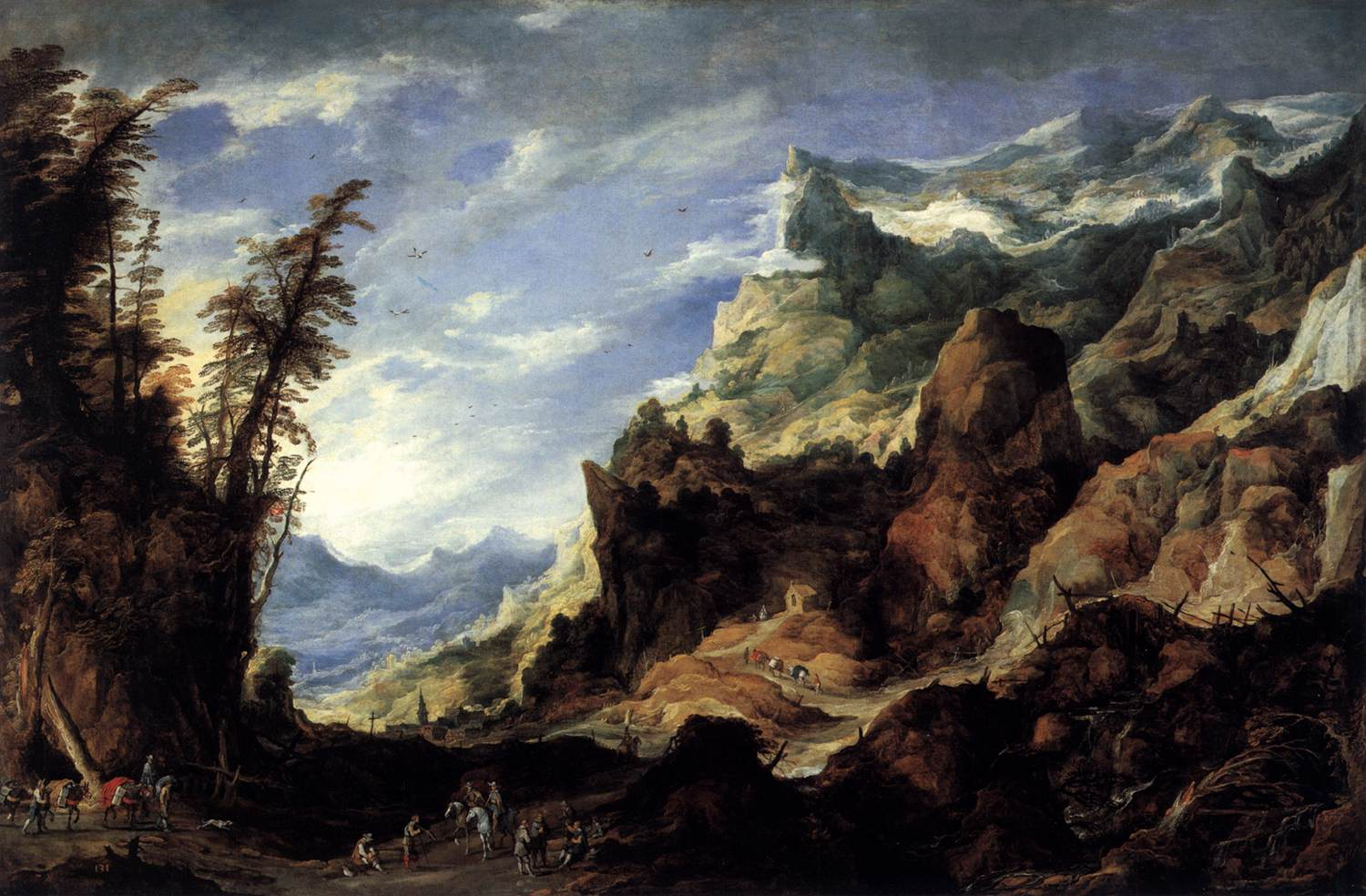
- Artist: Joos de Momper
- Year: c. 1620
- Catalogue: GE730
- Medium: Oil on canvas
- Dimensions: 226 cm × 327 cm (88 9/7 in × 128.7 in)
- Location: Liechtenstein Museum; Vienna

Large Mountain Landscape is a large oil-on-canvas painting by Flemish painter Joos de Momper. The painting was completed in the early 17th century. It is currently part of the private collection of the Liechtenstein Museum in Vienna.

== Painting ==
The Large Mountain Landscape was probably painted in the early 17th century, possibly in the 1620s. De Momper reportedly was particularly active in the 1620s, a period when he expanded his repertory. Most of de Momper's paintings feature a mountainous topography and evince a more imaginative approach to landscape painting compared to other 17th-century landscapists.

The viewer stands on a high vantage point. In the foreground, there are a group of horsemen and walking travelers halting in the shade of a cliff. On the path, some people come, some people go. They travel a trail with wooded, steep cliffs on either side. The people travelling on the winding path, falling back to the background, emphasize the sense of dimension.

The staffage of small figures in the large painting is at variance with the large rock formations. To the right, the cliff grows into a peak shrouded by clouds. The contrast between staffage and huge natural features may symbolize the sway of nature over man. However, here, as in every other painting by de Momper, nature is the product of the Fleming's imagination working upon distant memories. Issues of "statics and tectonics" are not addressed here, and indeed the painting adheres to the imaginative landscape painting style of de Momper and his circle.
