= Mountain Landscape with Campers and a Broken Tree =

Painting by Joos de Momper

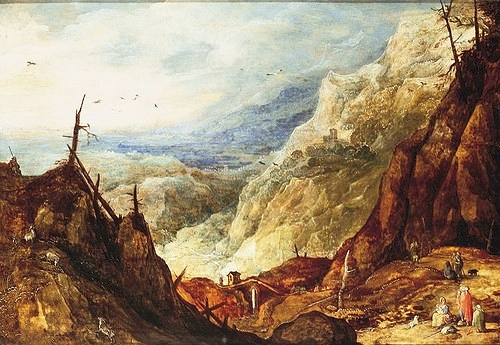
- Artist: Joos de Momper
- Year: Early 17th century
- Catalogue: M.Ob.821
- Medium: Oil on panel
- Dimensions: 45.7 cm × 65 cm (17.9 in × 25.5 in)
- Location: National Museum, Warsaw

Mountain Landscape with Campers and a Broken Tree (Polish: Krajobraz górski) is an oil-on-panel painting by Flemish painter Joos de Momper. The painting is currently housed at the National Museum in Warsaw.

The painting was completed in the early 17th century. It was transferred to the National Museum in Warsaw in 1946.

== Sources ==
- Antoni Ziemba (2007). Malarstwo flamandzkie doby Rubensa, Van Dycka i Jordaensa : 1608-1678. Warszawa: Przedsiębiorstwo Wydawnicze Rzeczpospolita SA : Muzeum Narodowe. ISBN 978-83-60192-33-7.
- Jan Białostocki (1963). The National Museum in Warsaw Handbook of the Collections. Warsaw: Muzeum Narodowe w Warszawie. pp. 12–30.
- Jan Białostocki, Maria Murdzeńska, Danuta Książkiewicz, Jan Kuglin (1969). Catalogue of paintings: foreign schools. Vol. 1. National Museum in Warsaw, cat. no. 833, p. 280
