= Mountain Landscape with Pilgrims in a Grotto Chapel =

Painting by Joos de Momper

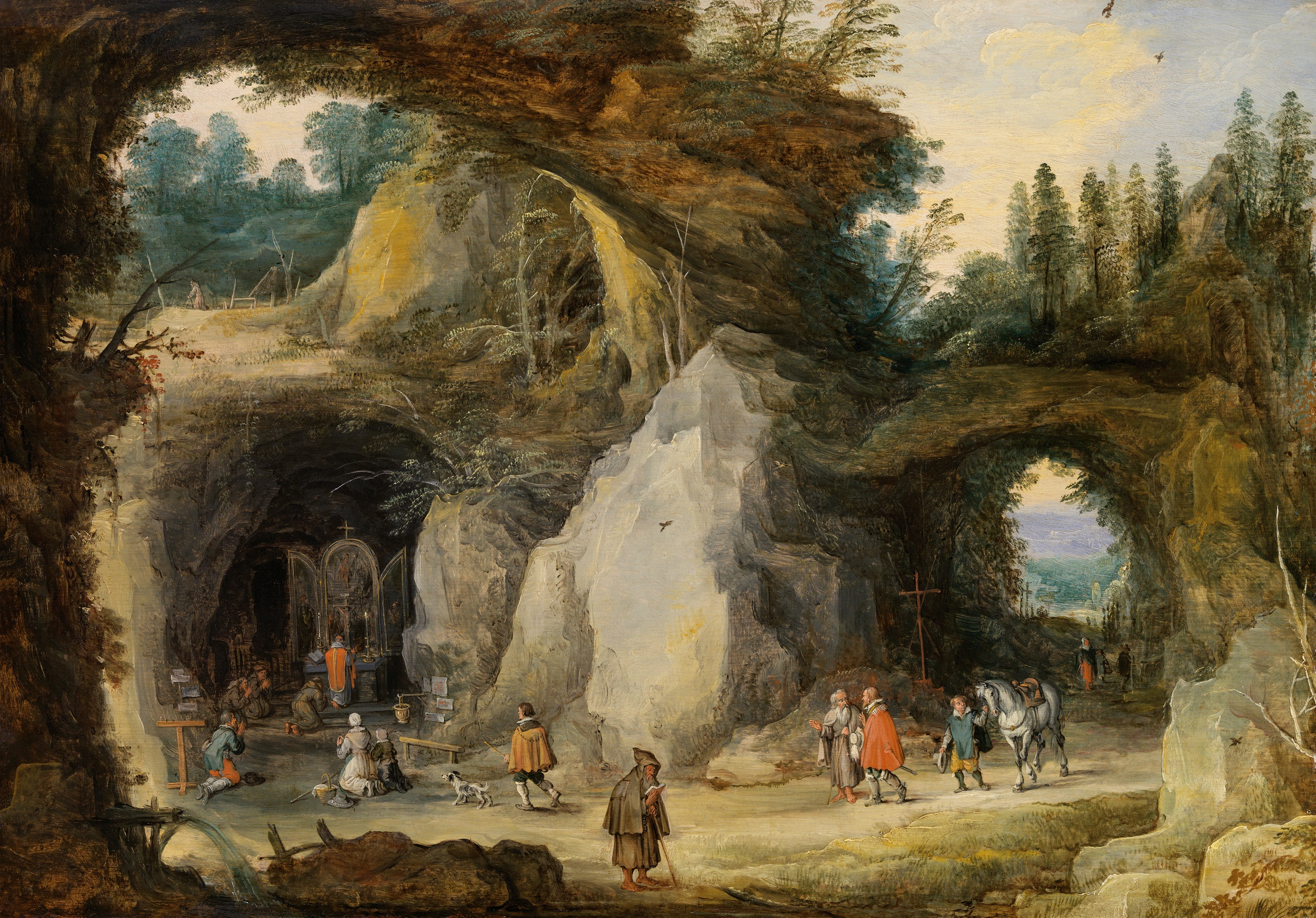
- Artists: Joos de Momper; Jan Brueghel the Elder
- Year: c. 1616
- Catalogue: HB-60
- Medium: Oil on panel
- Dimensions: 56 cm × 80 cm (22 in × 31.4 in)
- Location: Liechtenstein Museum, Vienna

Mountain Landscape with Pilgrims in a Grotto Chapel, also known as A Hermit before a Grotto, is an oil on panel painting by Flemish painters Joos de Momper and Jan Brueghel the Elder. The painting was completed at some time between 1610 and 1626. It is currently part of the private collection of the Liechtenstein Museum in Vienna.

== Painting ==
Mountain Landscape with Pilgrims in a Grotto Chapel was completed in the early 17th century, possibly in 1616.

The focal point of the painting is its grotto motif. Grottoes were one of the recurrent themes in Flemish landscape painting. Many paintings by de Momper which feature a grotto have survived to this day. De Momper's grotto-landscape paintings derive from the trend popularized by Cornelis van Dalem.

His grottoes provide a retreat for herdsmen, monks and saints, or serve as meeting places for Greek mythological characters. In this case, the grotto serves as a haven for pilgrims, who gather there to stay awhile and offer prayers.

De Momper often collaborated with other artists for the realization of staffage figures, notably Jan Brueghel the Elder. In this painting the staffage was painted by Jan Brueghel the Elder.
