= Flemish Market and Washing Place =

Painting by Joos de Momper

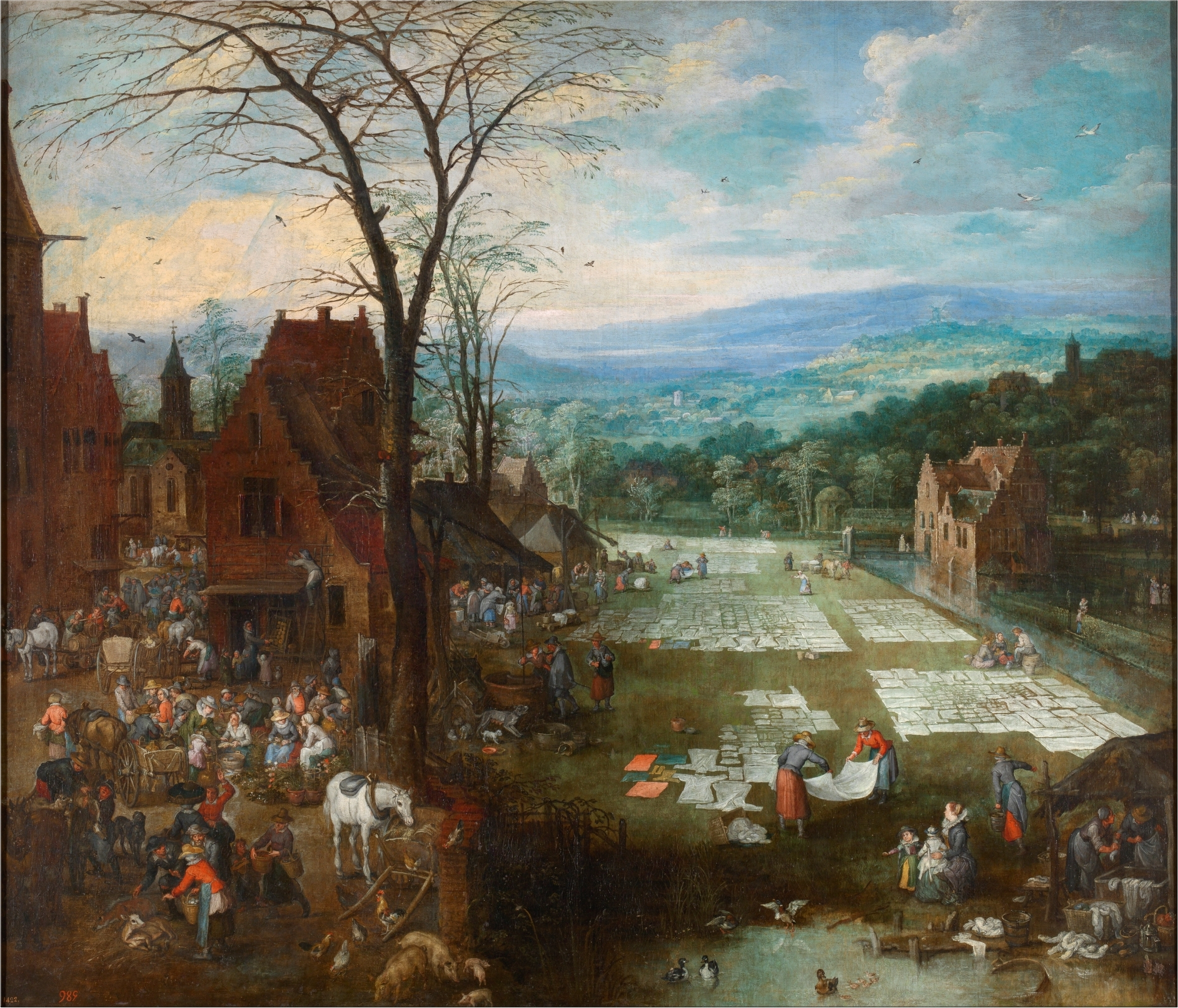
- Artist: Joos de Momper
- Year: ca. 1620
- Catalogue: P001443
- Medium: Oil on canvas
- Dimensions: 166 cm × 194 cm (65.3 in × 76.3 in)
- Location: Museum of Prado; Madrid

Flemish Market and Washing Place is an oil-on-canvas painting by Flemish painter Joos de Momper. It was painted in the 1620s, and it might be a collaboration between de Momper and Jan Brueghel the Elder

== Painting ==
The painting is a blend of landscape painting and genre painting. It shows a scene of rural life typical of Flanders. The people are spreading cloth on a bleachfield, an open area used for spreading woven fabrics on the ground, in order to purify and whiten them by the action of the sunlight.

Bleachfields were also common in northern England, whereto the Flemings migrated in large numbers throughout the medieval and early modern periods; for instance, the name of the town of Whitefield, on the outskirts of Manchester, is thought to derive from the medieval bleachfields used by Flemish settlers.

To the left, the painting depicts a bustling town market. There is a pleasant contrast between the animated, hectic market and the placid bleachfield; as well as between the former and the elevated sky.

The painting is currently housed at the Museum of Prado, in Madrid. It has been part of the Royal Collection since at least the early 18th century, when it was housed at the Zarzuela Palace.
