= Minerva's Visit to the Muses =

Painting by Joos de Momper

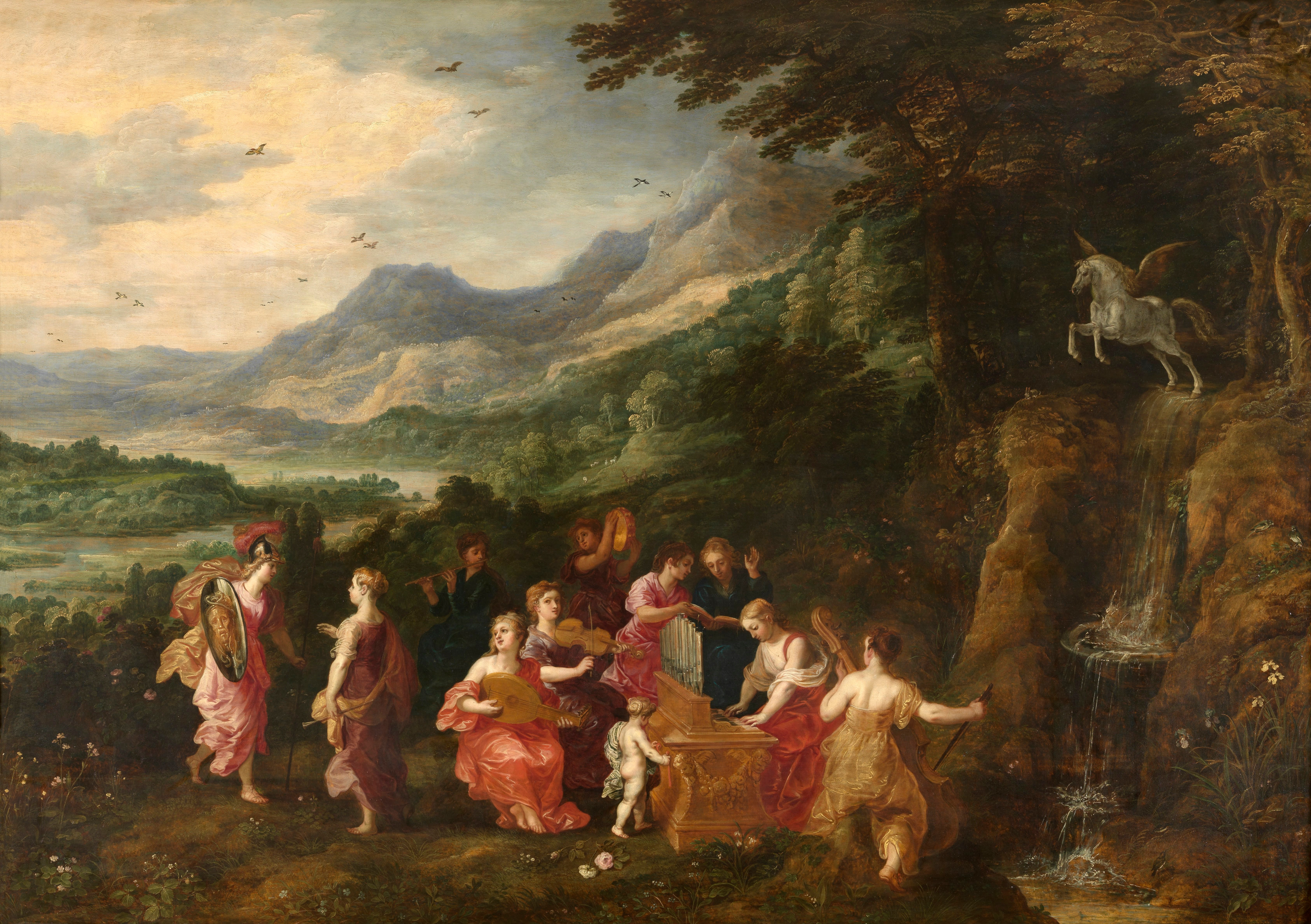
- Artist: Joos de Momper
- Year: Late 16th century or early 17th century
- Medium: Oil on panel
- Dimensions: 140 cm × 55.1 cm (199 in × 78.3 in)
- Location: Royal Museum of Fine Arts; Antwerp

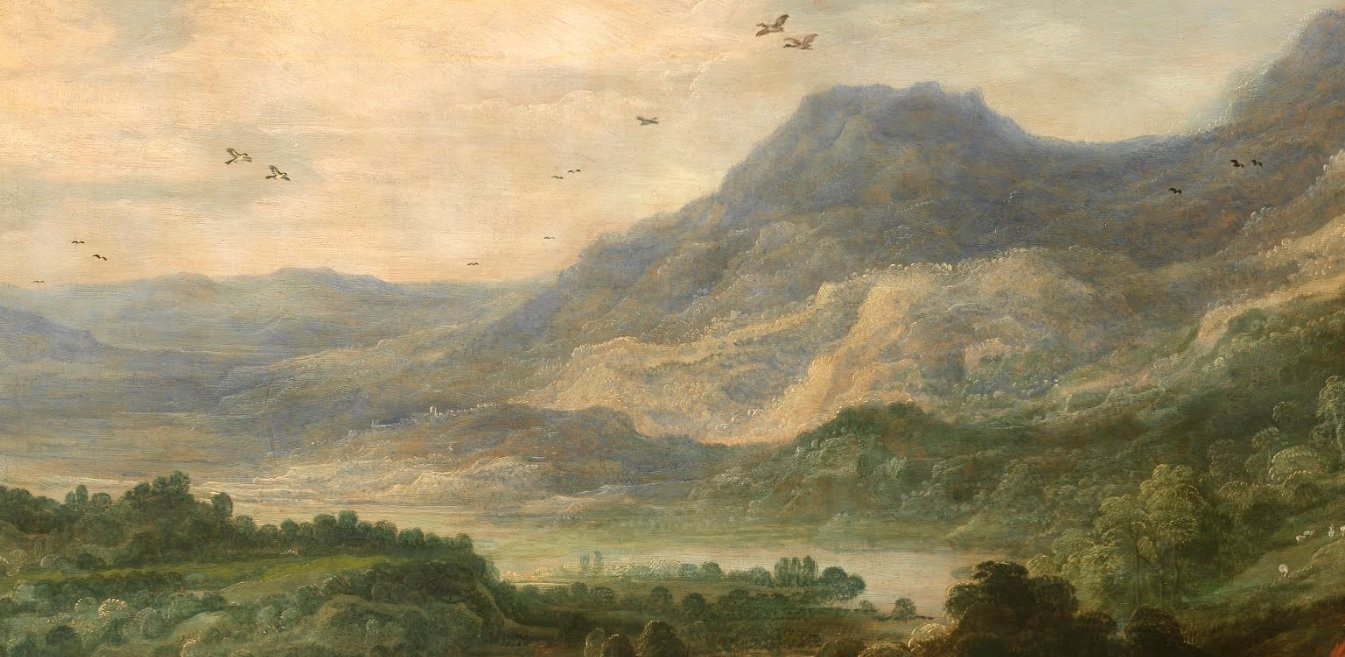
Pallas, after she had long admired that fountain, flowing where the hoof had struck, turned round to view the groves of ancient trees; the grottoes and the grass bespangled

Minerva's Visit to the Muses is an oil-on-oak-panel painting by Flemish painter Joos de Momper. The painting depicts a scene from Ovid's Metamorphoses, which tells of Minerva visiting the muses on Mount Helicon, to listen to their song and see the Hippocrene. In the painting, the scene takes place in a wooded mountain side. At the same time, a pastel, distant landscape is depicted in the background. The painting is currently housed at the Royal Museum of Fine Arts in Antwerp.

== Subject ==
In his metamorphoses, Ovid recounts:

Through all these mighty deeds
Pallas, Minerva, had availed to guide
her gold-begotten brother. Now she sped,
surrounded in a cloud, from Seriphus,
while Cynthus on the right, and Gyarus
far faded from her view. And where a path,
high over the deep sea, leads the near way,
she winged the air for Thebes, and Helicon
haunt of the Virgin Nine.
High on that mount
she stayed her flight, and with these words bespoke
those well-taught sisters; "Fame has given to me
the knowledge of a new-made fountain—gift
of Pegasus, that fleet steed, from the blood
of dread Medusa sprung—it opened when
his hard hoof struck the ground.—It is the cause
that brought me.—For my longing to have seen
this fount, miraculous and wonderful,
grows not the less in that myself did see
the swift steed, nascent from maternal blood."
[...] Pallas, after she had long admired
that fountain, flowing where the hoof had struck,
turned round to view the groves of ancient trees;
the grottoes and the grass bespangled, rich
with flowers unnumbered—all so beautiful
she deemed the charm of that locality
a fair surrounding for the studious days
of those Mnemonian Maids.

== Painting ==
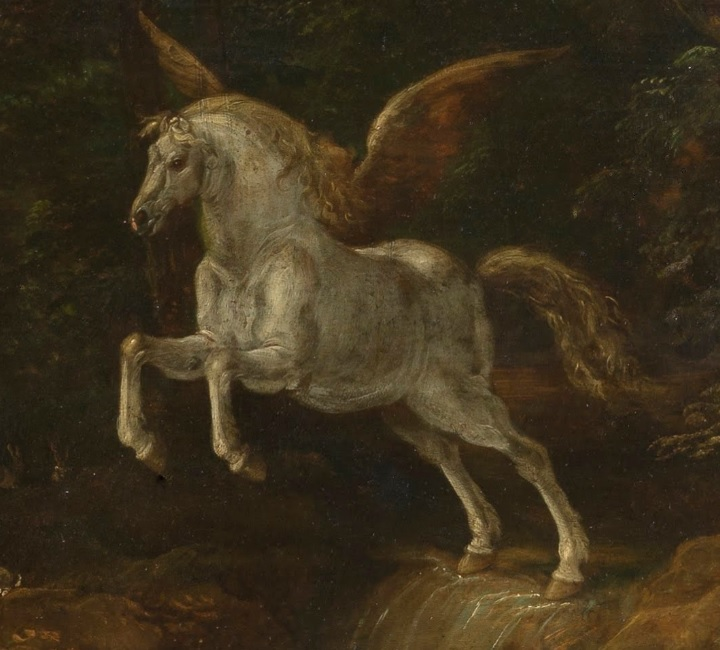
"Fame has given to me the knowledge of a new-made fountain, opened when [Pegasus'] hard hoof struck the ground. It is the cause that brought me."

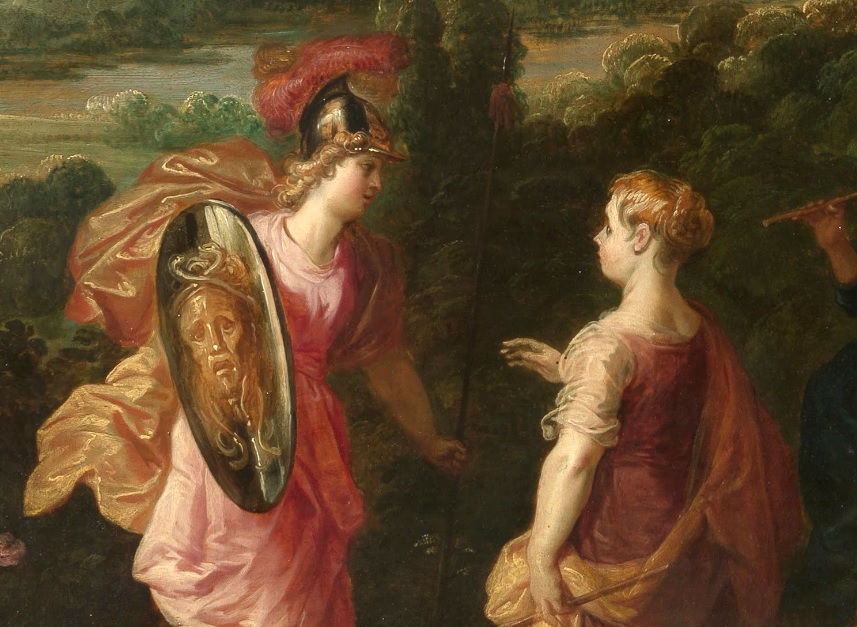
"A new-made fountain, gift of Pegasus, that fleet steed, from the blood of dread Medusa sprung"

Ovid tells about Minerva's visit to the muses on Mount Helicon. The goddess went there to listen to the muses' songs and behold Hippocrene, which sprung from a rock after Pegasus hit it with his hooves. In the painting, several muses are playing music in a wooded mountain side overlooking a dale. Pegasus is seen in the background on the top right corner. On the opposite corner, there walks in Minerva, with Medusa depicted on her shield.

As mentioned by Ovid, according to tradition, Pegasus and his brother Chrysaor sprang from the blood issuing from Medusa's neck as Perseus was beheading her.

The way in which Pegasus was born is similar to the manner in which Athena was born from the head of Zeus. After beheading her, Perseus used Medusa's head, which retained its ability to turn onlookers to stone, as a weapon, and then gave it to Athena (Minerva) who placed it on her shield.

In the painting, Minerva's association with the muses jibes with the former's identification as sponsor of the arts. A.P. de Mirimonde postulated that the work represents Minerva's visit to the Muses. The scene does not take place on the Parnassus, but on the Helicon, as evinced in the Hippocrene, "Horse's Fountain", stemming from beneath Pegasus's hooves.

The painting's landscape was realized by de Momper, while Hendrik van Balen painted the figures, and Jan Brueghel the Elder painted the flowers. In the painting, the foreground gradually merges into the background. The latter's harmonious landscape jibes with the cheerful mood of the Greek mythological characters painted in the foreground.
