= Landscape with the Temptation of Christ =

Painting by Joos de Momper

Mountain Landscape with the Temptation of Christ
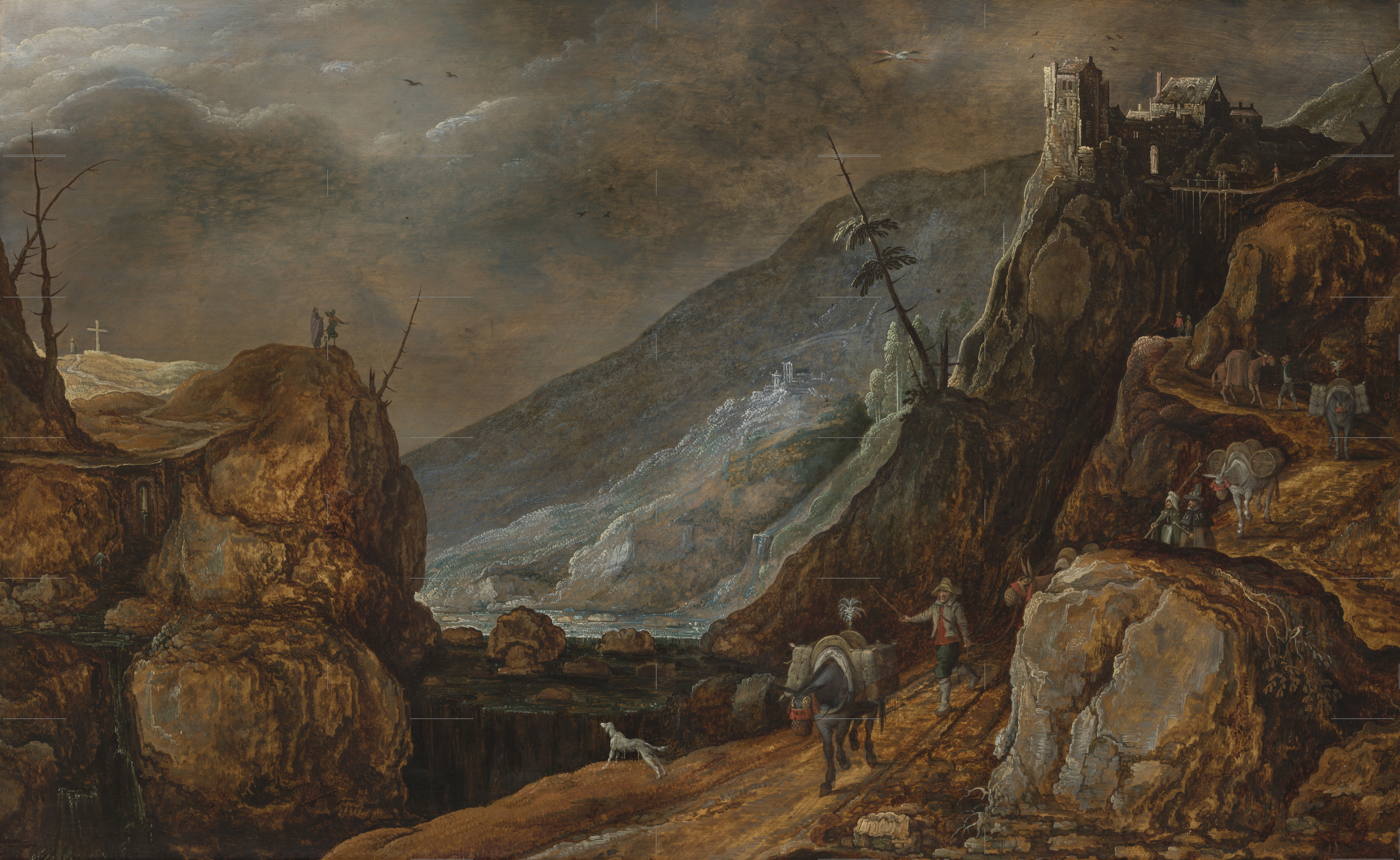
- Artist: Joos de Momper and Sebastiaen Vrancx
- Year: 1600s
- Catalogue: DO 4188
- Medium: Oil on panel
- Dimensions: 51 cm × 82.5 cm (20 in × 32.6 in)
- Location: National Gallery, Prague

Mountain Landscape with the Temptation of Christ is an oil-on-oak-panel painting by the Flemish painters Joos de Momper who painted the landscape and Sebastiaen Vrancx who painted the figures. The painting is now in the National Gallery in Prague.

== Painting ==
De Momper's landscape style closely relates to the type of landscape painting popular in Flanders since the middle of the 16th century. De Momper is representative of a group of painters who favored a rather imaginary representation of landscapes. This group of painters favored foreign views and alpine topography.

In this painting, the image is seen from a slant view, and framed by high mountain massifs. The latter descend on both sides to the valley wherein a river is flowing. The scenery, as well, is reminiscent of the works of de Momper's predecessors. In the background, barely seen, there is the New Testament scene of the Temptation of Christ. A donkey tilts its head towards it, while a dog is firmly pointing to the two figures. The travelling people keep on marching untroubled down the mountain path.
