= Landscape with the Fall of Icarus (de Momper) =

Painting by Joos de Momper

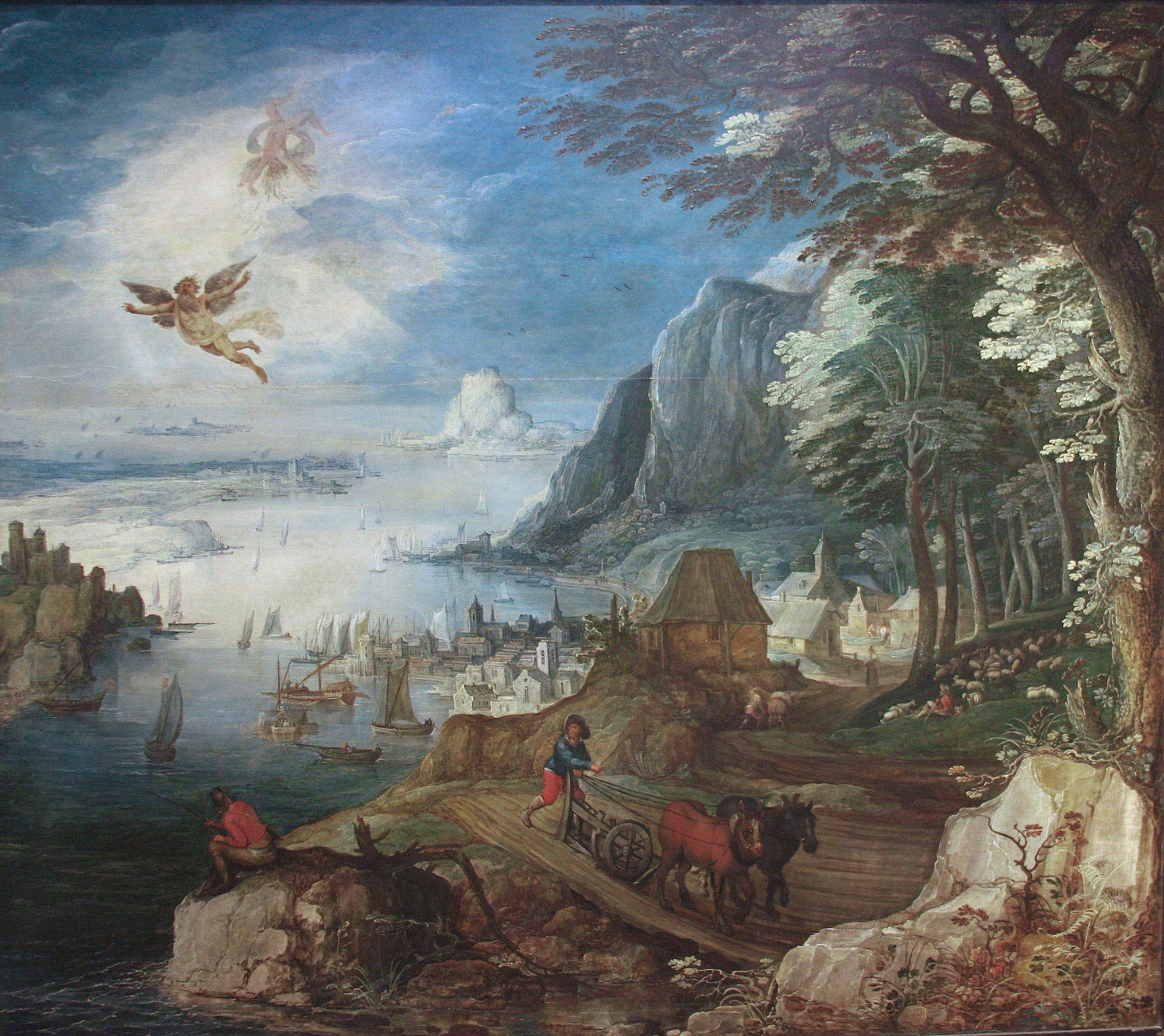
- Artist: Joos de Momper
- Year: 1620s
- Catalogue: NM 731
- Medium: Oil on canvas
- Dimensions: 154 cm × 173 cm (60.6 in × 68.1 in)
- Location: Nationalmuseum, Stockholm

Landscape with the Fall of Icarus is an oil-on-canvas painting by the Flemish painter Joos de Momper. It was possibly painted in the 1620s, and is currently housed at the Nationalmuseum in Stockholm.

== Subject ==
In Greek mythology, Icarus succeeded in flying, while attempting to escape from Crete, with wings made by his father Daedalus, using feathers secured with beeswax. Dedalus asked Icarus to fly neither too low nor too high, warning him against hubris. Ignoring his father's warnings, Icarus chose to fly too close to the sun, melting the wax. He fell into the sea and drowned.

== Painting ==
To the left, several ships are sailing, coasting steep cliffs. Tall and leafy trees frame the painting to the right; a seaside town stretches in the middle, overhung by fabulous cliffs, which are typical of de Momper and his group of Flemish landscapists.

In the trees' shadow there sits a shepherd, tending to his flock. There is a fisherman to the left, and a ploughman on their right. These three figures (ploughman, shepherd and angler) are mentioned in Ovid's account of the legend. In the Roman poet's version, they are: "astonished and think to see gods approaching them through the aether." In contrast to this, there is a Flemish proverb that goes "And the farmer continued to plough..." (En de boer ... hij ploegde voort) pointing out the ignorance of people to fellow men's suffering. The painting was inspired by Bruegel's painting of the same name. In de Momper's version, too, the three figures appear to pay no attention to flying men, mistakable for gods. As regards Bruegel's painting, it has been suggested by W. H. Auden in his 1938 poem, that it depicts humankind's indifference to suffering by highlighting the ordinary events which continue to occur, despite the unobserved death of Icarus.

The painting was taken to Stockholm as booty in 1648.
