= Landscape with a Mountain Pass =

Painting by Joos de Momper

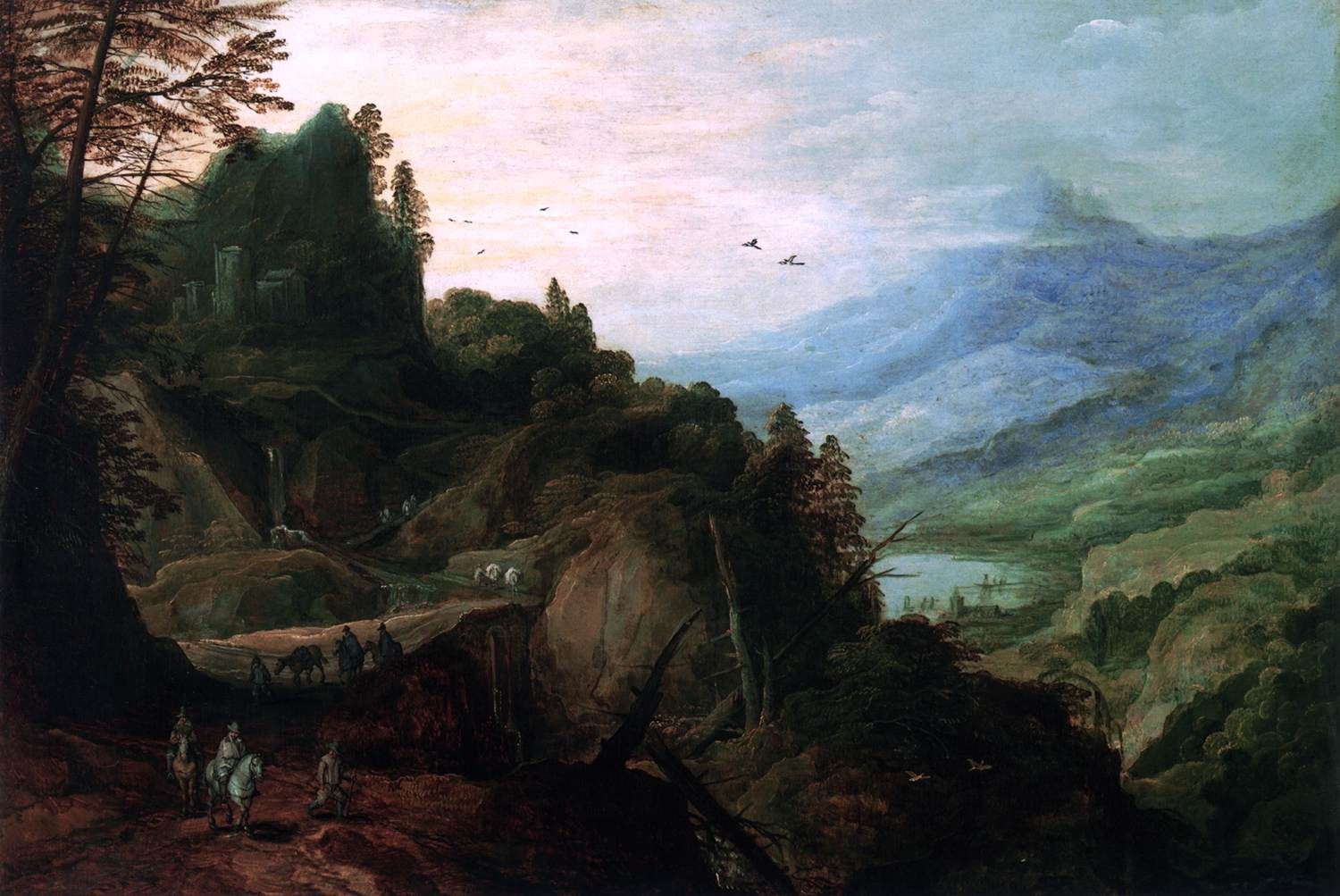
- Artist: Joos de Momper
- Year: c. 1620
- Catalogue: GE1789
- Medium: Oil on panel
- Dimensions: 45 cm × 66 cm (17.7 in × 25 9/8 in)
- Location: Liechtenstein Museum, Vienna

Landscape with a Mountain Pass is a large oil-on-canvas painting by Flemish painter Joos de Momper. It was completed sometime between 1600 and 1625. The painting was acquired by Prince Karl Eusebius von Liechtenstein from the art dealer Peter Bousin between 1674 and 1680, and is currently part of the private collection of the Liechtenstein Museum in Vienna.

== Painting ==
Mountains are a staple in the imaginative landscape compositions of de Momper, and this painting is no exception. In this work, a winding path, upon which separate groups of horsemen are travelling, descends to the viewer. The painting has a unnaturally strong contrast between light and dark. Tones become ever lighter and cooler as they progress to the background, where bluish, misty mountains are discernible in the distance. It has been suggested that de Momper's landscape painting was influenced by his alleged travels to Italy, where he reportedly drew sketches of the Alps.

De Momper's landscape paintings are more like "memories than empirical records". The huge mountains and cliffs, the "unexpected vistas into endless space" and "the picturesque play of light and atmosphere" were his main concerns. Momper worked upon his memories with his imagination, and adjusted the product thereof to the style set by Brueghel and Patinir.

== Dating ==
While de Momper's works are almost never signed nor dated, they can be ordered into groups according to the style assumed by the Flemish in a given period. Landscape with a Mountain Pass displays the artist's mature abilities, and may be dated to between 1615 and 1625.
