= Joos de Momper =

Flemish painter

Joos de Momper the Younger
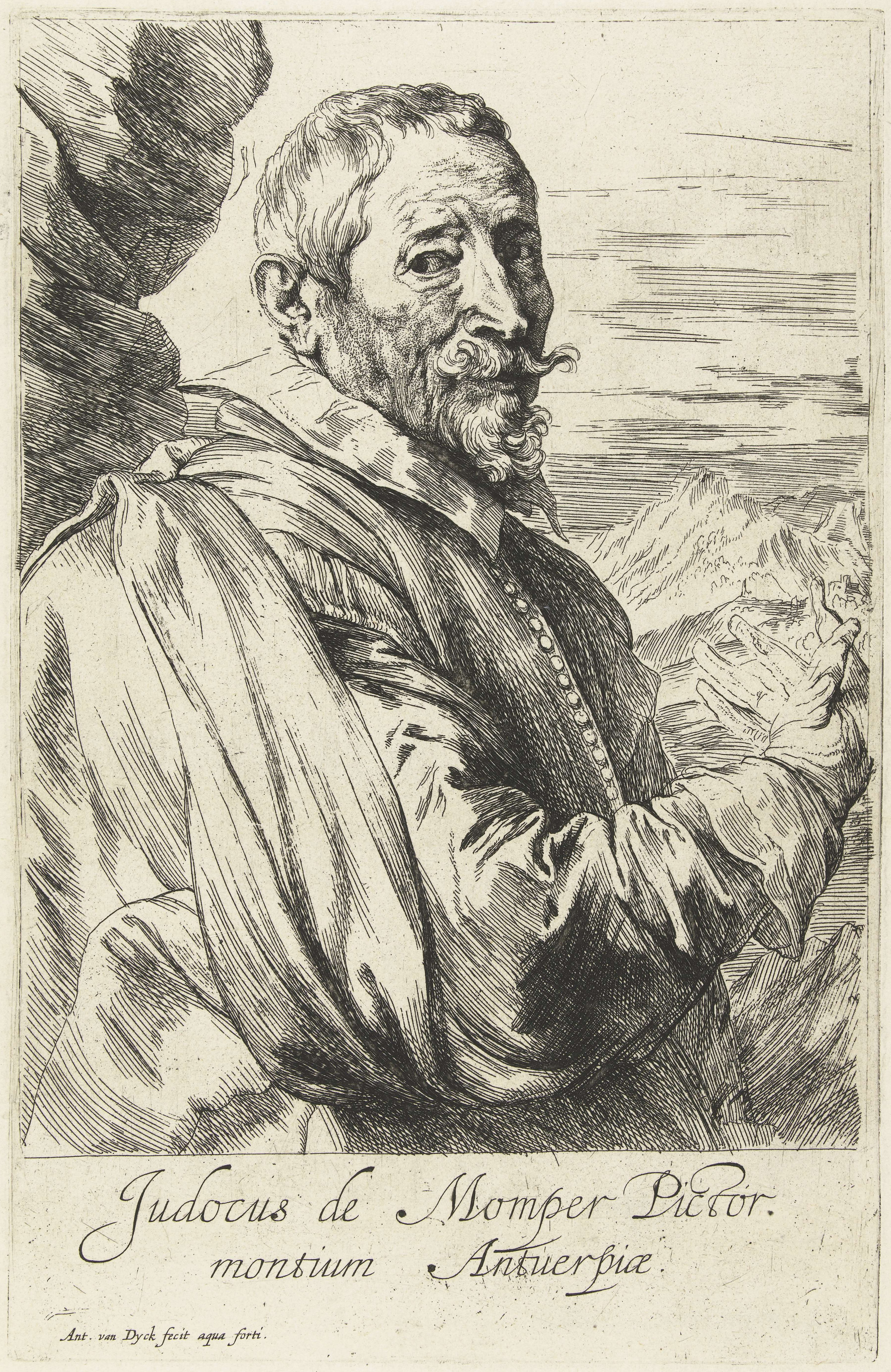
- Joos de Momper by Anthony van Dyck, 1632–1641
- Born: c. 1564; Antwerp, Habsburg Netherlands
- Died: 5 February 1635; Antwerp
- Known for: Painting
- Movement: Baroque

Joos de Momper the Younger or Joost de Momper the Younger (c. 1564 – 5 February 1635) was a Flemish landscape painter active in Antwerp between the late 16th century and the early 17th century. Brueghel's influence is clearly evident in many of de Momper's paintings. His work is situated at the transition from late 16th-century Mannerism to the greater realism in landscape painting that developed in the early 17th century. He achieved considerable success during his lifetime.

== Life ==
Joos de Momper was born in an artistic family of Antwerp and was named after his grandfather who was a landscape painter. His parents were Bartholomeus de Momper the Elder and Suzanna Halfroose. His grandfather was Joos de Momper de Elder, a painter and art dealer from Bruges. He learned to paint from his father who was a painter, art dealer, printer and publisher.

In 1581 he became a master in the Antwerp Guild of St. Luke at only 17 years old. It was assumed that in the 1580s, he travelled to Italy to study. Evidence for this trip was provided when landscape frescoes in the church of San Vitale in Rome, formerly attributed to Paul Bril, were given to Joos de Momper the Younger.

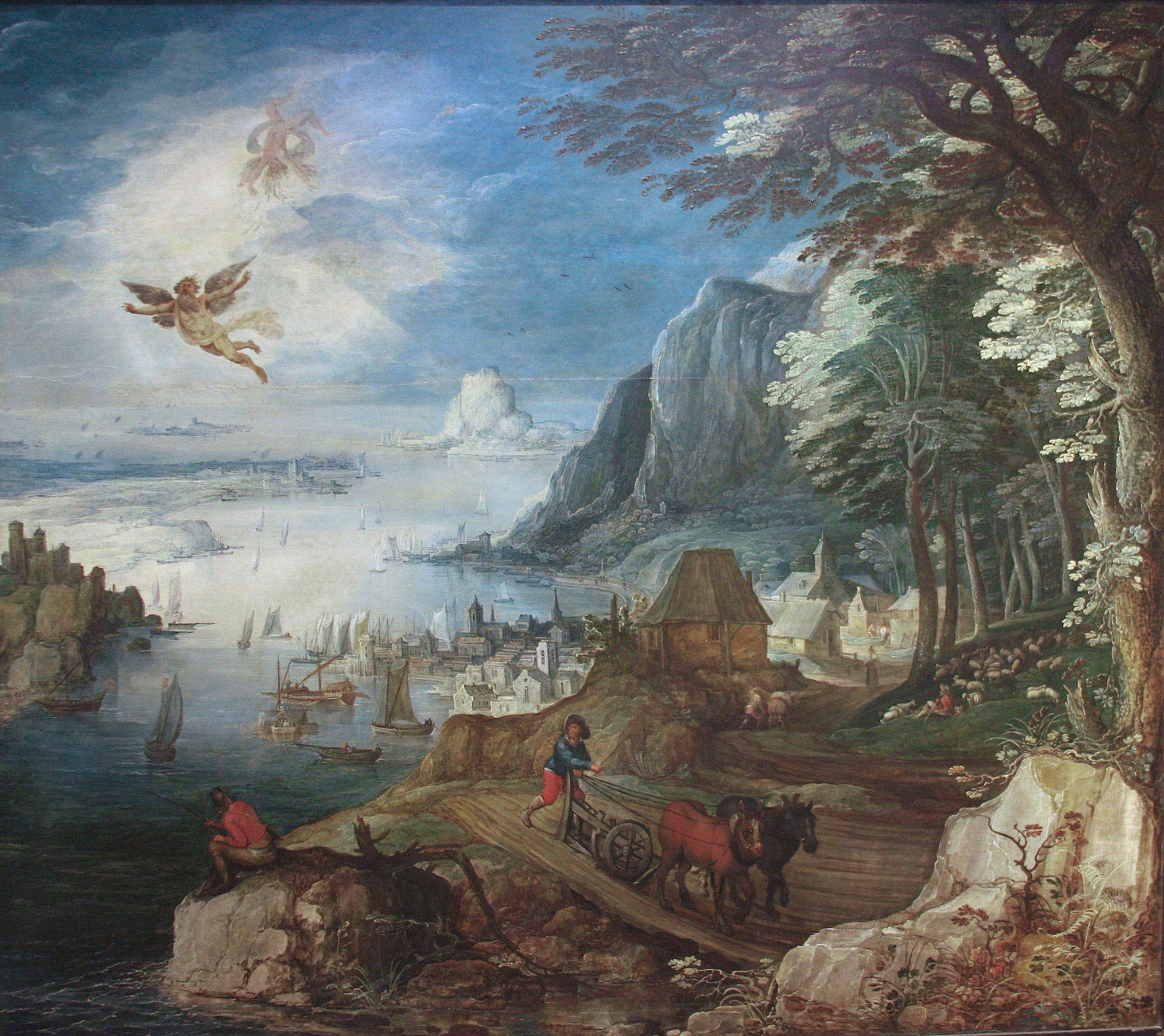
Landscape with the Fall of Icarus, 1579–1635, Nationalmuseum, Stockholm

On 4 September 1590 he married Elisabeth Gobijn. The couple had 10 children of whom Philippe de Momper became a painter. The painter Gaspard de Momper was either his son or a nephew. His pupils were Louis de Caullery and his son Philippe de Momper. His followers included his nephew Frans de Momper and Hercules Seghers.

De Momper enjoyed high-level patronage as is shown by the fact that Archduchess Isabella Clara Eugenia, the governess of the Southern Netherlands, sent in 1616 a letter to the Antwerp magistrate asking him to excuse de Momper from the payment of taxes and fees. The artist could use the tax exemption as in his later years he was not able to paint as diligently as before and he was spending too much money at the inn.

De Momper died in Antwerp on 5 February 1635. He left large debts, and his possessions were sold off by his creditors.

He was mentioned by Karel van Mander in his Schilder-boeck, and his likeness was engraved by Anthony van Dyck.

== Work ==
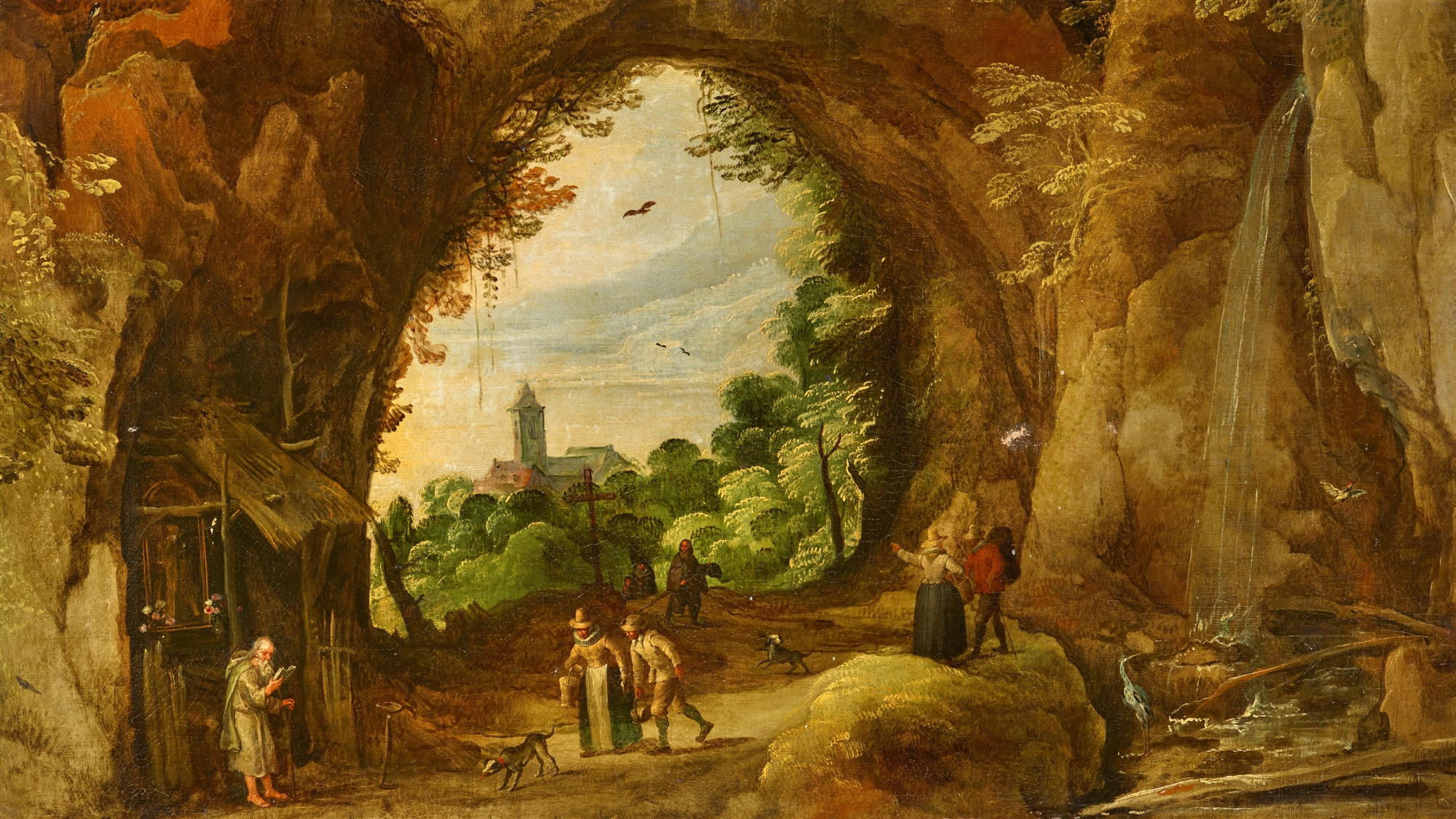
Grotto Landscape with a Hermitage, c. 1630, together with Jan Brueghel the Younger, private collection

De Momper primarily painted landscapes, the genre for which he was highly regarded during his lifetime. Only a small number of the 500 paintings attributed to de Momper are signed and just one is dated. The large output points to substantial workshop participation. About 10 percent of his works are winter landscapes. He often collaborated with figure painters such as Frans Francken II, Peter Snayers, Jan Brueghel the Elder and Jan Brueghel the Younger, usually on large, mountainous landscapes, whereby the other painters painted the staffage and de Momper the landscape. His works were often featured in the prestigious gallery paintings of collections (real and imagined) from the early seventeenth century.

He painted both fantasy landscapes, viewed from a high vantage point and employing a conventional Mannerist color transition of brown in the foreground to green and finally blue in the background, and more realistic landscapes with a lower viewpoint and more natural colors. His wide panoramas also feature groups of small figures.

De Momper's works are chiefly inspired by the steep craggy Alpine slopes and high rock masses depicted in Pieter Brueghel the Elder's work. His closeness to Jan Brueghel the Elder would have played a role in his exposure to the Bruegel idiom. This is also seen in some of the motifs of De Momper's work which go back to Pieter Bruegel's inventions, such as winter landscapes and grain harvests. One of his works representing a Storm at Sea was previously attributed to Pieter Brueghel but is now generally ascribed to de Momper.

Another influence on De Momper was the work of the Flemish landscape specialist Lodewijk Toeput, who went on to make a career in Italy. De Momper emphasized stylization over naturalistic effects and used depth and atmosphere to achieve his goal of spatial construction.

De Momper's work, like that of the contemporary landscape painter Abel Grimmer, has often been dismissed for its formulaic repetition of stock motifs and presentation while his large works have been interpreted as merely a "broad-brush" version of Joachim Patinir's world landscape a century after its first formulation. He is regarded as representing the end of a tradition rather than a revitalization or an innovation of landscape painting as was happening in the Dutch Republic in the 17th century. On the other hand, the large size of his works and his collaboration with other leading artists suggest costliness and esteem for pictorial refinement.

== Notable works ==
- Minerva's Visit to the Muses (with Hendrik van Balen for the figures and Jan Breughel the Elder for the flowers) – Royal Museum of Fine Arts, Antwerp
- Flemish Market and Washing Place – Museo del Prado, Madrid
- Mountain Landscape with the Temptation of Christ (Sebastiaen Vrancx painted the figures) National Gallery of Prague
- Large Mountain Landscape – Liechtenstein Museum, Vienna
- Dune Landscape with Travelers and Cattle – National Museum, Warsaw
- Mountain Landscape with Campers and a Broken Tree – National Museum, Warsaw

== Gallery ==
Selected paintings

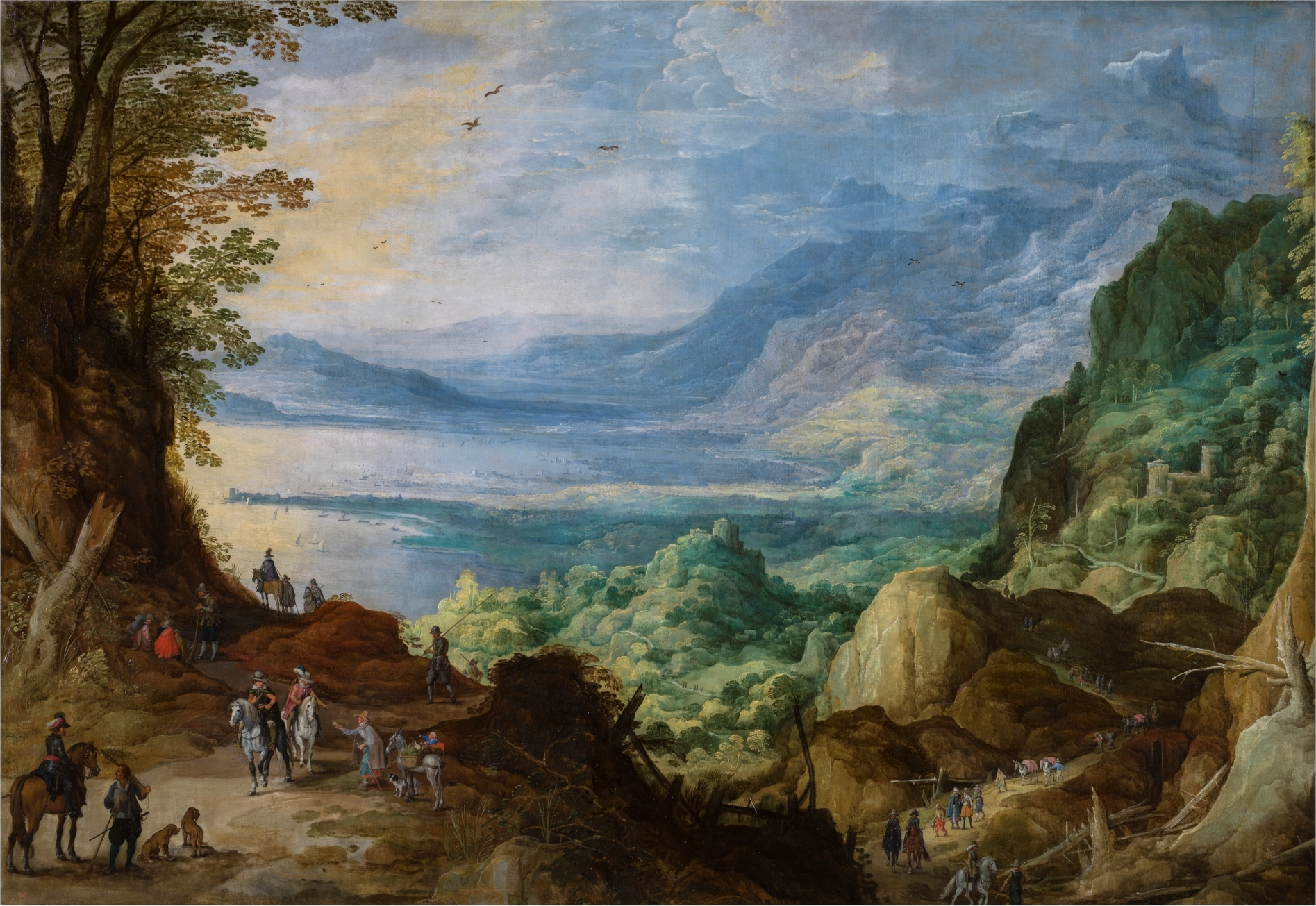
Landscape with Sea and Mountains, c. 1623, Museum of Prado, Madrid

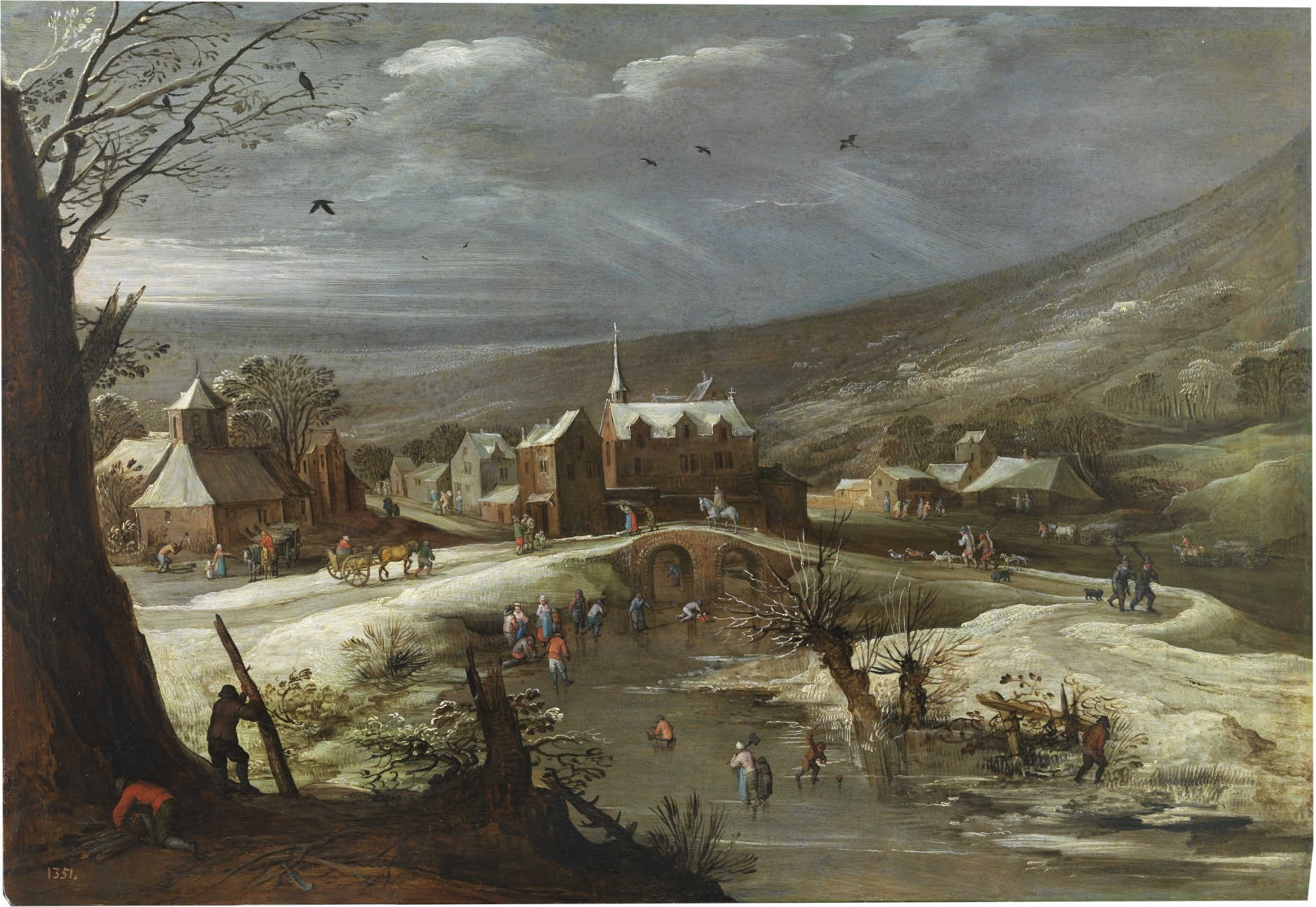
Winter landscape with skaters, c. 1620, Prado Museum, Madrid

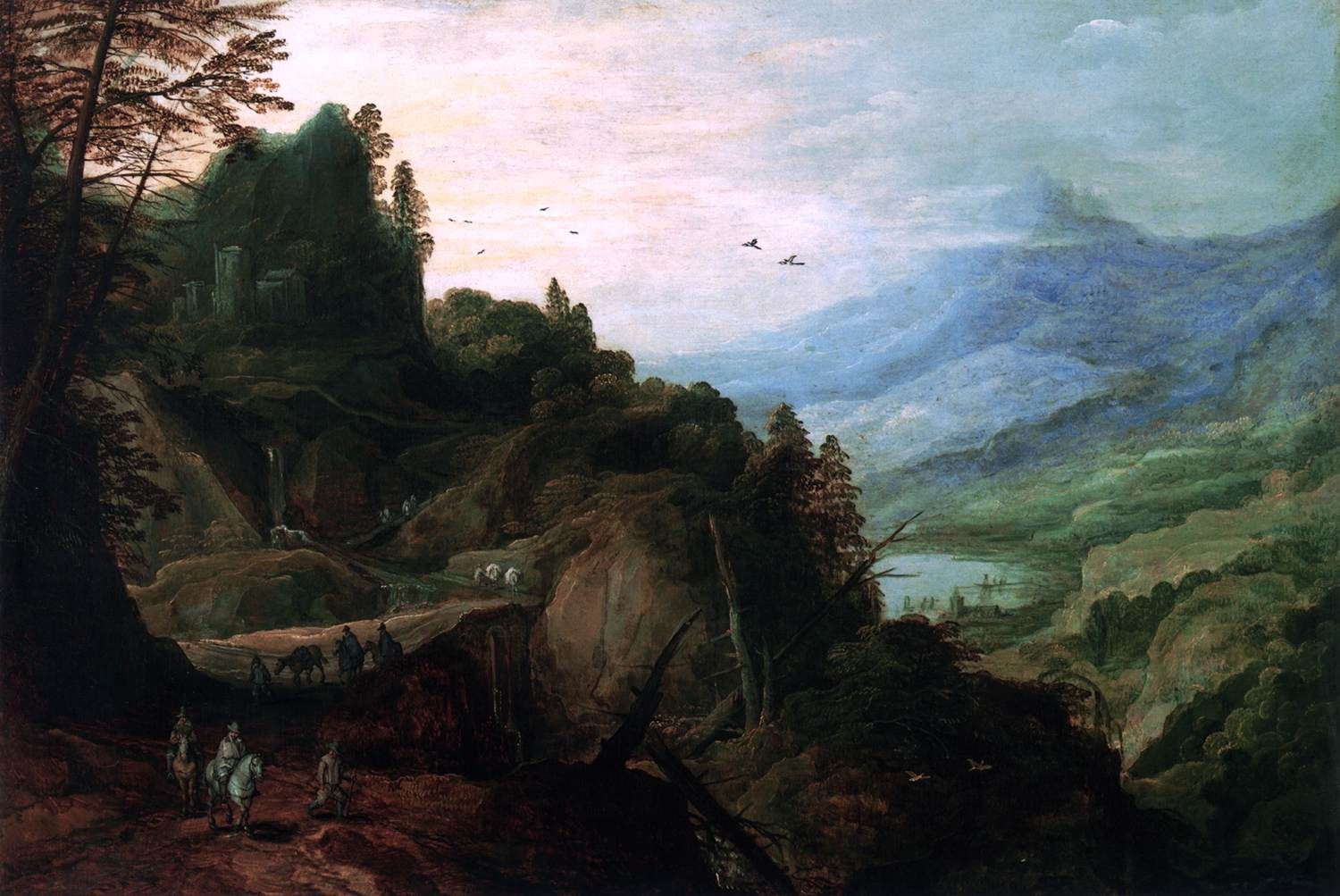
Landscape with a Mountain Pass, c. 1620, Liechtenstein Museum, Liechtenstein

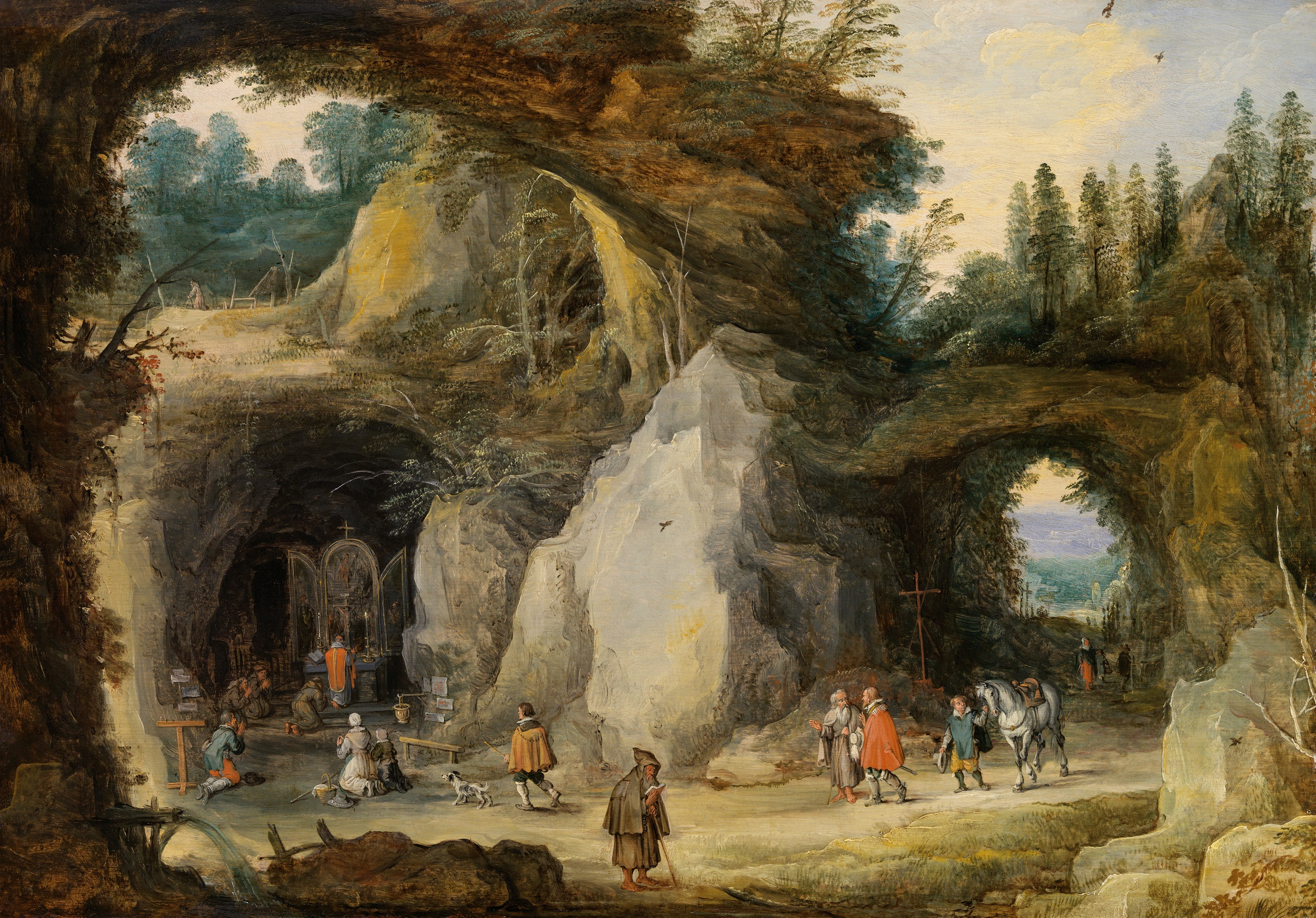
Mountain Landscape with Pilgrims in a Grotto Chapel, c. 1616, Liechtenstein Museum, Liechtenstein

Mountain Landscape, c. 1625, Kunsthistorisches Museum, Vienna

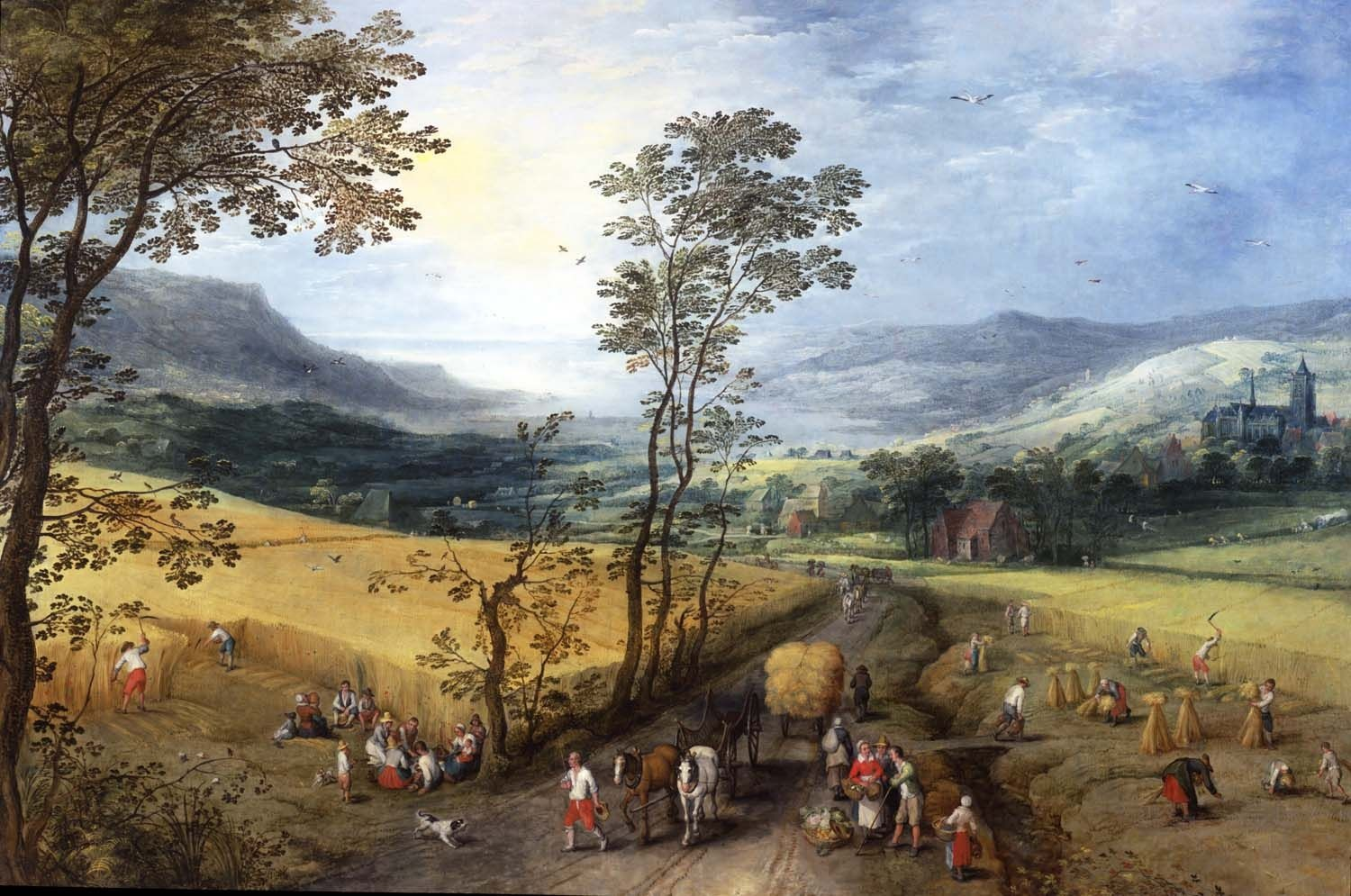
Summer landscape with harvesters, Museum of Art, Toledo, Ohio

== See also ==
- Flemish painting
