= List of painters in the collection of the Frans Hals Museum =

This is an incomplete list of painters in the collection of the Frans Hals Museum in Haarlem, Netherlands, with the number of artworks represented, and sorted by century of birth. For more information about the collection which comprises more than 760 works, see Frans Hals Museum. More than 100 works are by unknown or anonymous painters, and though over 200 individual artists are in the collection, many of these are represented by only one work, which is often a commemorative portrait of a Haarlem politician. The collection was founded by the Haarlem city council and the first gallery was in the city hall itself. The highlights of the collection are the oldest works such as former altarpieces from Haarlem churches, but also large works for other former Haarlem institutions by Frans Hals, Maarten van Heemskerck, and Jan de Bray. Most of the artists in the collection were born in the 16th and 17th centuries. Only four women are represented with works in the collection, namely Judith Leyster, Charley Toorop and the sisters Catharina Jacoba and Christina Gerardus Enschedé.

== Born in the 15th century ==
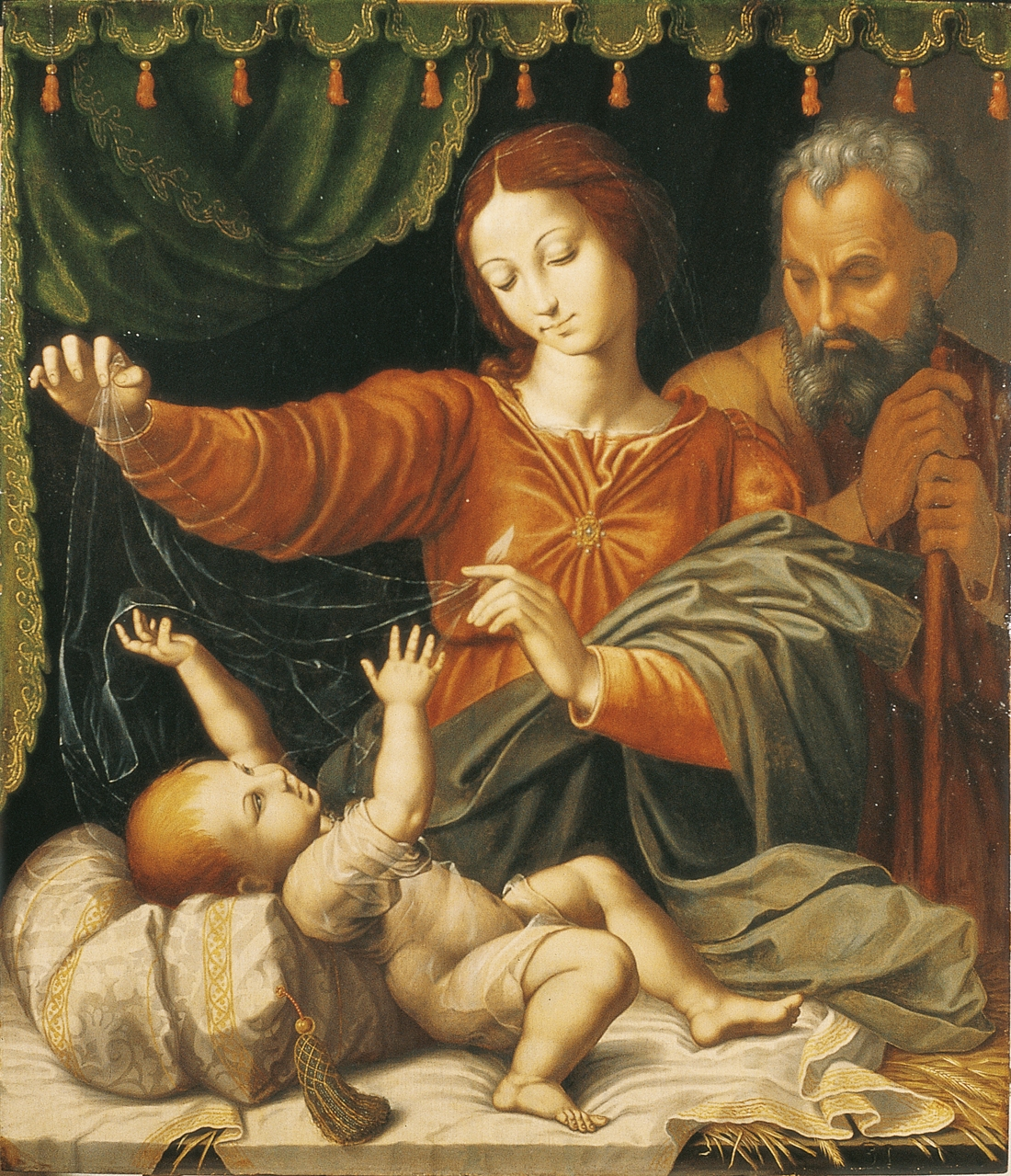
This work after Raphael is an example of an early religious work that entered the municipal collection in 1625. It is currently hanging where it came from in the Commanderij van Sint Jan

- David, Gerard (Oudewater, 1460 – Bruges, 1523), 1 work
- Heemskerck, Maarten van (Heemskerk, 1498 – Haarlem, 1574), 24 works
- Master of Alkmaar (Alkmaar, 1475 – Alkmaar, 1515), 3 works
- Memling, Hans (Seligenstadt, 1430 – Bruges, 1494), 1 work
- Mostaert, Jan (Haarlem, 1465 – Haarlem, 1553), 1 work
- Raphael (after) (Urbino, 1483 – Rome, 1520), 1 work
- Scorel, Jan van (Schoorl, 1495 – Utrecht, 1562), 4 works

== Born in the 16th century ==
- Anthonisz., Aert (Antwerp, 1579 – Amsterdam, 1620), 2 works
- Bloemaert, Abraham (Gorinchem, 1564 – Utrecht, 1651), 1 work
- Bollongier, Hans (Haarlem, 1600 – Haarlem, 1673), 2 works
- Bray, Salomon de (Amsterdam, 1597 – Haarlem, 1664), 1 work
- Bruegel, Pieter (Breda, 1526 – Brussels, 1569), 1 work
- Brueghel, Pieter (Brussels, 1564 – Antwerp, 1638), 1 work
- Claesz., Pieter (Berchem, 1597 – Haarlem, 1660), 1 work
- Codde, Pieter (Amsterdam, 1599 – Amsterdam, 1678), 4 works
- Cornelisz. van Haarlem, Cornelis (Haarlem, 1562 – Haarlem, 1637), 19 works
- Droochsloot, Joost Cornelisz. (Utrecht, 1630 – Utrecht, 1673), 1 work
- Duyster, Willem Cornelisz. (Amsterdam, 1599 – Amsterdam, 1635), 1 work
- Dyck, Floris van (Haarlem, 1575 – Haarlem, 1651), 1 work
- Engelsz., Cornelis (Gouda, 1574 – Haarlem, 1650), 2 works
- Geest, Wybrand de (Leeuwarden, 1592 – Leeuwarden, 1661), 4 works
- Goltzius, Hendrick (Venlo, 1558 – Haarlem, 1617), 5 works
- Goyen, Jan Josefsz. van (Leiden, 1596 – The Hague, 1656), 3 works
- Grebber, Frans Pietersz. de (Haarlem, 1573 – Haarlem, 1649), 9 works
- Hals, Dirck (Haarlem, 1591 – Haarlem, 1656), 4 works
- Hals, Frans (Antwerp, 1582 – Haarlem, 1666), 15 works
- Heda, Willem Claesz. (Haarlem, 1594 – Haarlem, 1680), 2 works
- Honthorst, Gerard van (Utrecht, 1592 – Utrecht, 1656), 2 works
- Kemp, Nicolaes de (Haarlem, 1574 – Haarlem, 1647), 1 work
- Keyser, Thomas de (Amsterdam, 1596 – Amsterdam, 1667), 1 work
- Laer, Pieter van (Haarlem, 1592 – Haarlem, 1642), 1 work
- Mander, Karel van (Meulebeke, 1548 – Amsterdam, 1606), 3 works
- Mandijn, Jan (Haarlem, 1500 – Antwerp, 1560), 1 work
- Matham, Jacob (Haarlem, 1571 – Haarlem, 1631), 1 work
- Mierevelt, Michiel Jansz. van (Delft, 1567 – Delft, 1641), 13 works
- Molijn, Pieter de (London, 1595 – Haarlem, 1661), 1 work
- Molijn, Pieter de (London, 1595 – Haarlem, 1661), 2 works
- Nieulandt, Adriaen van (Antwerp, 1587 – Amsterdam, 1658), 1 work
- Pietersz., Pieter (Antwerp, 1540 – Amsterdam, 1603), 3 works
- Pot, Hendrik Cornelisz (Amsterdam, 1585 – Amsterdam, 1657), 8 works
- Pynas, Jacob Symonsz. (Haarlem, 1592 – Delft, 1650), 1 work
- Ravesteyn, Jan Antonisz. van (The Hague, 1572 – The Hague, 1657), 5 works
- Rijck, Pieter Cornelisz. van (Delft, 1567 – Italy, 1637), 1 work
- Rubens, Peter Paul (Antwerp, 1577 – Antwerp, 1640), 1 work
- Saenredam, Pieter Jansz. (Assendelft, 1597 – Haarlem, 1665), 3 works
- Savery, Hans (Kortrijk, 1564 – Haarlem, 1623), 1 work
- Savery, Roelant (Kortrijk, 1576 – Utrecht, 1639), 1 work
- Schooten, Floris van (Haarlem, 1588 – Haarlem, 1656), 2 works
- Seghers, Hercules (Haarlem, 1589 – The Hague, 1638), 1 work
- Soutman, Pieter Claesz. (Haarlem, 1580 – Haarlem, 1657), 5 works
- Sweelink, Gerrit Pietersz. (Amsterdam, 1566 – Amsterdam, 1612), 1 work
- Velde, Esaias van de (Amsterdam, 1587 – The Hague, 1630), 3 works
- Venne, Adriaen Pietersz. van de (Delft, 1589 – The Hague, 1662), 1 work
- Verbeeck, Cornelis (Haarlem, 1590 – Haarlem, 1647), 1 work
- Vermeyen, Jan Cornelisz. (Beverwijk, 1500 – Brussels, 1559), 2 works
- Verspronck, Johannes Cornelisz. (Haarlem, 1600 – Haarlem, 1662), 13 works
- Vries, Abraham de (Rotterdam, 1590 – The Hague, 1655), 1 work
- Vroom, Hendrik Cornelisz. (Haarlem, 1563 – Haarlem, 1640), 3 works
- Wieringen, Cornelis Claesz. van (Haarlem, 1580 – Haarlem, 1633), 2 works
- Willaerts, Adam (London, 1577 – Utrecht, 1664), 1 work
- Witte, Peter de (Bruges, 1548 – Munich, 1628), 1 work

== Born in the 17th century ==
- Anraedt, Pieter van (Utrecht, 1635 – Deventer, 1678), 1 work
- Backer, Adriaen (Amsterdam, 1609 – Amsterdam, 1685), 1 work
- Baen, Jan de (Haarlem, 1633 – The Hague, 1702), 1 work
- Beelt, Cornelis (Rotterdam, 1607 – Haarlem or Rotterdam, 1664), 3 works
- Beerstraaten, Jan Abrahamsz. (Amsterdam, 1622 – Amsterdam, 1666), 2 works
- Bega, Cornelis Pietersz. (Haarlem, 1620 – Haarlem, 1664), 1 work
- Berchem, Nicolaes Pietersz. (Haarlem, 1620 – Amsterdam, 1683), 2 works
- Berckheyde, Gerrit Adriaensz. (Haarlem, 1638 – Haarlem, 1698), 5 works
- Berckheyde, Job Adriaensz. (Haarlem, 1630 – Haarlem, 1692), 3 works
- Bleeck, Richard van (The Hague, 1670 – London, 1733), 4 works
- Bleker, Gerrit Claesz. (Haarlem, 1592 – Haarlem, 1656), 1 work
- Bodecker, George (1658–1727), 2 works
- Boonen, Arnold (Dordrecht, 1669 – Amsterdam, 1729), 7 works
- Borch, Gerard ter (Zwolle, 1617 – Deventer, 1681), 2 works
- Brakenburgh, Richard (Haarlem, 1650 – Haarlem, 1702), 1 work
- Brandon, Jan Hendrik (1660–1714), 2 works
- Bray, Jan de (Haarlem, 1627 – Haarlem, 1697), 13 works
- Brekelenkam, Quiringh Gerritsz. van (Zwammerdam, 1622 – Leiden, 1670), 2 works
- Brouwer, Adriaen (Oudenaarde, 1605 – Antwerp, 1638), 1 work
- Cooghen, Leendert van der (Haarlem, 1632 – Haarlem, 1681), 1 work
- Court, Johannes Franciscus de la (Brussels, 1684 – Leiden, 1753), 4 works
- Court, Martinus de la (Leiden, 1640 – Brussels, 1710), 5 works
- Craesbeeck, Joos van (Linter, 1605 – Brussels, 1659), 1 work
- Croos, Anthonie Jansz. van der (Alkmaar, 1606 – The Hague, 1662), 1 work
- Cuyp, Aelbert (Dordrecht, 1620 – Dordrecht, 1691), 1 work
- Decker, Frans (1684–1751), 8 works
- Dusart, Cornelis (Haarlem, 1660 – Haarlem, 1704), 2 works
- Ehinger, Emanuel (active 1687–1699), 2 works
- Everdingen, Allaert van (Alkmaar, 1621 – Amsterdam, 1675), 1 work
- Everdingen, Cesar Boetius van (Alkmaar, 1617 – Alkmaar, 1678), 2 works
- Grebber, Pieter Fransz. de (Haarlem, 1600 – Haarlem, 1653), 5 works
- Haensbergen, Jan van (Gorinchem, 1642 – The Hague, 1705), 1 work
- Hals, Frans (Haarlem, 1618 – Haarlem, 1669), 1 work
- Hals, Harmen (Haarlem, 1611 – Haarlem, 1669), 2 works
- Hals, Reynier (Haarlem, 1627 – Haarlem, 1671), 3 works
- Haringh, Daniël (The Hague, 1636 – The Hague, 1713), 14 works
- Haye, Reinier de la (The Hague, 1640 – The Hague, 1700), 1 work
- Heemskerck, Egbert (Haarlem, 1634 – London, 1704), 2 works
- Heeremans, Thomas (Haarlem, 1641 – Haarlem, 1694), 1 work
- Heerschop, Hendrick (Haarlem, 1626 – Haarlem, 1690), 1 work
- Hees, Gerrit van (1629–1702), 1 work
- Helst, Bartholomeus van der (Haarlem, 1613 – Amsterdam, 1670), 1 work
- Holsteyn, Cornelis (Haarlem, 1618 – Amsterdam, 1658), 2 works
- Hulsman, Johann (Cologne, 1580–1643), 1 work
- Hulst, Frans de (Haarlem, 1606 – Haarlem, 1661), 1 work
- Jongh, Ludolf de (Overschie, 1616 – Rotterdam, 1679), 1 work
- Knijff, Willem (Haarlem, 1646 – Haarlem, 1670), 2 works
- Knüpfer, Nicolaes (Leipzig, 1609 – Utrecht, 1655), 1 work
- Lagoor, Johan de (Haarlem, 1620 – Haarlem, 1660), 1 work
- Leyster, Judith (Haarlem, 1609 – Heemstede, 1660), 2 works
- Lingelbach, Johannes (Frankfurt am Main, 1622 – Amsterdam, 1674), 1 work
- Loo, Jacob van (Sluis, 1614 – Paris, 1670), 5 works
- Looten, Jan (Amsterdam, 1618 – England, 1683), 1 work
- Maas, Dirk (Haarlem, 1659 – Haarlem, 1717), 1 work
- Maes, Nicolaes (Dordrecht, 1634 – Amsterdam, 1693), 6 works
- Marrel, Jacob (Frankenthal, 1613 – Frankfurt-am-Main, 1681), 1 work
- Mieris, Frans van (Leiden, 1689 – Leiden, 1763), 1 work
- Mijtens, Johannes (The Hague, 1614 – The Hague, 1670), 2 works
- Molenaer, Jan Miense (Haarlem, 1610 – Haarlem, 1688), 3 works
- Momper, Frans de (Antwerp, 1603 – Antwerp, 1660), 1 work
- Naiveu, Matthijs (Leiden, 1647 – Amsterdam, 1721), 1 work
- Nason, Pieter (1612–1690), 2 works
- Netscher, Caspar (Heidelberg, 1639 – The Hague, 1684), 1 work
- Netscher, Constantijn (The Hague, 1668 – The Hague, 1723), 1 work
- Netscher, Theodorus (Bordeaux, 1661 – The Hague, 1728), 2 works
- Ostade, Adriaen van (Haarlem, 1610 – Haarlem, 1685), 2 works
- Ostade, Isaac van (Haarlem, 1621 – Haarlem, 1649), 5 works
- Oudendijck, Adriaen (Haarlem, 1677 – Haarlem, 1704), 1 work
- Ovens, Jürgen (Tonning, 1623 – Friedrichstadt, 1678), 1 work
- Post, Frans Jansz. (Leiden, 1612 – Haarlem, 1680), 1 work
- Post, Pieter Jansz. (Haarlem, 1608 – The Hague, 1669), 1 work
- Pronck, Hendrick (died in Amsterdam, 1693), 1 work
- Querfurt, Tobias (1660 – Wolfenbüttel, 1734), 1 work
- Quinkhard, Jan Maurits (Rees, 1688 – Amsterdam, 1772), 3 works
- Ragueneau, Abraham (London, 1623 – London, 1690), 3 works
- Roestraeten, Pieter Gerritsz. van (Haarlem, 1630 – London, 1700), 1 work
- Rombouts, Gillis (Haarlem, 1630 – Haarlem, 1672), 1 work
- Rombouts, Salomon (Haarlem, 1655 – Italy, 1695), 1 work
- Roosendael, Nicolaas (Hoorn, 1634 – Amsterdam, 1686), 1 work
- Ruisdael, Jacob Isaacksz. van (Haarlem, 1628 – Haarlem, 1682), 4 works
- Ruysdael, Salomon van (Naarden, 1602 – Haarlem, 1670), 3 works
- Rijckhals, Frans (Middelburg, 1600 – Middelburg, 1647), 1 work
- Santvoort, Dirck Dircksz. van (Amsterdam, 1610 – Amsterdam, 1680), 2 works
- Santvoort, Pieter Dircksz. van (Amsterdam, 1604 – Amsterdam, 1635), 1 work
- Steen, Jan Havicksz. (Leiden, 1626 – Leiden, 1679), 1 work
- Storck, Abraham (Amsterdam, 1644 – Amsterdam, 1708), 2 works
- Sweerts, Michael (Brussels, 1618 – Goa, 1664), 1 work
- Toorenvliet, Jacob (Leiden, 1640 – Leiden, 1719), 1 work
- Troost, Cornelis (Amsterdam, 1697 – Amsterdam, 1750), 1 work
- Troyen, Rombout van (Amsterdam, 1605 – Amsterdam, 1655), 1 work
- Ulft, Jacob van der (Gorinchem, 1627 – Noordwijk, 1690), 1 work
- Velde, Jan van de (Haarlem, 1620 – Enkhuizen, 1662), 1 work
- Verkolje, Jan (Amsterdam, 1650 – Delft, 1693), 5 works
- Verkolje, Nicolaas (Delft, 1673 – Amsterdam, 1746), 3 works
- Vermeer van Haarlem, Jan (Haarlem, 1628 – Haarlem, 1691), 3 works
- Verwilt, François (Rotterdam, 1623 – Rotterdam, 1691), 1 work
- Victors, Jan (Amsterdam, 1619 – Indonesia, 1676), 1 work
- Vinne, Jan Vincentsz. van der (Haarlem, 1663 – Haarlem, 1721), 1 work
- Vinne, Vincent Laurensz. van der (Haarlem, 1628 – Haarlem, 1702), 5 works
- Vinne, Laurens Vincentsz. van der (Haarlem, 1658 – Haarlem, 1729), 2 works
- Weenix, Jan Baptist (Amsterdam, 1621 – Utrecht, 1661), 4 works
- Wet, Jacob de (Haarlem, 1610 – Haarlem, 1675), 3 works
- Wet (II), Jacob de (Haarlem, 1641 – Haarlem, 1697), 1 work
- Wijck, Thomas (Beverwijk, 1616 – Haarlem, 1677), 2 works
- Wijnants, Jan (Haarlem, 1632 – Amsterdam, 1684), 1 work
- Willaerts, Abraham (Utrecht, 1603 – Utrecht, 1669), 1 work
- Wils, Jan (Amsterdam, 1603 – Haarlem, 1666), 1 work
- Wilt, Thomas van der (Korendijk, 1659 – Delft, 1733), 2 works
- Wolfaerts, Jan Baptist (Antwerp, 1625 – Antwerp, 1687), 1 work
- Wouwerman, Jan (Haarlem, 1629 – Haarlem, 1666), 1 work
- Wouwerman, Philips (Haarlem, 1619 – Haarlem, 1668), 5 works
- Zijl, Roeloff (c1600 – Utrecht, 1630), 1 work

== Born in the 18th century ==
- Augustini, Jacobus Luberti (Haarlem, 1748 – Haarlem, 1822), 2 works
- Barbiers (III), Pieter (1772–1837), 5 works
- Bolomey, Benjamin Samuel (1739–1819), 3 works
- Buttner, Jurriaan (died in Amsterdam, 1767), 2 works
- Cels, Cornelis (Lier, Belgium, 1778 – Brussels, 1859), 3 works
- Claterbos, Augustijn (1750–1828), 1 work
- Croix, Pierre Frédéric de la (1709–1782), 3 works
- Dubois-Drahonet, Alexandre Jean (Paris, 1791 – Paris, 1834), 2 works
- Enschedé, Christina Gerardus (Haarlem, 1791 – Haarlem, 1873), 1 work
- Farret, Coenraad (1710–1730), 1 work
- Fournier, Jean (1703–1754), 4 works
- Garnier, Narcisse (Paris, 1770 – Paris, 1833), 2 works
- Hendriks, Wybrand (Amsterdam, 1744 – Haarlem, 1831), 17 works
- Hodges, Charles Howard (1764–1837), 6 works
- Hoorn, Jordanus (1753–1833), 1 work
- Horstink, Warnaar (Haarlem, 1756 – Haarlem, 1815), 3 works
- Horstok, Johannes Petrus van (Haarlem, 1745 – Haarlem, 1825), 4 works
- Jelgersma, Tako Hajo (Harlingen, 1702 – Haarlem, 1795), 3 works
- Kaldenbach, Arnold (died in Zutphen, 1799), 1 work
- Lelie, Adriaan de (Tilburg, 1755 – Amsterdam, 1820), 1 work
- Mol, Woutherus (1785–1857), 2 works
- Oorloft, Joseph Philippe (Brussels, 1792 – Brussels, 1861), 1 work
- Ouwater, Isaac (Amsterdam, 1748 – Amsterdam, 1793), 4 works
- Palthe, Jan (Deventer, 1717 – Leiden, 1769), 1 work
- Poort, Aldert Jacob van der (Dokkum, 1771 – Leeuwarden, 1807), 2 works
- Prins, Johannes Huibert (The Hague, 1757 – Utrecht, 1806), 1 work
- Puyl, Louis François Gerard van der (1750–1824), 1 work
- Reekers, Johannes (1790–1858), 1 work
- Reysen, Josef van (1768–1829), 1 work
- Schmidt, Izaäk (Amsterdam, 1740–1818), 2 works
- Temminck, Leonard (1753–1813), 2 works
- Hulst, Jan Baptist van der (Leuven, 1790 – Brussels, 1862), 2 works
- Vinne, Vincent Jansz. van der (Haarlem, 1736 – Haarlem, 1811), 4 works
- Zijderveld, Willem (Amsterdam, 1793 – Amsterdam, 1846), 1 work

== Born in the 19th century ==
- Beijer, Jan Lodewijk (Amsterdam, 1818 – Amsterdam, 1858), 1 work
- Bosboom, Johannes (The Hague, 1817 – The Hague, 1891), 1 work
- Cate, Hendrik Jan ten (Amsterdam, 1867 – Amsterdam, 1955), 1 work
- Craeyvanger, Reinier (Utrecht, 1812–1880), 2 works
- Dijsselhof, Gerrit Willem (1866 – Overveen, 1924), 1 work
- Egenberger, Johannes Hinderikus (Arnhem, 1822 – Utrecht, 1897), 1 work
- Ehnle, Adrianus Johannes (1819–1863), 1 work
- Enschedé, Catharina Jacoba (Haarlem, 1828 – Bloemendaal, 1883), 1 work
- Eymer, Arnoldus Johannes (1803–1863), 1 work
- Gestel, Leo (Woerden, 1881 – Hilversum, 1941), 5 works
- Gratama, Gerrit David (Groningen, 1874 – Haarlem, 1965), 2 works
- Israëls, Isaac (Amsterdam, 1865 – The Hague, 1934), 4 works
- Klinkenberg, Johannes Christiaan Karel (The Hague, 1852 – The Hague, 1924), 1 work
- Kruseman, Jan Adam (Haarlem, 1804 – Haarlem, 1862), 17 works
- Kruyder, Herman (Baarn, 1881 – Amsterdam, 1935), 12 works
- Looy, Jac. van (Haarlem, 1855 – Haarlem, 1930), 12 works
- Poorter, Bastiaan de (Haarlem, 1813–1880), 1 work
- Slager, Piet (Amsterdam, 1841–1912), 1 work
- Sluijters, Jan (Amsterdam, 1881–1957), 8 works
- Spoor, Cornelis (1867–1928), 1 work
- Springer, Cornelis (Amsterdam, 1817 – Hilversum, 1891), 2 works
- Stadt, C. van der (1860 – Haarlem, 1883), 1 work
- Thorn Prikker, Johan (The Hague, 1868 – Cologne, 1932), 1 work
- Toorop, Charley (Katwijk, 1891 – Bergen, 1955), 1 work
- Toorop, Jan (Katwijk, 1858 – Bergen, 1928), 2 works
- Verschuur, Wouter (Amsterdam, 1812 – Vorden, 1874), 2 works
- Weyand, Jacob Gerrit (Amsterdam, 1886 – Bakkum, 1960), 1 work
- Wijnveld, Barend (1820–1902), 1 work

== Born in the 20th century ==
- Kat, Otto B. De (Dordrecht, 1907 – Laren, 1995), 45 works
- Postma, Hannes (Haarlem, 1933 – 0), 1 work
- Verwey, Kees (Amsterdam, 1900 – Haarlem, 1995), 1 work
- Wezelaar, Han (Haarlem, 1901 – Amsterdam, 1984), 1 work
