= Philips de Momper the Elder =

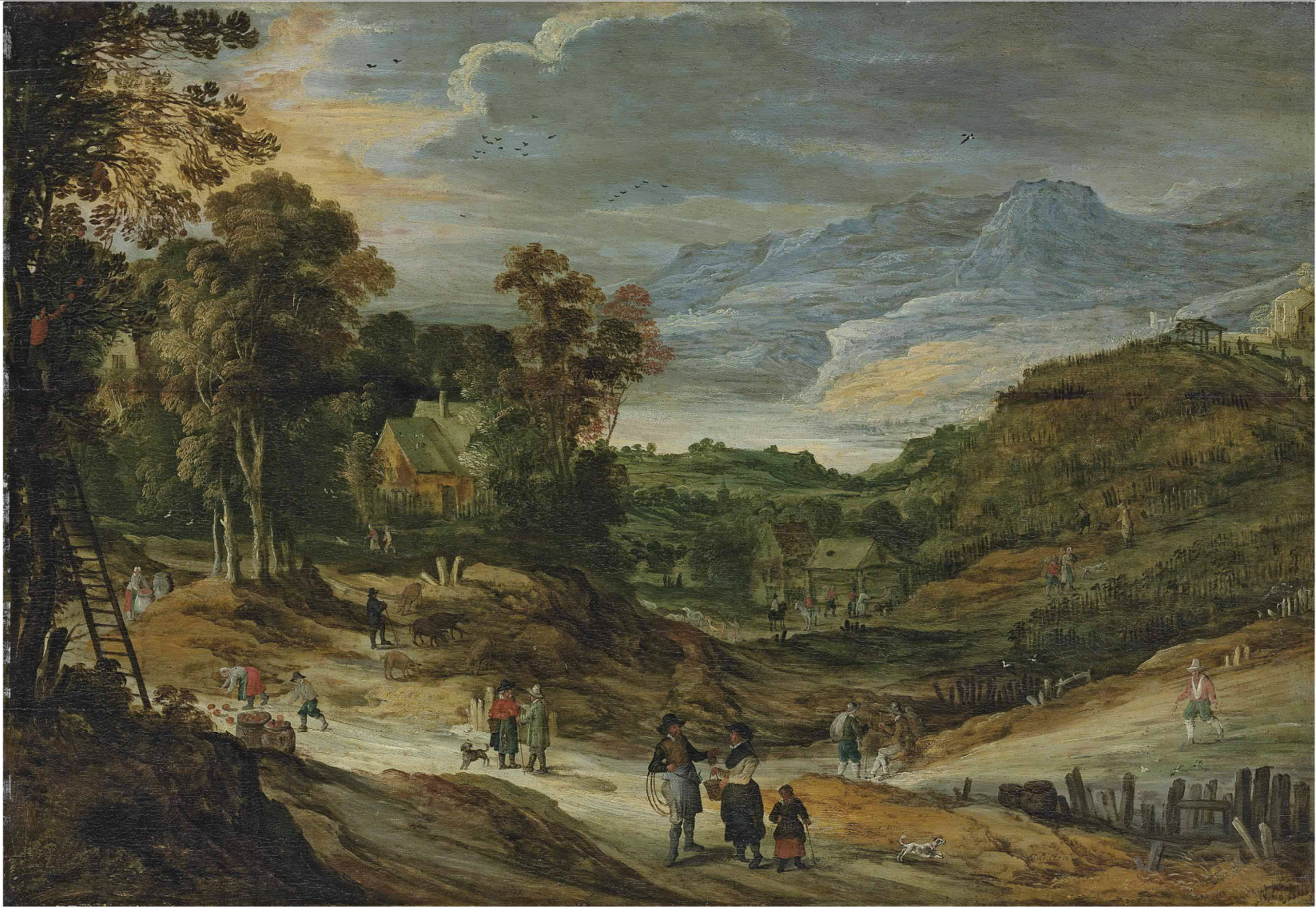
Wooded landscape with cottages, figures picking apples, mountains beyond

Philips de Momper the Elder, Philips de Momper (I) or Philippe de Momper (I) (1598–1634) was a Flemish landscape painter and son of the prominent landscape painter Joos de Momper. His work was virtually unknown until a group of paintings, mainly depicting Treviso and Rome, which had formerly been attributed to his father were reassigned to him. The artist is often confused with his cousin Philips de Momper the Younger (or Philips de Momper (II)) (c. 1610–1675).

== Life ==
Philips de Momper the Elder was born in Antwerp as the son of the eminent landscape painter Joos de Momper. The de Momper family was a prominent family of landscape painters and printmakers, originally from Bruges, which had settled in Antwerp in the 16th century. Philips de Momper was one of ten children. His brother Gaspard may also have worked as an artist, but little is known about his life.

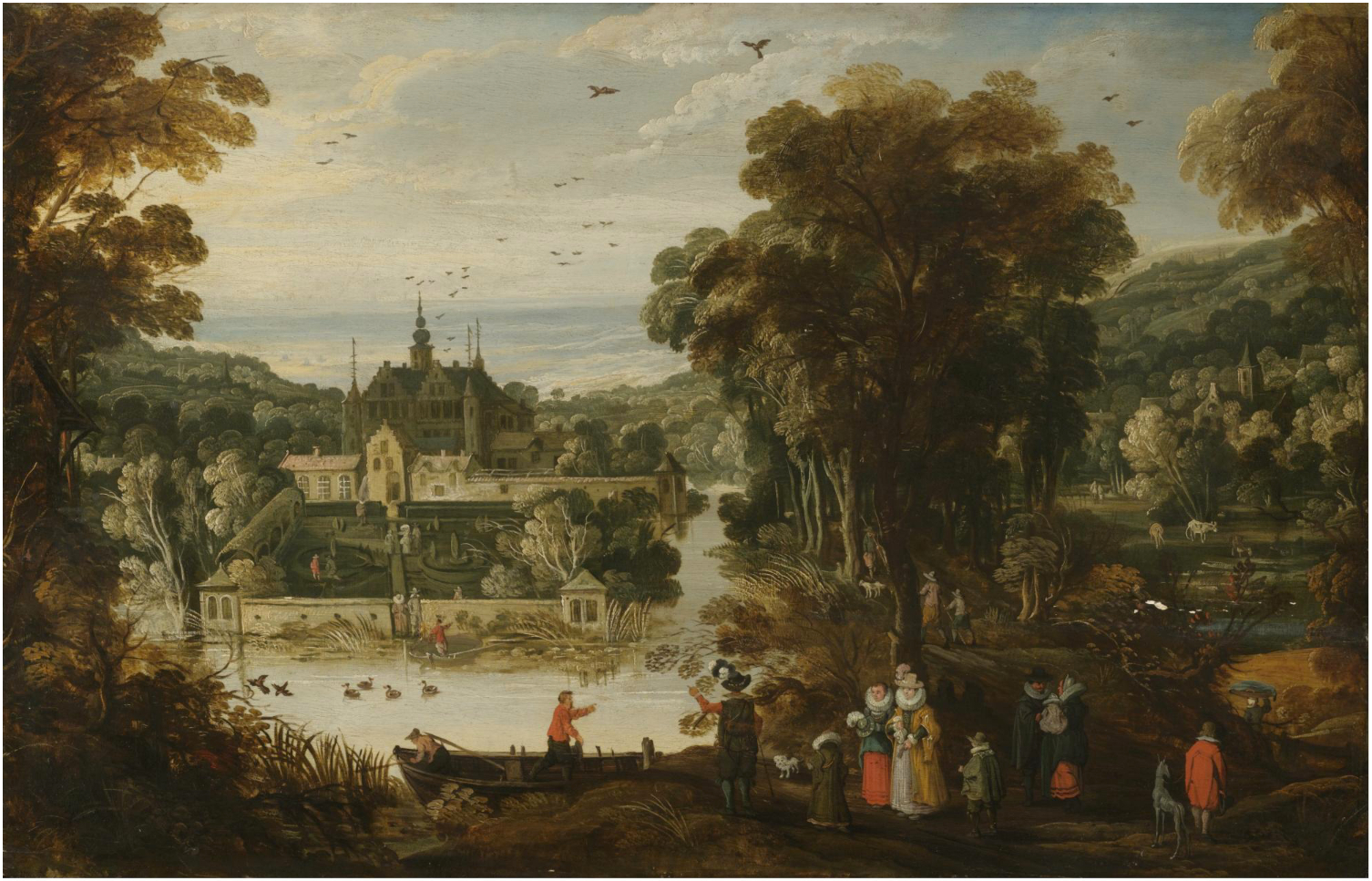
Landscape with a moated palace, and figures awaiting the ferry on the near side

Philips de Momper the Elder trained with his father Joos. Before joining the Antwerp Guild of Saint Luke he travelled to Italy in the company of his good friend Jan Brueghel the Younger, a scion of the famous Brueghel family and the son of Jan Brueghel the Elder. Philips created in Rome a number of paintings depicting scenes of Rome and its surroundings. Jan de Momper is believed to have joined the Bentvueghels, an organization of mainly Flemish and Dutch painters active in Rome. He was in Rome in the period 1622–1624.

Philips de Momper was recorded back in Antwerp when he joined the local Guild of Saint Luke as a 'wijnmeester', i.e. the son of a member, in November 1624.

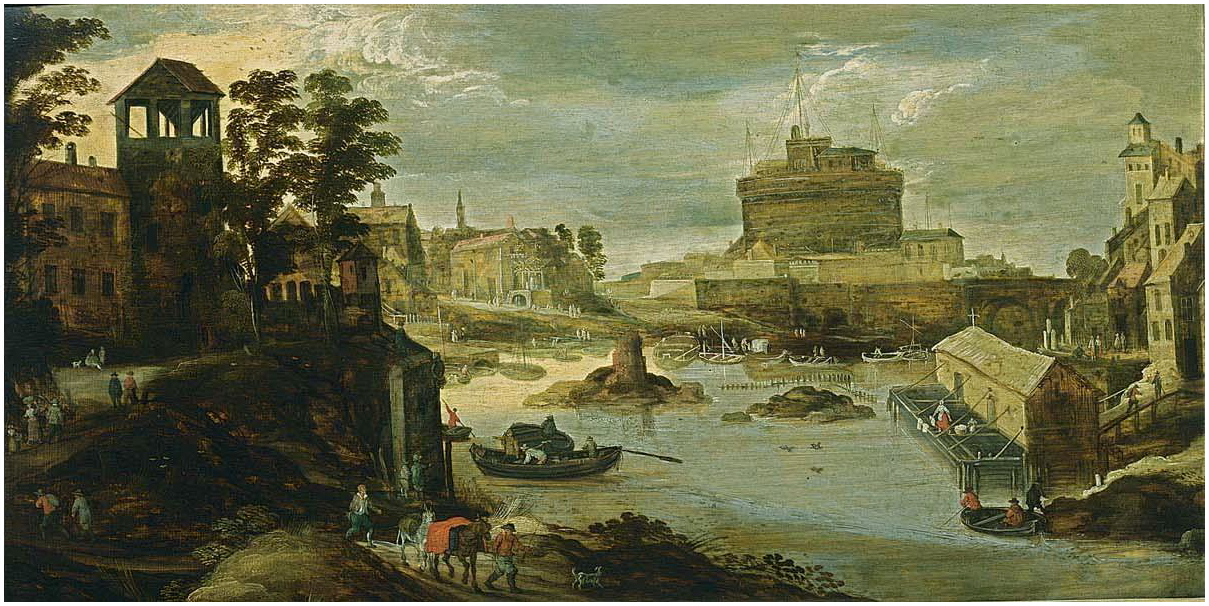
View of the Castel Sant'Angelo, the Ponte d'Angelo and the Tiber in the foreground

Philips de Momper died in Antwerp in 1634.

== Work ==
Philips de Momper was a painter and draughtsman of landscapes. He also contributed the staffage in compositions of fellow painters.

As Philips de Momper had worked in his father's studio he was thoroughly familiar with his father's style. A number of his pictures have therefore been attributed to his father. However, he was still able to develop an independent style, incorporating his own ideas and contemporary fashions. Philips also showed a preference for certain motifs which show his personal signature.

As there are no signed works by the artist it has been difficult to define his oeuvre. Certain works that were originally attributed to his father Joos have tentatively since been ascribed to Philips.

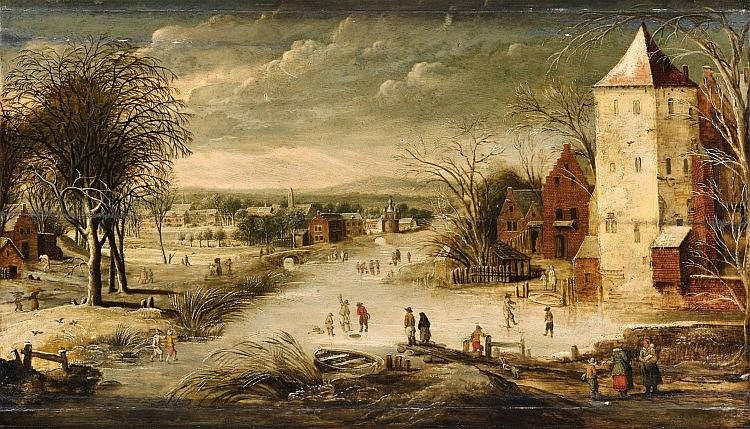
Village scene in winter with skaters

A first group of works were identified by Dr Klaus Ertz in a 1986 monograph on Philips' father Joos de Momper. Dr Ertz ascribed to Philips a group of paintings, mainly depicting Treviso and Rome, which he called the 'Treviso group'. These works, which had traditionally been attributed to his father Joos, show a consistency in terms of content and style. Stylistically, in particular their composition and colour scheme indicate that these paintings were likely created in the 1620s at the earliest. The paintings reveal a significant Italian influence, likely attributable to his trip to Italy in the early 1620s. An example is Village scene by a river, said to be a view of Treviso (At Sotheby's on 26 April 2007 in London, lot 8). In this composition, Phillippe de Momper captured the daily life of a riverside town, believed to be Treviso.

Another group of paintings tentatively attributed to Philips are views in narrow river valleys often incorporating deer. The group distinguishes itself from Joos' work by the lusher vegetation and the less strident palette and touch are less strident. The inclusion in the pictures of peacefully grazing deer is also typical for the group. An example of this group is the Valley in a mountainous landscape (Fondation Custodia).
