= Zijderveld (surname) =

Zijderveld is a surname. Notable people with the surname include:

- Chantalle Zijderveld (born 2000), Dutch swimmer
- Willem Zijderveld (1796–1840), Dutch painter
