= The Little Bridge =

Painting by Gillis Rombouts

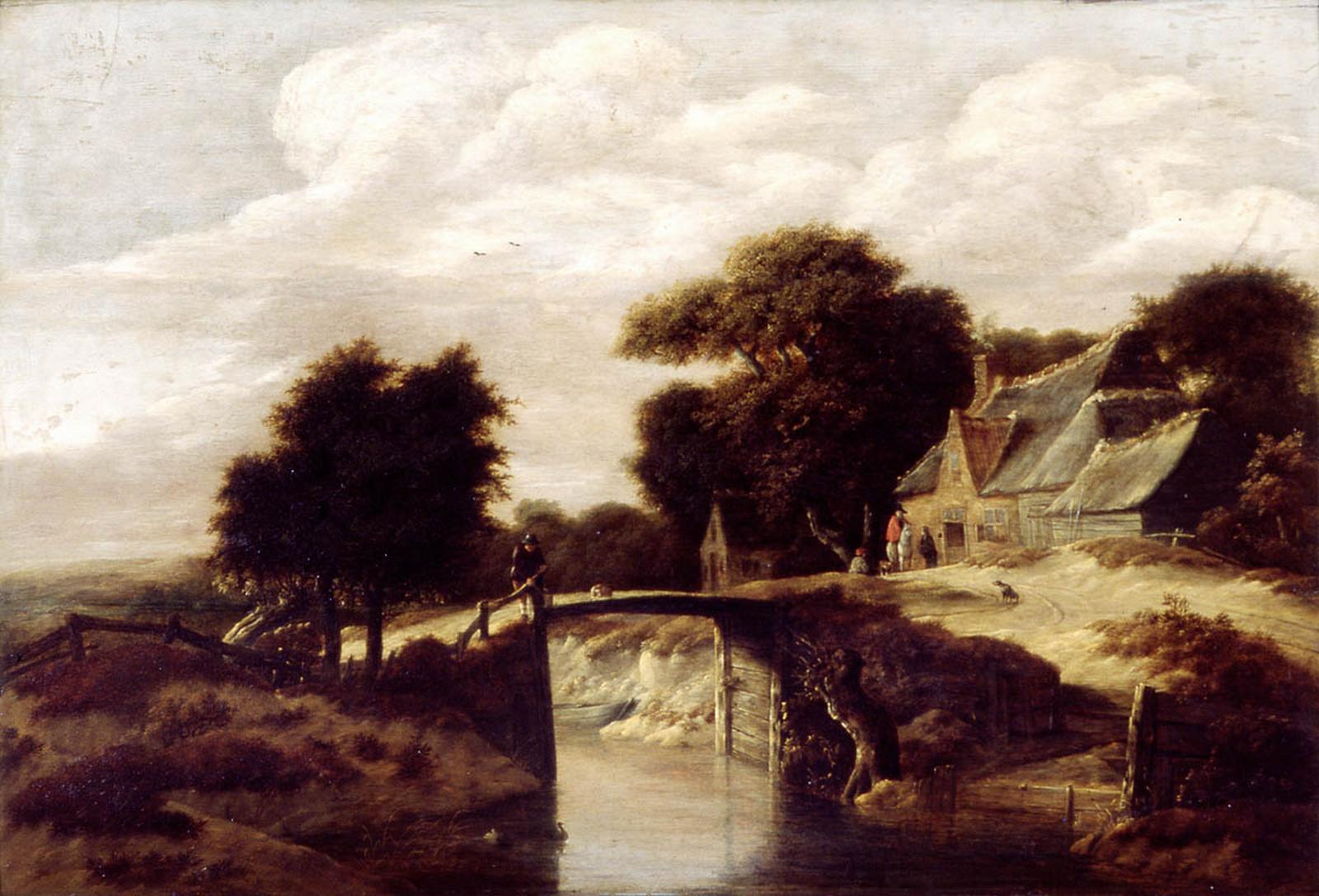
- Artist: Gillis Rombouts
- Completion date: undated
- Medium: oil painting on panel (oak)
- Movement: Dutch Golden Age painting Landscape painting
- Subject: A wooden bridge over a canal
- Dimensions: 70 cm × 104 cm (28 in × 41 in)
- Location: Musée des Beaux-Arts, Strasbourg
- Accession: 1899

The Little Bridge is an undated landscape painting by the Dutch painter Gillis Rombouts. It is now in the Musée des Beaux-Arts of Strasbourg, France. Its inventory number is 423.

Writing in 1894, the specialist Cornelis Hofstede de Groot described this painting as one of Rombout's masterpieces. At that time, it belonged to the collection of Martin Schubart in Dresden. In the year of Schubart's death, 1899, the collection was sold at an auction in Munich, where Georg Dehio bought the painting on behalf of the Strasbourg museum, for 2,900 Mark.

The Little Bridge is signed but not dated. It depicts a little wooden bridge over a canal, in which some ducks are swimming. The largest house on the right has been identified as an inn.
