= Catharina Jacoba Abrahamina Enschedé =

Dutch painter

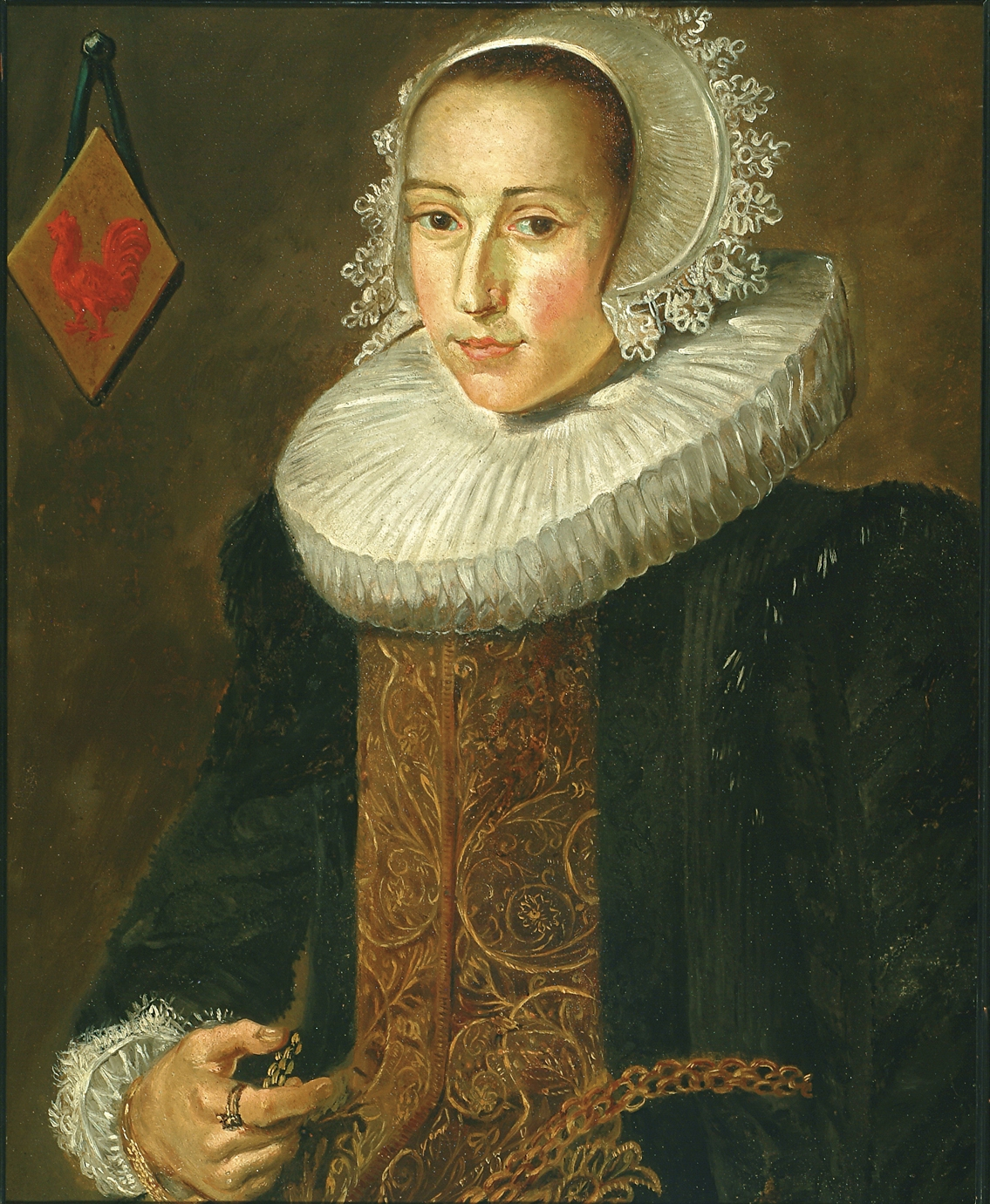
Her copy of Hals' portrait of Aletta Hanemans in her bridal dress

Catharina Jacoba Abrahamina Enschedé (1828 – 1883) was a 19th-century Dutch painter.

== Biography ==
She was born in Haarlem as the sister of the later art collector, city archivist, and museum consultant Adriaan Justus Enschedé. She was probably influenced by him as well as her artistic aunts Sandrina Christina Elisabeth Enschedé and Christina Gerarda Enschedé. She made a copy around 1870 of the Frans Hals portrait of Aletta Hanemans for the Frans Hals museum. She meant it as a souvenir because the Hals portrait which had been shown in Haarlem was sold in Amsterdam in 1877 and later moved to the Hague as part of the painting collection of the newly refurbished Mauritshuis in 1880. This copy was left by her to her brother A.J. who was an informal director of the young Haarlem museum at the time, and in 1896 it came into the collection by official bequest.

Besides her two aunts, her nieces Edzardina Jacoba Tjarda van Starkenborgh Stachouwer-Enschedé, and Adriana Maria Enschedé were also artists.

She died in Bloemendaal.
