= Frans de Momper =

Flemish landscape painter

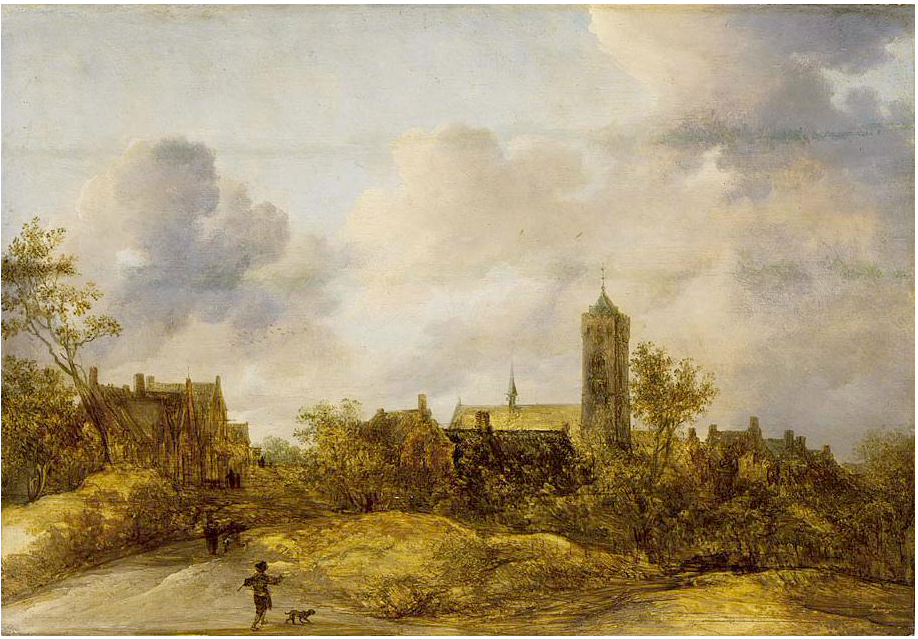
Dune landscape with travellers on a path near a town

Frans de Momper (born on 17 October 1603 – died between 18 September 1660 and 18 September 1661) was a Flemish landscape painter who, after training in Antwerp, worked for a while in the Dutch Republic. Here he was exposed to the work of Dutch landscape painters such as Jan van Goyen. His later paintings prefigure the imaginative landscapes of Hercules Segers.

== Life ==
Frans de Momper was born in Antwerp as the son of the landscape painter Jan de Momper (II). The de Momper family was a prominent family of landscape painters and printmakers, originally from Bruges, which had settled in Antwerp in the 16th century. His brother Philips de Momper (II) would also become a painter who worked in Italy and the Dutch Republic. Jan de Momper may also have been his brother. He was a nephew of the prominent landscape painter Joos de Momper.

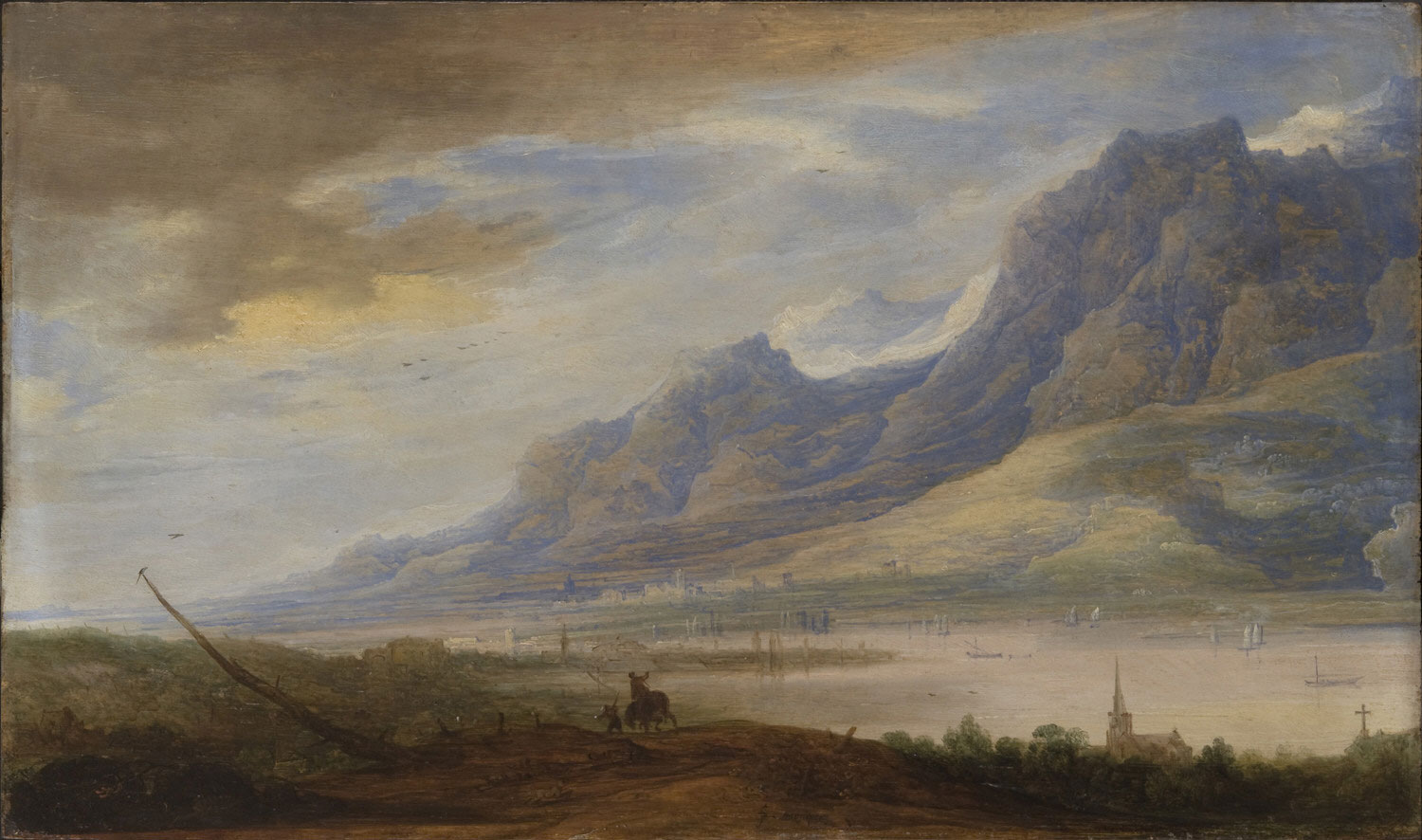
Mountainous Landscape with a River

Frans de Momper was registered as a master at the Antwerp Guild of Saint Luke in 1629. He remained active in Antwerp until he moved to work in the Dutch Republic after the death of his wife Catherina Beucker in 1646. He is first recorded in The Hague in 1647. He was in 1648 in Haarlem where in that year he became a member of the local Guild of Saint Luke. He is recorded in Amsterdam in the period 1649–1650. The artist had returned to Antwerp by 1650 where he remained active for the remainder of his life.

Frans de Momper died in Antwerp between 18 September 1660 and 18 September 1661 as his death duties were paid at the Antwerp Guild of Saint Luke during that period. He had entered into a contract drawn up by notary H. Trilsma, pursuant to which he agreed to send for sale to Hamburg in 1662 some paintings which the servant of the fair undertook to sell. On 6 October 1662, his brother Philips de Momper (II) who was acting as guardian for his children and heirs, authorized a boatman to demand from the servant of the fair Dirck Ulbrecht in Hamburg the restitution of all the paintings that Frans de Momper had consigned to him for sale.

== Work ==
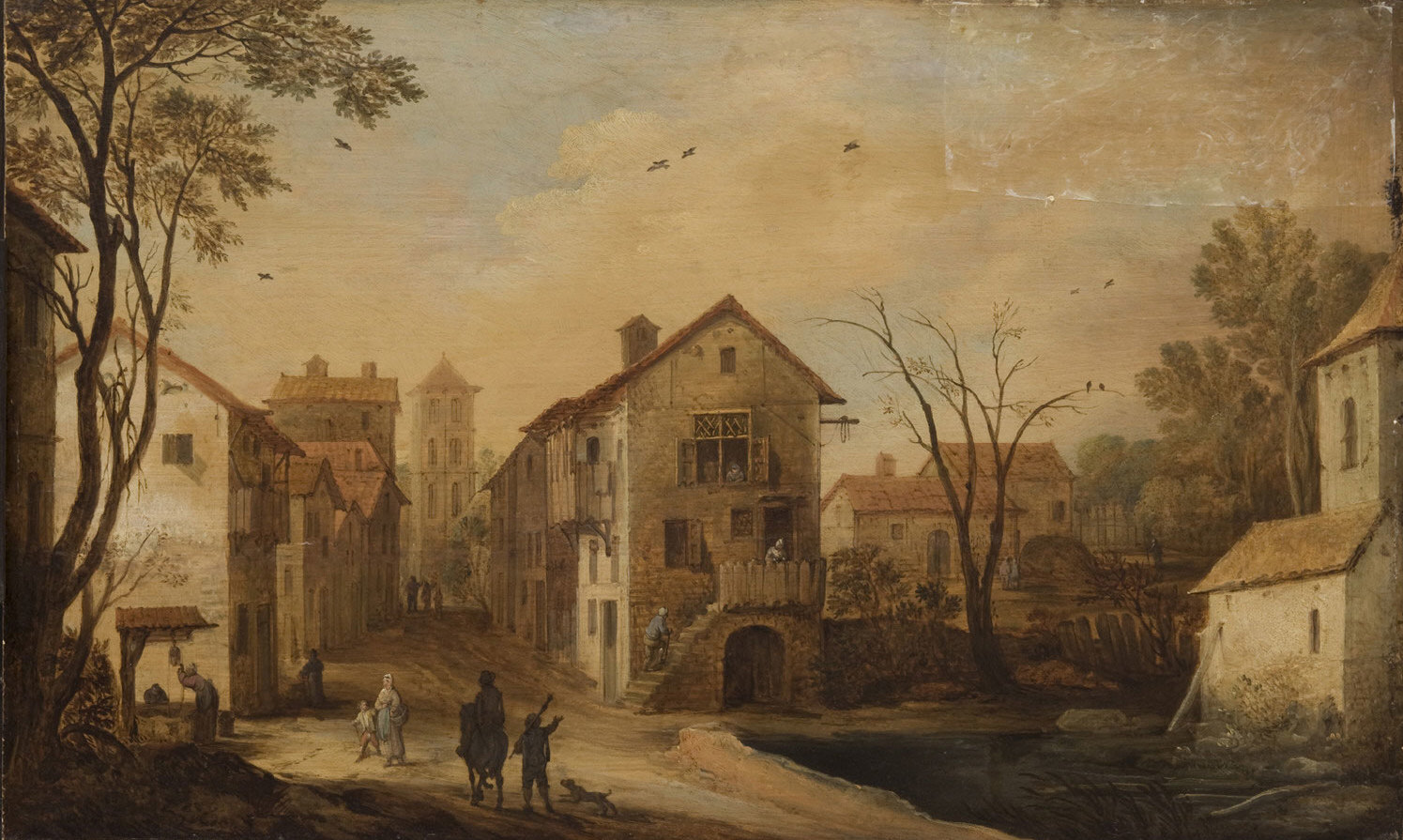
Street in an Italian village

Frans de Momper was a painter and draughtsman of landscapes including winter landscapes, beach landscapes, river landscapes, rural scenes and views of cities.

His early works were in the style of his uncle Joos de Momper and the de Momper workshop. This style was derived from the Brueghel tradition of landscape paintings offering a wide, panoramic view with figures but de Momper's paintings used a lower perspective. Because of the similarity in style, works by Frans de Momper have repeatedly been attributed to his better known uncle Joos de Momper. Even so, Frans' style distinguished itself early on from that of his uncle through its more painterly manner. This painterly approach only appears in his uncle's late work. Frans applied the brushstrokes in an even manner, not altering the character of his brushwork irrespective of whether he was rendering people, buildings or trees. As a result, his compositions create a pronouncedly homogenous impression, since no specific elements are emphasized and each detail remains subordinated to the work's overall painterly impression.

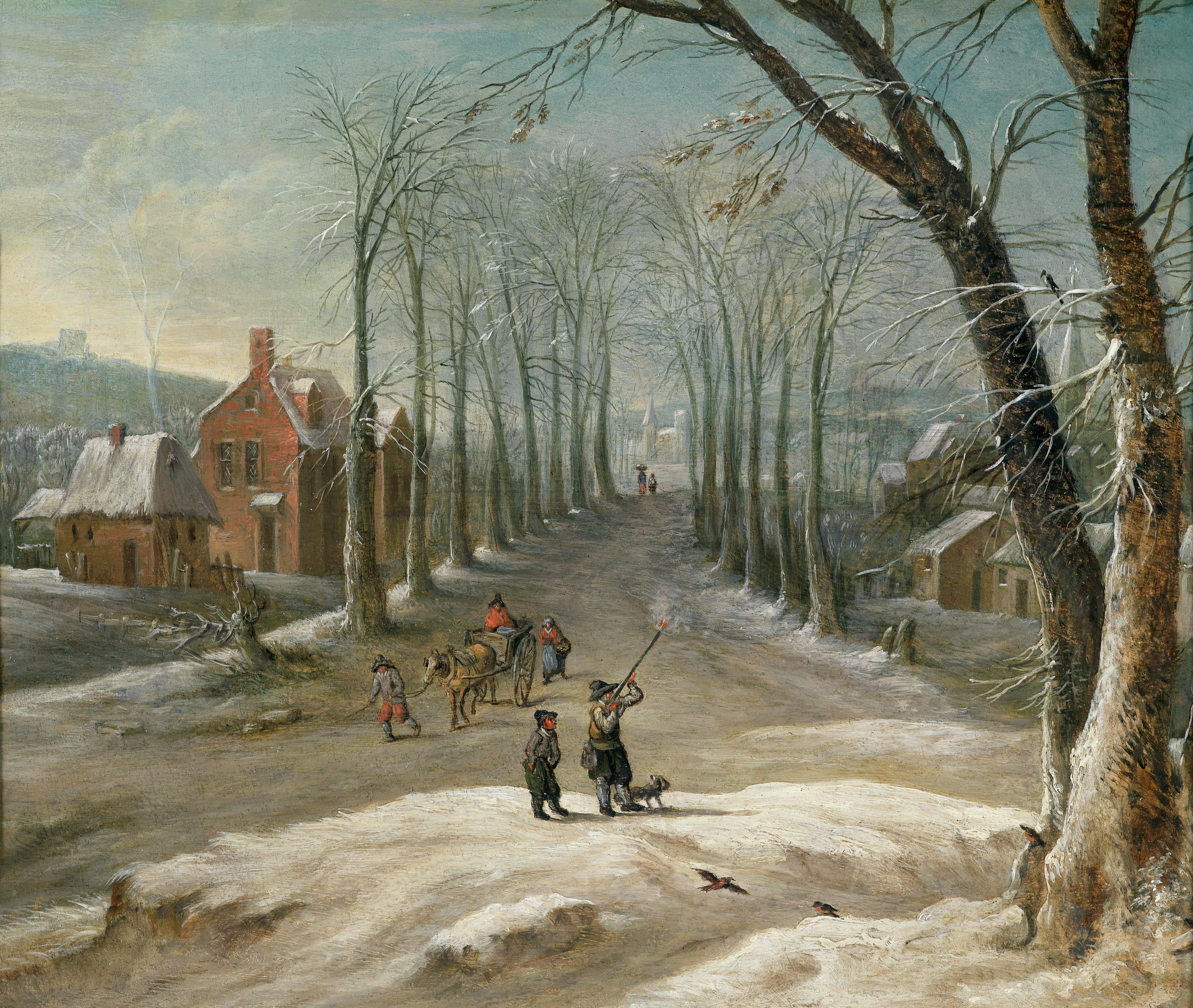
Winter landscape with men fowling and market sellers

During his stay in the Dutch Republic Frans de Momper was influenced by the landscapes of Jan van Goyen. Jan van Goyen's works are characterized by a monochrome palette and horizontally arranged flat landscape scenery. De Momper's works after his return to Antwerp in 1650 showed this influence. He thus painted monochrome landscapes in the manner of Jan van Goyen. Paintings such as the Mountainous Landscape with a river (c. 1640; Philadelphia Museum of Art) prefigure the imaginative landscapes of Hercules Segers.

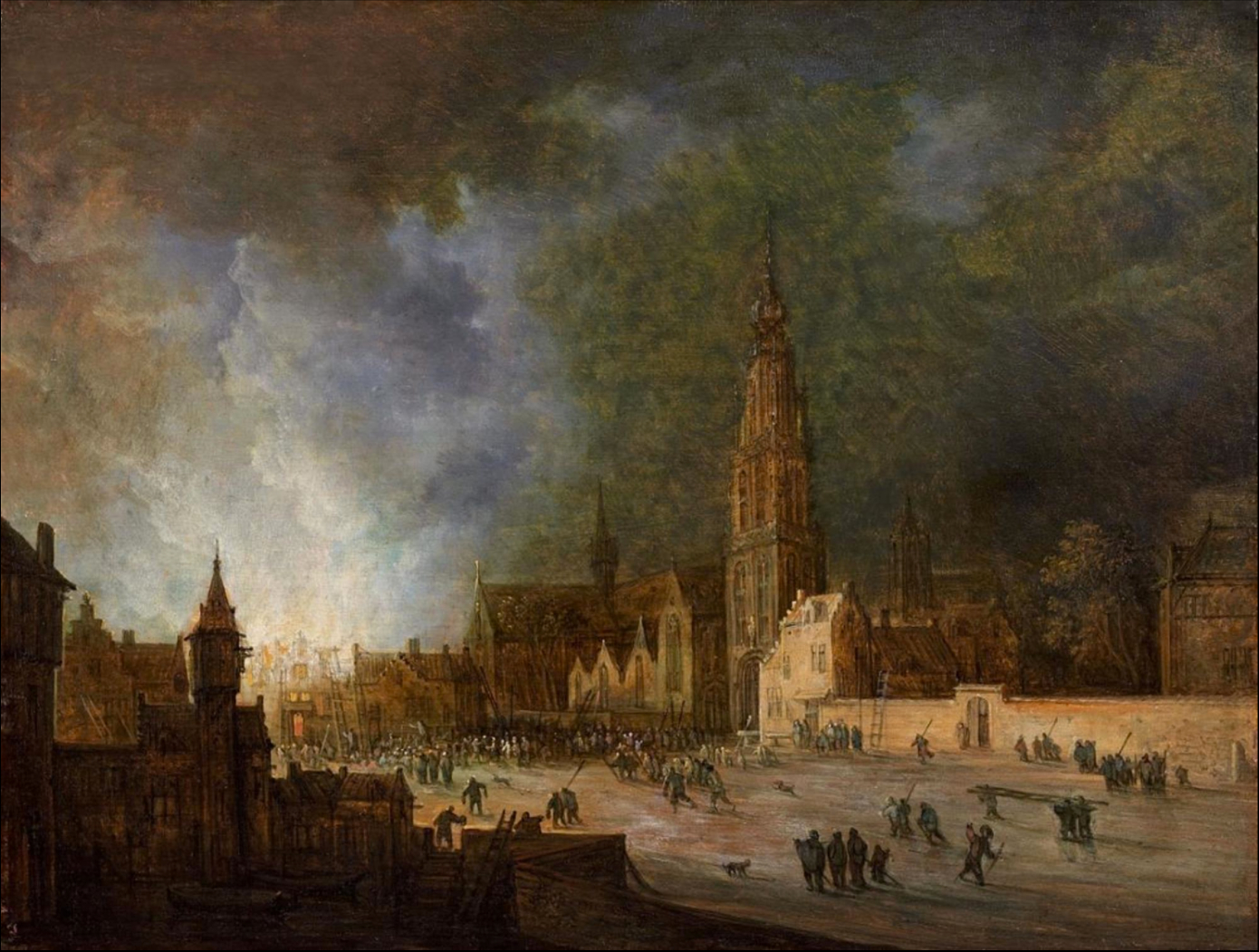
A fire near the Grote Kerk in Breda

Frans executed a number of variations on the theme of a river landscape with boats and village. In his late paintings he combined the low horizon and light-filled sky of the contemporary Dutch school of tonal landscape painting, with the delicacy of the figures, feathery trees and buildings of the Italian-Flemish tradition of which his uncle Joos was a leading representative.

A large number of de Momper's paintings depict winter landscapes in which he built on the examples set by Paul Bril and Jan Brueghel the Elder in the late sixteenth and early seventeenth century.
