= De Momper family =

Flemish family of painters and printmakers

The family de Momper was a Flemish family of painters and printmakers active in the 16th and 17th century. The family originated in Bruges but had settled in Antwerp by the 1550s. Members of the family include:

- Frans de Momper (1603–1660), Flemish painter
- Jan de Momper the Elder (fl 1512–16), painter in Bruges
- Jan de Momper (16 August 1614 or 1617 - 1684/1704), landscape painter
- Joos de Momper the Younger (1564–1635), landscape painter, engraver and draughtsman
- Philips de Momper the Elder (1598–1634), landscape painter
- Bartholomeus de Momper the Elder (1535–between 1559 and 1597), publisher, printer, draughtsman and art dealer
