= Bartholomeus de Momper the Elder =

Flemish publisher

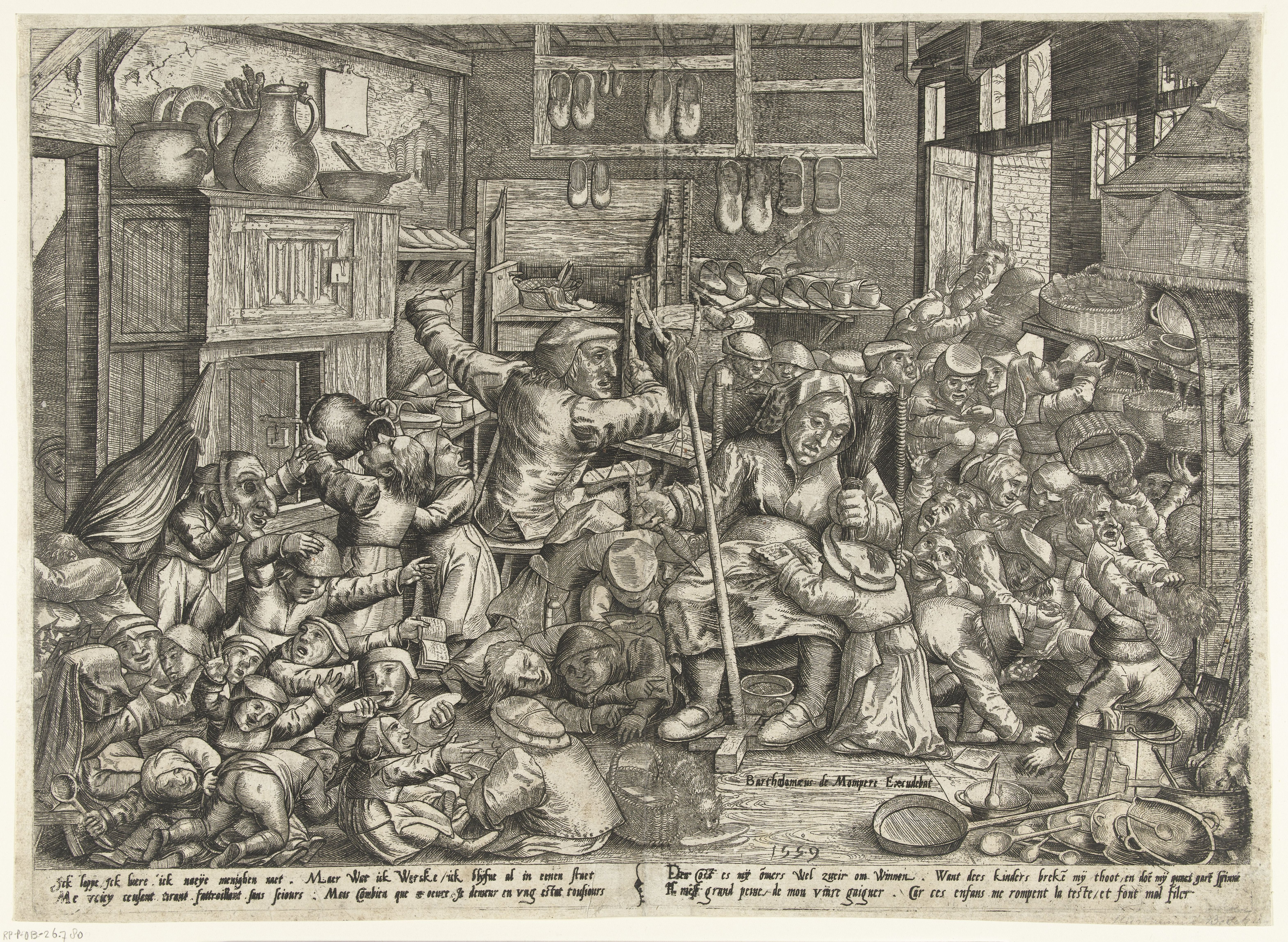
The cobbler and the spinster as school masters by Pieter van der Borcht the Elder

Bartholomeus de Momper (I) or Bartholomeus de Momper the Elder (Antwerp, 1535 – Antwerp, between 1595 and 1597) was a Flemish publisher, printer, draughtsman and art dealer. He was a member of de Momper family, a prominent family of landscape painters and printmakers, originally from Bruges, which had settled in Antwerp in the 16th century.

== Life ==
Bartholomeus de Momper was born in 1535 in Antwerp as the son of Joos de Momper the Elder and Anna de Zuttere. His father was a painter and dealer in paintings and linen. The de Momper family was a family of artists, originally from Bruges, which had settled in Antwerp in the early 16th century and became mainly known for publishing and landscape painting. Bartholomeus de Momper learned the painting and art dealing trade from his father. He was registered as a master painter in the Antwerp Guild of St. Luke in the Guild year 1554.

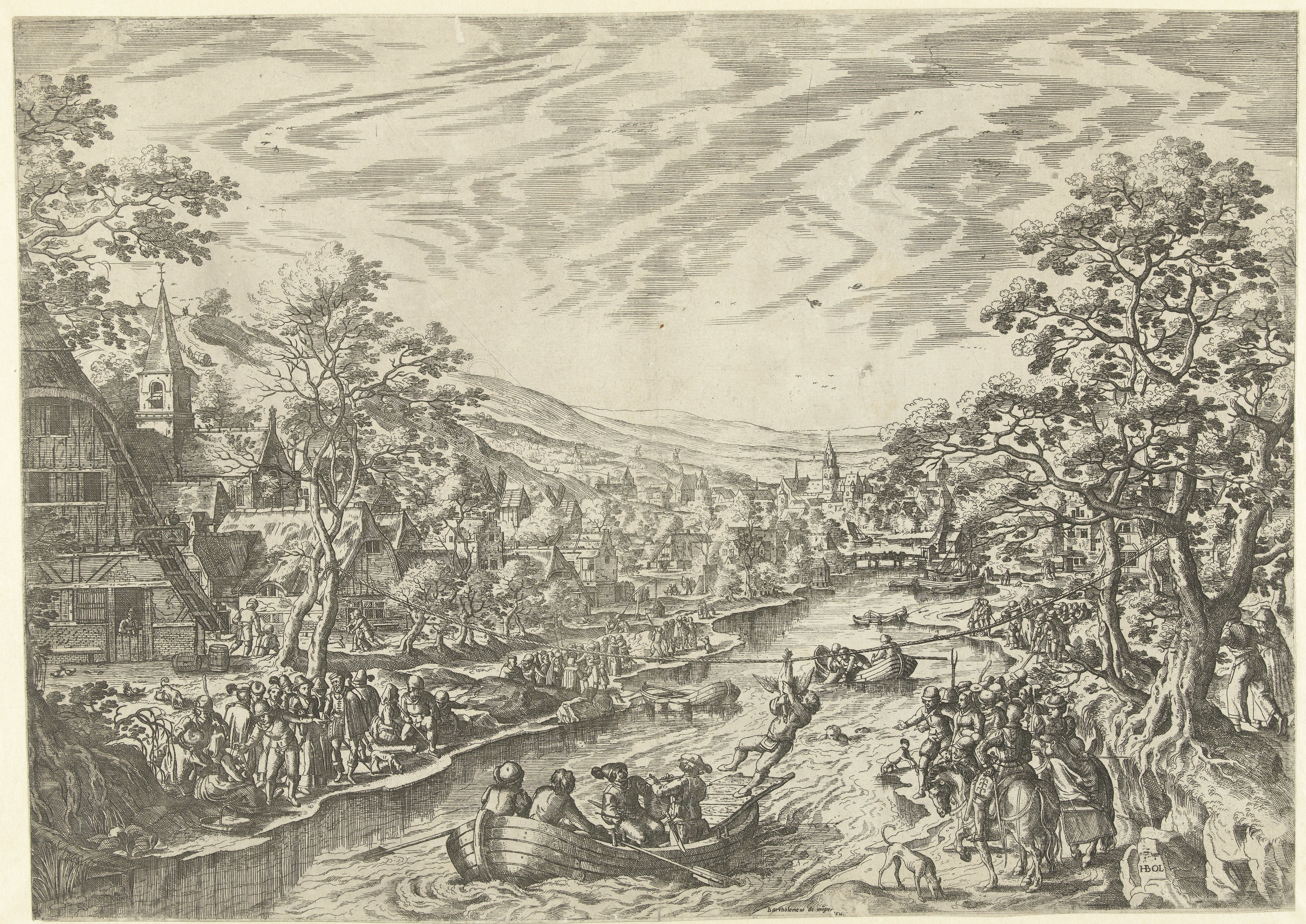
The pulling of the goose by Hans Bol

When his father died in early 1559, he took over his business. He married Suzanna Halfroose on 16 November 1559. The couple had seven children of whom three girls and four boys. Their son Joos de Momper the Younger trained as a painter with his father and became a prominent landscape painter.

Bartholomeus de Momper was a member of the Antwerp mercer's guild in 1562, which allowed him to deal in pigments. Bartholomeus de Momper was principally an art dealer and rented the Schilderij Pand der Borze (Painting house at the bourse) as well as the art stalls at the trade fair. The Schilderij Pand had been established in 1540. It was under the management of the Antwerp city government. It comprised 100 art stalls on the second floor of the bourse. It operated throughout the year in contrast to the art stalls at the periodical trade fairs. Art dealers could rent the stalls to sell paintings. On 21 February 1565, Bartholomeus de Momper entered with the city government into an agreement for the lease of the Schilderij Pand der Borze. The term of the lease was three years and the rent was particularly high at 1,848 guilders per year. It was the highest annual rent ever paid for the lease.

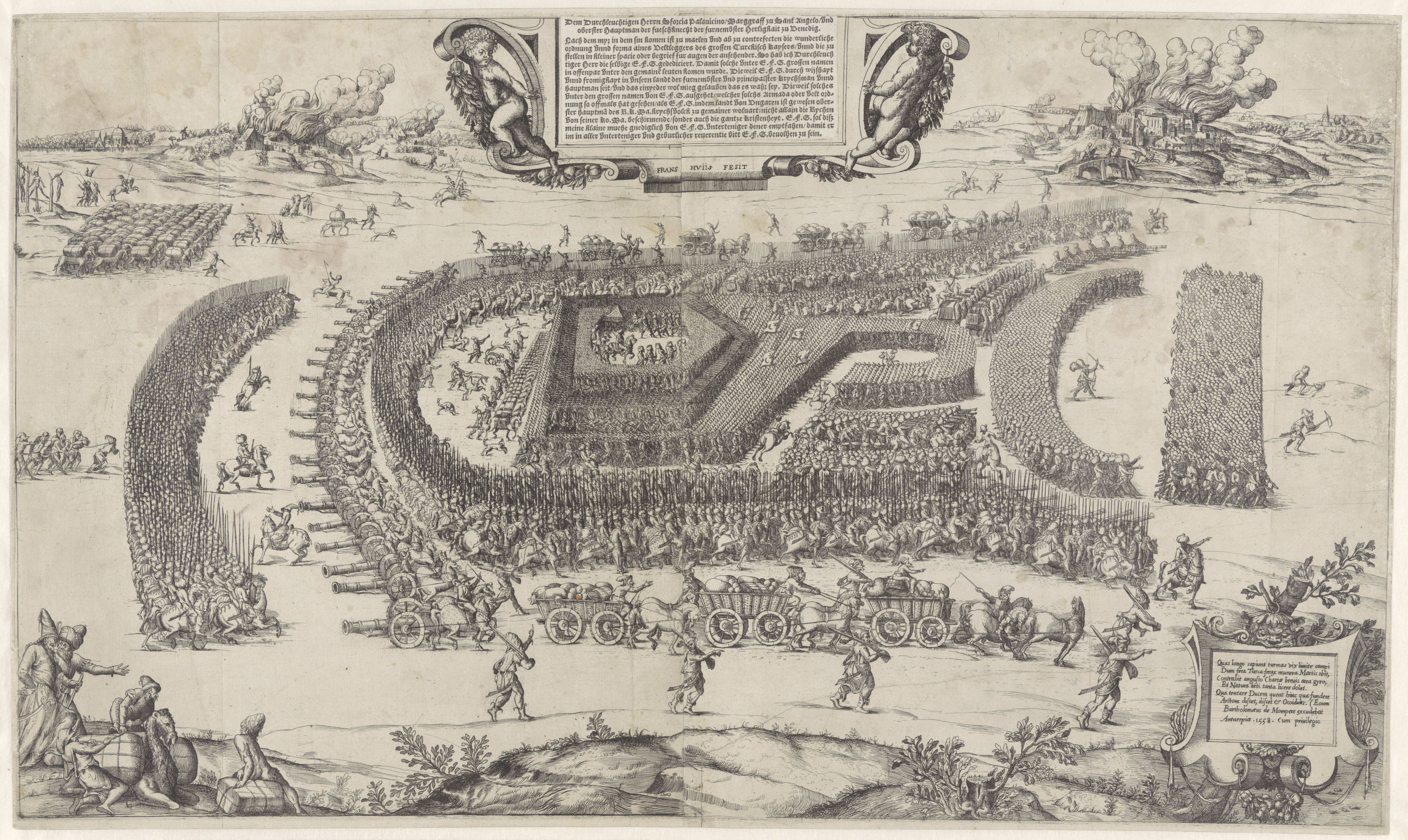
The marching order of the Ottoman army

Bartholomeus de Momper's business suffered terribly as a result of the Sack of Antwerp. On 4 November 1576, mutinying Spanish tercios of the Army of Flanders began the sack of Antwerp, leading to three days of horror among the population of the city, which was the cultural, economic and financial center of the Low Countries. Some 7,000 lives and a great deal of property were lost. The savagery of the sack led the provinces of the Low Countries to unite against the Spanish crown. The devastation also caused Antwerp's decline as the leading city in the region and paved the way for Amsterdam's rise. This rampage of Spanish soldiers in Antwerp caused significant financial loss to Bartholomeus de Momper. All his art stalls were sacked and his residence was plundered. As the tenant of the Schilderij Pand which he leased from the city government, Bartholomeus de Momper petitioned for a waiver of the rental payments on the ground that he was unable to operate his business for a while. The city magistrate only agreed to grant a waiver of the rental payment for half a year and instructed de Momper to ensure that his sub-lessees would return to operate their business in the Schilderij Pand. Bartholomeus de Momper resumed trade at seven art stalls in January 1577. Not long after, a new threat arose in Antwerp when German soldiers started to plunder the city and broke into the exchange where they pillaged all they could lay their hands on. After the Fall of Antwerp in 1585 de Momper had difficulty finding tenants for the stalls in the Schilderij Pand, but not because the art trade was in decline. The reason was that art dealers were running their trade on a lower floor of the bourse where they could display their paintings without having to rent the more expensive stalls in the Schilderij Pand from de Momper.

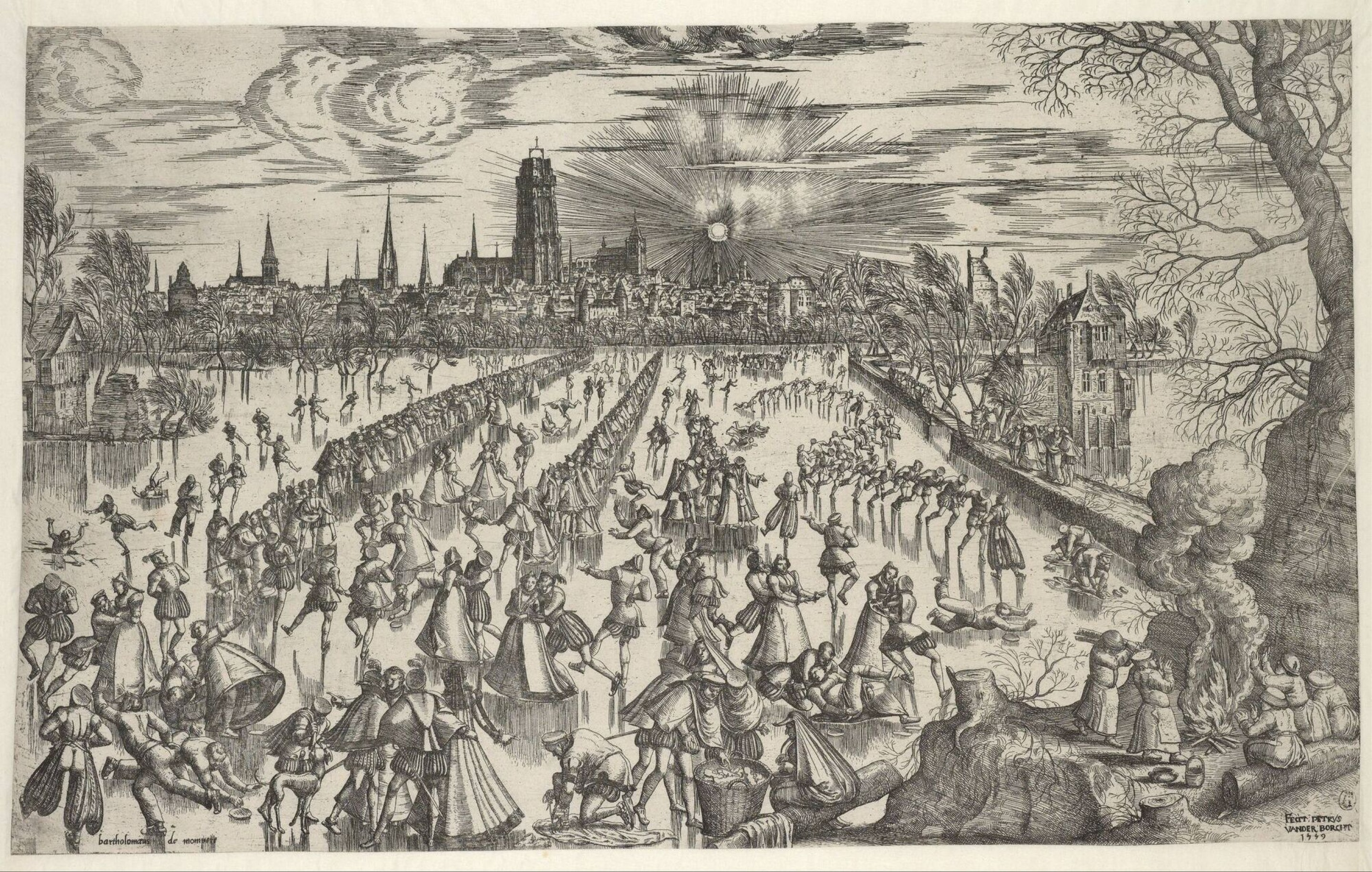
Fun on the Ice in Mechelen

Bartholomeus de Momper became deacon of the Guild of St Luke in 1581. In 1582, he entered into an agreement with Volcxken Diericx, a Flemish printmaker and publisher and the widow of Hieronymus Cock. Under the agreement, Diericx would supply de Momper with loose and bound prints and maps from her stock for him to sell on her behalf for a commission. Among the works de Momper received from Dierix were 51 copies of two books of landscape prints, a genre apparently popular at the time.

Bartholomeus de Momper died in Antwerp between 1595 and 1597.

== Activity ==
Bartholomeus de Momper trained as a painter and draughtsman and was also an engraver, but appears to have been mainly a publisher and dealer of prints.

He published works engraved by leading engravers of his time such as Hans Bol, Pieter van der Borcht the Elder, Frans Hogenberg and Frans Huys. The works included reproductions of paintings of Flemish artists, as well as genre scenes, topographical views and historical subjects.
