= Dirck van Santvoort =

Dutch Golden Age painter (1609–1680)

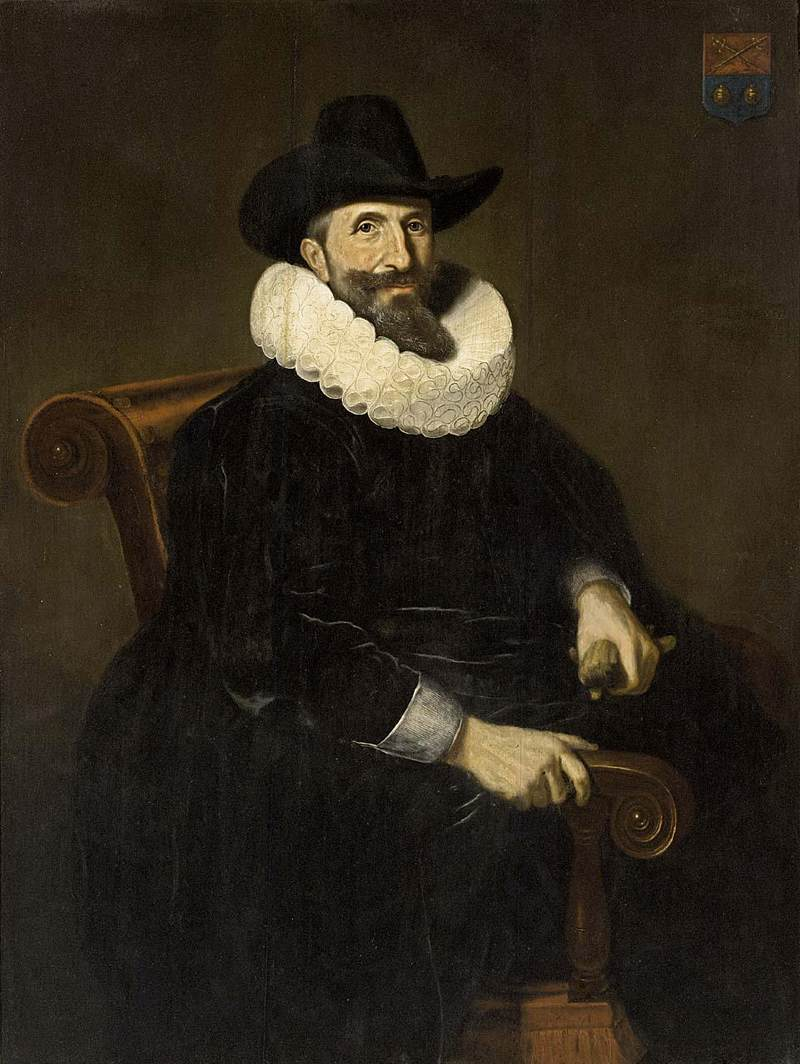
Portrait of Elias van Cuelen

Dirck Dircksz van Santvoort (bapt. 16 December 1609 – bur. 9 March 1680) was a Dutch Golden Age painter.

== Biography ==
Santvoort was born and died in Amsterdam, where he married in 1648 and had a son named Rembrandt. He married a second time in 1657. Though not registered as a Rembrandt pupil, he is considered a member of Rembrandt's school of painting, creating portraits and historical allegories.

He was the brother of the landscape painter Pieter Dircksz Santvoort.

== Known works ==
- Regentesses of the Spinhuis, 1638
