= Isaac Ouwater =

Dutch painter

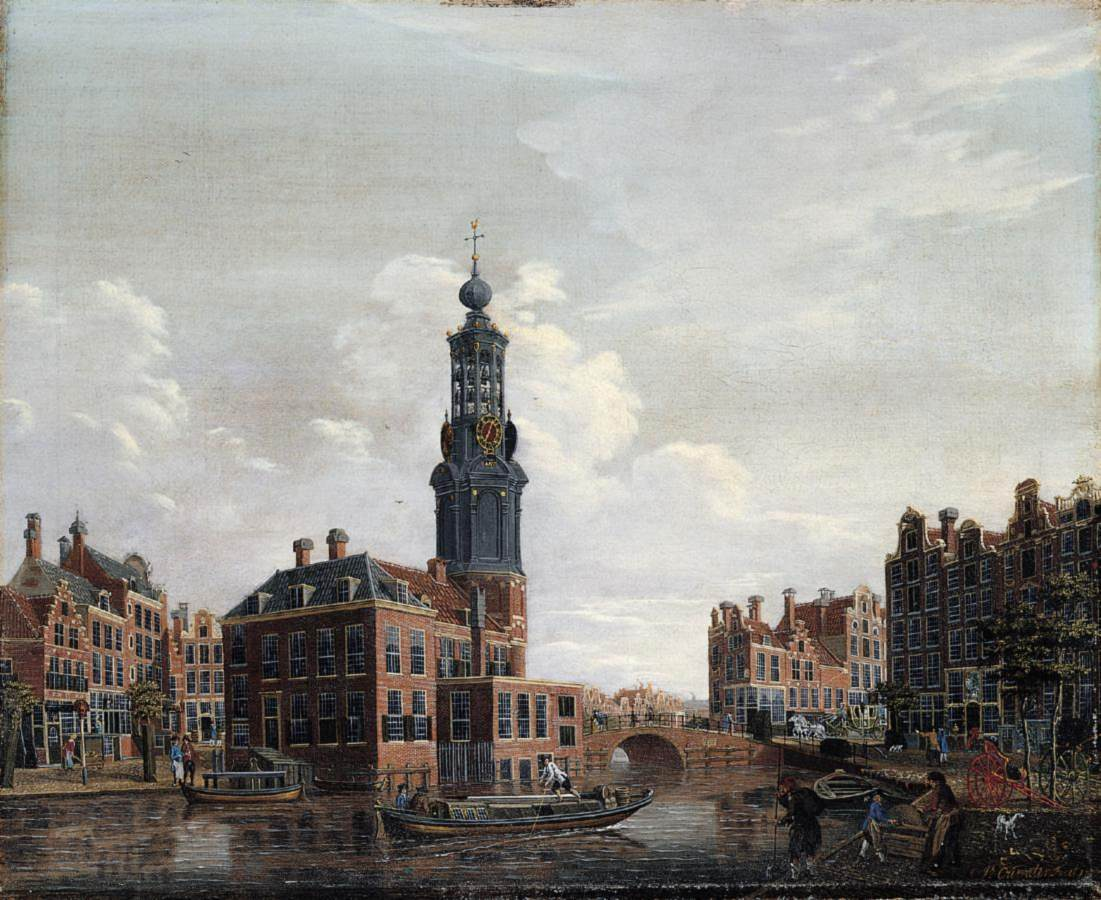
View of the Singel with the Munttoren in Amsterdam

Isaac Ouwater (1748, Amsterdam – 1793, Amsterdam) was an 18th-century painter of cityscapes from the Dutch Republic.

== Biography ==
It seems his father was a landscape painter and a widower before when Isaac was born. He was baptized in the Amstelkerk, although his parents had not married yet. The family lived at Prinsengracht, when he married in 1772. He also worked in Haarlem, Delft, Hoorn, Edam and Utrecht.
