= Pieter Dircksz Santvoort =

Dutch painter

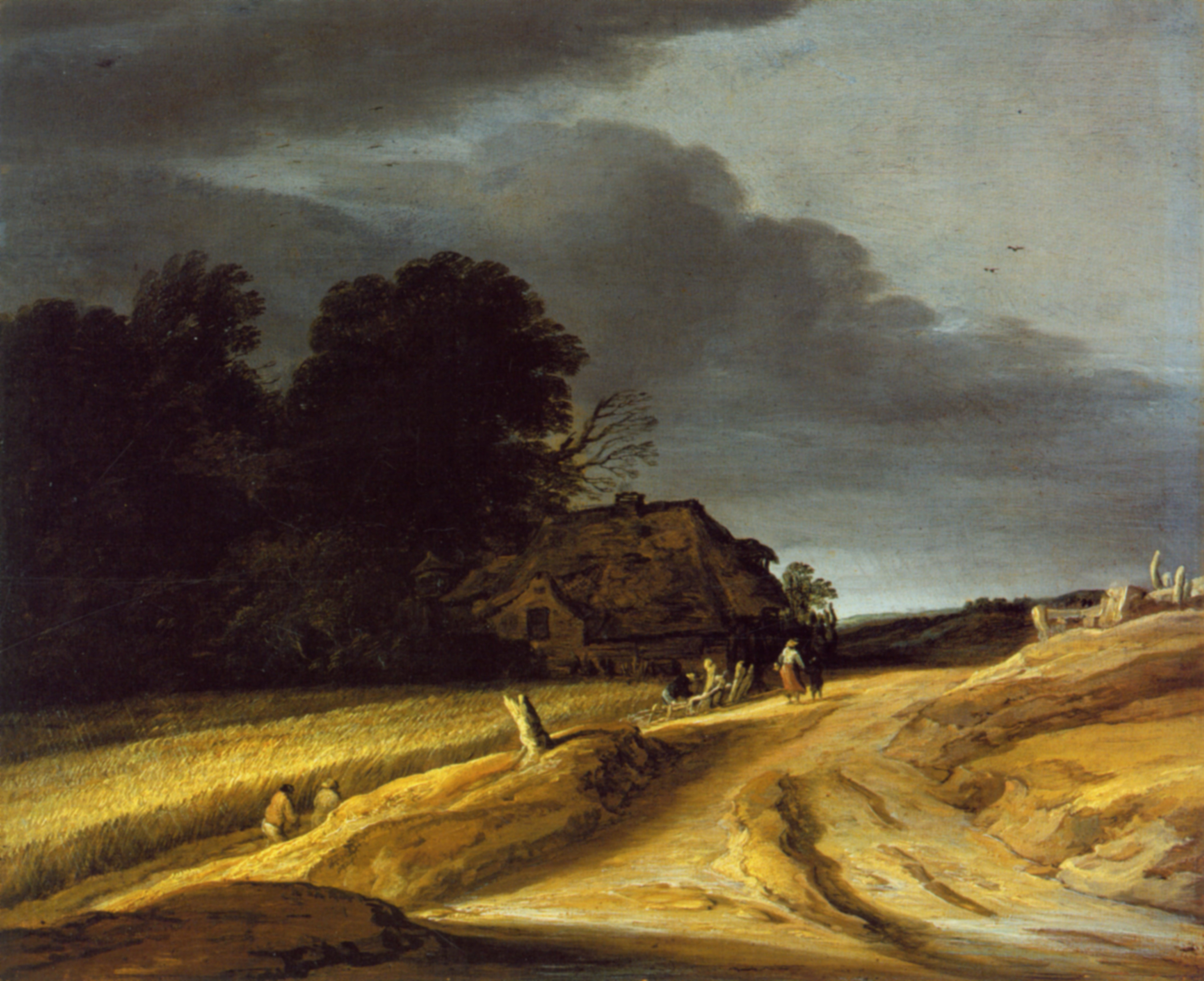
Dune landscape with farmhouse and figures, 1625

Pieter Dircksz. van Santvoort (1604–1635), was a Dutch Golden Age landscape painter.

He was born in Amsterdam and is known for landscapes in the manner of Esaias van de Velde.

He died in Amsterdam. He was the brother of the portrait painter Dirck van Santvoort.
