= Salomon Rombouts =

Dutch painter

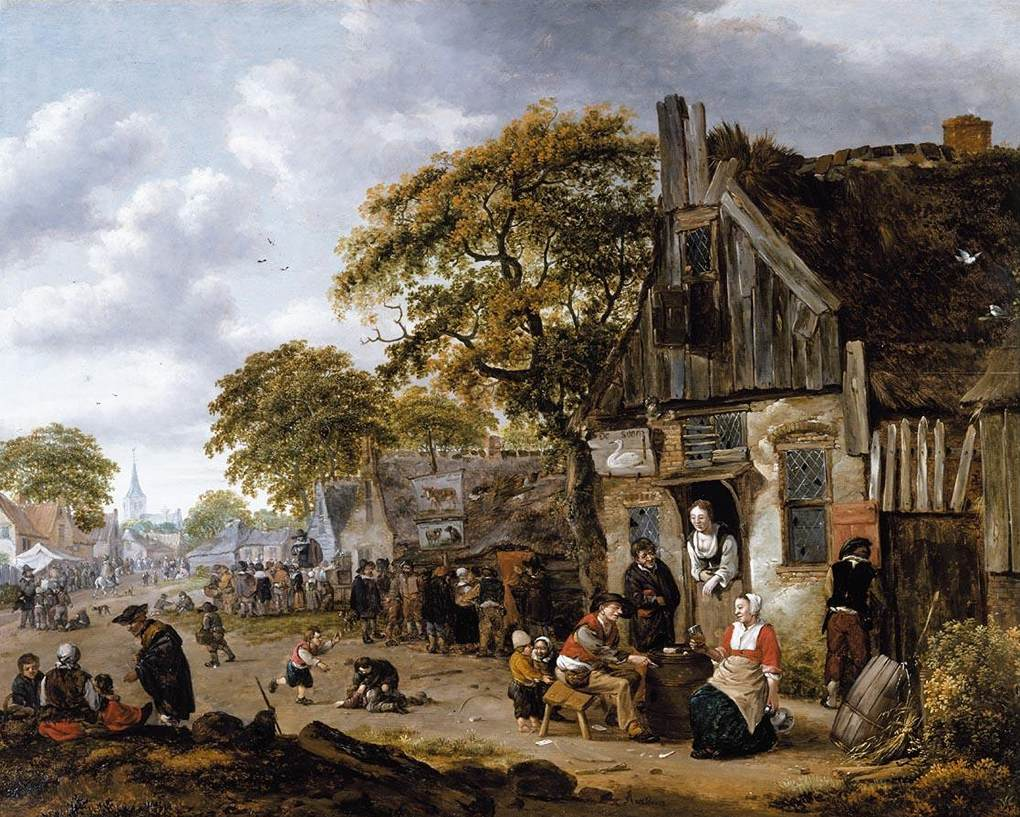
A Village Street Scene

Salomon Rombouts (1655 – ca. 1702) was a Dutch Golden Age painter.

== Biography ==
Rombouts was born in Haarlem. According to the RKD he was the son of the landscape painter Gillis Rombouts and, like his father, painted landscapes and beach scenes. His parents had had two sons before him that were also named Salomon who died in infancy, leading to some confusion in the literature about his date of birth being 1652. He travelled in 1681 to Italy and is registered there in Florence from 1689 to 1700. He died, perhaps in Italy, some time before 1702, when he was recorded as deceased by the painter Vincent van der Vinne's son in his father's list of members of the Haarlem Guild of St. Luke.
