= Gillis Rombouts =

Dutch Golden Age landscape painter

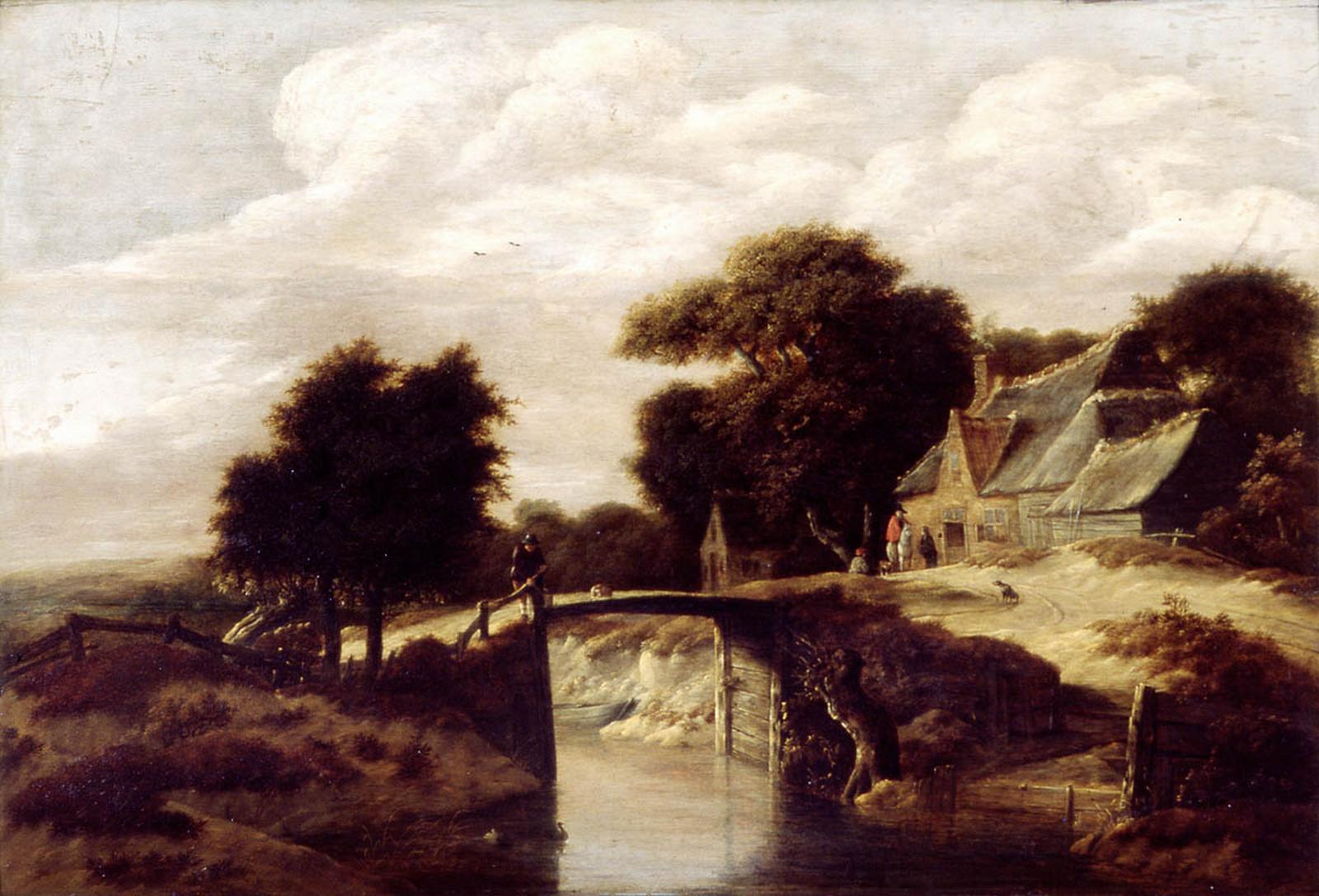
- The Little Bridge, Musée des Beaux-Arts de Strasbourg
- Born: Jacob Isaackszoon van Ruisdael; 1630; Haarlem, Dutch Republic
- Died: 1678 (aged 47–48); Haarlem, Dutch Republic
- Known for: Landscape painting
- Movement: Dutch Golden Age
- Patrons: Salomon van Ruysdael

Gillis Rombouts (1630, Haarlem – 1678, Haarlem), was a Dutch Golden Age landscape painter. He is known for his paintings of genre scenes, historical scenes, landscapes, beaches and winter landscapes.

== Biography ==
According to the RKD he painted landscapes and beach scenes.

He was followed by his son, the painter Salomon Romboutsto whom he probably taught painting.

The artist was influenced by the painter Salomon van Ruysdael.

Gillis Rombouts died in February 1672 in Haarlem and is buried there on February 25, 1672.

== Works ==
- Woodland Landscape, Rijksmuseum, Amsterdam
- Workshop of a weaver, Frans Hals Museum, Haarlem
- Annual Fair, Frans Hals Museum, Haarlem
