= Johannes Huibert Prins =

18th-century painter

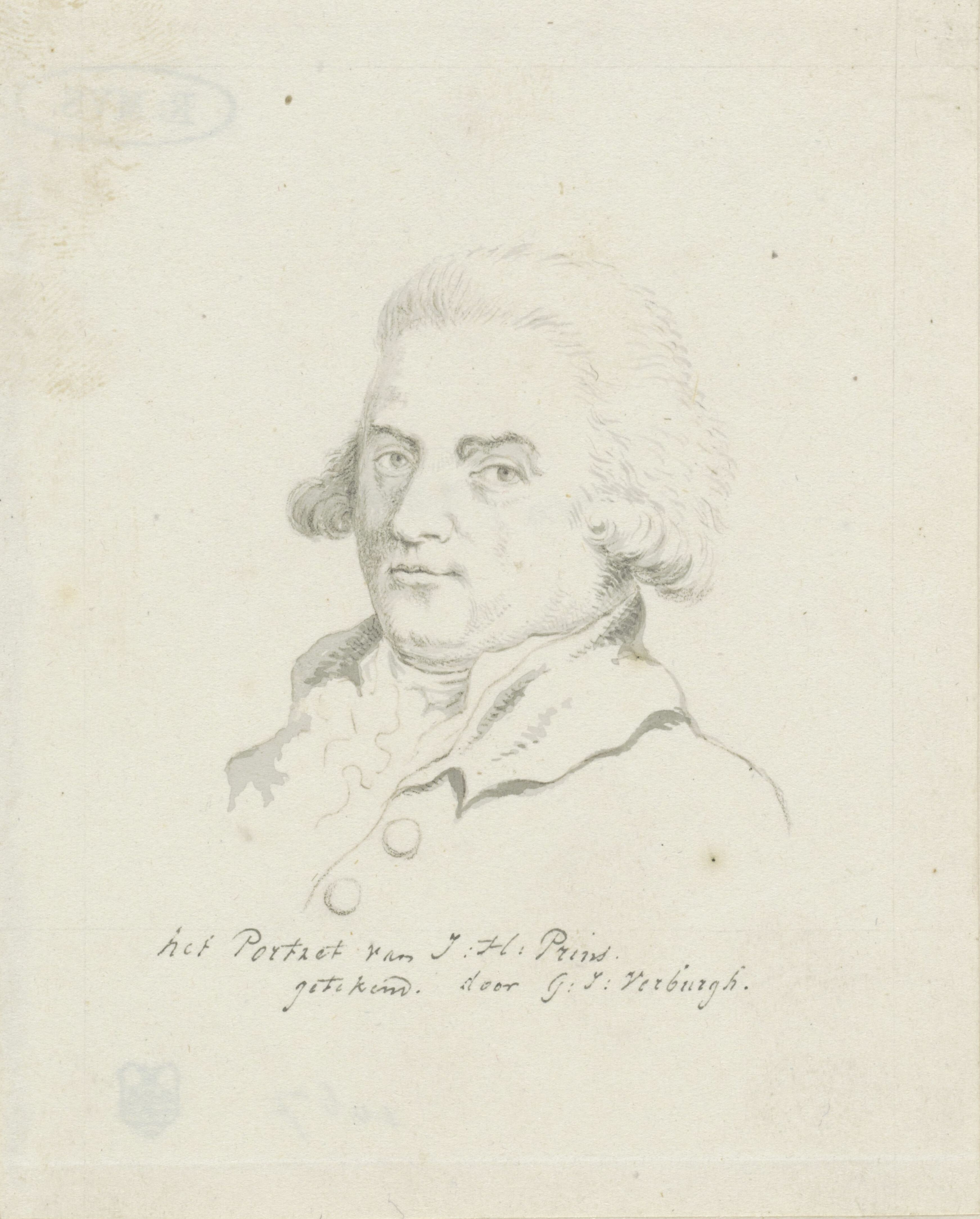
- Portret of Johannes Huibert Prins by Gerardus Johannes Verburgh
- Born: 1756; The Hague, Netherlands
- Died: 1806; Utrecht, Netherlands
- Years active: 1773-1806

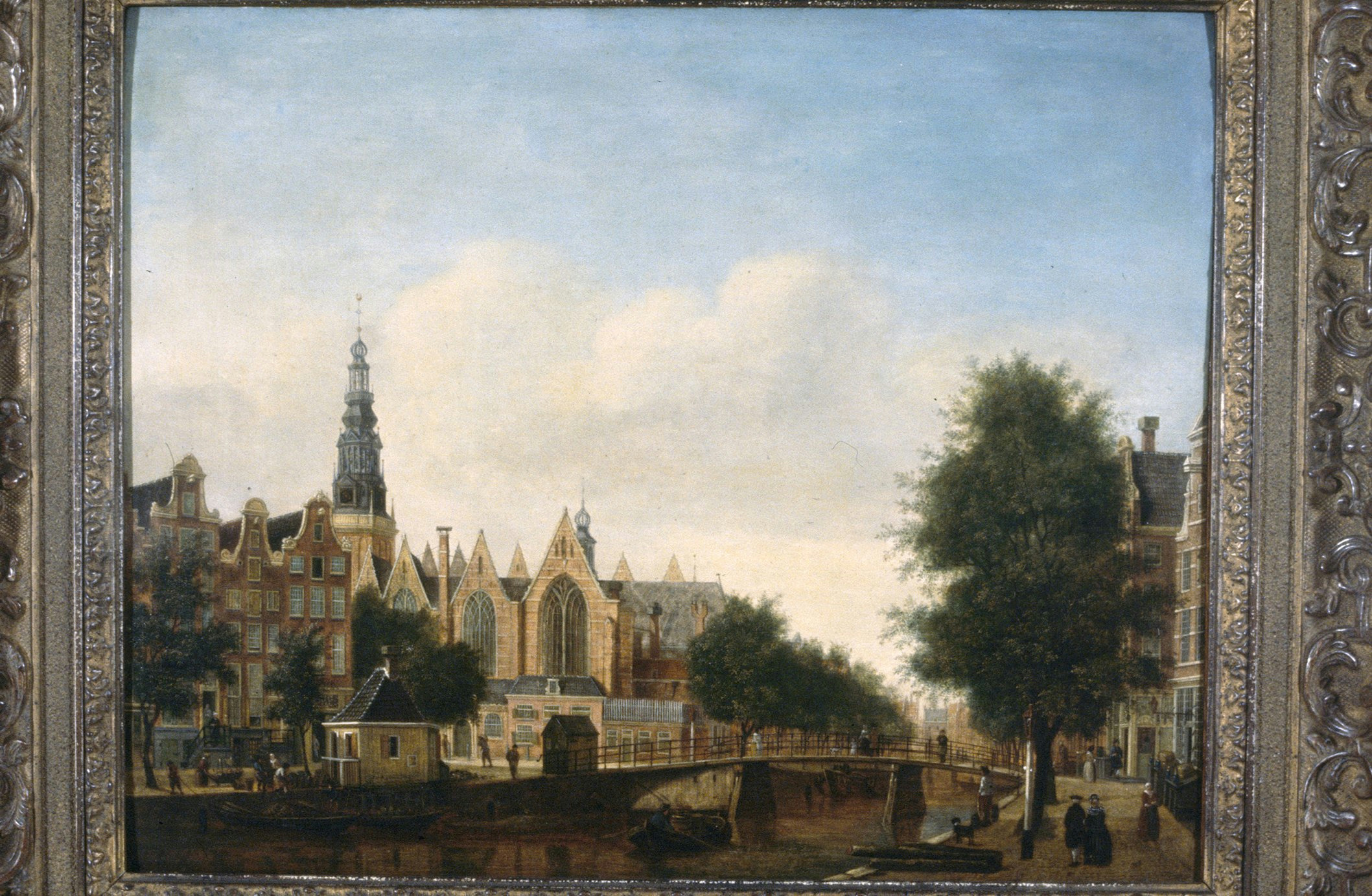
View of the Oudezijds Voorburgwal in Amsterdam

Johannes Huibert Prins (1756–1806), was an 18th-century painter from the Dutch Republic.

Born in The Hague, Johannes Huibert Prins taught himself to paint. According to Jacob Campo Weyerman, his father wanted him to become a doctor and refused to pay for art lessons, but he ignored him and travelled to Paris anyway, sketching cityscapes along the way and making copies of works he found interesting. He became a board member of the Confrerie Pictura in 1785 and is known for his cityscapes.

He died in 1806, in Utrecht.
