= Willem Zijderveld =

Dutch painter

Willem Zijderveld (1796–1840), was a Dutch painter, was born at Amsterdam. In the Haarlem Museum there is a picture by him representing Jan van Oldenbarnevelt presenting to Arent Meyndertsz Fabricius the silver-gilt cup voted to the latter by the States of Holland for his services at the siege of Ostend. Zijderweld died at Amsterdam, 24 December 1840.
