= Christina Gerarda Enschedé =

Dutch painter

- Born: 10 December 1791; Haarlem, Netherlands
- Died: 6 March 1873 (aged 81); Haarlem, Netherlands
- Known for: Painting

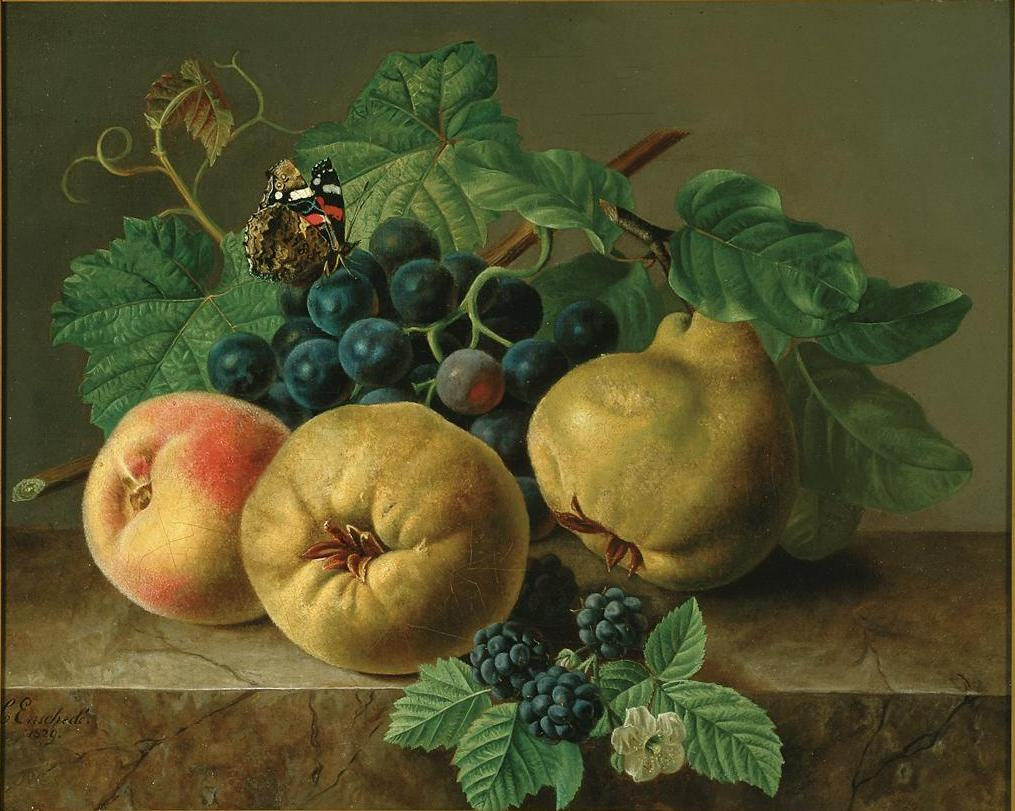
Still life with fruit, 1829

Christina Gerarda Enschedé (10 December 1791 – 6 March 1873) was a Dutch painter.

== Biography ==
She was born in Haarlem as the fifth of nine children and the third daughter of Johannes Enschedé Jr. and Johanna Elisabeth Swaving. After her father's early death in 1799 she became a partner in the family business, but did not take an active part in the daily proceedings. She and her sister Sandrina took drawing lessons and were active in the theater societies of their mother. The Teylers Museum has watercolor paintings by both women. She made paintings of flowers and fruit in the manner of Vincent Jansz van der Vinne and gave one to Jan van Walré in 1829 who wrote a poem about it.

According to the RKD she is known for fruit and flower still life paintings that are mostly dated around 1830. She signed her works C. Enschedé or C.G. Enschedé. Christina had a great wanderlust. Switzerland was her favorite travel destination. Two portfolios with travel sketches of her have been preserved.

She never married, and lived in a house near the family business on the Oude Groenmarkt behind the St. Bavochurch, where she is buried in the family grave.
