= Jan de Momper =

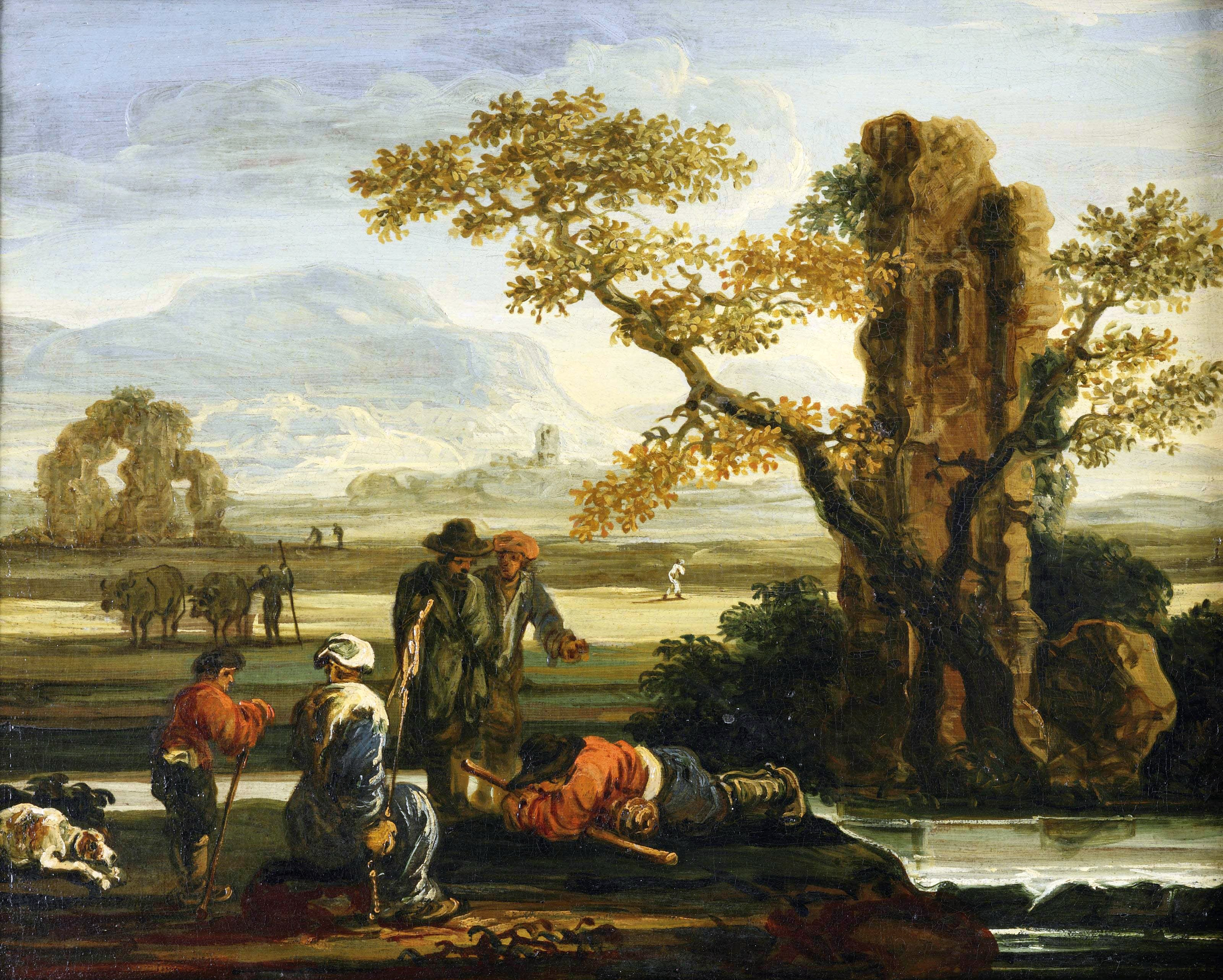
Italianate landscape with herdsmen

Jan de Momper, also known as Giovanni de Momper (16 August 1614 or 1617 - 1684/1704) was a Flemish landscape painter who, after training in Antwerp, had a successful career in Rome where he worked for an elite clientele. The artist was forgotten until his rediscovery in 1959. With his highly expressionist landscapes executed with a very free brush the artist occupies a unique position in the artistic panorama of Baroque Rome.

== Life ==
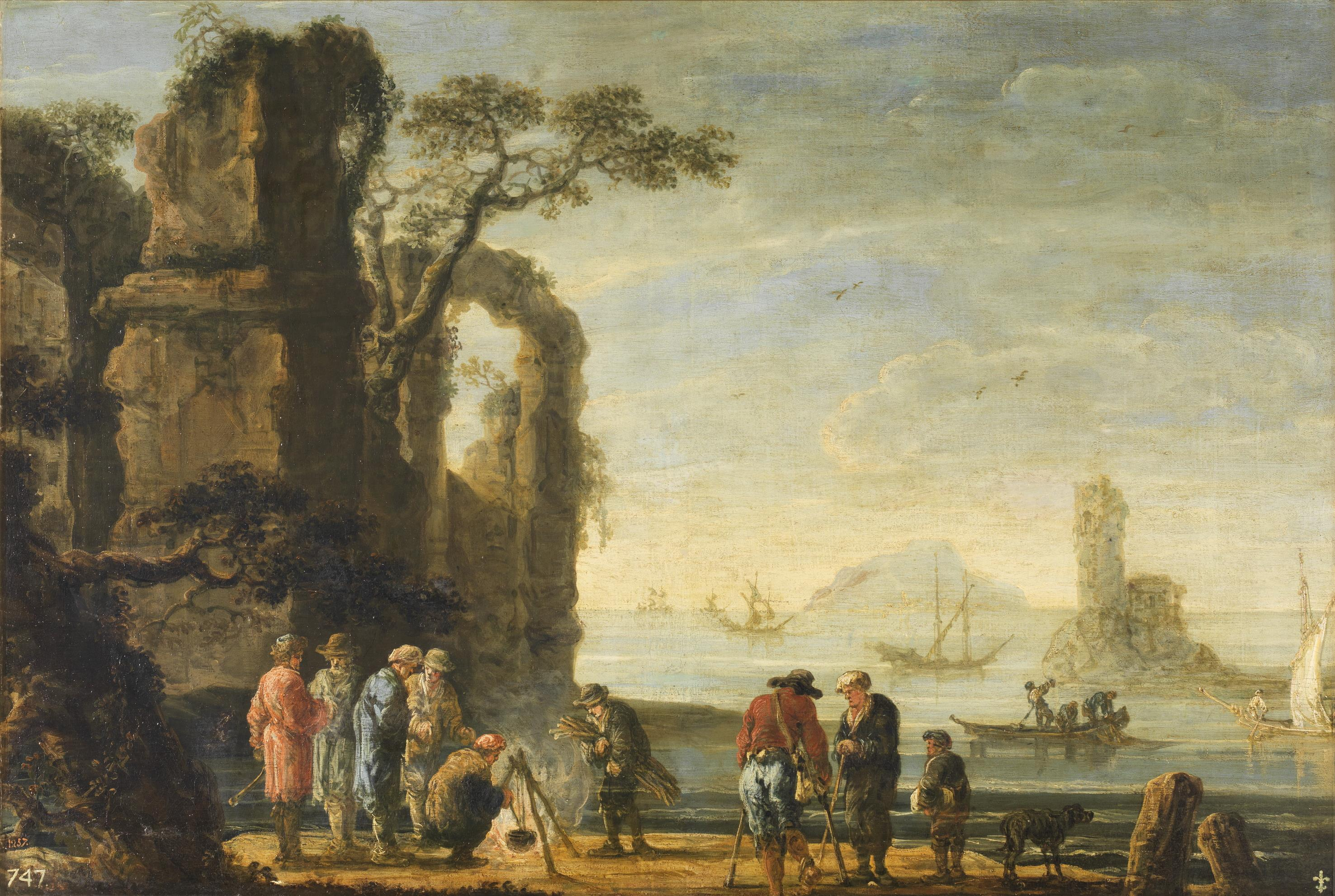
A pier

Few details about the life of Jan de Momper are known with certainty. According to Italian sources he was born in Antwerp. This would indicate that he may have been a member of the extensive family de Momper, which specialised in landscape painting. The de Momper family was a prominent family of landscape painters and printmakers, originally from Bruges, which had settled in Antwerp in the 16th century. Some art historian have suggested that he was the Joannes de Momper who was born on 16 August 1614 as the son of the painter Jan de Momper (II) and Elizabeth van Hoeswinckel. Jan de Momper (II) was a brother of the prominent landscape painter Joos de Momper. He is identified by some art historians with the Joannes de Momper who was registered as an embroiderer in 1635 at the Antwerp Guild of Saint Luke as a 'wijnmeester', i.e. the son of a member. Jan likely left Antwerp in the late 1630s when the family de Momper's large studio collapsed after the death of Joos de Momper, the leading artist in the family.

In the year 1657 the artist was recorded in Rome in connection with a commission to produce 9 landscapes for the prominent Roman Doria Pamphilj family. Some of his works are still present in the Doria Pamphilj Gallery in Rome where the family's large art collection is currently housed. In 1661 he was a well-established painter in Rome, as evidenced by a very important order from another distinguished art loving family in Rome, the Chigi family. He had very likely already been working in Rome well before the first records of his presence in the city.

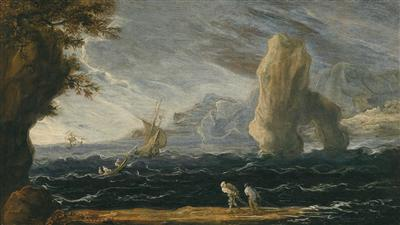
Fishermen on the coast

Jan de Momper is believed to have joined the Bentvueghels, an organization of mainly Flemish and Dutch painters active in Rome. It was the custom of the Bentvueghels to adopt a nickname, the so-called bent name, at the time a member was admitted. The bent name of Jan de Momper was 'Eervrucht' ('Fruit of Honour').

Jan de Momper was linked with the prominent Flemish battle painter Vincent Adriaenssen who was active in Rome. Jan's wife Agnes Vincentii, who died in Rome on 19 April 1684, was Adriaenssen's daughter. Adriaenssen was also his early mentor in Rome.

In 1684 Jan de Momper was recorded as working on the palace of the Chigi family in Ariccia. There is no further sign of life of Jan de Momper after the report on the death of his wife in 1684.

== Work ==
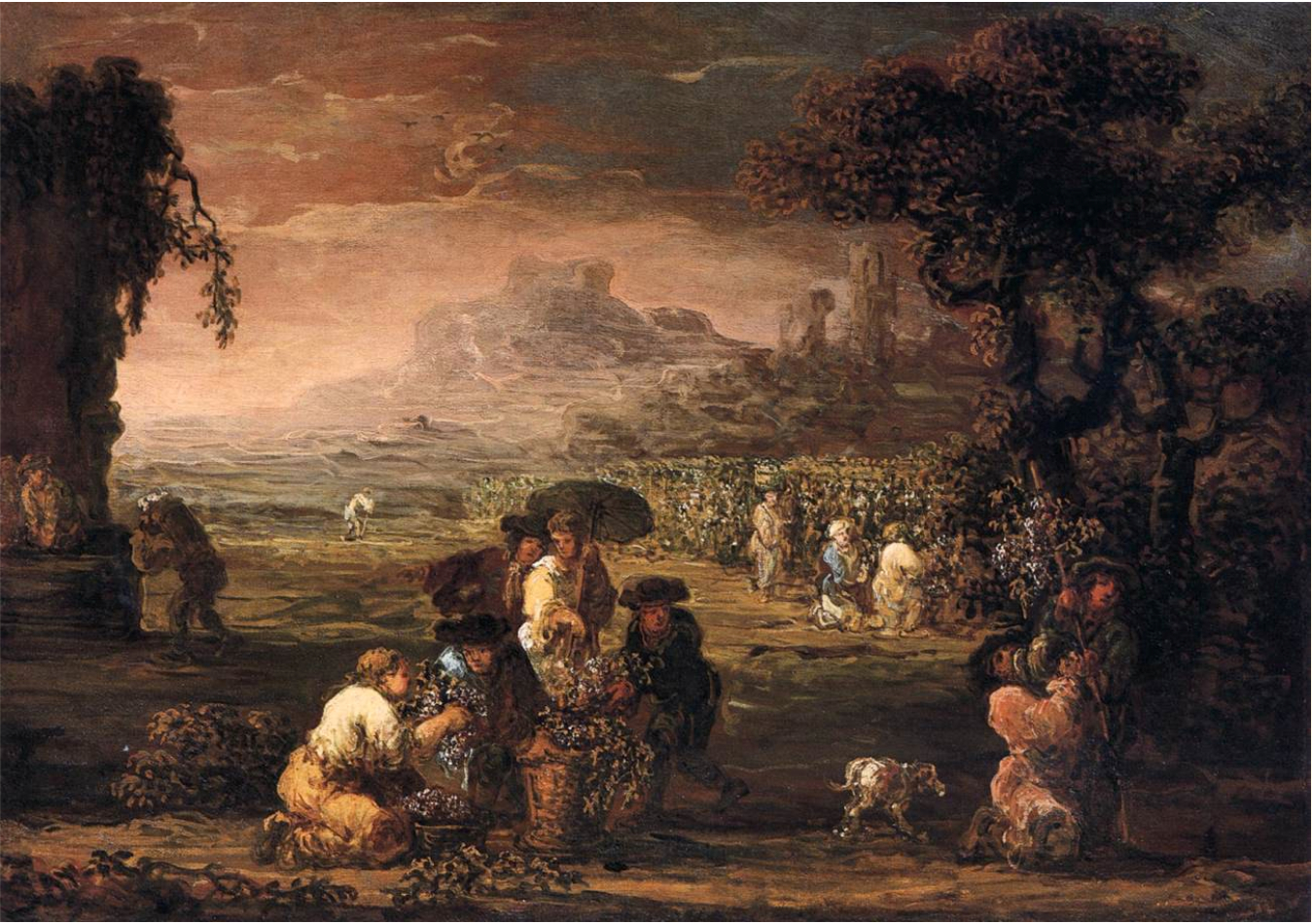
Grape harvest

Jan de Momper's name as a painter was virtually lost until the art historian Roberto Longhi brought together a series of landscapes characterized by a strong personality and a remarkable freedom of brush under the notname "Monsù X". From an inscription on the back of one of those canvases, owned by the Chigi family, Longhi was able to identify the anonymous master as Jan de Momper.

Jan de Momper is known for his landscapes depicting coastal and river landscapes populated with contemporary figures and hunting scenes. The landscapes of Jan de Momper are characterized by their singular extravagance. The works are very personal and executed with a great freedom of the brush and with strong contrasts. His compositions reveal a preference for the unfinished. His style demonstrates he was familiar with the landscapes of Rembrandt as will as the late works of Salvator Rosa. The freedom of his brushwork explains why some of his works have in the past been attributed to Goya or a follower of Goya and Alessandro Magnasco. Some of his views also call to mind Claude Lorrain's landscapes. The expressionistic talent of Jan de Momper made him a unique case in the artistic panorama of Baroque Rome.

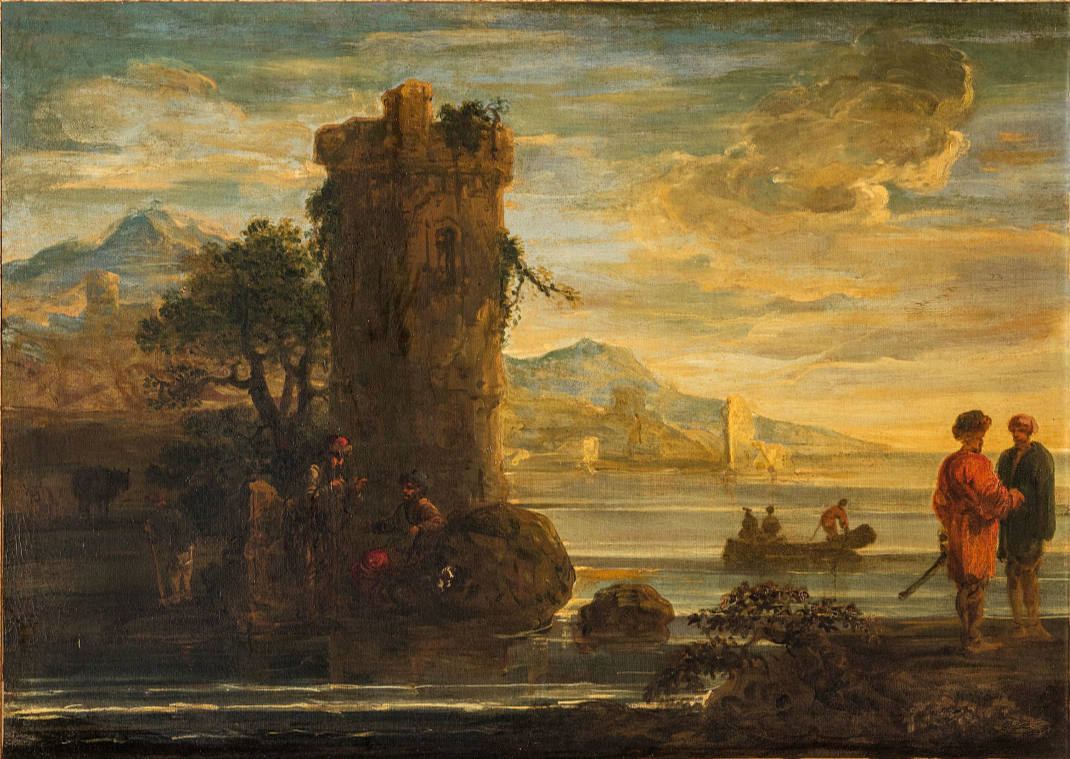
Coastal landscape with tower

Three of his landscapes are preserved in the Prado, to which they were transferred from the royal collection. The works were inventoried as de Momper but without indicating his first name, which had led to an attribution of the works to the more famous Joos de Momper. Another landscape attributed to the artist is the Grape Harvest in the Academy of Fine Arts Vienna. This work was originally attributed to an anonymous follower of Goya before it was reattributed to Jan de Momper.
