= La Bataille de Caresme et de Charnage =

13th-century French fabliau

La Bataille de Caresme et Charnage
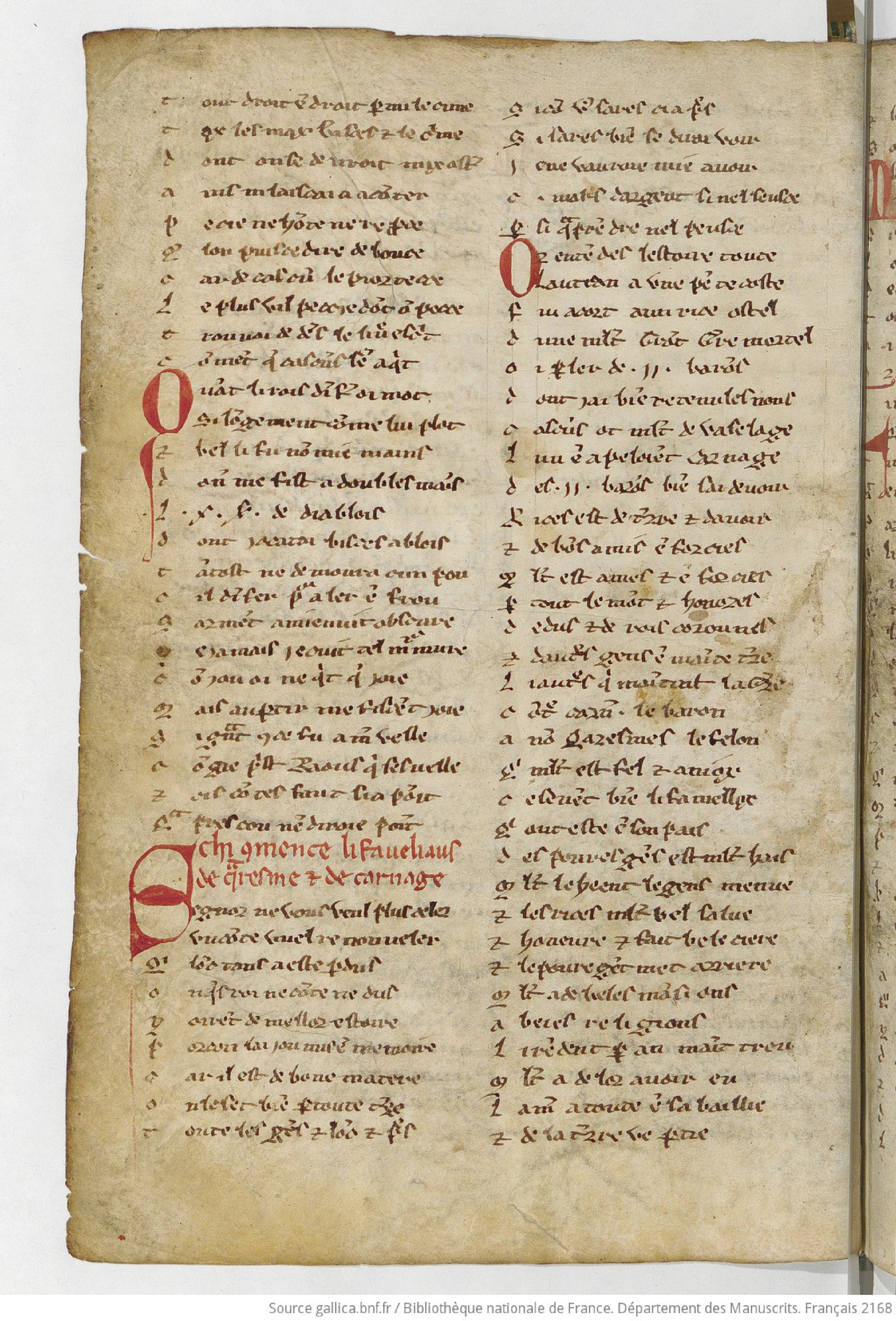
- Author(s): Unknown
- Language: Old French
- Date: 1250-1300
- Provenance: Picardy, Champagne

La Bataille de Caresme et de Charnage ("The Fight Between Carnival and Lent") is an anonymous fabliau, considered to be one of the oldest texts in French gastronomic literature. It is written in octosyllabic verse with rhymed pairs and survives in multiple manuscripts compiling fabliaux. However, according to historian Armando Bisanti, La Bataille de Caresme et de Charnage is not a simple comic fabliau, but a sophisticated parody of the chanson de geste genre.

It is believed to have been written during the second half of the 13th century, probably in Picardy or Champagne.

The poem tells the story of the opposition between Caresme, representing Lent “the despised” and Charnage, representing Carnival, baron of fine food and feasting. On the battlefield their armies fight in their stead, but the soldiers are quite peculiar: fresh herring with white garlic, dried whale meat, pork with ginger...

The text in its longest version is 574 verses long, but slight variations exist between the five remaining manuscripts containing the poem.

== Plot ==
At the king's court, on the day Pentecost, a quarrel starts between two powerful lords: Quaresme [Caresme] and Charnage. Charnage is described as a lavish baron, wheareas Caresme is vividly hated by his peers for being "treacherous". After the quarrel, a declaration of war between the two is ensued (vv. 59–152).

Both barons gather their armies. On Caresme's side, fish are assembled, respecting the culinary restrictions of Lent. On Charnage's, the soldiers are roasts, poultries, vegetables seasoned with bacon, along with cheese and milk (vv. 153–186).

After the gathering of the armies, the lords are presented on their mounts: Caresme rides a rather bland mule, and Charnage a magnificent white stag (vv. 187–365). The battle begins with the two leaders fighting hand-to-hand (vv. 366–389). Fairly quickly, the battlefied turns into complete chaos (vv. 390–492). Despite the valor of his men, Caresme is forced to retreat (vv. 493–500). After the fight resumes, Noël [Christmas] arrives with fresh reinforcements of hams, showing Caresme that continuing the fight is pointless (vv. 501–537). He enters peace talks, and Noël, who acts as mediator, imposes perpetual exile on him, with the exception of six weeks per year (vv. 538–574).

== Literary genre ==
La Bataille de Caresme et de Charnage is a fabliau. But as mentioned previously, scholars have also argued that it the poem functions as a parody of the chanson de geste. Indeed, it seems to adopt its narrative structures and motifs: after a prologue (vv. 1–14) and an introduction (vv. 15–58) starts the canonical sections of the offense (vv. 59–88), then the quarrel (vv. 89–152), the summoning of the troops (vv. 153–186), their advance (vv. 187–276), the dubbing (vv. 277–365), the duel (vv. 366–389), the general melee (vv. 390–492) and after a retreat that allows for a pause and for the two armies to rest (vv. 493–500), the story reaches its resolution with the resumption of the fight (vv. 501–537) and the final victory of Charnage over Caresme (vv. 538–574).

However, those motifs are completely distorted into culinary nonsense. For example, in the summoning of the troops, the messenger that goes to raise an army for Caresme in a herring. The knights said herring recruits are whales, salmons, whitings... On Charnage's side, the knights are venison in pastry, beef cooked in lard and black pepper or even roasted peacocks. The heroic character of knights is completely erased and turned to ridicule.

== Legacy ==
La Bataille de Caresme et de Charnage started a cultural tradition that stages the opposition between Lent and Carnival as an actual conflict. By personifying abstinence and excess and presenting their opposition in the form of a parodic battle, the poem created an allegorical model of hunger.

The Fight Between Carnival and Lent
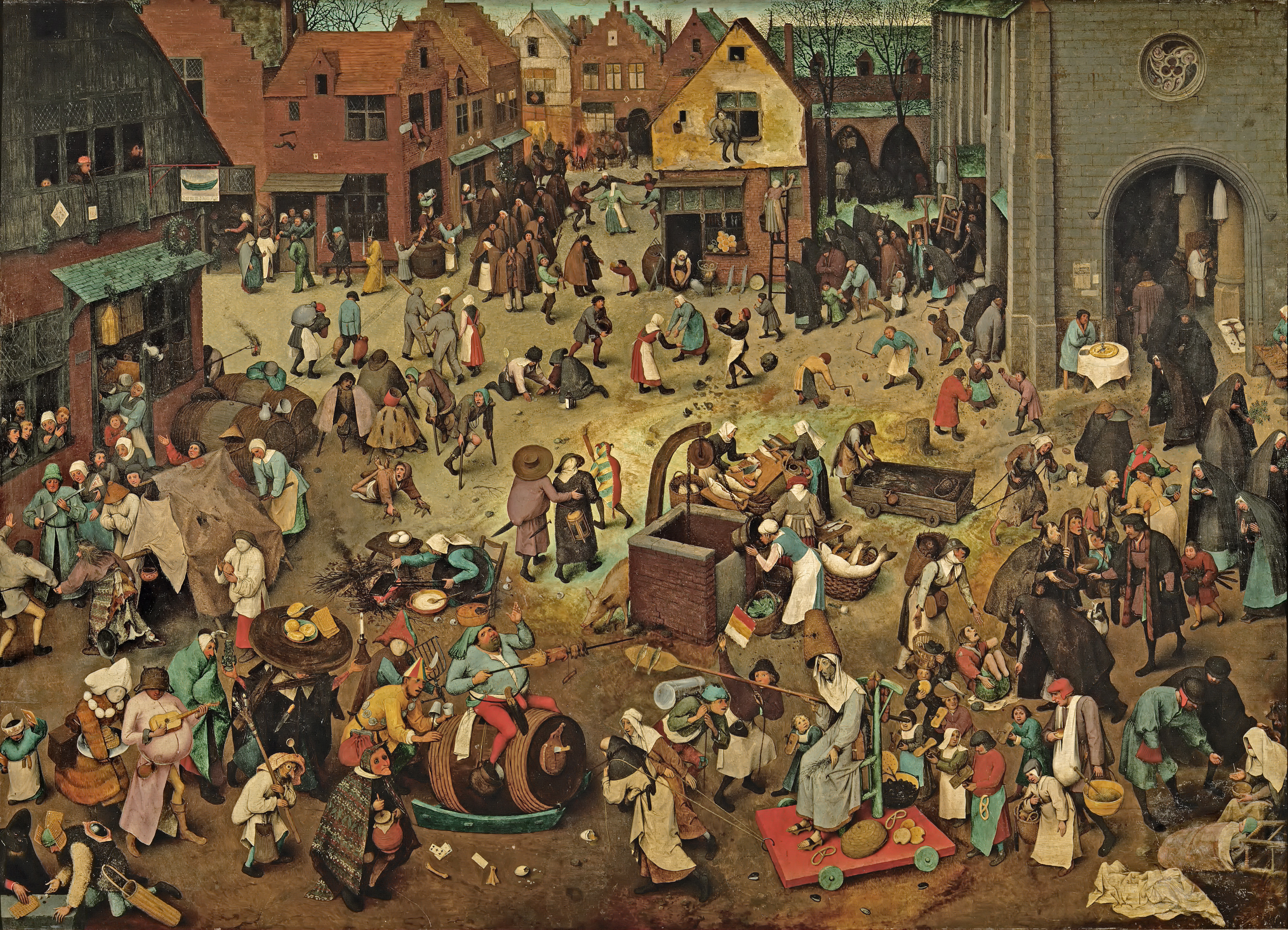
- Artist: Pieter Bruegel the Elder
- Year: 1559
- Medium: oil on panel
- Dimensions: 118 cm × 164 cm (46 in × 65 in)
- Location: Kunsthistorisches Museum, Vienna

The legacy of the allegory is especially visible in Netherlandish painting of the sixteenth century, where the struggle between Carnival and Lent becomes a recurring visual theme. Works such as Battle Between Carnival and Lent or The Fight Between Carnival and Lent depicts the conflict of La Bataille de Caresme et de Charnage.

Significant differences nonetheless separate the medieval text from its later visual legacy. In the poem, the conflict ends with a clear defeat on Caresme's part who is described as a loathed baron, in opposition to the very loved Charnage. The outcome thus reflects a preference for the abundance and festivity linked to Carnival, even though it acknowledges the non-definitive aspect of Lent's defeat, who is allowed to come back for six weeks a year by the mediator Christmas. In the paintings, however, the confrontation is often more balanced. Neither of them is clearly better than the other.

The figure of Lent is also frequently feminized and associated with ecclesiastical order, while Carnival becomes a figure of popular excess embedded within communal life.

== Manuscripts and Modern Editions ==
The poem is found in five manuscripts of the Bibliothèque Nationale de France:

- Paris, BNF fr. 837 (fol 21r - 24r)
- Paris, BNF fr. 1593 (fol 120v - 122v)
- Paris, BNF fr. 2168 (fol 84v - 88r)
- Paris, BNF fr. 19152 (fol 90v - 93r)
- Paris, BNF fr. 25545 (fol 24v - 28v)

It was transcribed and published for the first time in the early 19th century in a collections of fabliaux. This first edition has been largely reworked, as scholars were not satisfied with the transcription and the versification work of Méon.
