= Judith Leyster =

Dutch painter (1609–1660)

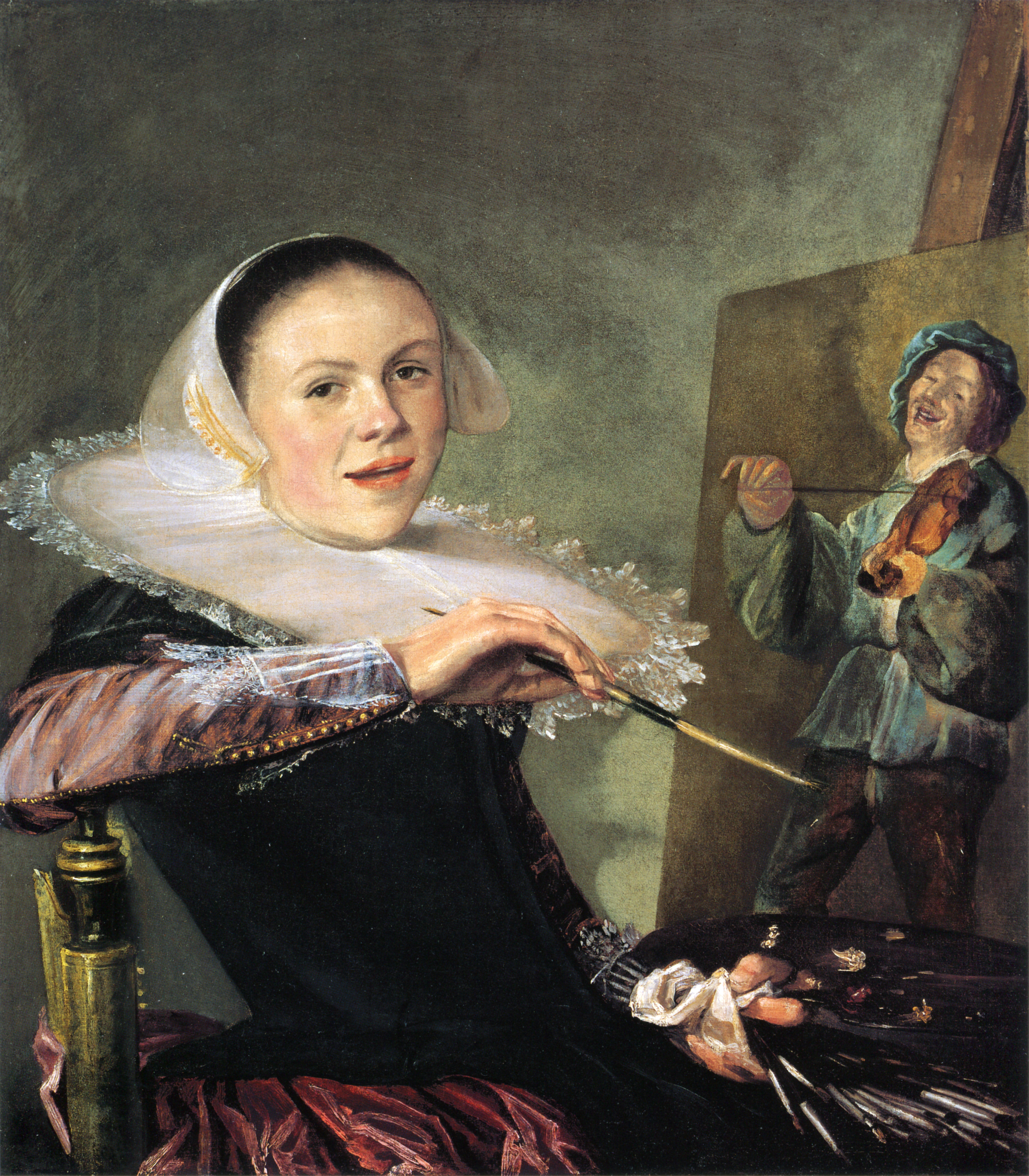
- Self-Portrait, c. 1630, National Gallery of Art Washington
- Born: Haarlem, County of Holland, Dutch Republic
- Baptised: July 28, 1609
- Died: February 10, 1660 (aged 50); Heemstede, County of Holland, Dutch Republic
- Known for: Painting
- Notable work: The Proposition, 1631
- Spouse: Jan Miense Molenaer (m. 1636)
- Children: 5

Judith Jans Leyster (also Leijster; baptised July 28, 1609 – February 10, 1660) was a Dutch Golden Age painter of genre works, portraits, and still lifes. Her work was highly regarded by her contemporaries but largely forgotten after her death. Her entire oeuvre came to be attributed to Frans Hals or to her husband, Jan Miense Molenaer. In 1893, she was rediscovered and scholars began to attribute her works correctly.

== Biography ==
Leyster was born in July 1609 in Haarlem to a local cloth maker who later became a brewer. She was the eighth child of Jan Willemsz Leyster. While the details of her training are uncertain, she was mentioned by contemporary Haarlem poet Samuel Ampzing in his book Beschrijvinge ende lof der stadt Haerlem (1628).

Some scholars speculate that Leyster pursued a career in painting to help support her family after her father's bankruptcy. She may have learned painting from Frans Pietersz de Grebber, who was running a respected workshop in Haarlem in the 1620s. During this time her family moved to the province of Utrecht, and she may have come into contact with some of the Utrecht Caravaggisti.

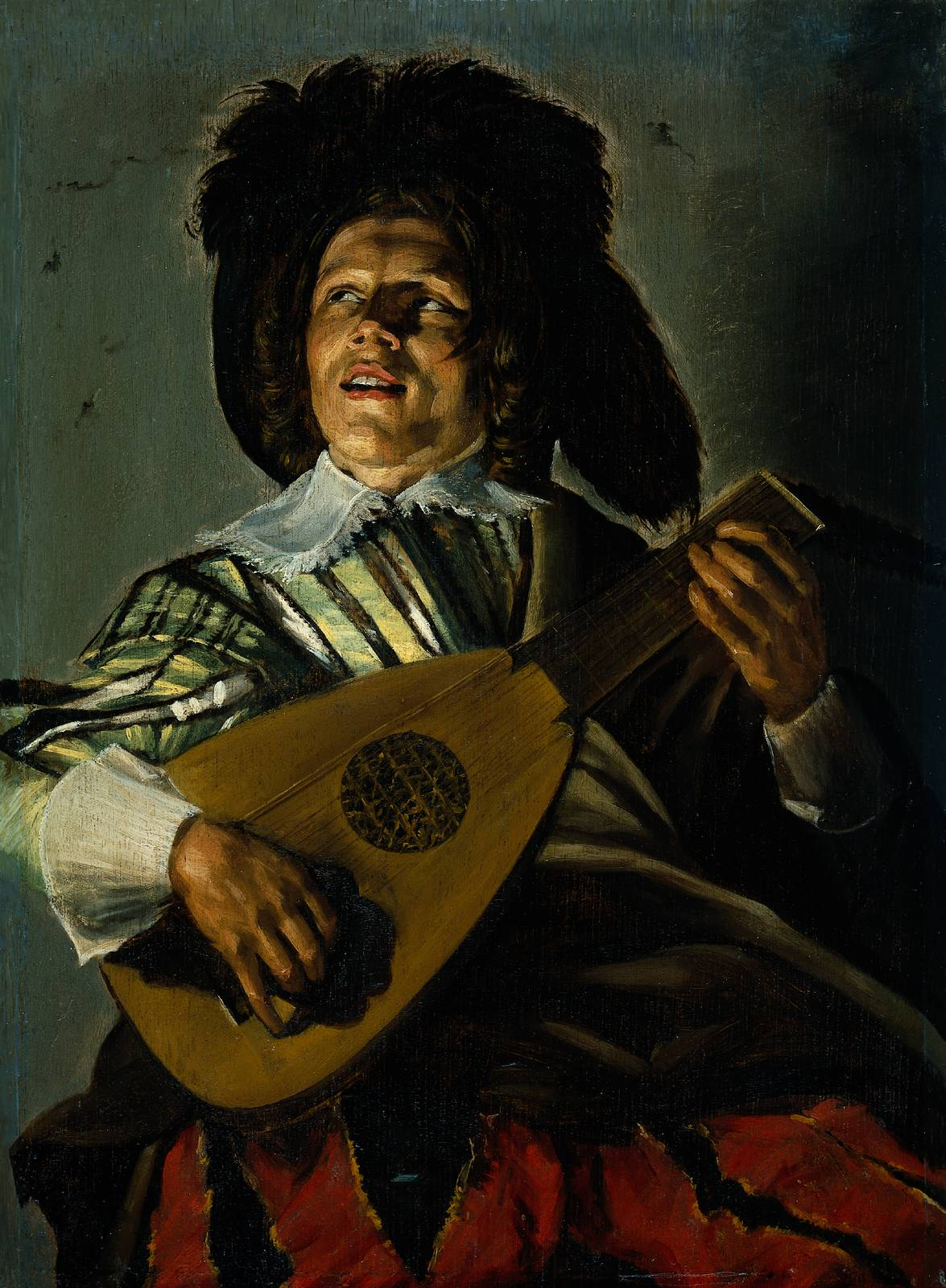
Serenade by Leyster, 1629 (Rijksmuseum)

Leyster's first known signed works, Serenade and Jolly Toper, are dated 1629, when the artist was twenty years old. By 1633, she was admitted as a member of the Haarlem Guild of St. Luke. Some sources say she was the first woman registered by the Guild; others say it was Sara van Baalbergen in 1631. Dozens of other female artists may have been admitted to the Guild of St. Luke during the 17th century; however, since the medium in which they worked was often not listed, so it is difficult to determine how many were painters. At the time, artists working in embroidery, pottery painting, metal and wood were included in guilds, and some were included for continuing the work of their deceased husbands.

It has been suggested that Leyster's Self-Portrait, c. 1633 (National Gallery of Art, Washington, D.C.), may have been her presentation piece to the Guild. This work marks a shift from the rigidity of earlier women's self-portraits toward a more relaxed, dynamic pose. It is very relaxed by the standards of other Dutch portraits. Leyster depicts herself dressed elegantly, with a formal dark dress, and an elaborate lace collar. However, it seems unlikely that she wore such formal clothes when painting in oils, especially the very wide lace collar. The formality of her costume was nothing new, as there was an interest in raising the social status of artists at the time. It was common for portrait artists to dress themselves in clothing and ornaments of rank and intellect. Leyster was showcasing her wealth and intellect as well as her expertise as a genre painter, as we see a fully finished work of a fiddler on the easel in front of her.

Within two years of entering the Guild, Leyster had taken on three male apprentices. Records show that Leyster sued Frans Hals for accepting a student who left her workshop for his without first obtaining the Guild's permission. The student's mother paid Leyster four guilders in punitive damages, only half of what Leyster asked for, and Hals settled his part of the lawsuit by paying a three-guilder fine rather than returning the apprentice. Leyster herself was fined for not having registered the apprentice with the Guild. Following her lawsuit with Frans Hals, Leyster's paintings received greater recognition.

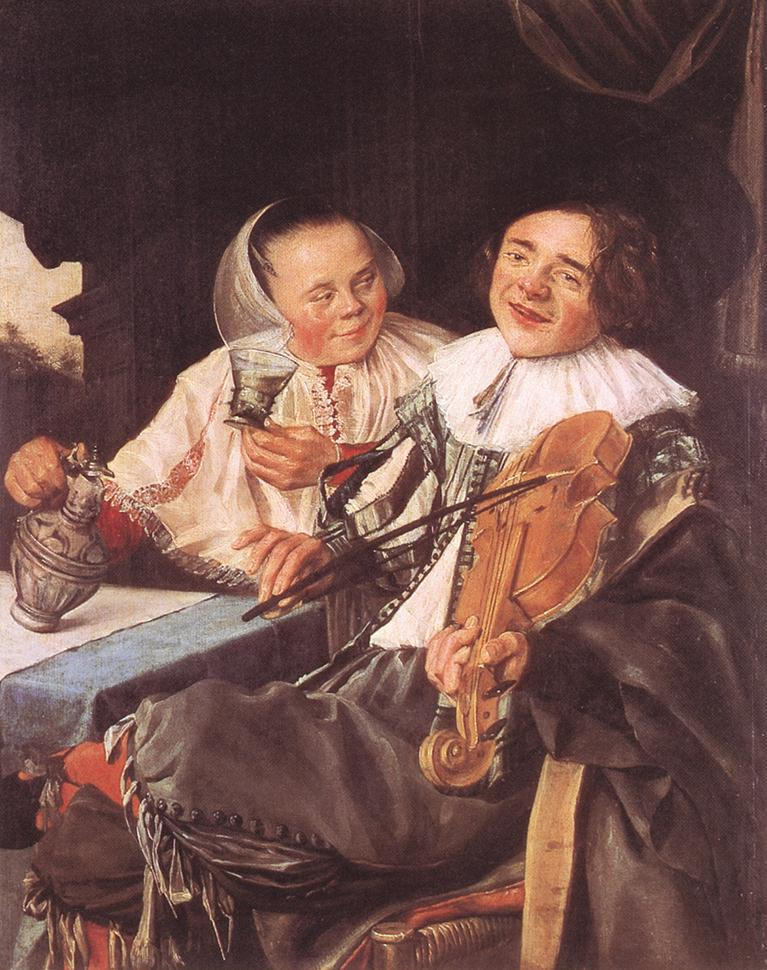
The Happy Couple by Leyster, 1630 (Louvre)

In 1636, Leyster married the prolific artist Jan Miense Molenaer. They both worked on similar subjects like portraits and history paintings. In hopes of better economic prospects, the couple moved to Amsterdam where Molenaer already had clients. They remained there for eleven years before returning to Heemstede in the Haarlem area. There they shared a studio in a small house located in the present-day Groenendaal Park. Leyster and Molenaer had five children, only two of whom survived to adulthood.

Most of Leyster's dated works were produced before her marriage and are dated between 1629 and 1635. There are few known pieces by her painted after 1635: two illustrations in a book about tulips from 1643, a portrait from 1652, and a still life from 1654 that was discovered in a private collection in the 21st century. Leyster may have worked collaboratively with her husband as well. She died in 1660, aged 50. She was buried at a farm just outside of Haarlem. None of her artwork was publicly displayed or attributed to her for close to 200 years. The fact that the inventory of her estate attributed many of the paintings to "the wife of Molenaer", not to Judith Leyster, may have contributed to the misattribution of her work to her husband.

== Works ==
Leyster signed her works with a monogram of her initials JL with a star attached. This was a play on words: "Leister" meant "Lead star" in Dutch, and for Dutch mariners of the time it was the common name for the North Star. The Leistar was the name of her father's brewery in Haarlem, which he bought in 1618. Leyster used Ley-Ster as her pseudonym. She studied in the studio of Frans Peter de Grebber, who was a well-known painter in Haarlem. She became associated with Frans Hals once deciding to pursue a more independent artistic career. It has been documented that Leyster admired Hals. Toward 1629, Leyster became professionally independent, as indicated by the change in how she signed her paintings. She now signed them with her own monogram, which is evident in her painting The Merry Drunkard, also known as The Jolly Toper.

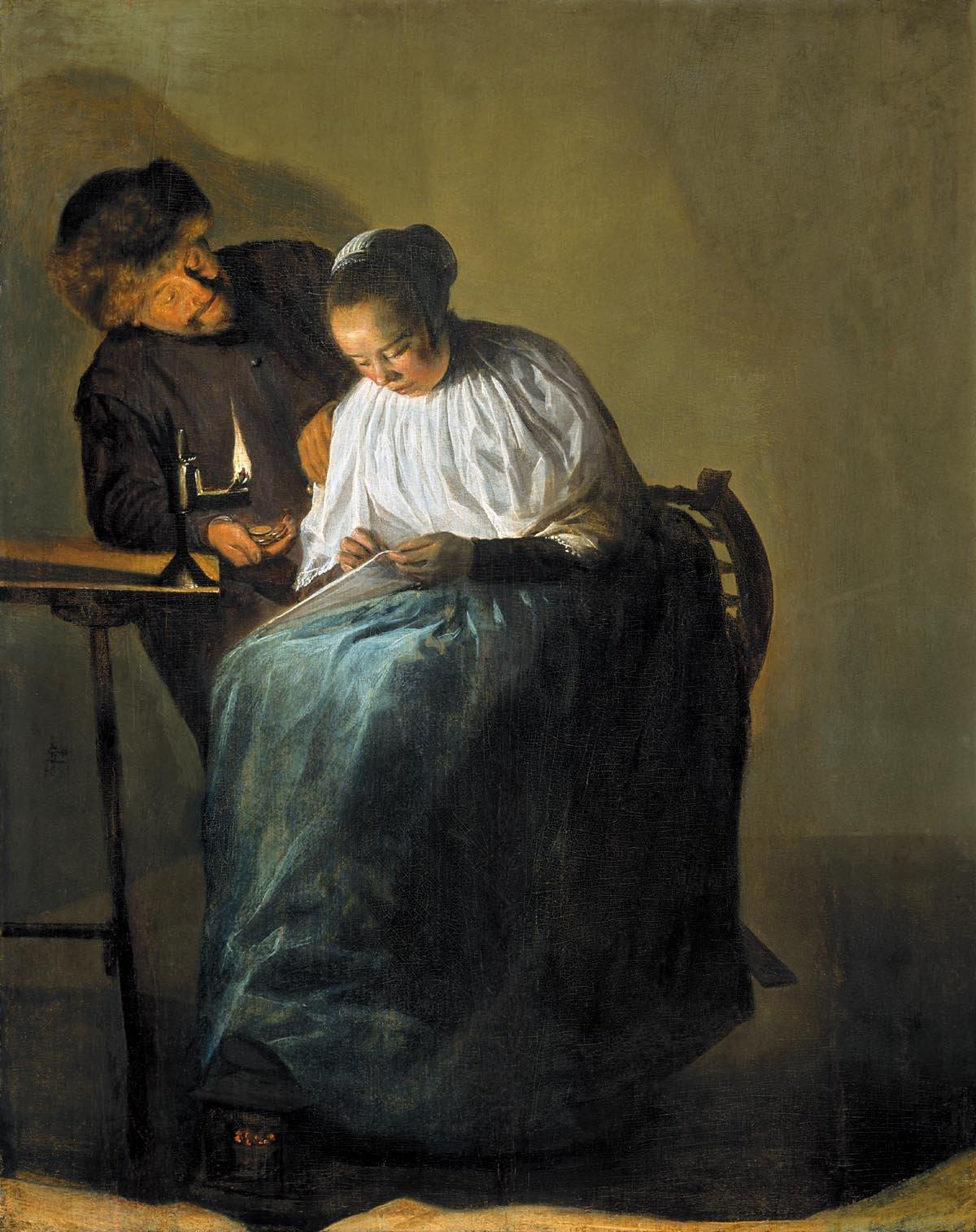
The Proposition by Judith Leyster

She specialized in portrait-like genre scenes, typically of one to three figures, who generally exude good cheer and are shown against a plain background. Many are children, and others are men drinking. Leyster was particularly innovative in her domestic genre scenes. These are quiet scenes of women at home, often with candle- or lamplight, particularly from a woman's point of view. The Proposition (Mauritshuis, The Hague) is an unusual variant on these scenes, said by some to show a girl receiving unwelcome advances, instead of depicting a willing prostitute, the more common scene under such a title. The fact that the female subject is sewing in the scene may also have double meanings as the Dutch word for sewing (naaien) is sometimes used as a metaphor for sex. However, this interpretation is not universally accepted. Ann Sutherland Harris has interpreted the painting to be of a woman receiving an honest marriage proposal. Leyster's painting Proposition is different from other paintings that depict sex work, as she is not wearing something low-cut or getting money for a transaction. Instead, the painting depicts a quiet sense of intimacy, leading art historians such as Hofrichter to speculate that Leyster was resisting common stereotypes about women and sex. She chose to depict a virtuous woman rather than a woman stealing from a man. In The Proposition, the light does much of the storytelling. Leyster paints a man looming behind the woman, offering her coins, while defined shadows create shapes and contrast between the light red glow of the foot warmer. Leyster creates light that, although it is not the most realistic, is placed there intentionally to showcase the deep focus that will not break as the man tries to distract her from her sewing.

Much of her other work, especially of music-makers, was similar in nature to that of many of her contemporaries, such as her husband Molenaer, the brothers Frans and Dirck Hals, Jan Steen, and the Utrecht Caravaggisti Hendrick Terbrugghen and Gerrit van Honthorst. Their genre paintings, generally of taverns and other scenes of entertainment, catered to the tastes and interests of a growing segment of the Dutch middle class. She painted few actual portraits, and her only known history painting is David with the Head of Goliath (1633), which does not depart from her typical portrait style, with a single figure close to the front of the picture space.

In 1648, Theodore Schrevel, a Dutch commenter, observed: "There also have been many experienced women in the field of painting who are still renowned in our time, and who could compete with men. Among them, one excels exceptionally, Judith Leyster, called 'the true Leading star in art.'"

== Leyster and Frans Hals ==
Although well-known during her lifetime and esteemed by her contemporaries, Leyster and her work were largely forgotten after her death. She was rediscovered in 1893, when a painting admired for over a century as a work of Frans Hals was recognized as hers. After her rediscovery, she was posthumously critiqued to draw distinctions between her and Frans Hals, despite her work being mistaken for his for 200 years. In 1964, Whitney Chadwick quotes James Laver in her survey Women, Art, and Society as saying "Some women artists tend to emulate Frans Hals, but the vigorous brushstrokes of the master were beyond their capability. One has only to look at the work of a painter like Judith Leyster to detect the weakness of the feminine hand."

The confusion – or perhaps deceit – may date to Leyster's lifetime. Sir Luke Schaud acquired a Leyster, The Jolly Companions, as a Hals in the 1600s. The work ended up with a dealer, Wertheimer of Bond Street, London, who described it as one of the finest Hals paintings. Sir John Millars agreed with the Wertheimer about the authenticity and value of the painting. Wertheimer sold the painting to an English firm for £4,500. This firm, in turn, sold the painting as a Hals to Thomas Lawrie in Paris.

In 1893 the Louvre found Leyster's monogram under the fabricated signature of Hals. It is not clear when the false signature had been added. When the original signature was discovered, Thomas Lawrie sued the English firm, who in turn attempted to rescind their own purchase and get their money back from the art dealer, Wertheimer. The case was settled in court on May 31, 1893, with the plaintiffs (the unnamed English firm) agreeing to keep the painting for £3,500 + £500 costs. During the legal proceedings, there was no consideration for the work as an object of value under its new history: "at no time did anyone throw his cap in the air and rejoice that another painter, capable of equalling Hals at his best, had been discovered". Another version of The Jolly Companions had been sold in Brussels in 1890 and bore Leyster's monogram "crudely altered to an interlocking FH."

In 1893 Cornelis Hofstede de Groot wrote the first article on Leyster. He attributed seven paintings to her, six of which are signed with her distinctive monogram 'JL*'. Art historians since then have often dismissed her as an imitator or follower of Hals, although this attitude changed somewhat in the late 20th century.

Apart from the lawsuit mentioned above, the nature of Leyster's professional relationship with Frans Hals is unclear; she may have been his student or else a friendly colleague. She may have been a witness at the baptism of Hals' daughter Maria in the early 1630s, since a "Judith Jansder" (meaning "daughter of Jan") was recorded as a witness, but there were other Judith Jansders in Haarlem. Some historians have asserted that Hals or his brother Dirck may have been Leyster's teacher, owing to the close similarities between their works.

== Public collections ==
Museums holding works by Judith Leyster include the Rijksmuseum Amsterdam; the Mauritshuis, The Hague; the Frans Hals Museum, Haarlem; the Louvre, Paris; the National Gallery, London; the Philadelphia Museum of Art; and the National Gallery of Art, Washington DC. In 2022, the Currier Museum of Art purchased a Leyster painting to go with its painting by Jan Miense Molenaer

In March 2021 Leyster's work was added to the "Gallery of Honor" at the Rijksmuseum. Leyster, Gesina ter Borch, and Rachel Ruysch are the first women to be included in the gallery.

On December 19, 2022, Google featured her in a Google Doodle in the Netherlands, Iceland, Ireland, the United Kingdom, Singapore and the United States.

== Gallery ==
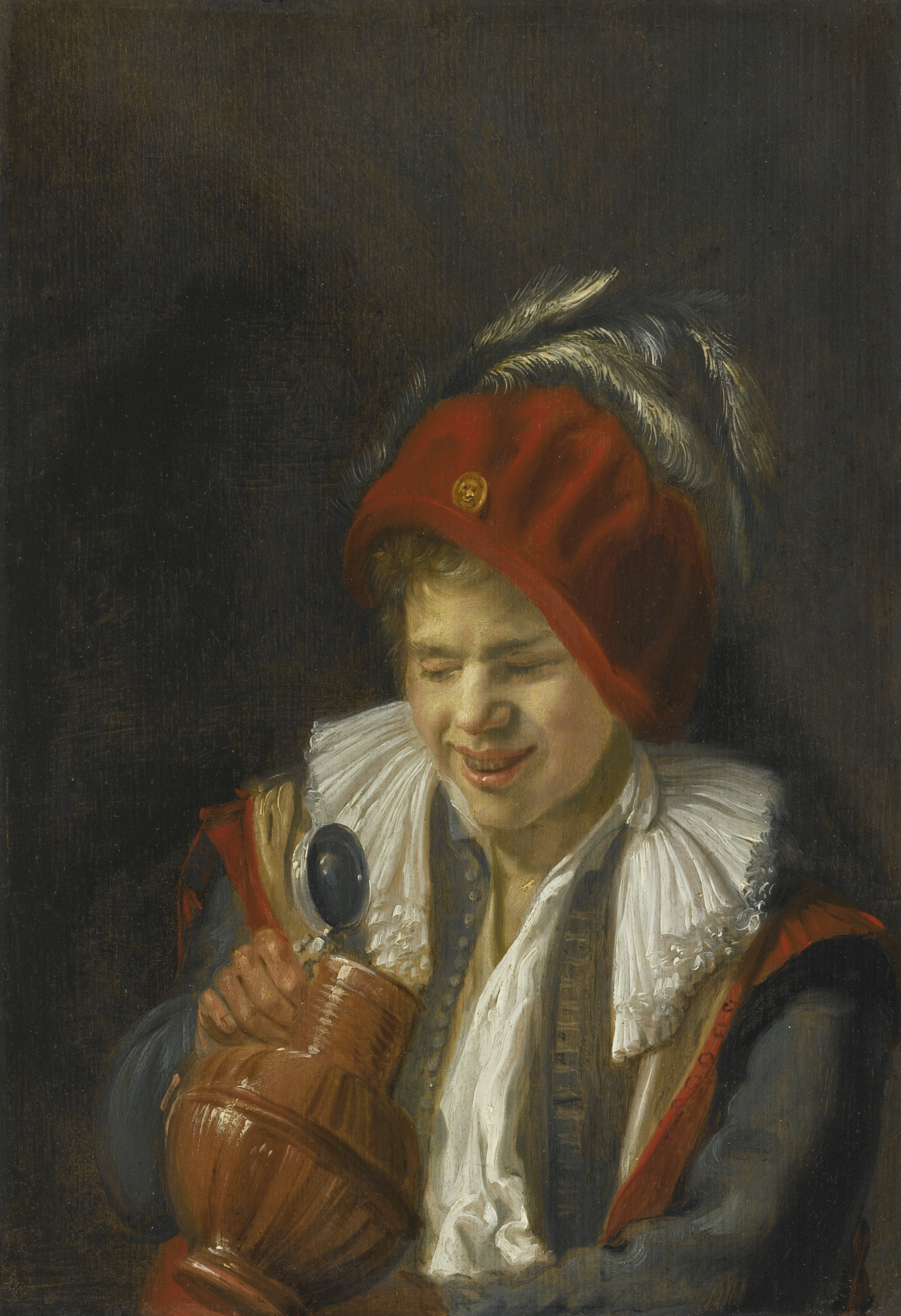
Kannekijker
(A Youth with a Jug) (1633)

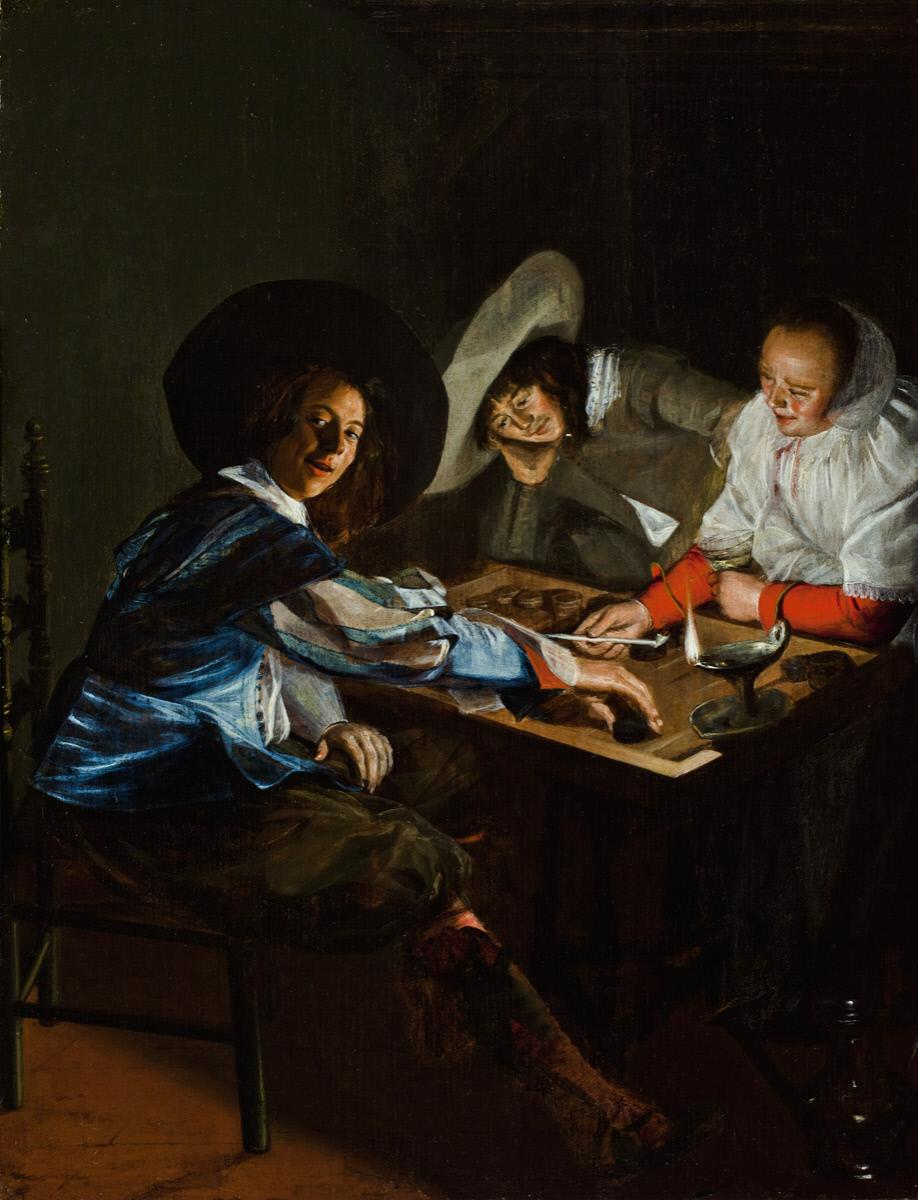
A Game of Tric Trac

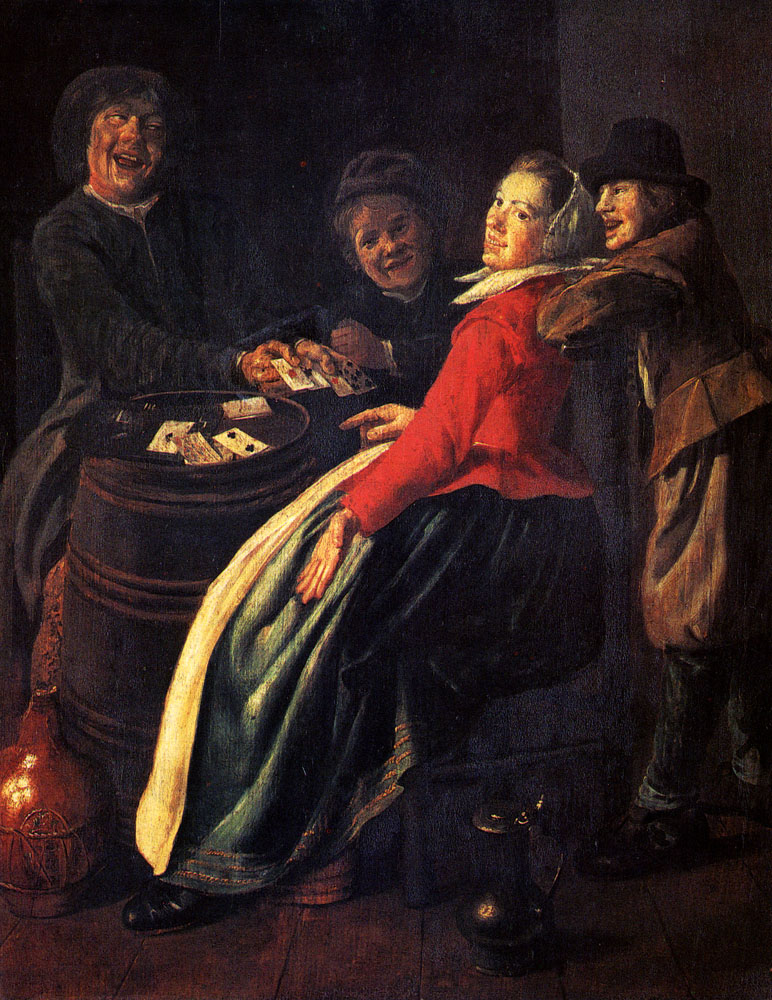
A Game Of Cards

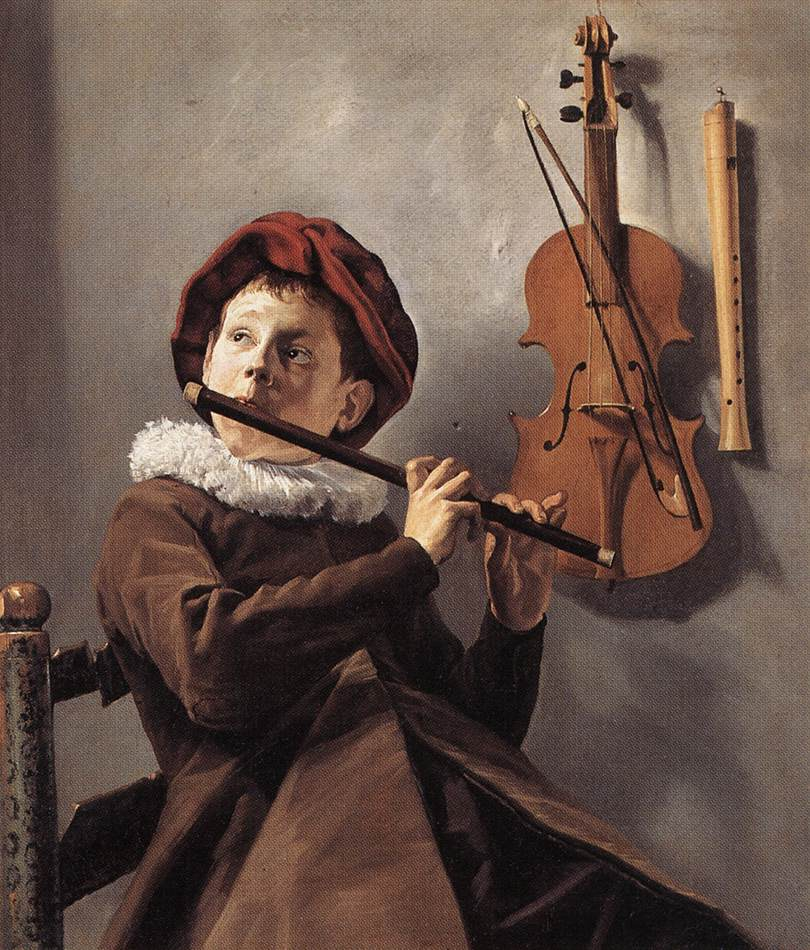
Young Flute Player

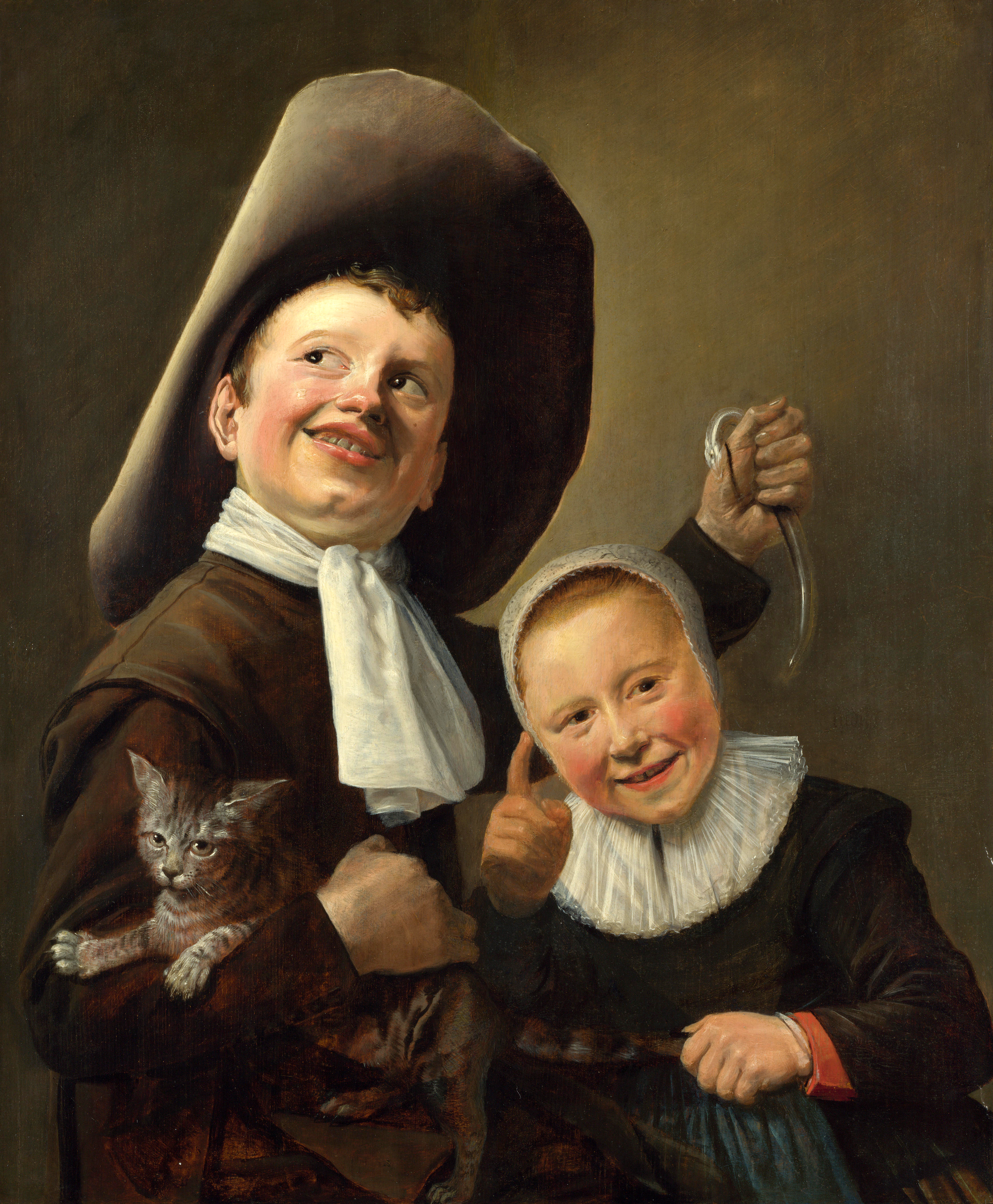
A Boy and a Girl with a Cat and an Eel

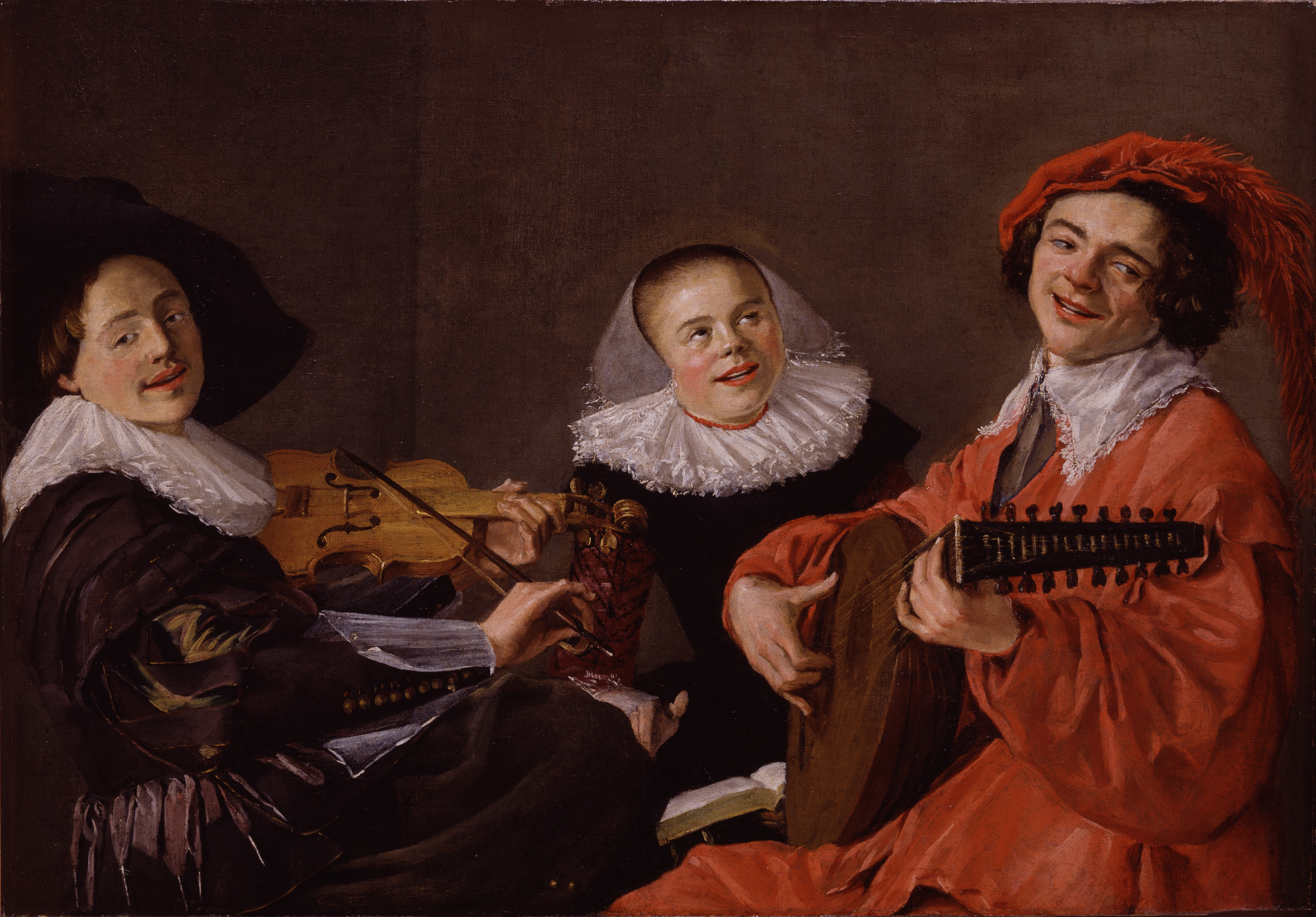
The Concert (1631–33)

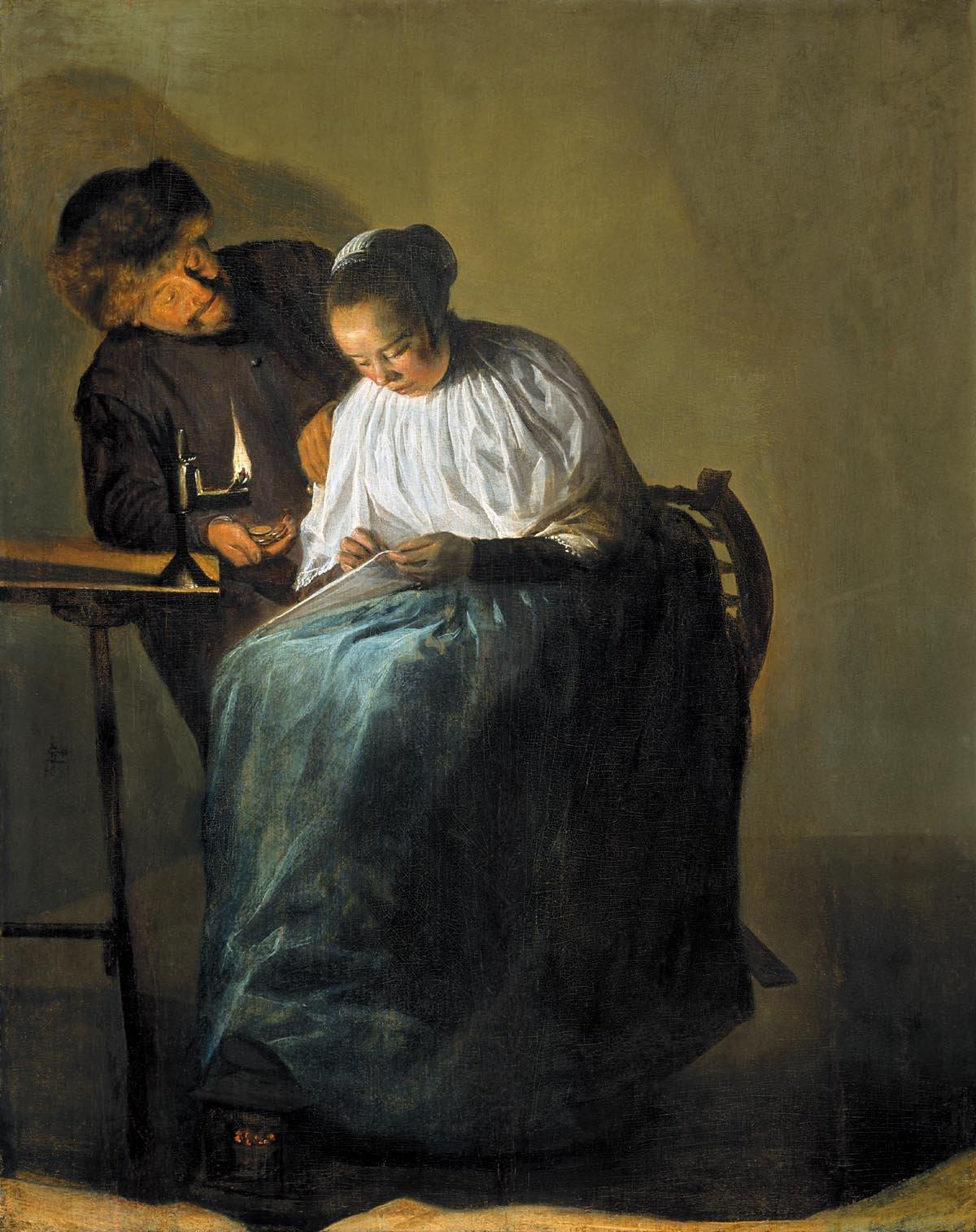
The Proposition (1631)

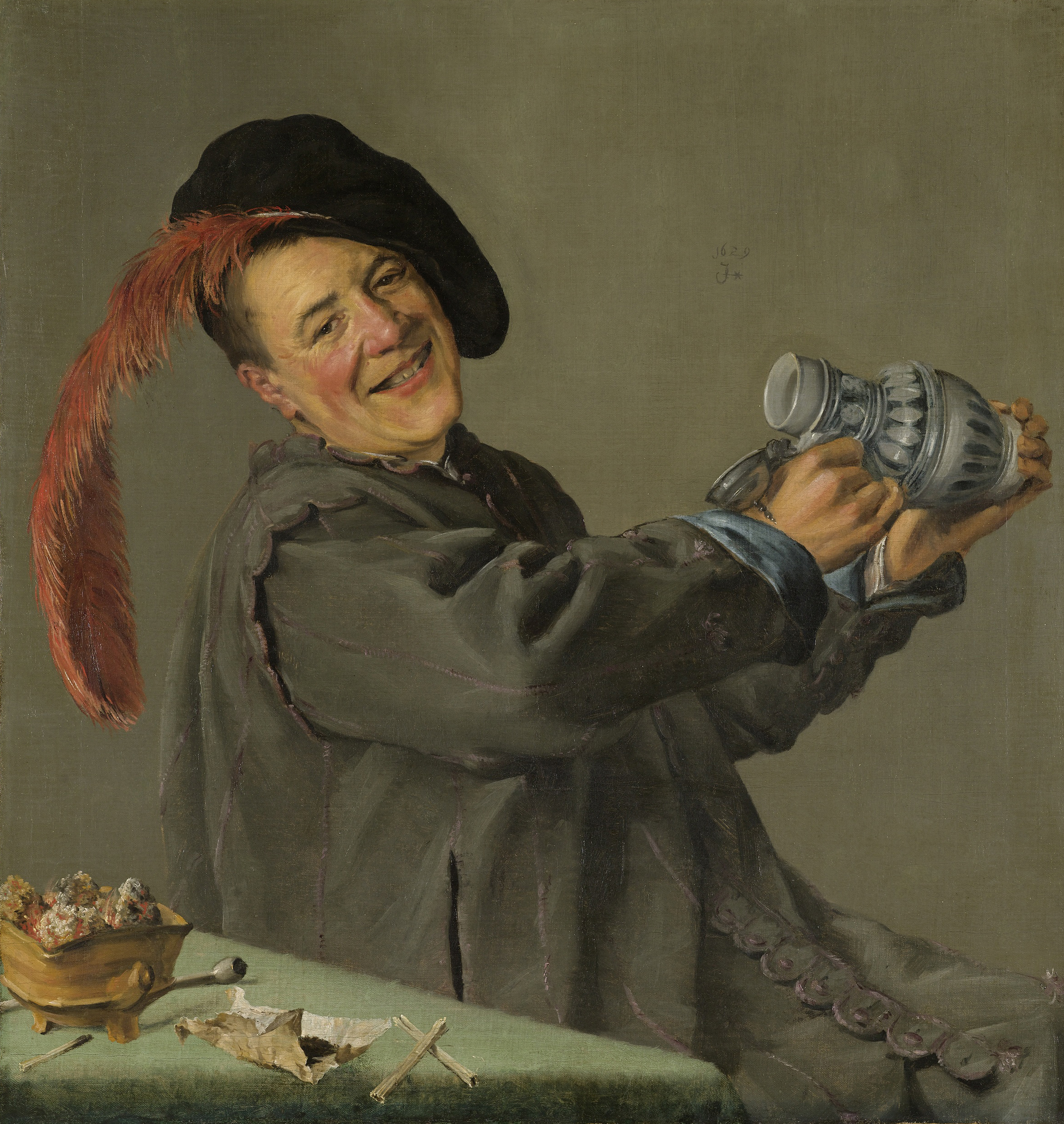
Jolly Toper (1629)

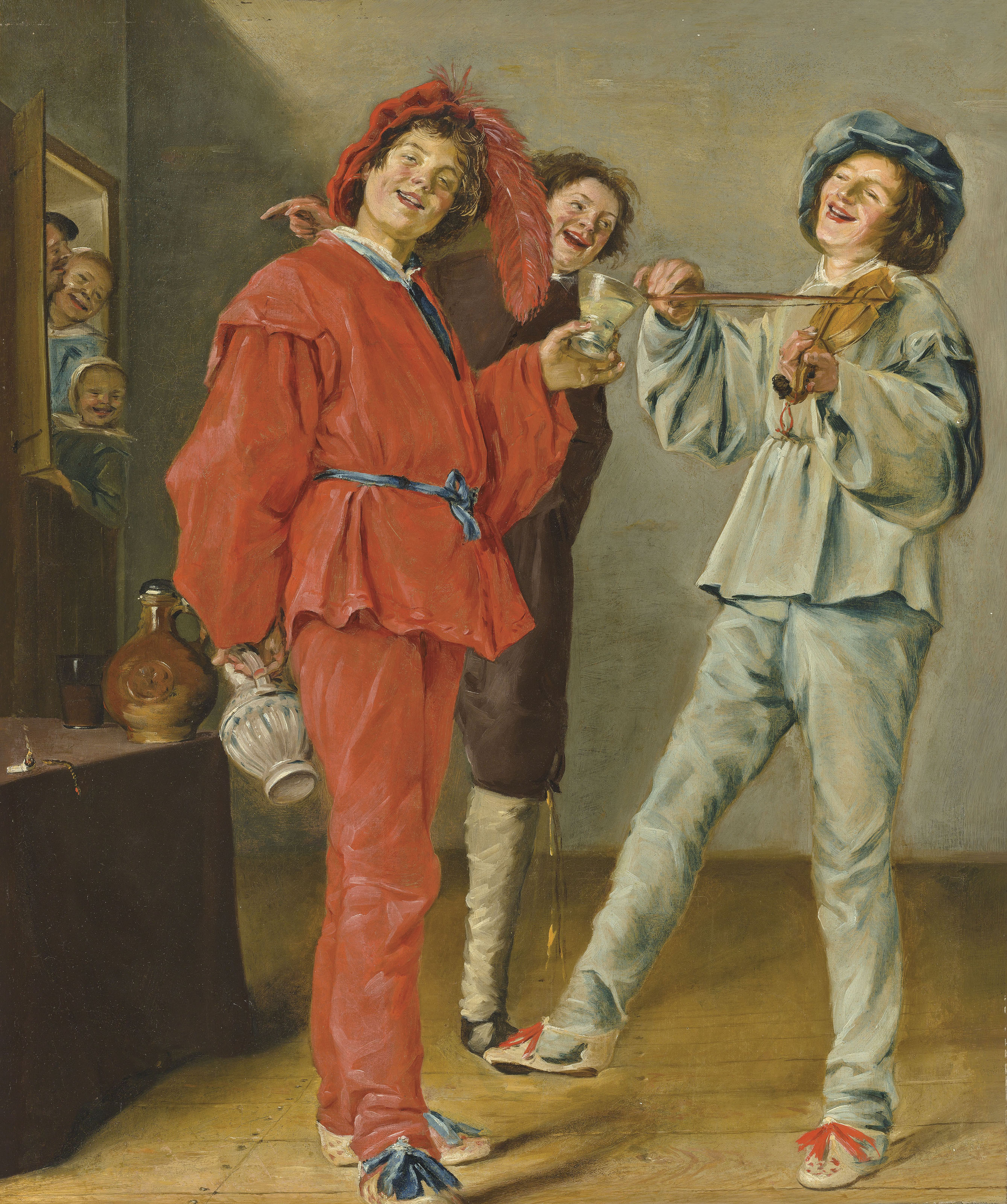
Merry Trio
(between 1629 and 1631)

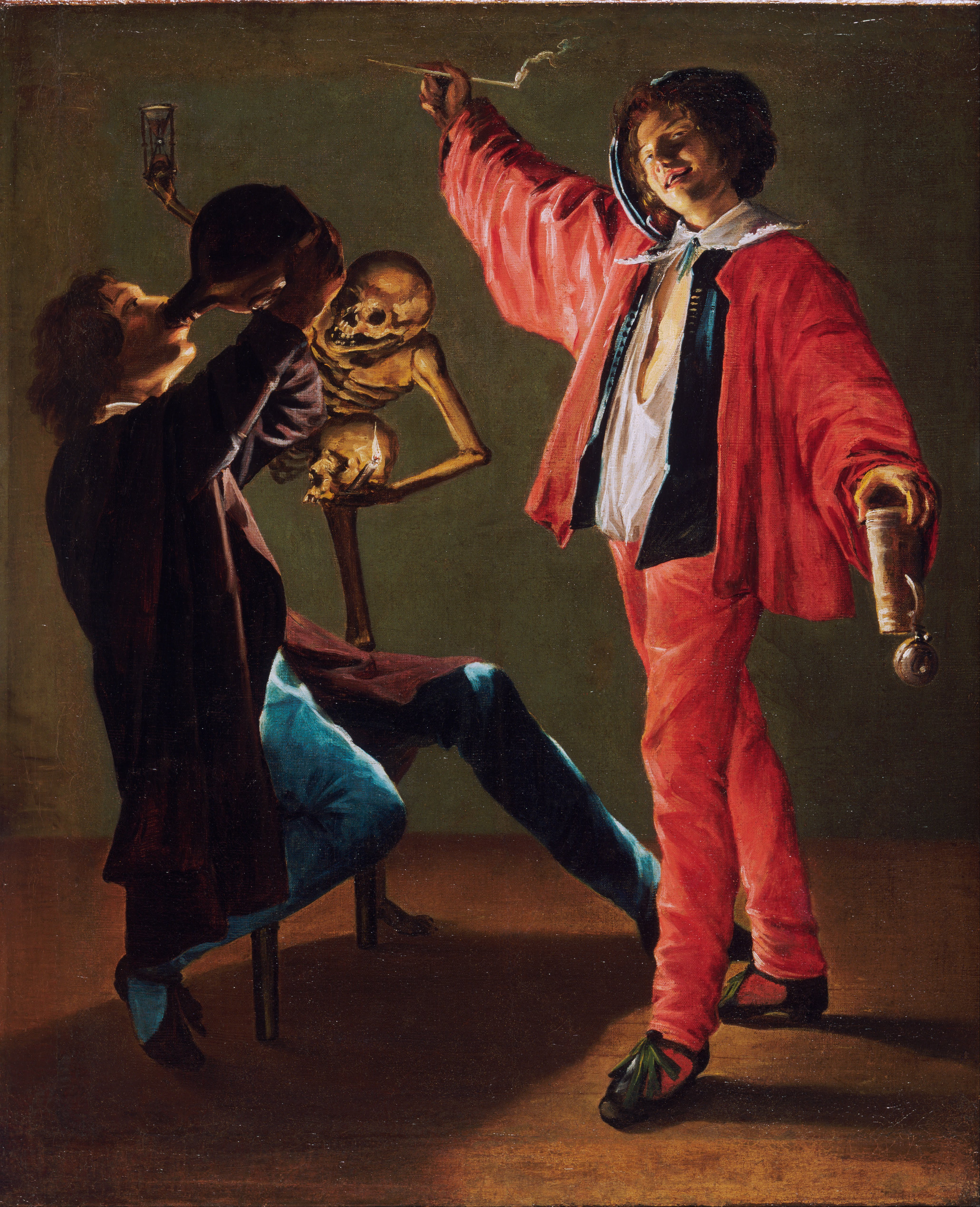
The Last Drop (c. 1629)

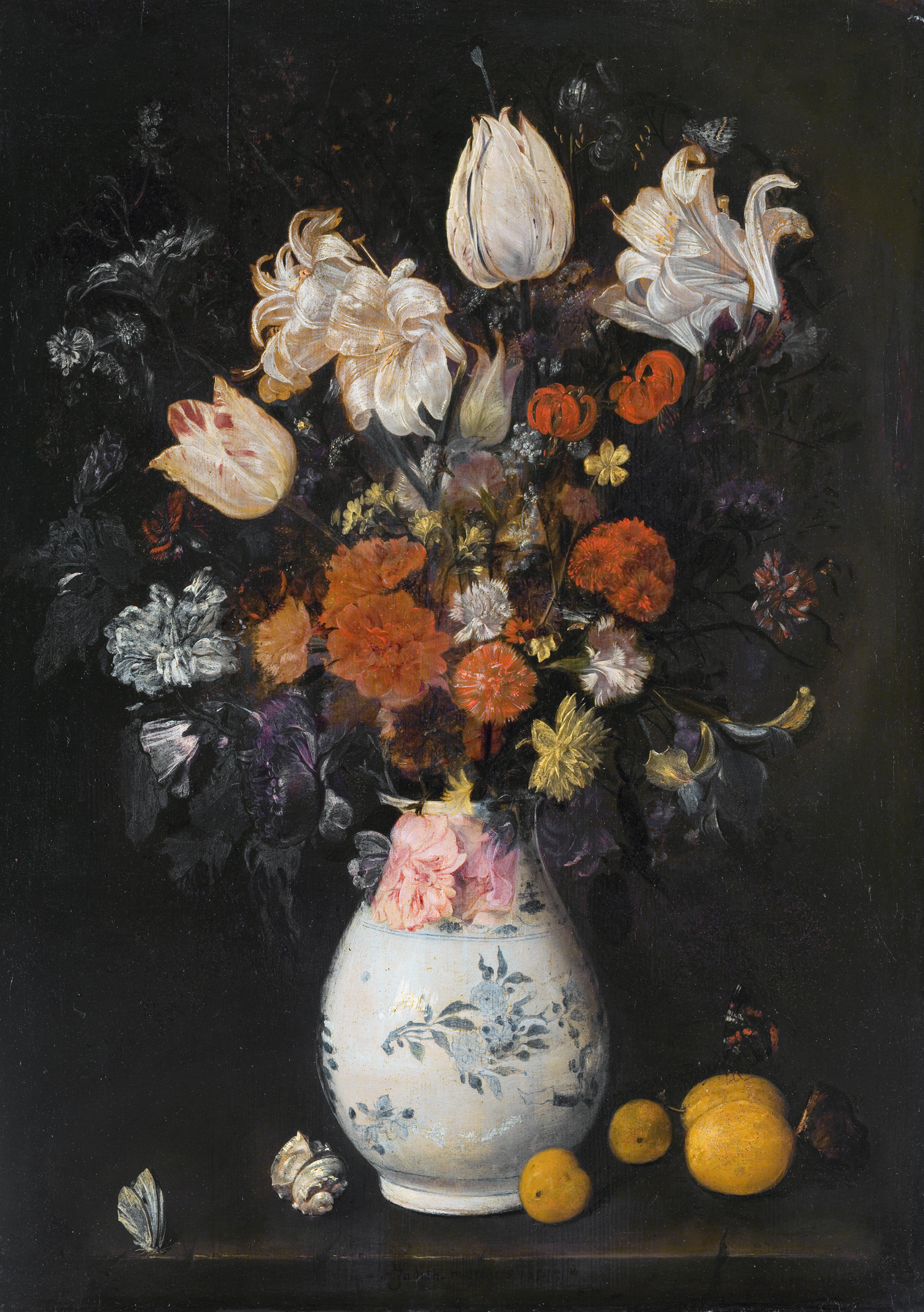
Blompotje (Flowers in a Vase) (1654)

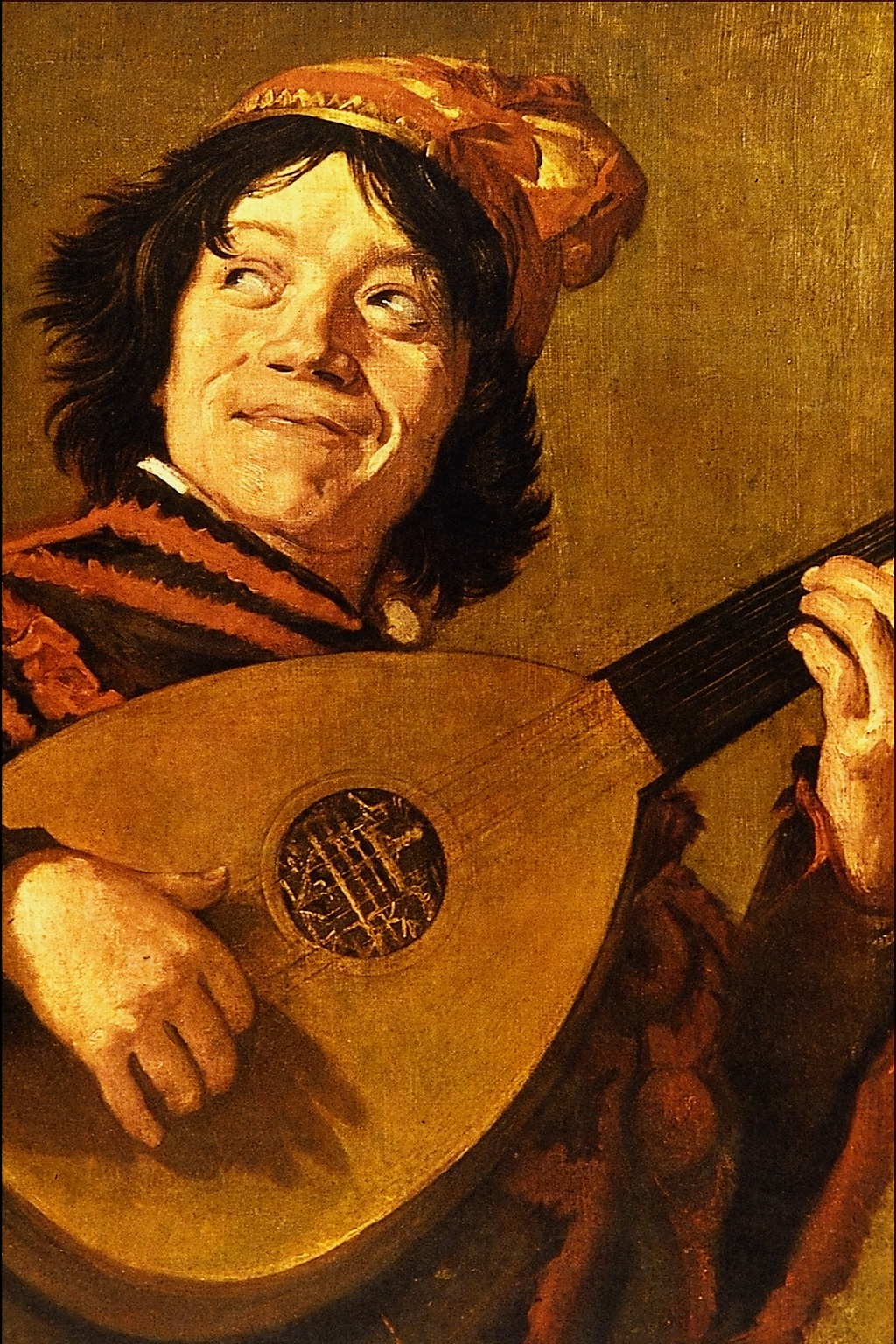
The Jester, after Frans Hals

== See also ==
- Maria de Grebber
- List of paintings by Judith Leyster
- List of paintings by Frans Hals
