= Jan Miense Molenaer =

Dutch painter (1610–1668)

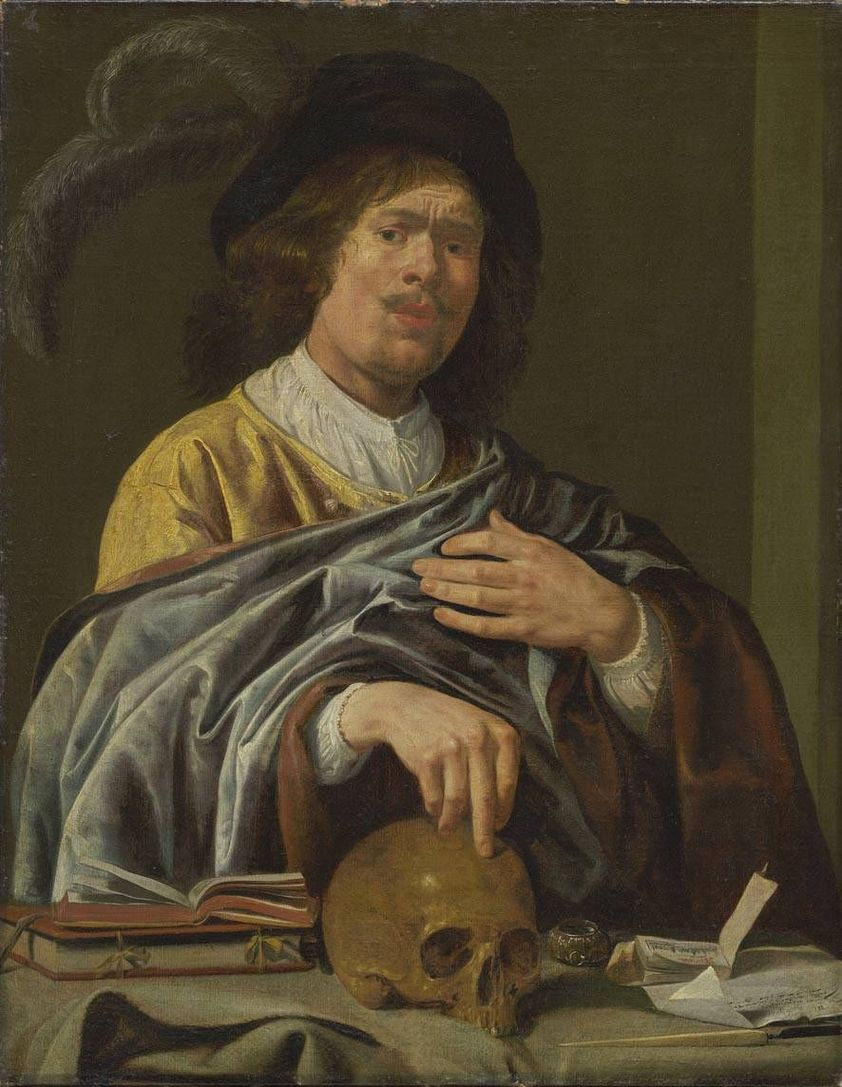
Self-portrait, 1640

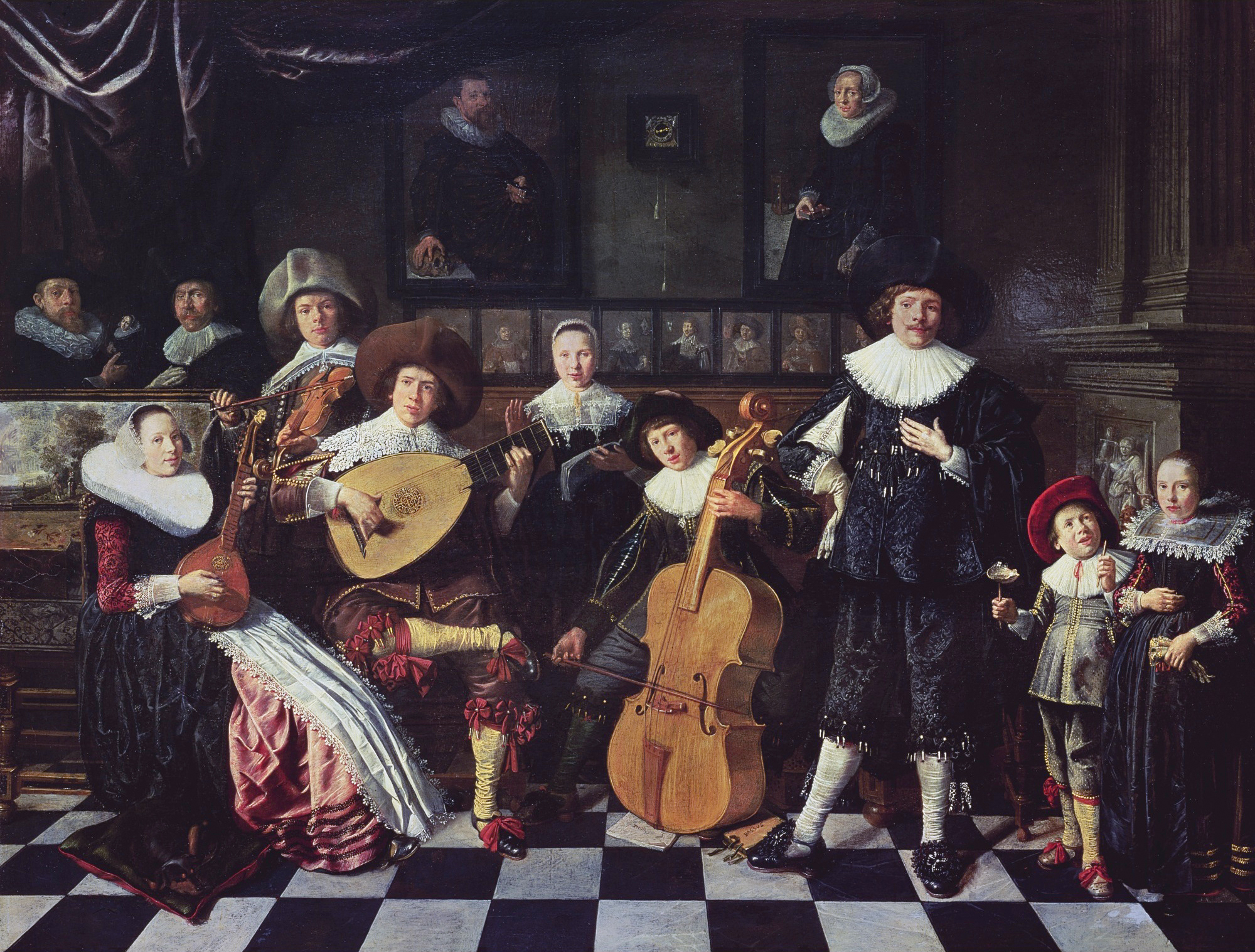
Family making Music, 1635–6.

Jan Miense Molenaer (1610 – buried 19 September 1668) was a Dutch Golden Age genre painter whose style was a precursor to Jan Steen's work during Dutch Golden Age painting. He shared a studio with his wife, Judith Leyster, also a genre painter, as well as a portraitist and painter of still-life. Both Molenaer and Leyster may have been pupils of Frans Hals.

== Biography ==
Molenaer was born and died in Haarlem. He achieved a style close to Hals' early on in his career, but later developed a style like that of Dutch genre painter, Adriaen van Ostade. His genre works often depicted players of music, such as his The Music Makers (Museum of Fine Arts, Budapest), The Duet (Seattle Art Museum), or Family Making Music (Frans Hals Museum). He also depicted Taverns and the activities of card games or games of the times such as La main chaude, or in Dutch, Handjeklap, which literally means clapping hands. Molenaer also cleverly depicted biblical stories in his own time and surroundings, such as representing a scene from Peter's Gospel set in a Dutch Tavern in The Denying of Peter (Museum of Fine Arts, Budapest).

== Selected works ==
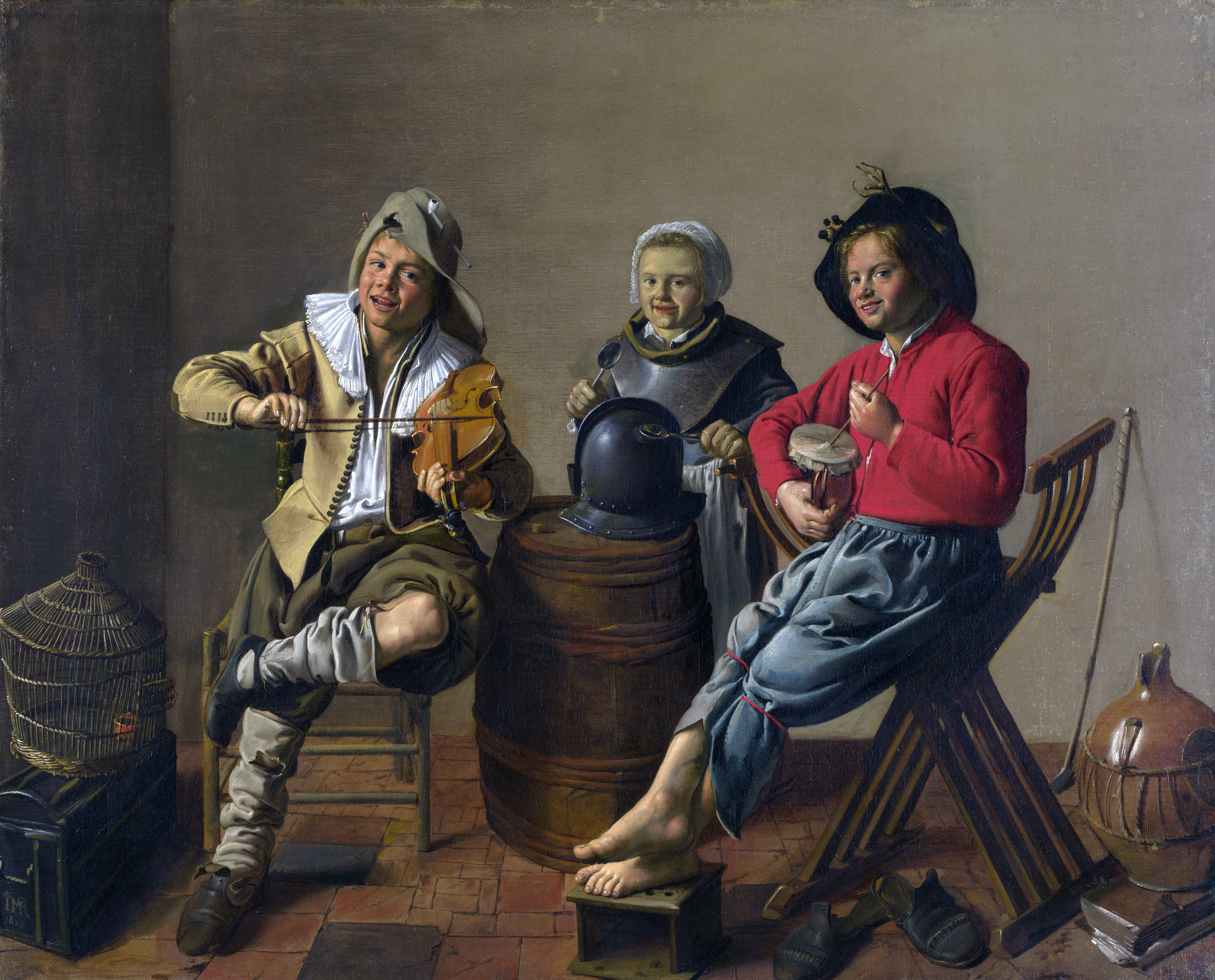
Two Boys and a Girl Making Music

- 1629 – The Dentist, Oil on panel, (North Carolina Museum of Art, Raleigh)
- 1629 – Two Boys and a Girl Making Music, Oil on canvas, (National Gallery, London)
- 1630 – A Quack and His Assistant, Oil on canvas, (Private Collection)
- 1630 – The Duet, Oil on canvas, (Seattle Art Museum, Seattle)
- 1630/32 – A Young Man playing a Theorbo and a Young Woman playing a Cittern, Oil on canvas, (National Gallery, London)
- 1631 – Painter in His Studio, Painting a Musical Company, Oil on canvas, (Staatliche Museen, Berlin)
- 1633 – Allegory of Vanity, Oil on canvas, (Toledo Museum of Art, Toledo)
- 1633 – Allegory of Marital Fidelity, Oil on canvas, (Virginia Museum of Fine Arts, Richmond)
- 1633/35 – Battle Between Carnival and Lent, Oil on wood, (Indianapolis Museum of Art, Indianapolis)
- 1635 – Card Players, Oil on panel, (Currier Museum of Art, Manchester)
- 1635 – Young Smoker, Oil on panel, (Accademia Carrara, Bergamo)
- 1635 – Family Making Music, Oil on panel, (Frans Hals Museum, Haarlem)
- 1636 – The Denying of Peter, Oil on canvas, (Museum of Fine Arts, Budapest)
- 1640s – Woman Holding a Jug, Oil on panel, (Museum of Fine Arts, Boston)
