= Battle Between Carnival and Lent =

Painting by Jan Miense Molenaer

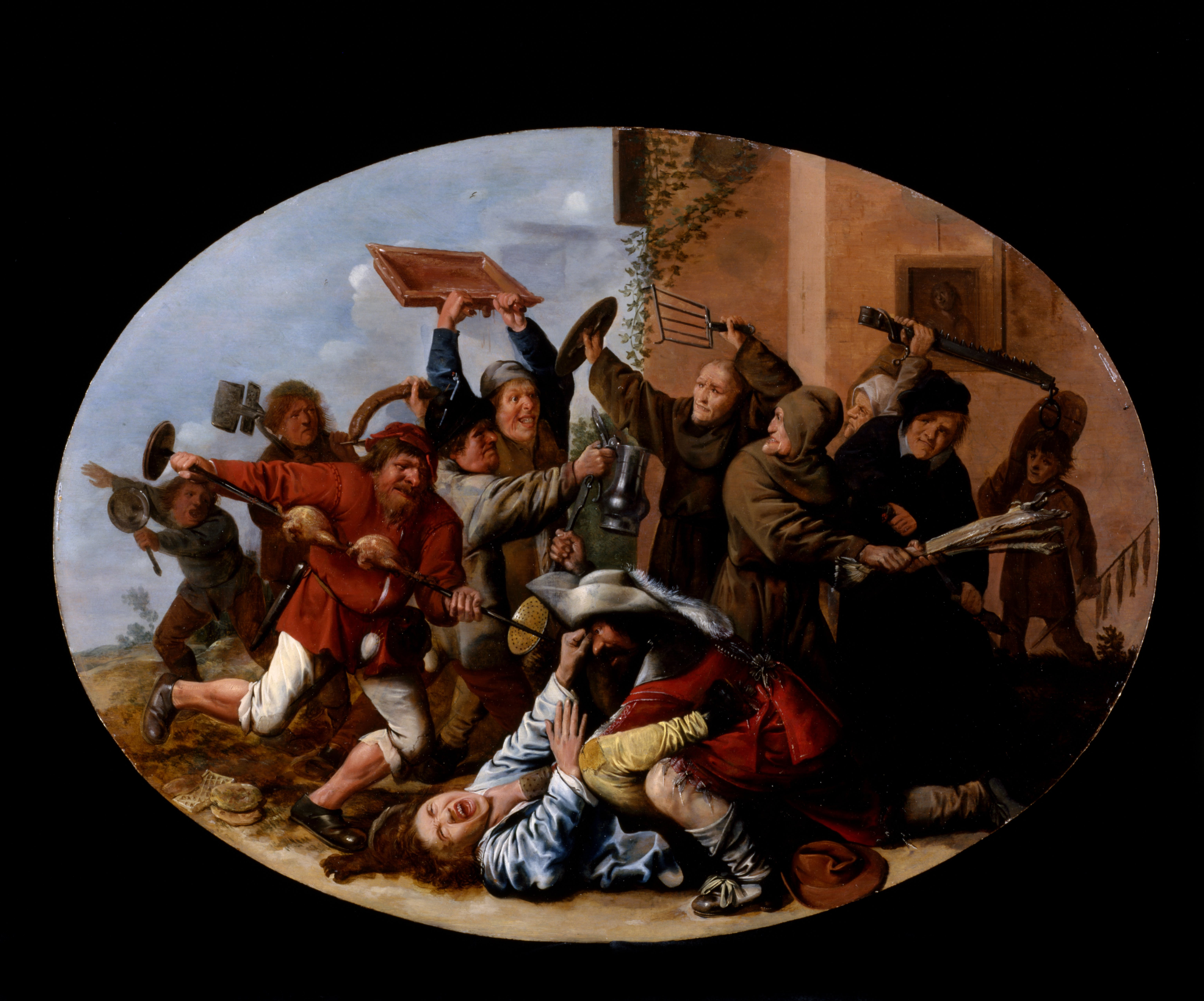
- Artist: Jan Miense Molenaer
- Year: 1633–1634
- Type: Oil painting on wood
- Dimensions: 40.6 cm × 55.2 cm (16.0 in × 21.7 in)
- Location: Indianapolis Museum of Art; Indianapolis

Battle Between Carnival and Lent is an oil painting by Dutch artist Jan Miense Molenaer, located in the Indianapolis Museum of Art in Indianapolis, Indiana. Painted ca. 1633–1634, it depicts a brawl between rowdy peasants, representing Carnival, and a group of monks, representing Lent. The rowdy combatants are armed with comical implements representing their sides, such as a peasant with a beer tankard battling a monk armed with fish.

== Description ==
This painting is based on the mock battles that occurred as the revelry of Carnival gave way to Lenten abstinence. The peasants on the side of Carnival are armed with beer tankards, cooking implements, and sausage, while the monks and priests who stand for Lent brandish dried codfish. This comic scene is both a condemnation of the immorality that had come to mark many Roman Catholic feasts, and a subtler commentary about the struggle between the Protestant Dutch Republic and the Catholic Southern Netherlands, which were subjugated by Spain. This critique is clearest in the soldier choking a Dutch boy in the foreground. Although the figures are all very engaging and animated, their imperfect anatomy marks this as one of Molenaer's earlier efforts.

== Historical information ==
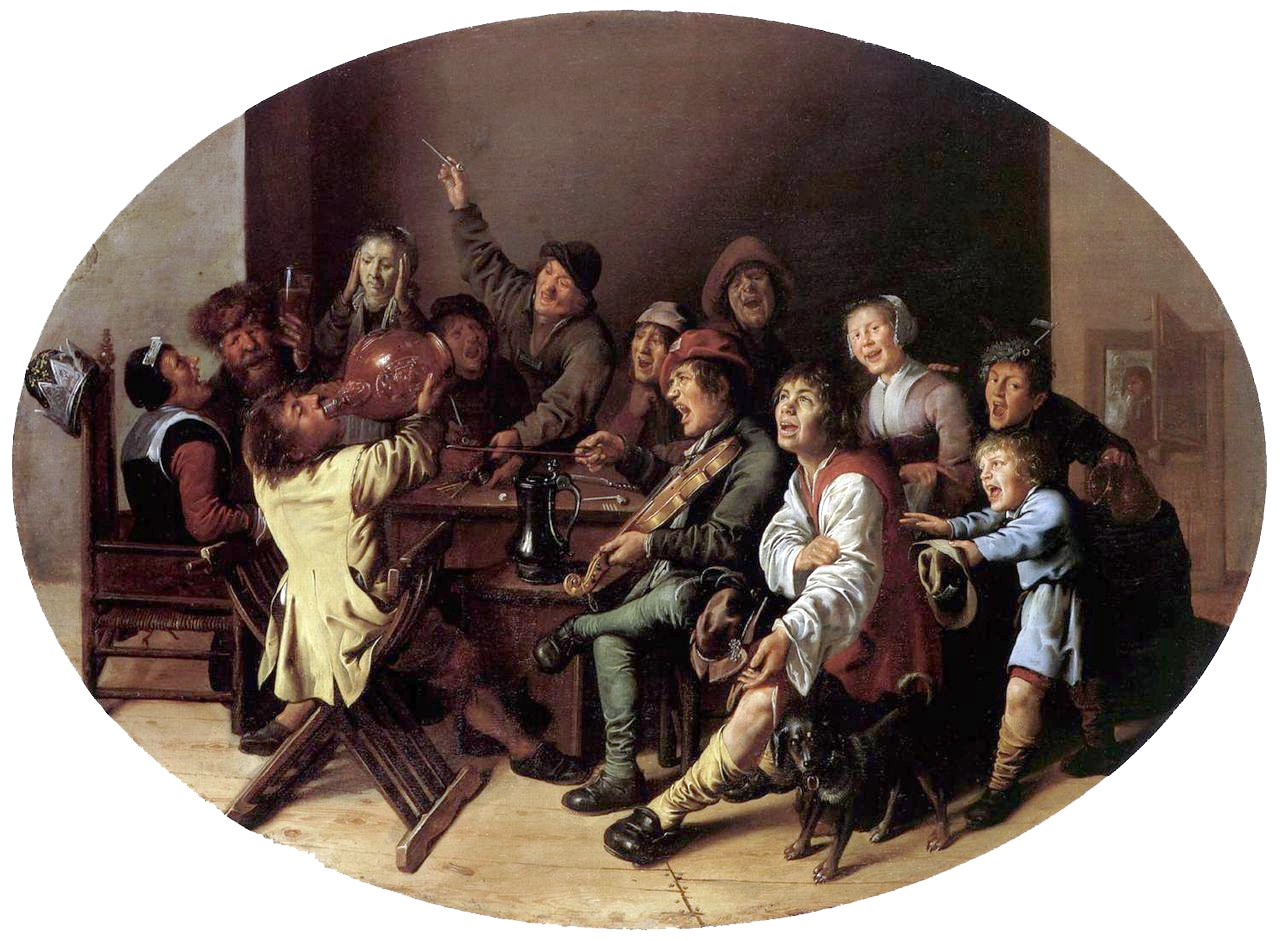
The King Drinks, c. 1635, Liechtenstein Collection

Based upon their similar sizes, shapes, and subject matter, Battle Between Carnival and Lent was probably originally paired with The King Drinks as a pendant. That painting, from ca. 1635, depicts the revelry of Twelfth Night, the eve of the Feast of the Epiphany, again using the overindulgence of the peasants as a warning against gluttony and impiety. Of the two, Battle Between Carnival and Lent is the more polished artwork.

=== Acquisition ===
The IMA acquired Battle Between Carnival and Lent in 1998. It was purchased in honor of A. Ian Fraser, with additional funding provided by the David L. Chambers, Jr. Fund for Dutch and Flemish Art, the Dr. V.K. Stoelting Art Fund, and Jane W. Myers. It has the accession number 1998.96.

== See also ==
- The Fight Between Carnival and Lent, painted by Pieter Bruegel the Elder in 1559
