= Jolly Toper =

Painting by Judith Leyster

The Jolly Toper
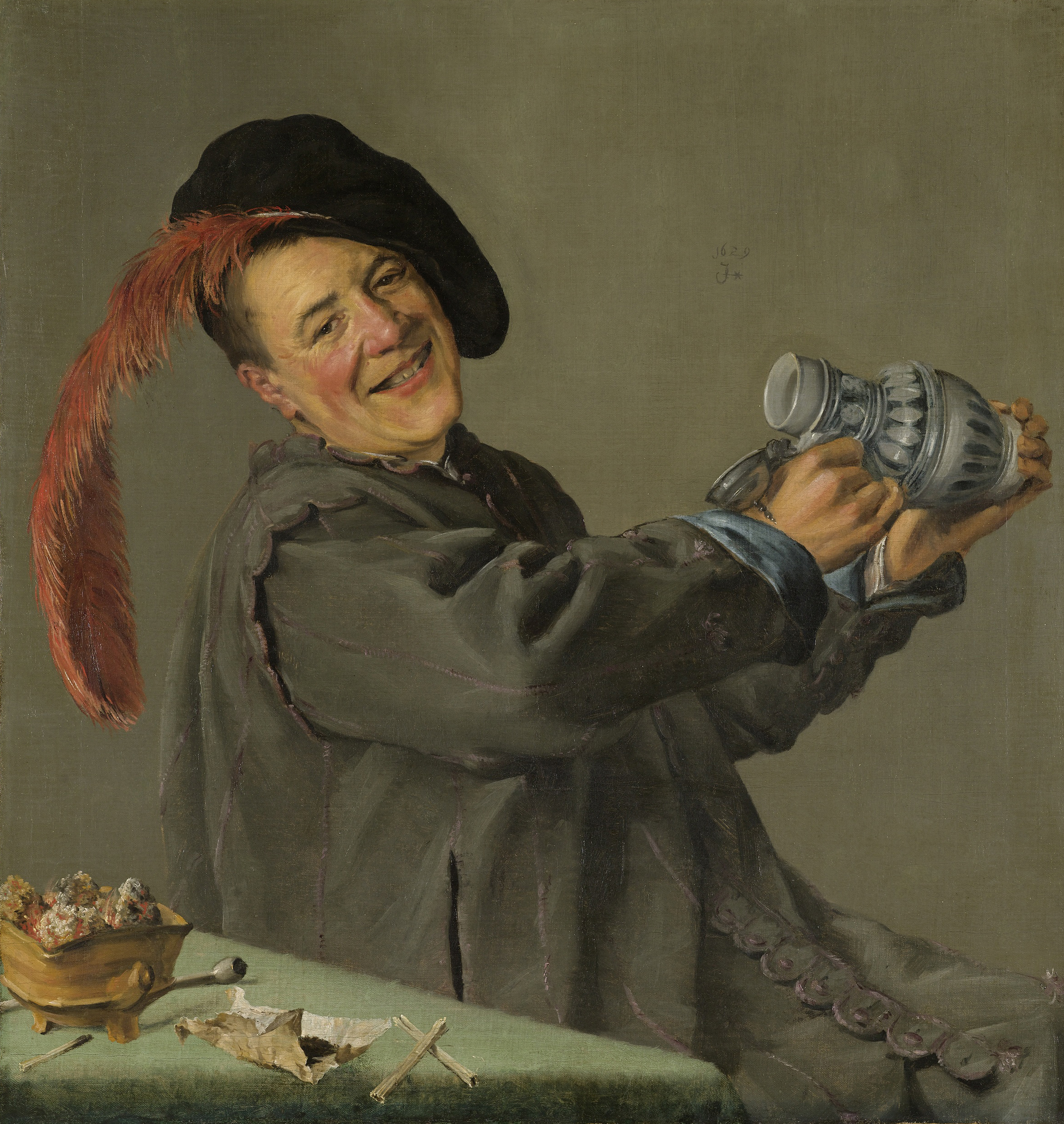
- Artist: Judith Leyster
- Year: 1629
- Medium: Oil on canvas
- Dimensions: 89 cm × 85 cm (35 in × 33 in)
- Location: Frans Hals Museum; Haarlem

The Jolly Toper is a 1629 oil painting by the Dutch artist Judith Leyster in the collection of the Rijksmuseum that is on long-term loan to the Frans Hals Museum since 1959. It was acquired by the museum as a painting by Frans Hals and was attributed to Leyster by the researcher Juliane Harms in 1927.

== Provenance ==
The painting was sold in Hotel Drouot in Paris in 1890 as by Hals or a son to Schiff and was bought by the Rijksmuseum in 1897 from F. Kleinberger of Paris. The painting is signed and dated on the back wall above the tankard.

According to Hofrichter, the scene shows the popular Peeckelhaeringh figure in 17th-century comic plays. The Peeckelhaeringh or Pekelharing character is often shown as a "Kannenkijker", or jug-looker. This is a signal that the mug is empty and the show is over. The figure in this painting bears a resemblance to another, similar painting, also by Leyster, but less finished.

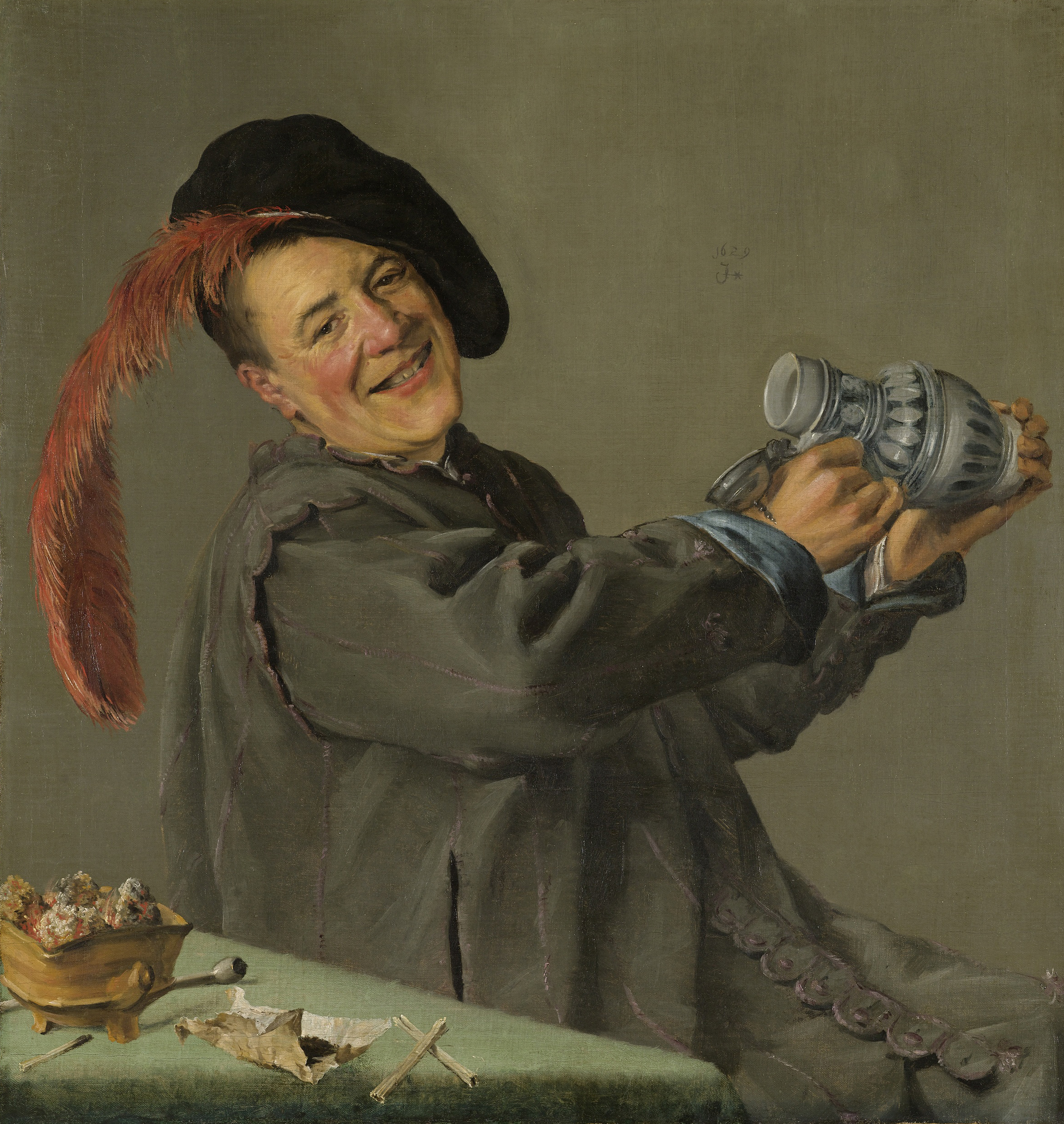

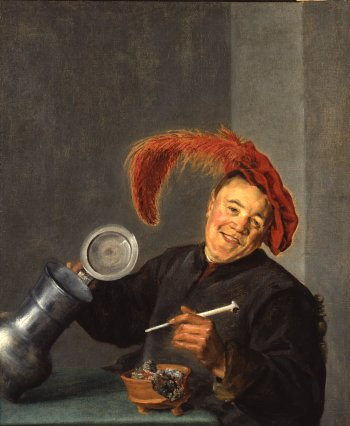

== See also ==
- List of paintings by Judith Leyster
