= The Fight Between Carnival and Lent =

Painting by Pieter Bruegel the Elder

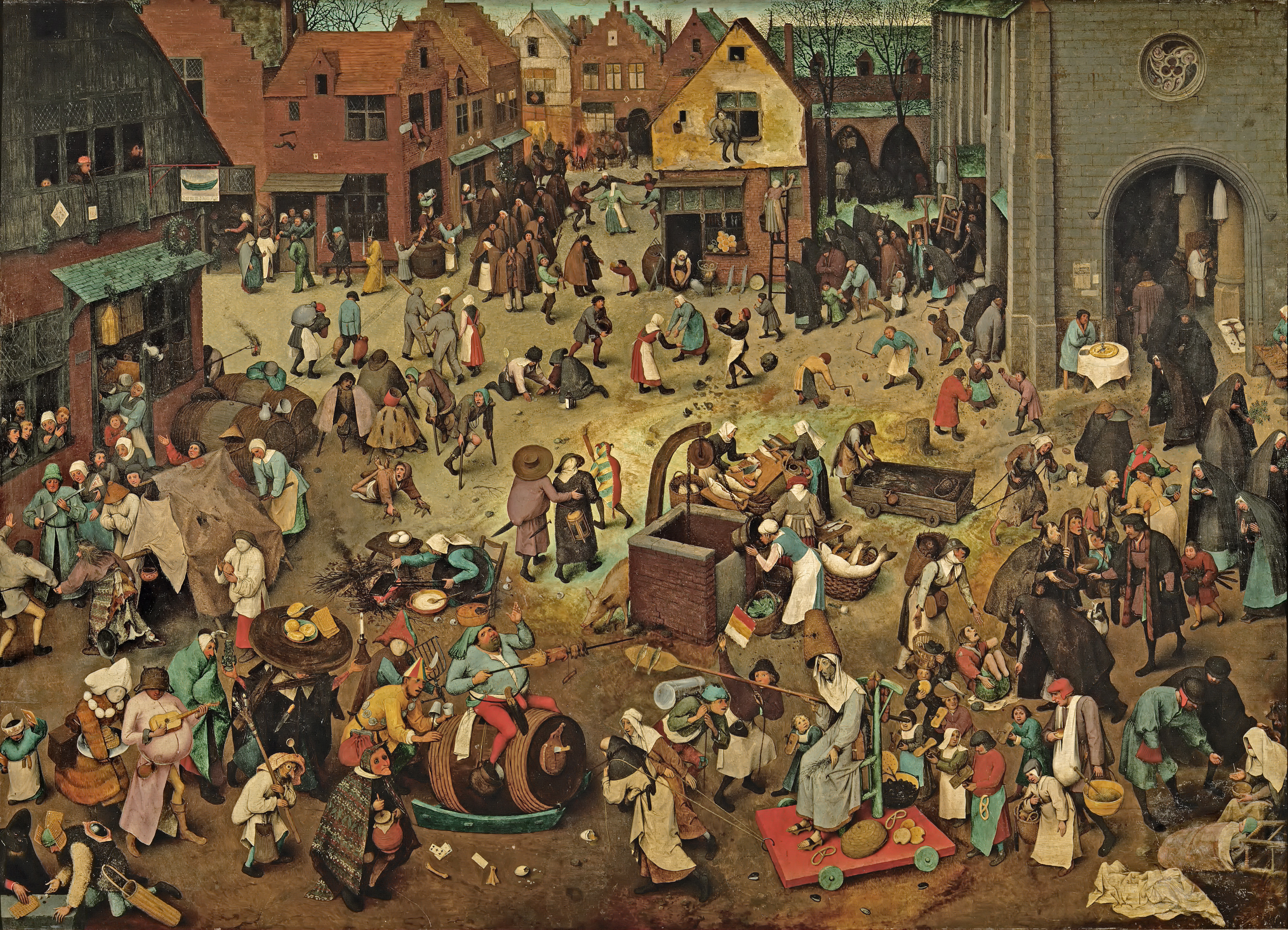
- Artist: Pieter Bruegel the Elder
- Year: 1559
- Medium: oil on panel
- Dimensions: 118 cm × 164 cm (46 in × 65 in)
- Location: Kunsthistorisches Museum, Vienna

The Fight Between Carnival and Lent (Dutch: De strijd tussen Vasten en Vastenavond) is an oil-on-panel painting executed by the Dutch and Flemish Renaissance painter Pieter Bruegel the Elder in 1559. It is a panorama of contemporary life in the Southern Netherlands. While the painting contains nearly 200 characters, it is unified under the theme of the transition from Shrove Tuesday to Lent, the period forty days before Easter.

== History ==
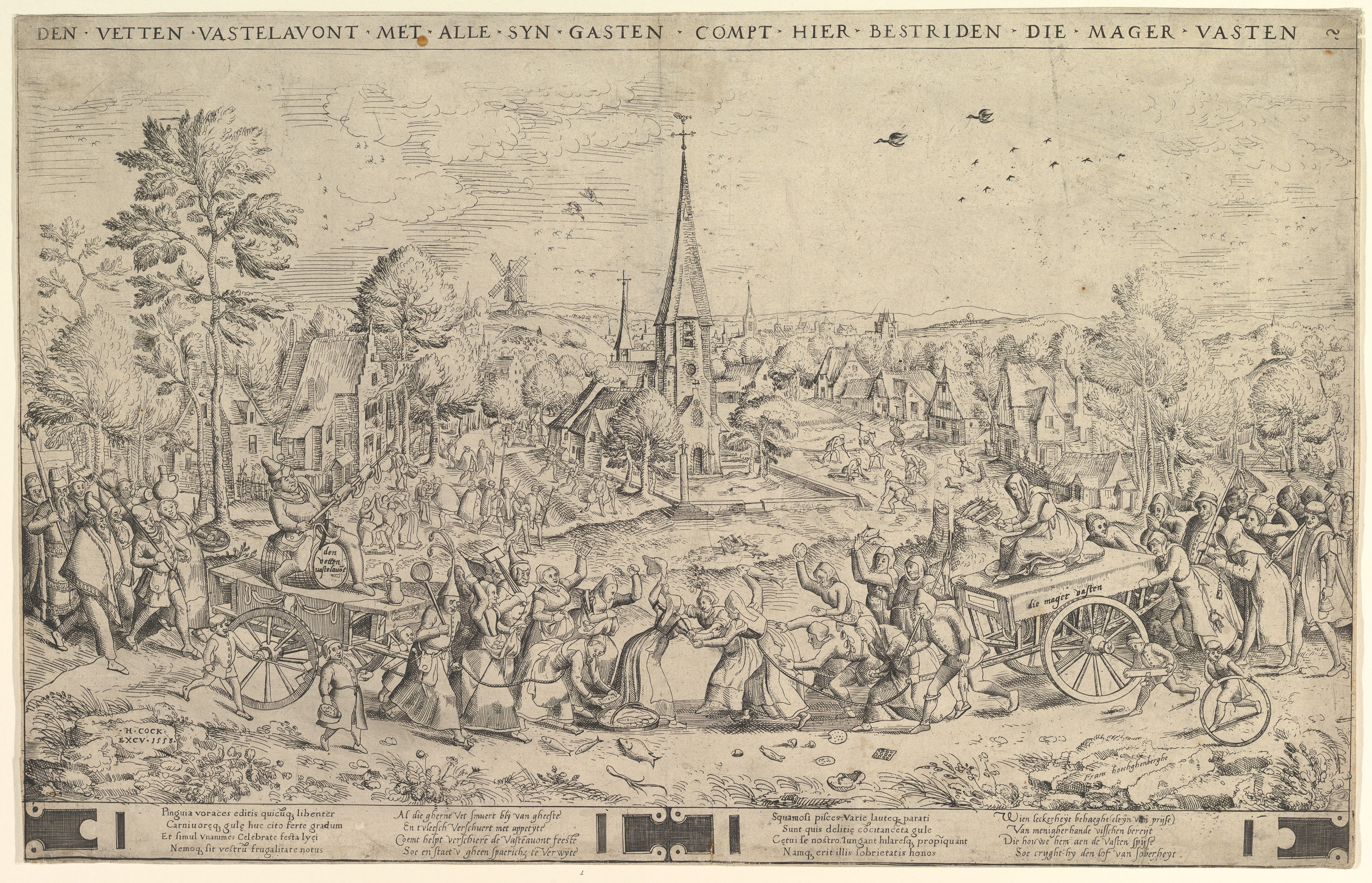
Lent and Carnival (1558), etching by Hieronymus Cock after Frans Hogenberg, Metropolitan Museum of Art in New York

The literary theme of the struggle between personifications of Shrove Tuesday and Lent dates as far back as the year 400 with the Psychomachia. The 13th-century French poem La Bataille de Caresme et de Charnage describes a symbolic battle between different foods, meat against fish. A likely graphic precursor of the painting is Lent and Carnival, a 1558 etching by Hieronymus Cock after Frans Hogenberg, in which the personifications of lean and fat are driven together on carts by their supporters. The supporters attack each other with fish, waffles, cookies and eggs.

Also in 1559, Bruegel produced a series of prints of the Seven Virtues, which have formal similarities: an allegorical figure, against a background with a high horizon line, is surrounded by a crowd of figures who carry out various activities related to the subject. In the same year, Bruegel painted Netherlandish Proverbs, also modelled on a print by Hogenberg. The following year he produced Children's Games. These three works are closely related, each forming a catalogue of folk customs. The works mark the transition of Bruegel from draughtsman to the painter of grand panels for which he is now known.

== Composition ==
In the foreground is the battle itself: the two opponents, Carnival and Lent, pulled and pushed and accompanied by supporters, are about to meet. Carnival is seated on a large beer barrel and Lent is opposite him seated on a shallow pull cart. The painting does not present either side as being better than the other, but presents both sides as extremes of the human experience.

It is typical of the world landscape style, in which an imaginary panoramic landscape is seen from an elevated viewpoint. The horizon is high in the picture, giving the viewer a bird's eye view of the scene. The physical painting is large, and the characters are small, which means that nearly 200 characters fit into the scene, mostly in groupings.

A market square of an unspecified village in the Netherlands is shown. Themes in the scene would have been nostalgic for contemporary viewers, since it depicts an older and more rural style of improvised celebration, in contrast to the highly organized professional processions which would have been seen at that time in Antwerp.

The spectacle is divided into two halves, and framed by two buildings: the inn on the left, the church on the right, which gives it the character of a scene in a stage show. The left side of the sprawling canvas depicts the Carnival, the right side, Lent. The boundary is not sharply defined, however, and in several places the followers of Lent and Shrove Tuesday invade each other's space. The painting depicts different times of year. Barren, wintery, trees on the left hint at the winter, while the budding trees of the churchyard's lenten side hint at a burgeoning spring.

== Detail ==
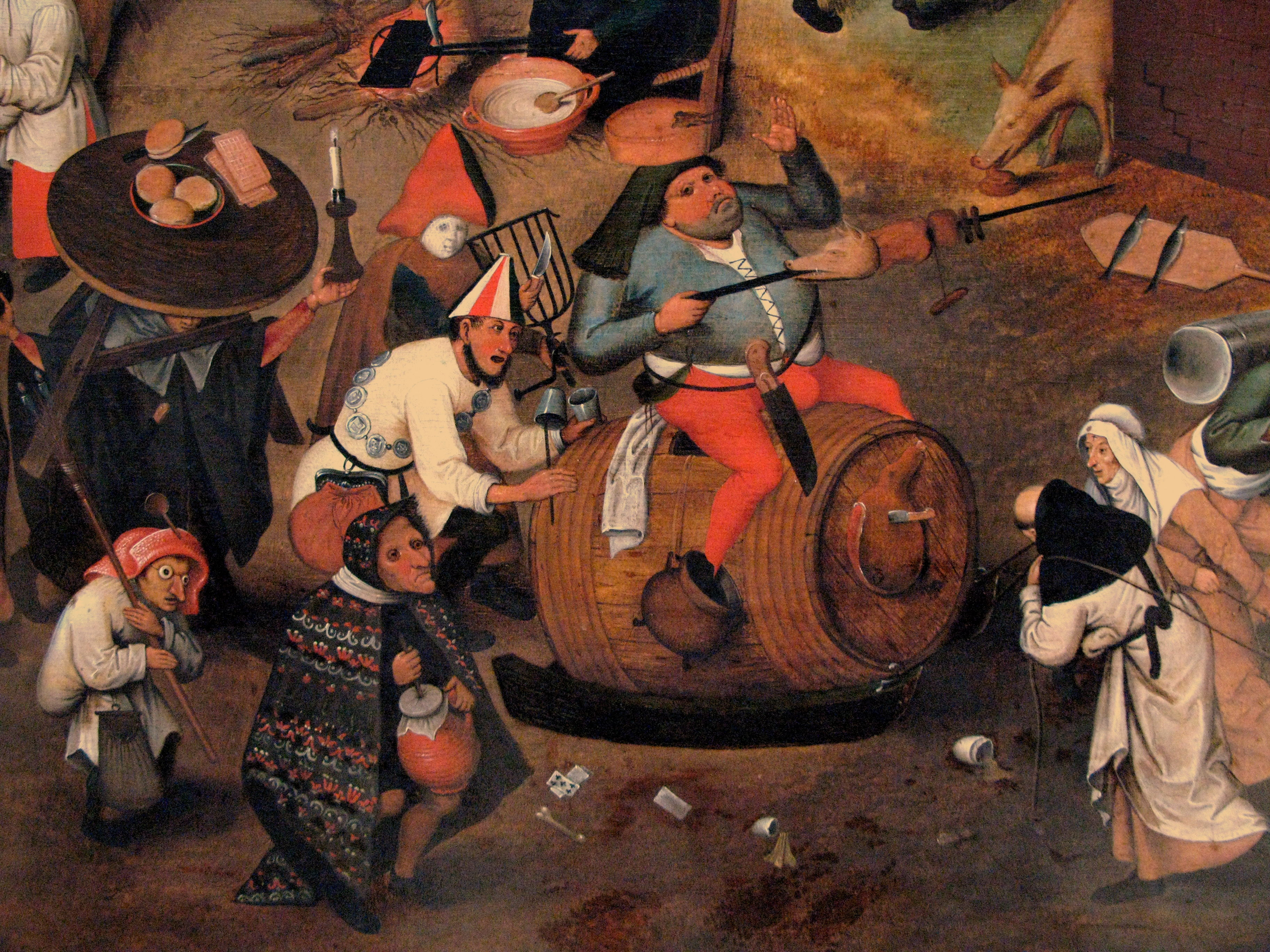
The figure of Carnival (detail)

The figure of Lent (detail)

=== Foreground ===
In the foreground, the two antagonists, Carnival and Lent, are in a parody of a late medieval joust. The two opponents do not ride head-on into each other, but rather pass each other by, trying to lift each other out of the saddle.

They are borne on what resemble contemporary carnival floats. Both characters wear a headdress which makes it clear that they are allegorical characters. Carnival wears a poultry pie with the legs of a crow sticking out. Lent wears a beehive, a common symbol for the church at the time.

Carnival is a fat butcher, with his pouch of knives, straddling a beer barrel on a blue sled. A pork chop is attached to the front of the barrel, and a cooking pot serves as a stirrup. His weapon is a rotisserie carrying the head of a suckling pig, poultry and sausages. Two men pull his sled. One of them waves a red-gold-white flag, the then typical carnival colors. Carnival's followers form a procession of figures wearing masks, bizarre headgear and household objects as props or improvised musical instruments, in a reversal of the normal order. The followers are provided with wafers and cakes. In the foreground are bones, egg shells, and playing cards.

Lent is a thin woman, seated on a hard three-legged chair, and armed with a baker's spatula called a peel, on which lie two herring. She is surrounded by pretzels, fish, fasting breads, mussels, and onions, all typically consumed during Lent. Lent is laboriously drawn by a monk and a nun. Her entourage consists of children, who, like Lent, have the ash cross of Ash Wednesday on their foreheads. They make noise with clappers. A church minister accompanies the children, carrying a bucket with a holy water brush and a bag for donations, which include dry rolls, pretzels and shoes.

=== Left side ===
The left side is dominated by an inn, which according to its signboard is called the Blau Schuyt (Blue Barge), referencing a Middle Dutch poem popular during Lenten celebrations, in which the bourgeois world was turned upside down. In and around the inn, there is heavy drinking. Through an upper floor window we see an encounter between two lovers. To the left, a musician with his bagpipes hangs out of the window to vomit.

In front of the inn, actors perform The Dirty Bride, a play in which a peasant in a drunken stupor agrees to marry, but upon sobering up discovers how his bride looks. The painting shows the bride and groom dancing, while a masked member of the company collects money with a piggy bank.

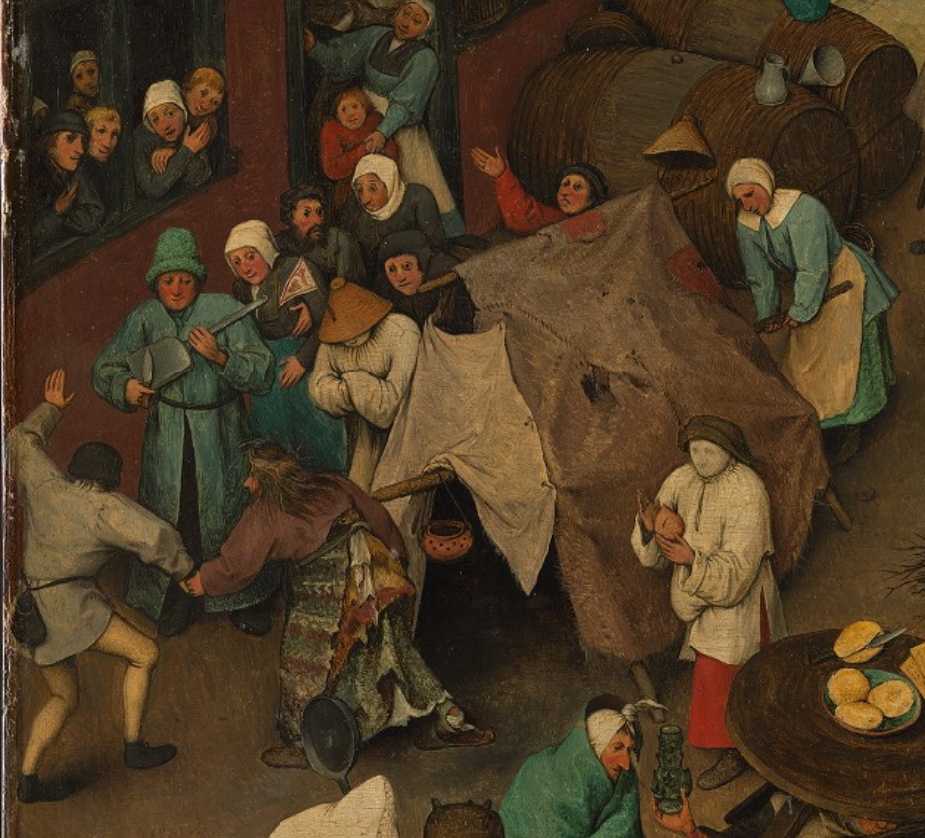
The Dirty Bride (detail)

Across the street, another group of dramatists performs The Catch of the Wild Man. Above Carnival, a woman bakes waffles. A procession of lepers, led by a bagpiper, winds past.

=== Right side ===
Just inside the church a veiled statue is visible. It was customary in Roman Catholic churches to cover artwork from Passion Sunday to Easter. Outside, a man sits at a table with a relic that the pious can pay to touch. A woman at a stall sells votive offerings. A man and a woman pray kneeling against the wall of the church.

From a side door of the church, the poorer faithful emerge: some have brought their own seating, which they carry. The wealthier citizens, who have been allowed to sit on a bench in the church, leave the church by the main entrance; one gentleman is accompanied by a servant who carries his own folding chair. Some women in black cloaks carry boxwood branches, a custom associated with Palm Sunday. The wealthy have been reminded of their obligation to charity by the Lenten sermon, so they give alms to the numerous beggars.

Unlike the group of beggars on the left, who have no audience, the beggars on the right receive the full attention of the churchgoers. Behind the man who is missing both feet and a forearm, a woman is wearing pilgrim insignia, but in the basket on her back is a monkey, which indicates feigning.

Technologies such as X-rays have revealed changes to Bruegel's work by an unknown hand. A bloated corpse, partially covered by a white shroud, has been hidden. In the original, the wheeled container with wheels, to the right of the fish stall, contains a human figure. These figures are also visible in copies made in Bruegel's time.

The background is dominated by people working, primarily with food: women preparing Lenten fish, men carrying wine from the inn and a woman making waffles. At the very back of the picture, other festivities are going on with a bonfire, dancing figures and beggars spread across the whole scene.

=== Centre ===
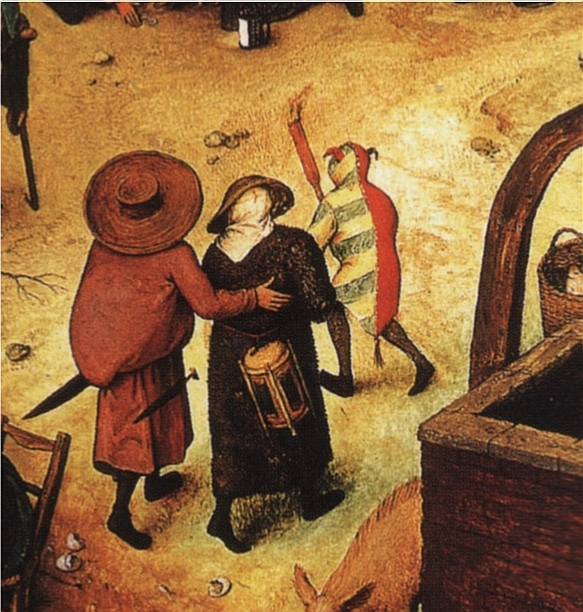
The man and woman led by a fool (detail)

In the centre are scenes that cannot be clearly connected to either side. At the back is a bakery with ware displayed for sale. Dried fish hang in front of the window. A woman is polishing the utensils. Another woman is doing spring cleaning and has climbed a ladder to clean the overhead light from the outside. In front of the bakery, two young men and two young women are playing an agility game where it involves throwing up old earthenware cooking pots and catching them. That it is not easy is testified by the shards of fallen ones on the ground.

At the centre of the market square is a public well. On its right side, a woman has just drawn the clear water; at her feet is a basket of fresh vegetables. The freshness of this scene stands in sharp contrast to the pig at left of the well. A fish stall offers a wide range of fresh and dried fish, perhaps acting as a counterpoint to the waffle maker on the left.

To the left of the well, in an area brightly lit, walks a couple, seen only from the back. They have taken part in the carnival event: the man is dressed up by tucking a straw bag as a hunchback under his clothes, the woman carries a non-burning lantern around the waist. In front of them, a jester heads to the left. The man and the woman, on the other hand, seem to turn away from the bustle and continue along the lighted path to the right side of the square. For them, the party has ended, and the time for repentance and moderation has come.

== Production and copies ==
It is an oil painting on oak planks taken from a single tree from the area around the Baltic Sea. The panel was prepared by applying a primer of chalk and animal glue to it and polishing it smooth. No additional imprimatura was used, and the warm tonality of the primer shines through in the final work. The signature is applied with black chalk.

Eighteen copies were made, of which five were by Brueghel's son Pieter Brueghel the Younger or his studio.

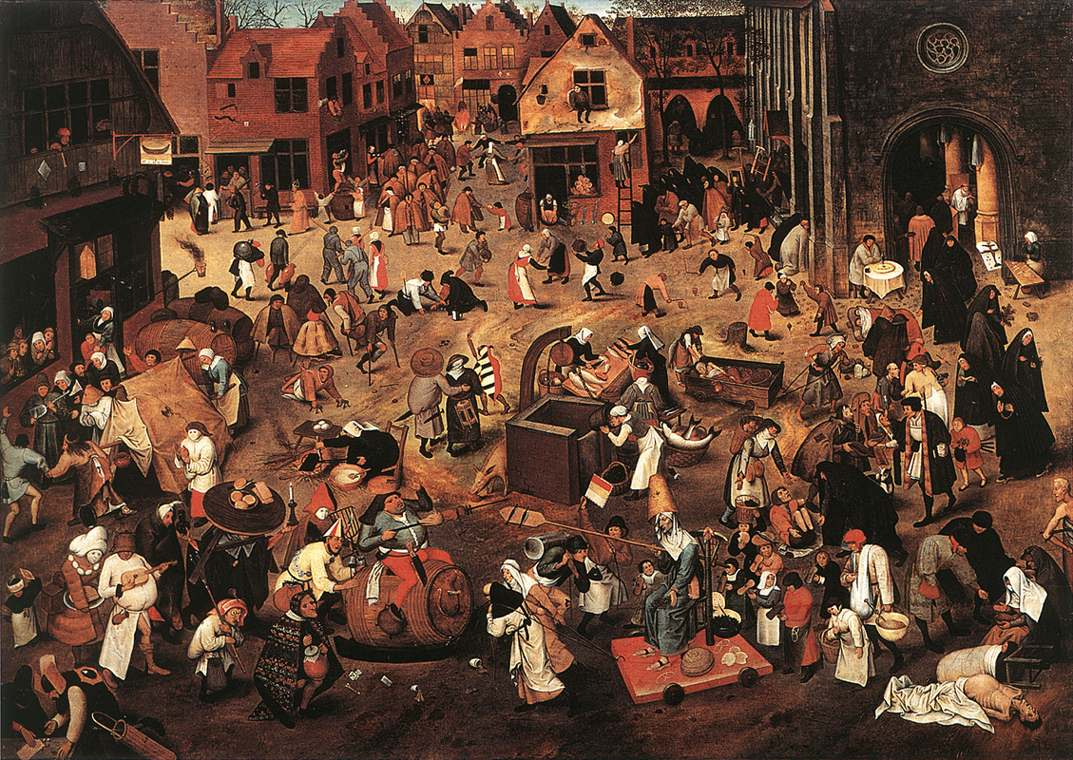
Versie in Brussel (E 183)

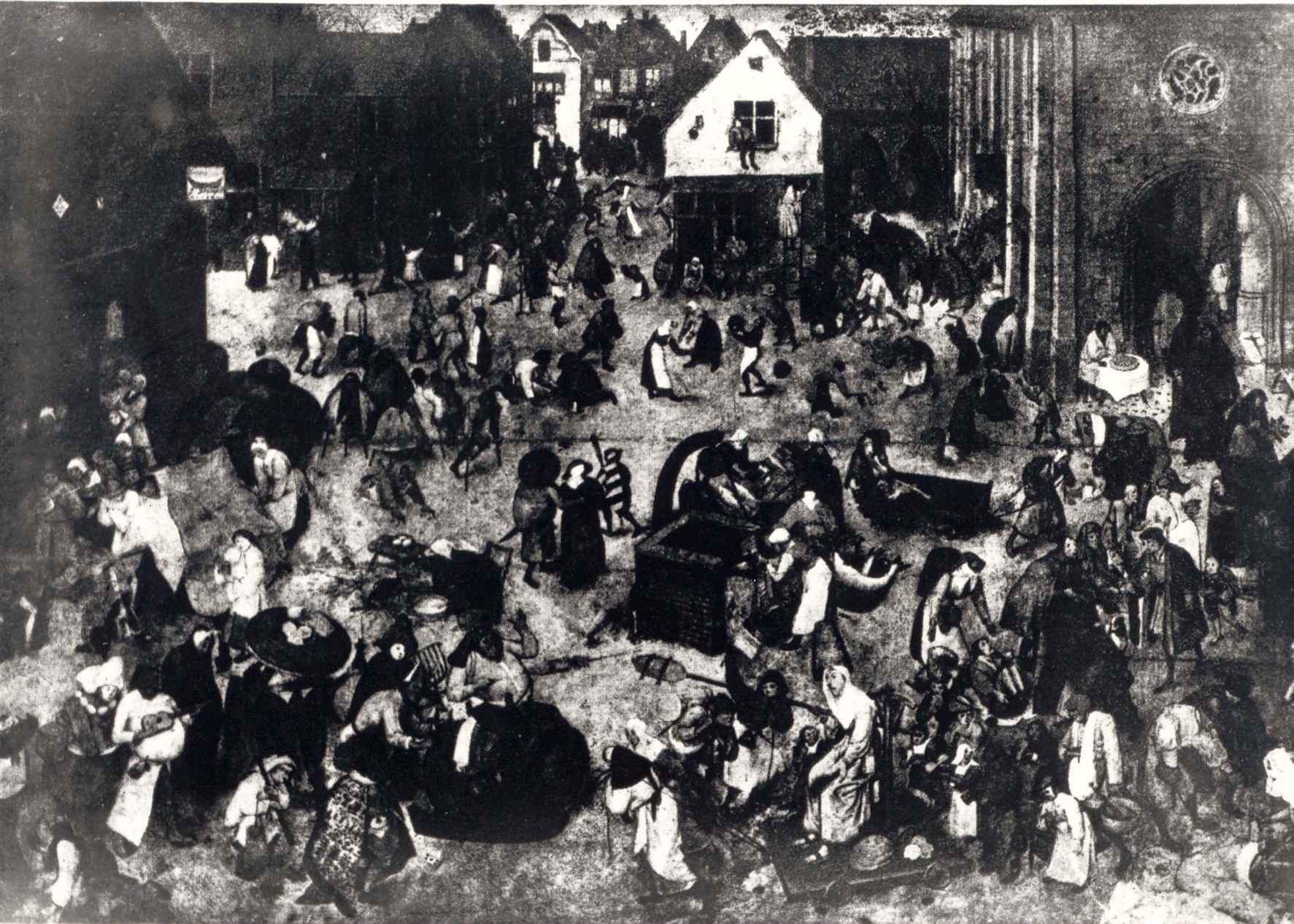
Verdwenen versie uit Krakau (E 184)

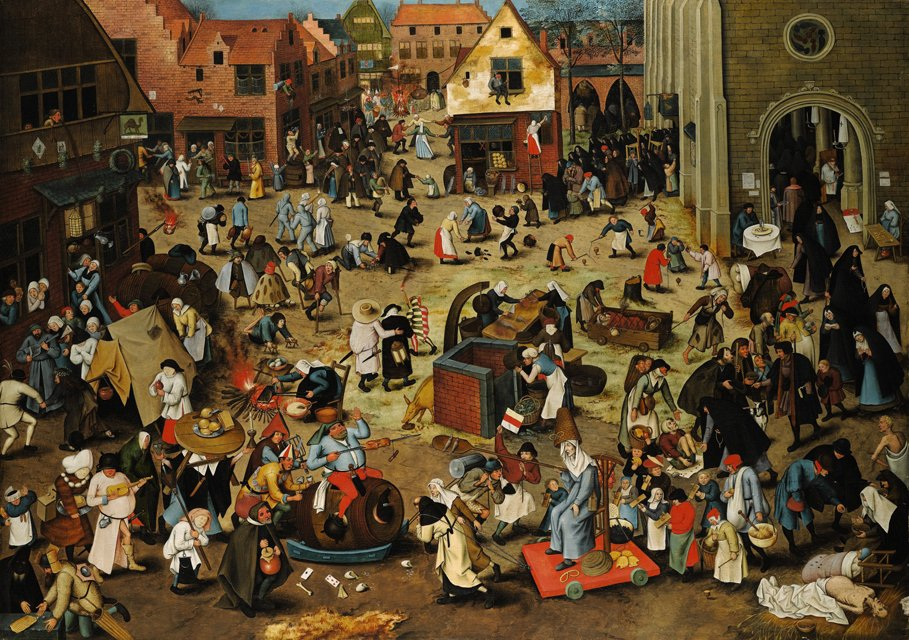
Sotheby's, 2012 (E 185)

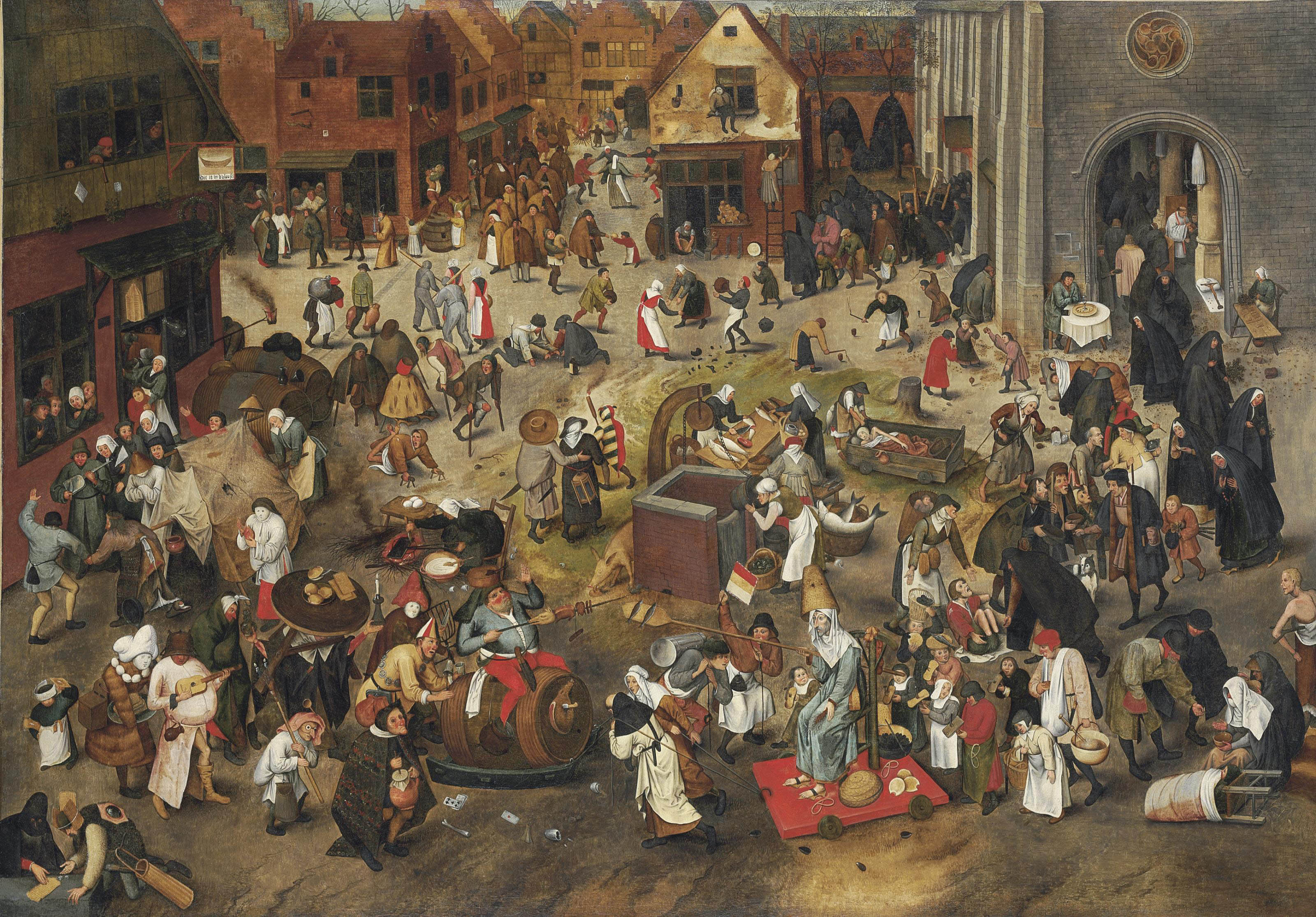
Christie's, 2011 (E 186)

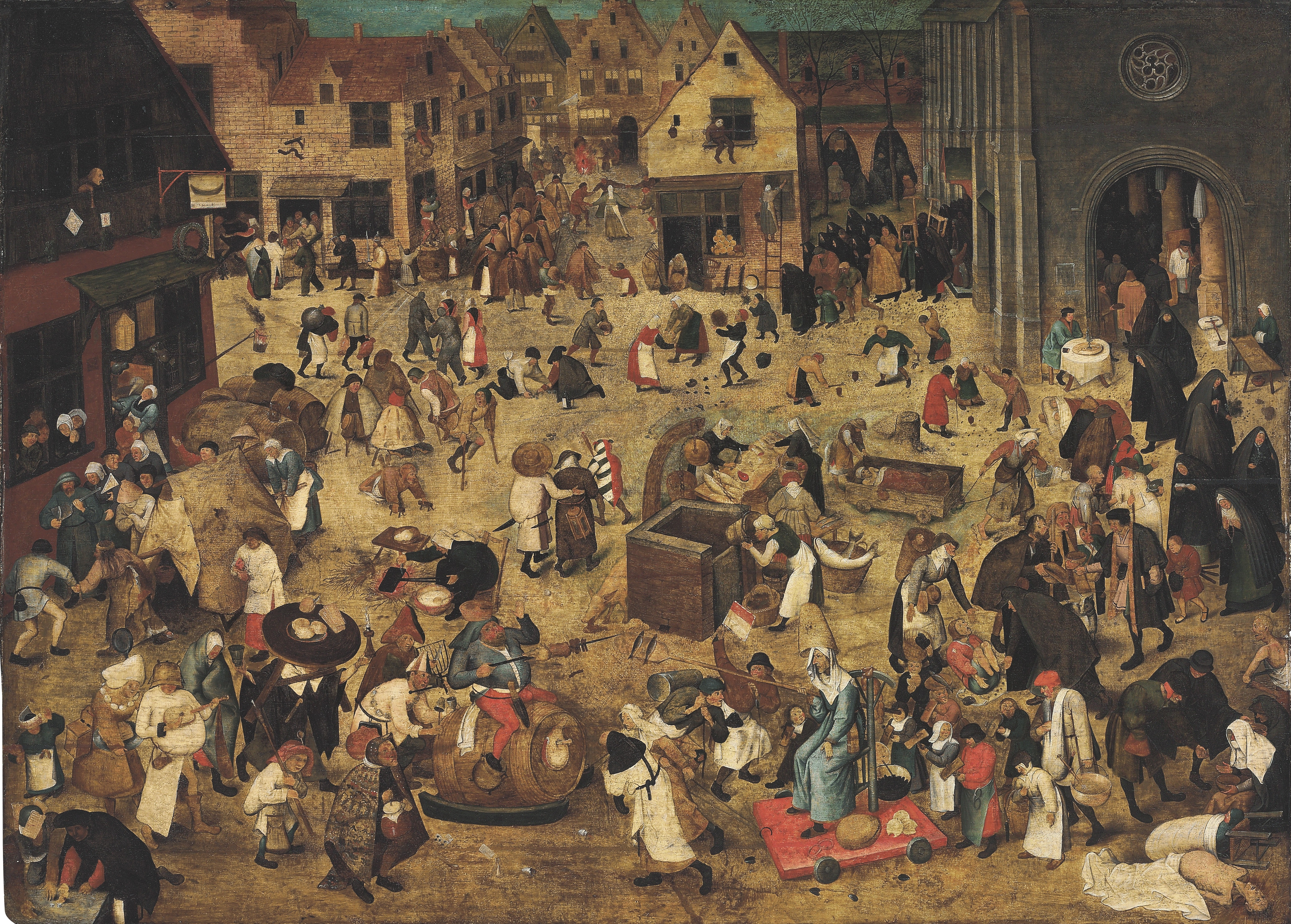
Christie's, 2010

== See also ==
- List of paintings by Pieter Bruegel the Elder
