= The Last Drop (Leyster) =

Painting by Judith Leyster

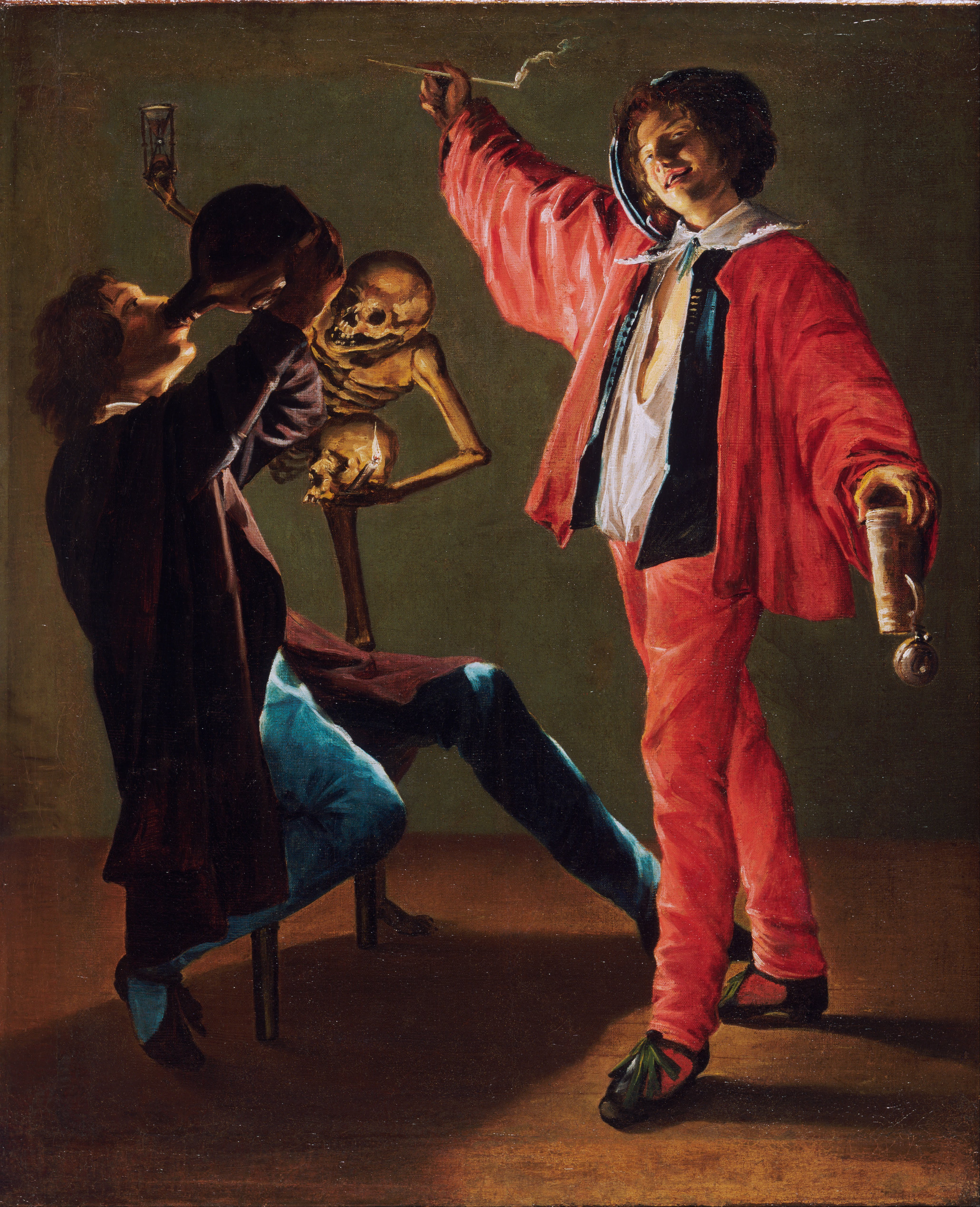
- Artist: Judith Leyster
- Year: c. 1629
- Medium: Oil on canvas
- Dimensions: 89 cm × 73.7 cm (35 in × 29.0 in)
- Location: Philadelphia Museum of Art; Philadelphia

The Last Drop is a c. 1629 oil painting by Judith Leyster in the John G. Johnson collection of the Philadelphia Museum of Art. It was regarded as a work by Frans Hals until 1903, when it was noticed that it is signed 'JL*' on the tankard.

== Background ==
=== The artist ===
Judith Leyster was a well-known artist during the seventeenth century; however, her reputation was forgotten soon after her death. There were no mentions of her name to be found in sales records and no prints made of her artwork. However, early in her career, she was recognized as the very first woman artist in the Haarlem Guild of St. Luke. It was not until 1893 that Judith Leyster was rediscovered and was given recognition as a leading woman in Dutch Golden Age painting.

=== Provenance ===
Judith Leyster's The Last Drop was in the collection of Sir George Donaldson in London around 1903. The canvas was then sold from the collection of Cornelis Hoogendijk at Frederik Muller & Co, Amsterdam, on April 28 or 29, 1908. From there, it was acquired by John G. Johnson for the Philadelphia Museum of Art in Philadelphia.

=== Misattribution ===
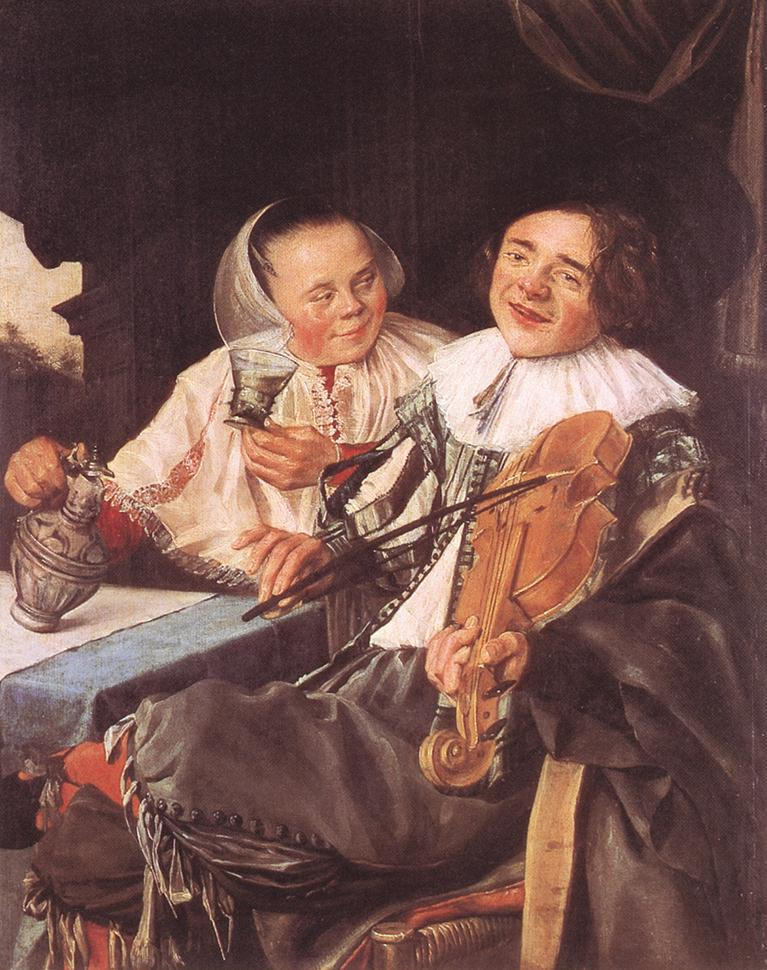
Judith Leyster - Carousing Couple - WGA12954

Leyster did not date The Last Drop and Merry Trio; therefore Juliane Harms dated her work within the years of 1631 to 1633. These were the dates of Leyster's other candlelit paintings, for example, The Proposition. In 1642 it was recorded that an art dealer named Emanuel Burck sold art pieces signed with the name "Judith Molenaer" and "Judith Leyster". Molenaer was her married name from her husband Jan Miense Molenaer. It is possible that Emanuel Burck personally knew Leyster and used her married name instead of her maiden name on purpose. Another name that she went by on legal documents was "Juffrow Molenaer". When her husband, Jan Miense Molenaer, died, the inventory of paintings in their home were not listed by the name of Judith Leyster but instead by the name of: "Juffrow Molenaer", 'His wife", "Wife of the deceased", and "Judith Molenaer". In 1903 it was documented that the British dealer and auction house Sir George Donaldson, exhibited The Last Drop and Leyster's Merry Trio together. The Last Drop and the Merry Trio were then exhibited together in the 1904 Guildhall exhibition, Painters of the Dutch School, where they were listed under both Judith Leyster and Frans Hals. The Last Drop and Merry Trio may be pendants as they were then reported to have the same measurements. At this time, Cornelis Hofstede de Groot recognized Leyster's signature on the Carousing Couple, which had previously been credited to Frans Hals. After recognizing Leyster's signature on the Carousing Couple, Groot then identified six more of Judith Leyster's paintings. The Guildhall exhibit presented a biography for Frans Hals, but not for Judith Leyster. The organizers of the exhibit did not want to surrender Frans Hals's label. It is often mistaken that Leyster was a pupil of Frans Hals, although there is no sufficient proof that this was the case. There is a slight resemblance between Leyster's work and Frans Hals's artistic style, but this is not enough to prove that she was his student. In 1904, organizers of that same Guildhall exhibition also attributed the painting Young Women at Her Toilet to the name of Leyster, but wrote about Leyster's art in a negative way.

=== Restoration ===
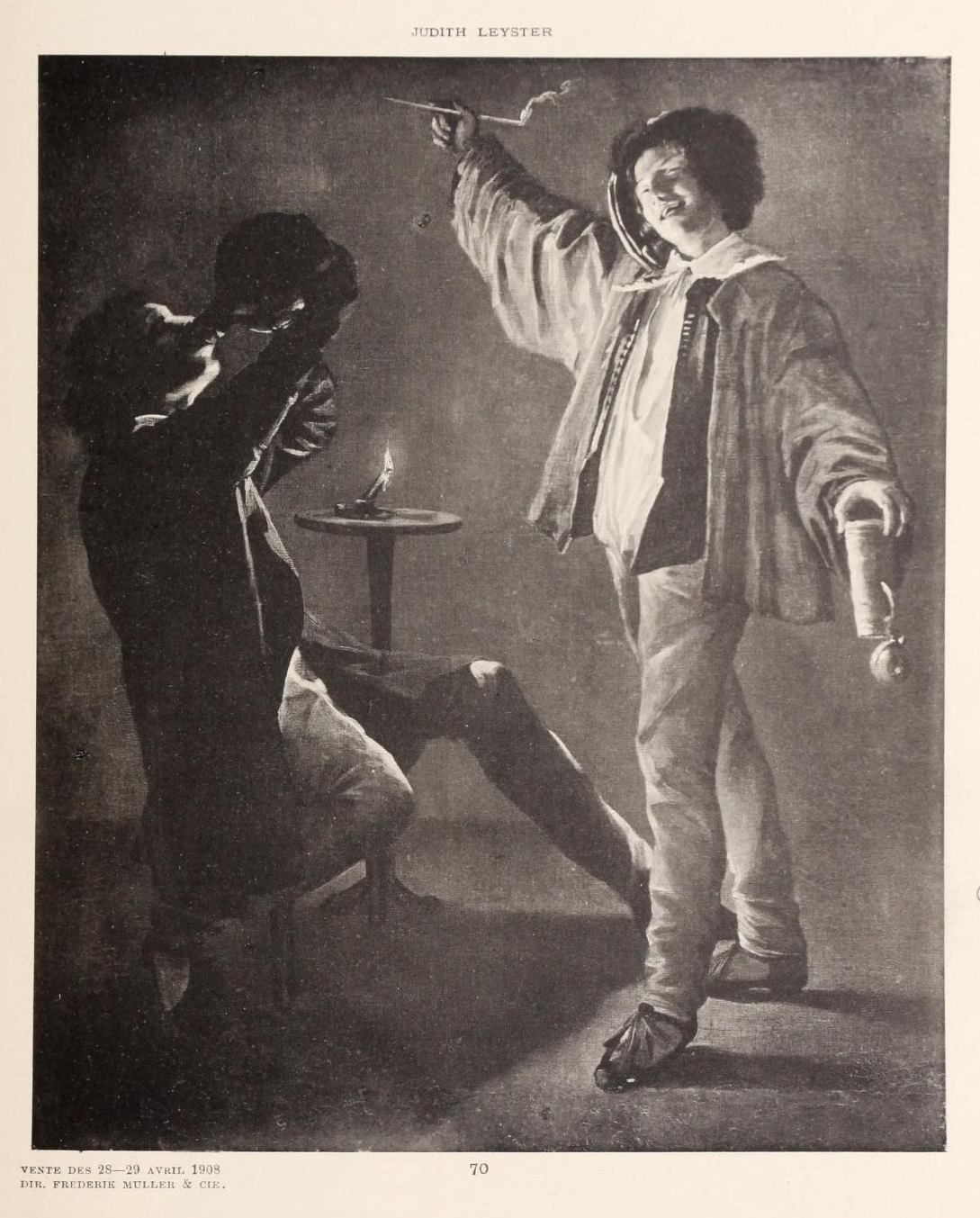
1908 sale catalog photo from the Frederik Muller & Co. auction shows the older status with overpainted skeleton

Juliane Harms documented The Last Drop in 1908. At that time, the moralizing figure of the skeleton had been painted out and a lamp stood in its place. The skeleton of The Last Drop was only known because of a studio copy. In the 1990s, the canvas was put under the examination of raking light and X-ray photography. The painting has since been restored, removing the painted lamp and revealing the skeleton. The now unconcealed skeleton demonstrates that later generations were not beholden to the image of death in the middle of the painting. This moral representation was despised enough for someone to commit the act of overpainting the skeleton.

== Interpretation ==
In reference to the skeleton and the party scene in The Last Drop, one underlying meaning for this art piece focuses on the loss of self-respect and dissipated state of drunkenness. Both men appear to be unconcerned about the actions they are committing as the skeleton is in their presence. The skeleton's facial expression and stance show that it is enjoying itself just as much as the drunken men. Skeletons were familiar figures in seventeenth-century art, representing the unavoidable nature of death. The figures of the two men appear to be similar to the figures in the scene of the Merry Trio, also painted by Judith Leyster in 1629. The Merry Trio and The Last Drop accompany each other representing night and day. Merry Trio illustrates the first stage of drinking, typically in the evening as the sun is setting. The Last Drop is the later stage of the party after drinking has continued; it is now dark and then men are blinded by the effects of drink. The night scene is represented by the use of the candle between the men and the skeleton. At this point in the night, both men are very drunk and unaware of the skeleton among them.

=== Frima Fox Hofrichter ===
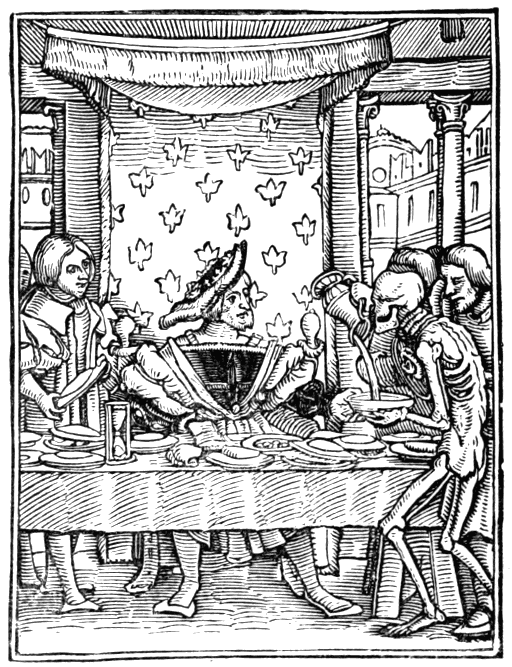
King from Hans Holbein the Younger's Dance of Death

According to Hofrichter, the scene shows a common vanitas theme with an inverted tankard and a smoking pipe to show that the party is over. The skeleton holds up an hourglass to emphasize that time is running out on the party, but also on the lives of those present. This is similar to Hans Holbein's Dance of Death series, which also shows a skeleton hanging around those who are intoxicated and giving an individual more to drink. This seems to be the original meaning of the painting before the table was painted over the skeleton. Judith Leyster used a candle to light up the activities that were taking place and establish the nighttime setting. In contrast, the daylight scene of The Merry Trio serves to show that true gaiety can be found in moderation. When Hofrichter offered this interpretation of The Last Drop, she only knew of the concealed skeleton from x-ray images.

=== Recent interpretation ===
In the Philadelphia Museum of Art online catalog for The Last Drop, the artwork is described as a scene of vastenavond (Shrove Tuesday), an annual celebration honored by Christian denominations in the seventh week before Eastern Orthodox Easter on the day before Ash Wednesday. The catalog explains The Last Drop as a representation of young men bingeing on alcohol before the fasting and restraining of the consumption of alcohol of Lent, based on the actions the individuals are performing and the items they are holding. The skeleton is a representation of the consequences of their overindulgence. The figure of death holds both a skull and an hourglass in front of the men, yet they are unaware due to their mental state.

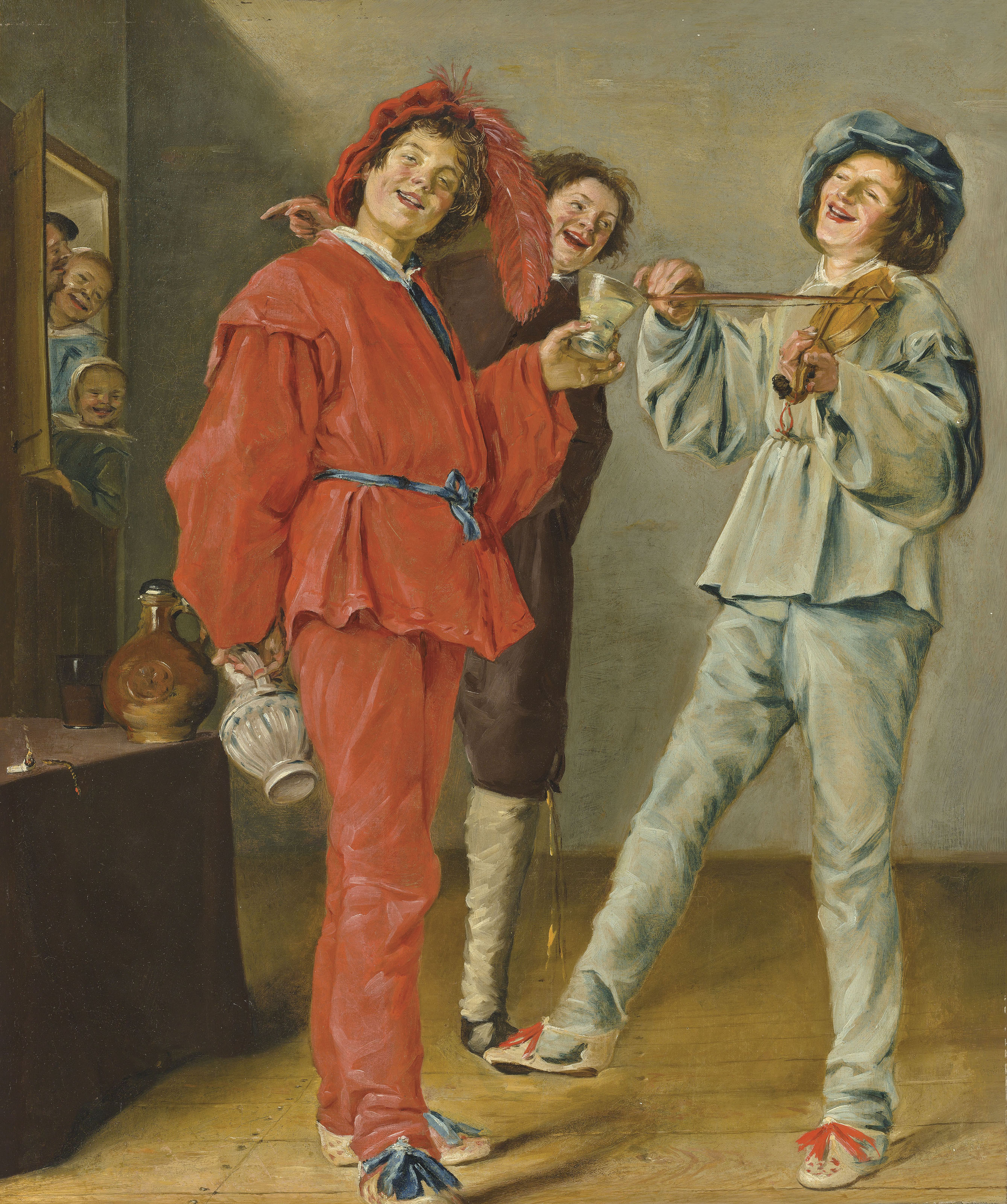

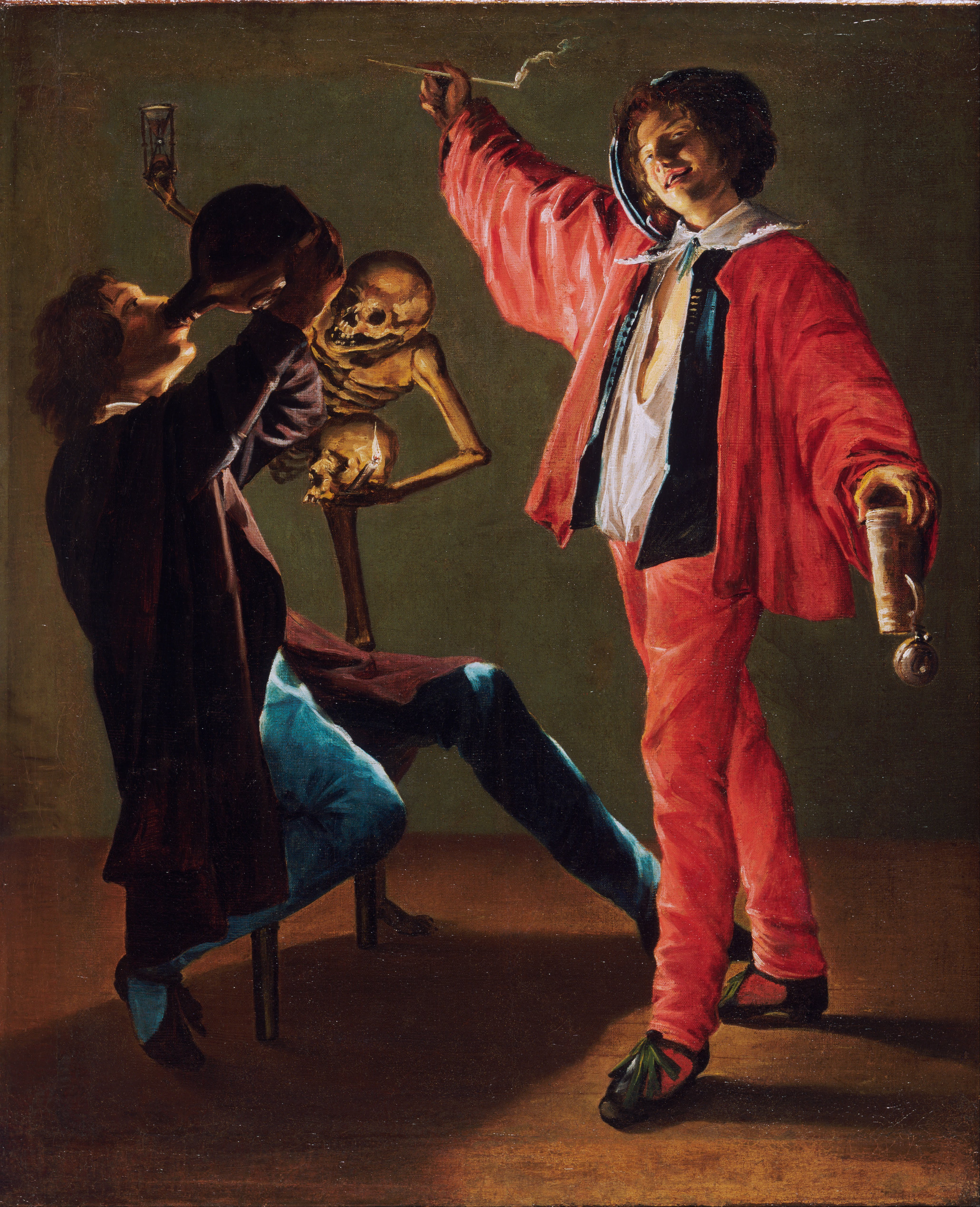

== See also ==
- List of paintings by Judith Leyster
