= Unequal Love =

Painting by Judith Leyster

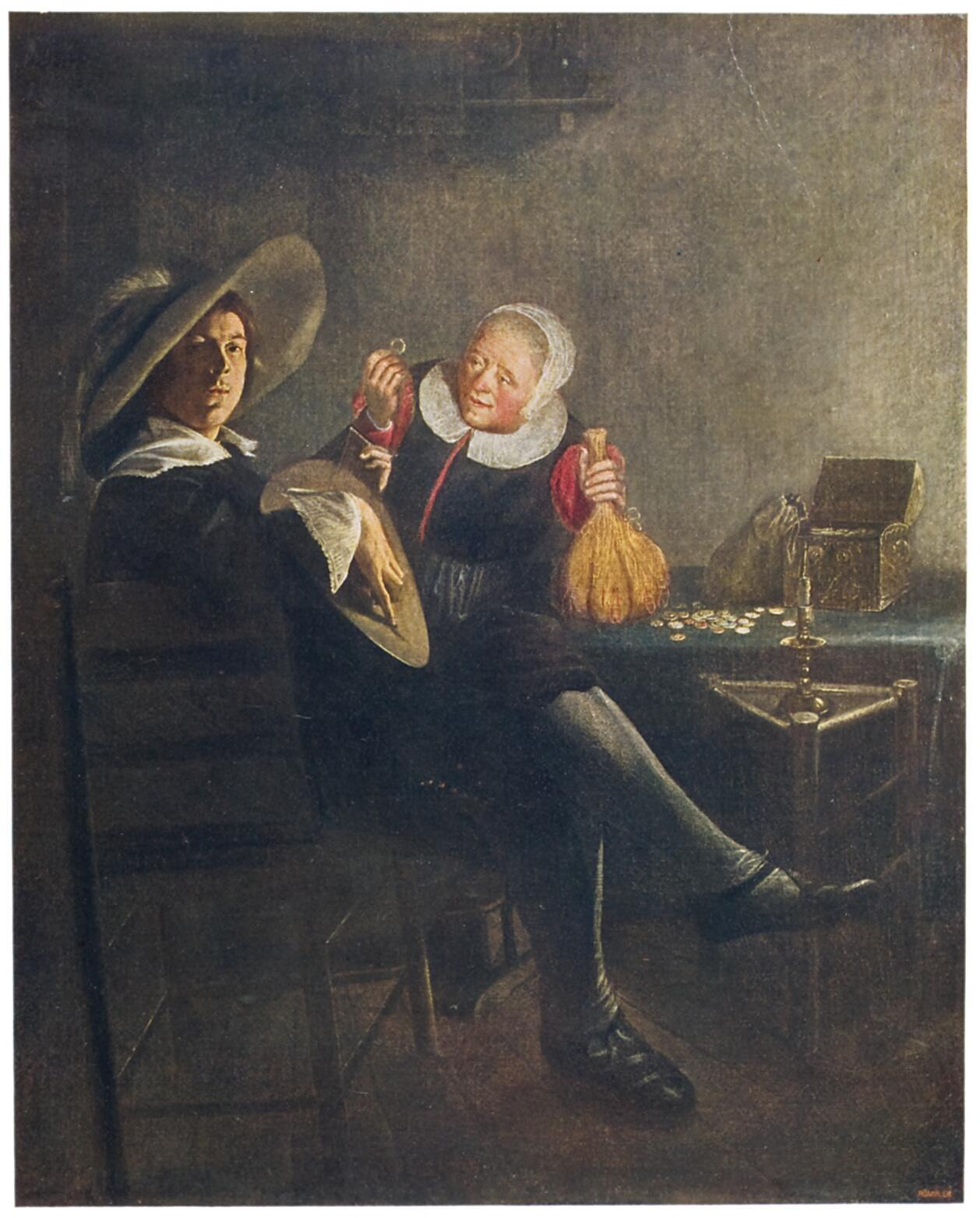
- Year: 1631
- Medium: oil paint, canvas
- Dimensions: 82 cm (32 in) × 66.5 cm (26.2 in)

Unequal Love is a painting made in about 1631 by the Dutch Golden Age painter Judith Leyster. It is in the collection of the Galleria Nazionale d'Arte Antica, Rome.

The painting shows the theme of the ill-matched couple, a popular theme in the arts of the period, though generally the one making the proposition is a man to a courtesan, not a woman to a man. The theme generally shows the man offering the woman a ring in combination with a purse of money. Earlier examples of Haarlem versions of this that were based on earlier Flemish examples are:

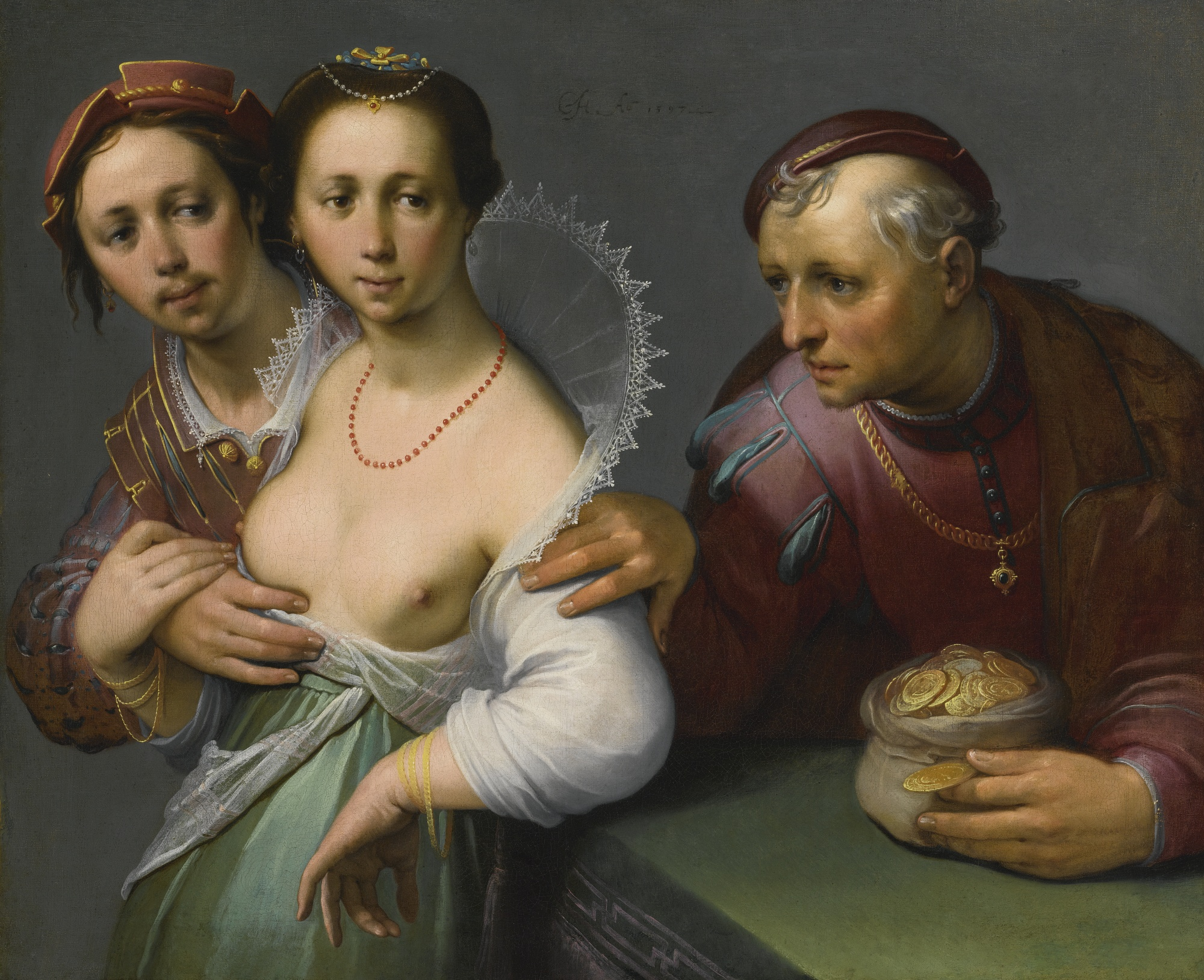
Cornelis van Haarlem, 1597

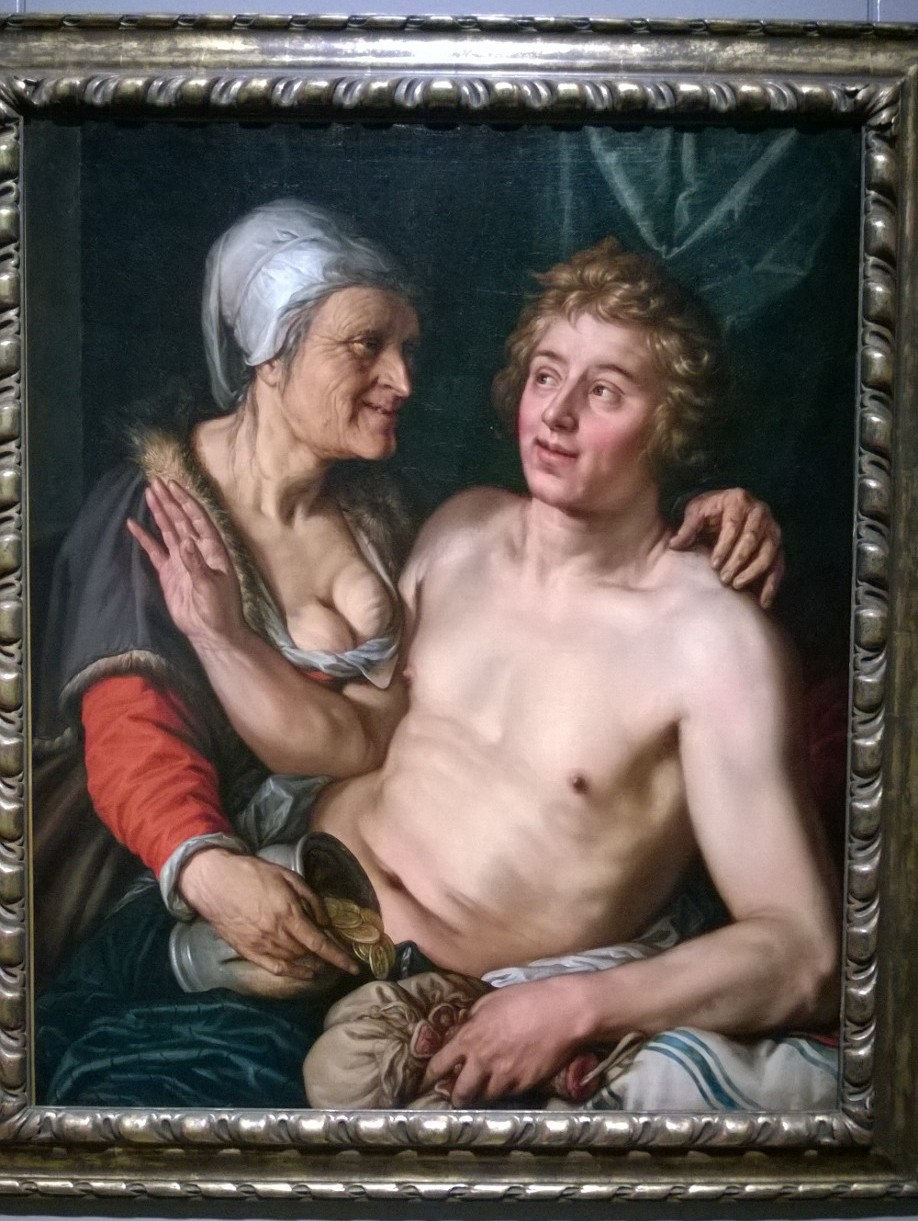
Hendrick Goltzius, 1614

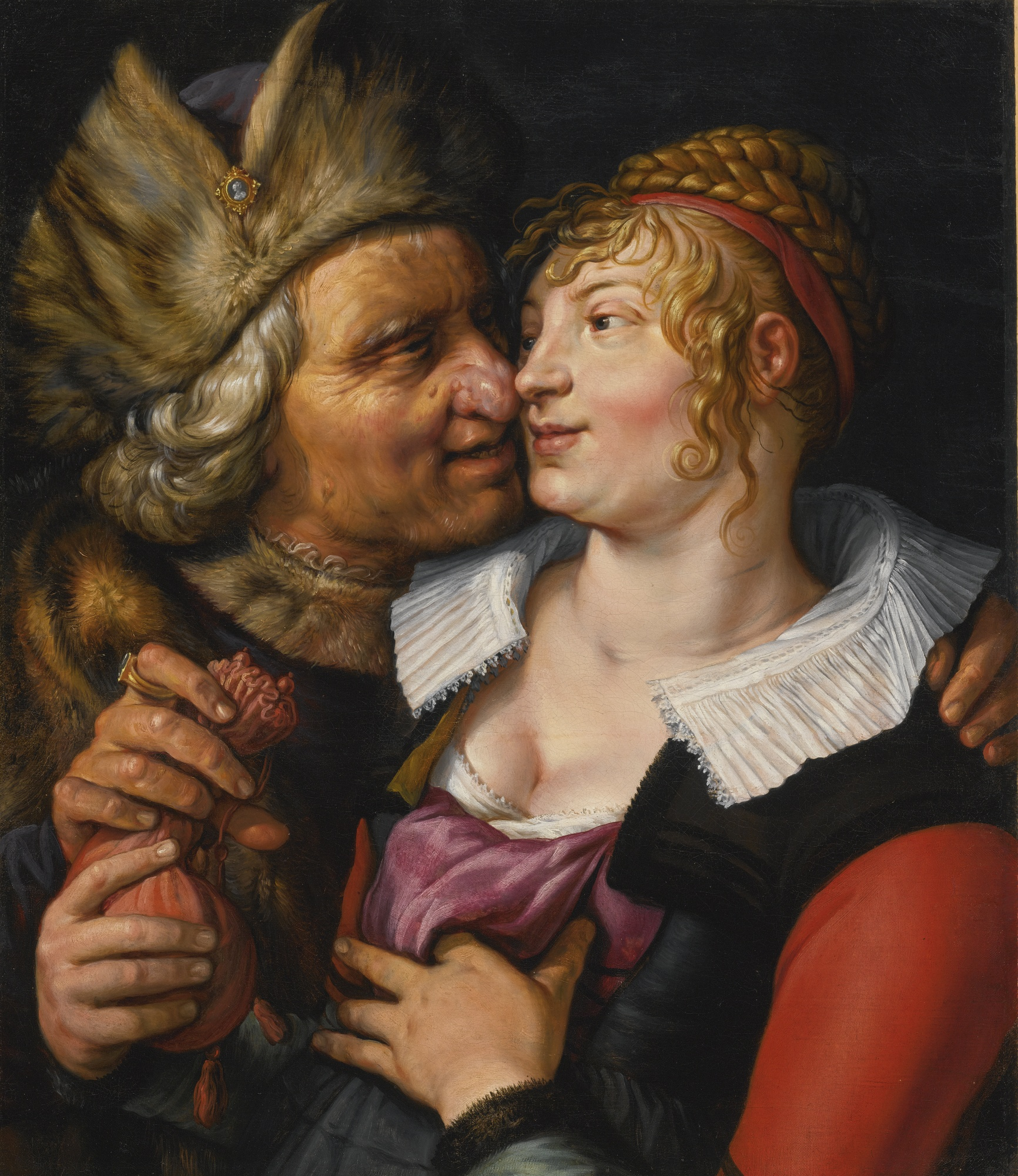
Hendrick Goltzius, c. 1615

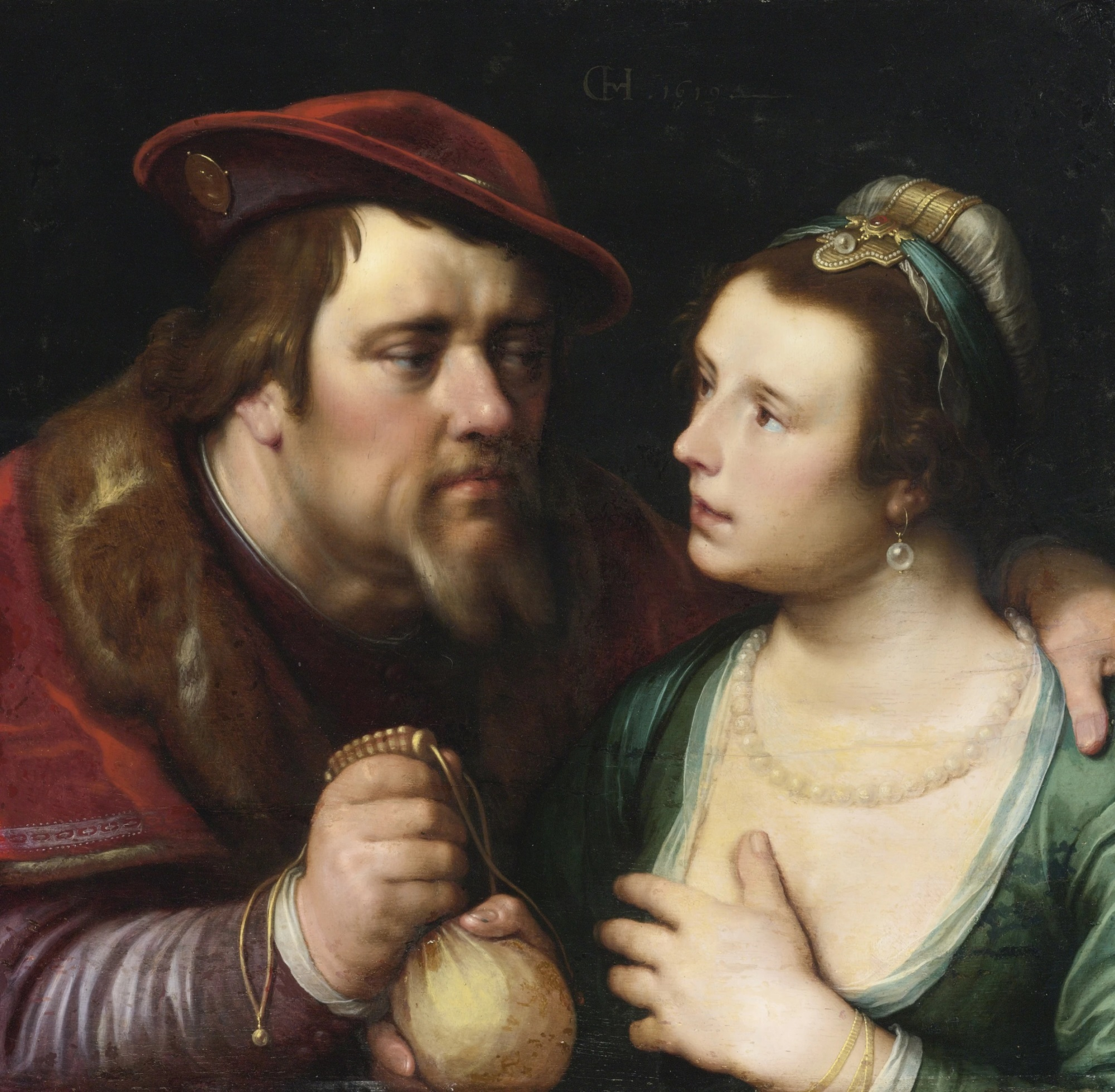
Cornelis van Haarlem, 1619

This painting certainly fits in that tradition, unlike Leyster's much more ambiguous The Proposition, also dated the same year. Here a man is sitting sideways on a simple wooden chair with his legs crossed playing the lute. He turns his head to the spectator. Behind him an older woman grasps a money purse with one hand and offers the musician a ring with the other. Both are dressed in simple peasant clothing, but there is a second purse on the table, and gold coins are spread out for counting from a money box gleaming with metal decorations that seem to contradict the simple characters in the scene. On a small three-legged stool rests a candlestick, but there is no candle in it. It lines up with a pile of coins as if to imply that instead of the "fire of love" there is money to be had for the taking.

The pose of the man leaning over the back of a chair is a common pose used by Leyster's master Frans Hals, and the crossed legs of the musician can be seen in the work of Leyster's future husband Jan Miense Molenaer. Perhaps the lute was his or hers as it features in works by both of them.

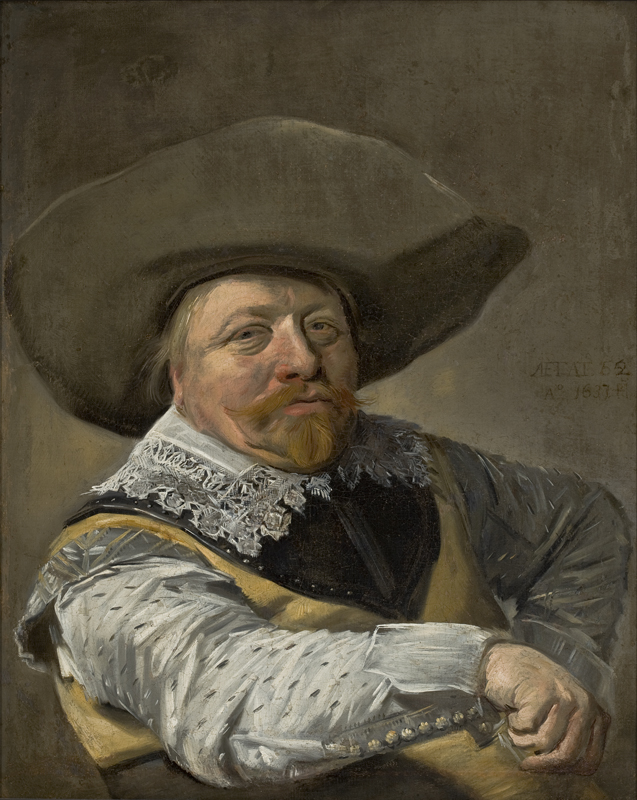
Man leaning over the back of a chair, 1631, by Hals

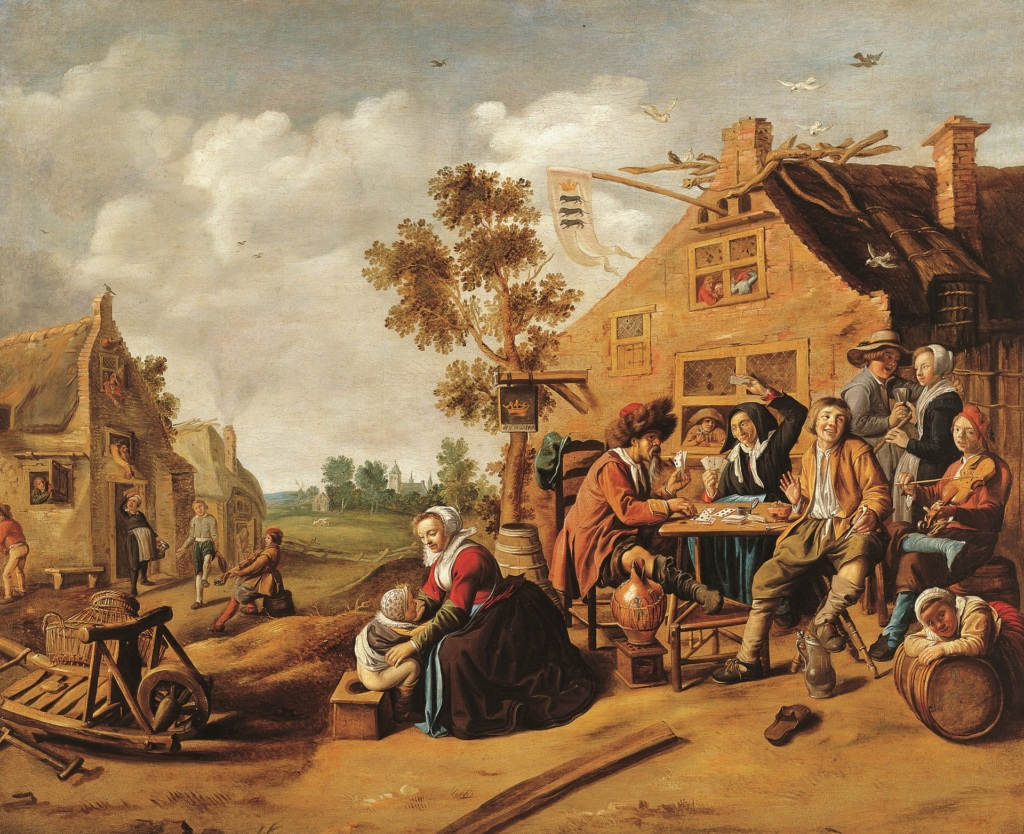
Party at the inn called 'De Kroon', 1630, by Molenaer

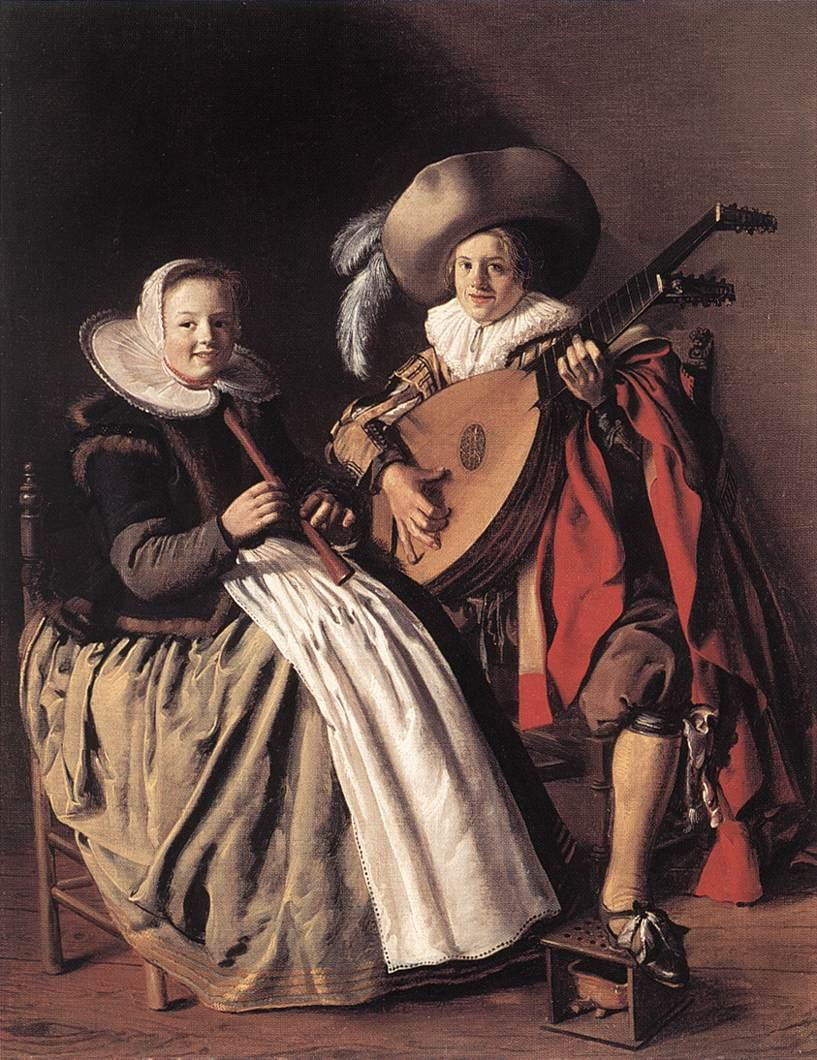
The Duet, 1630, Molenaer

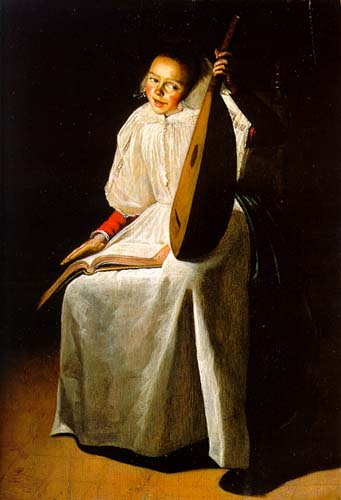
A young woman with a lute, 1631, Leyster

== Former title The Luteplayer ==
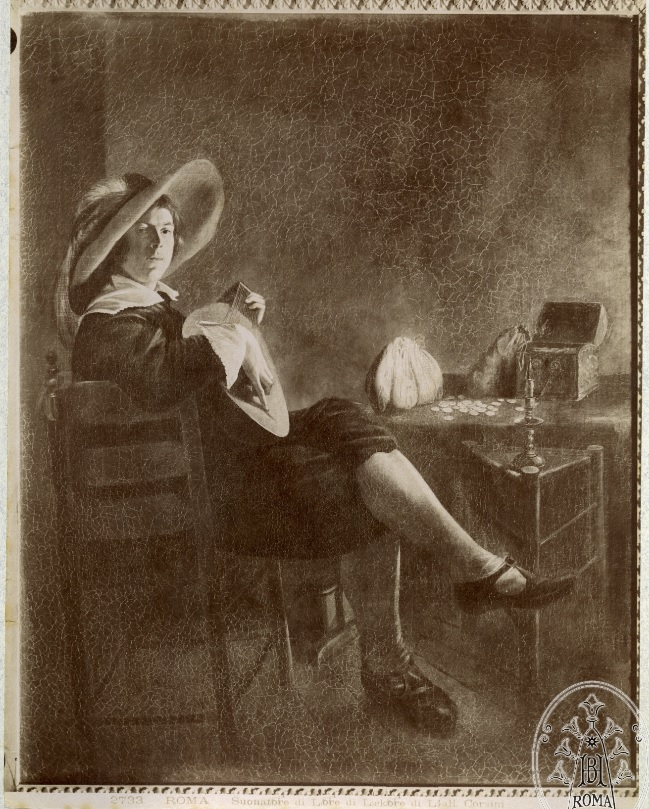
Lautenspieler, photo circa 1944, Bildindex

The painting was catalogued by Juliane Harms in 1937 as Lautenspieler (luteplayer). She classified it as one of Leyster's "intimate" portraits. The informal pose of the musician does suggest intimacy, especially considering that the female figure was not visible at all when Harms saw the picture. The woman was only resurrected during restoration after WWII. The Bildindex still has an image of the painting in its pre-restoration state.

== See also ==
- List of paintings by Judith Leyster
