= Merry Trio =

Painting by Judith Leyster

The Merry Trio
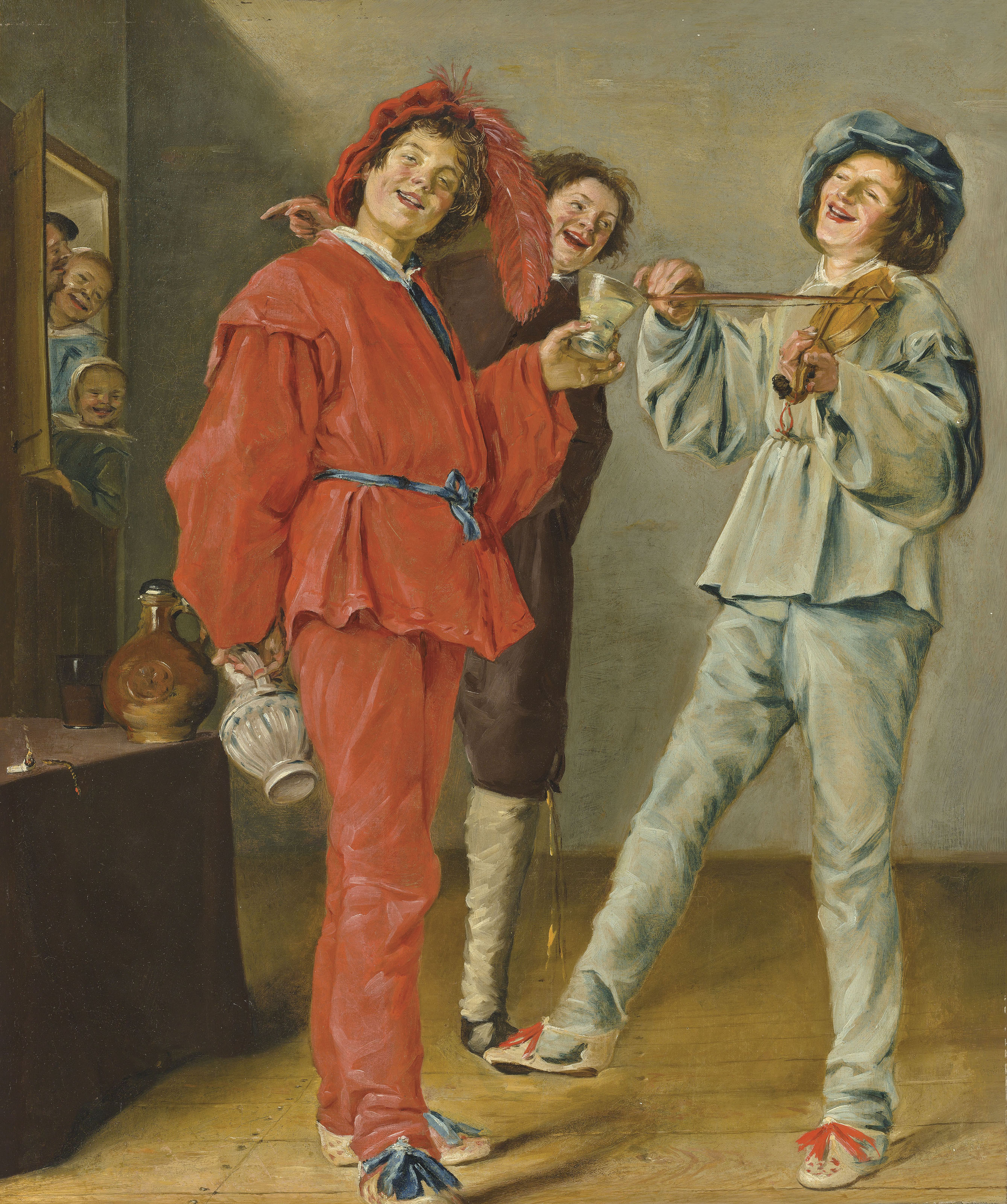
- Artist: Judith Leyster
- Year: 1629
- Medium: Oil on canvas
- Dimensions: 88 cm × 73.5 cm (35 in × 28.9 in)
- Location: private collection

The Merry Trio is an oil painting created in 1629 by the Dutch Golden Age painter Judith Leyster. It is now in a private collection. It was considered a work by Frans Hals until 1903.

== Provenance ==
The painting was together with Leyster's The Last Drop in the collection of the British dealer/auction house Sir George Donaldson (1845–1925) where it was documented in 1903. The two may be pendants, as they were then reported to have the same measurements.

According to Hofrichter, the scene shows the popular Merry company theme common in 17th-century commedia dell'arte plays. This daylight scene serves as a contrast to its candlelit pendant which warns of the dangers of drinking and smoking. Clearly, Leyster preferred the sober yet festive daytime scene, because she selected the musician on the right to illustrate her self-portrait. It was purchased in 1988 from the Noortman collection by the Dutch businessman Eric Albada Jelgersma, and was auctioned in 2018.

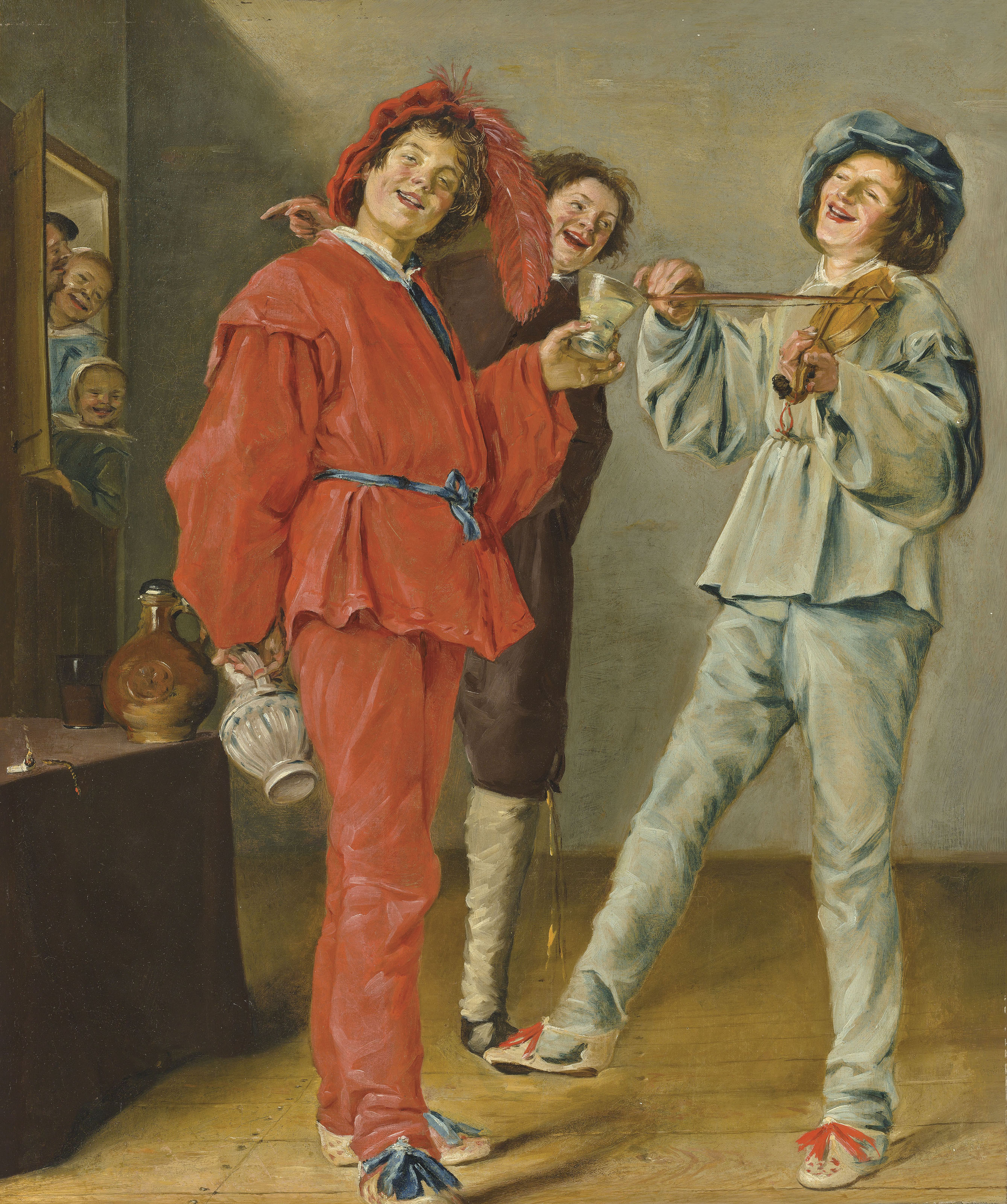

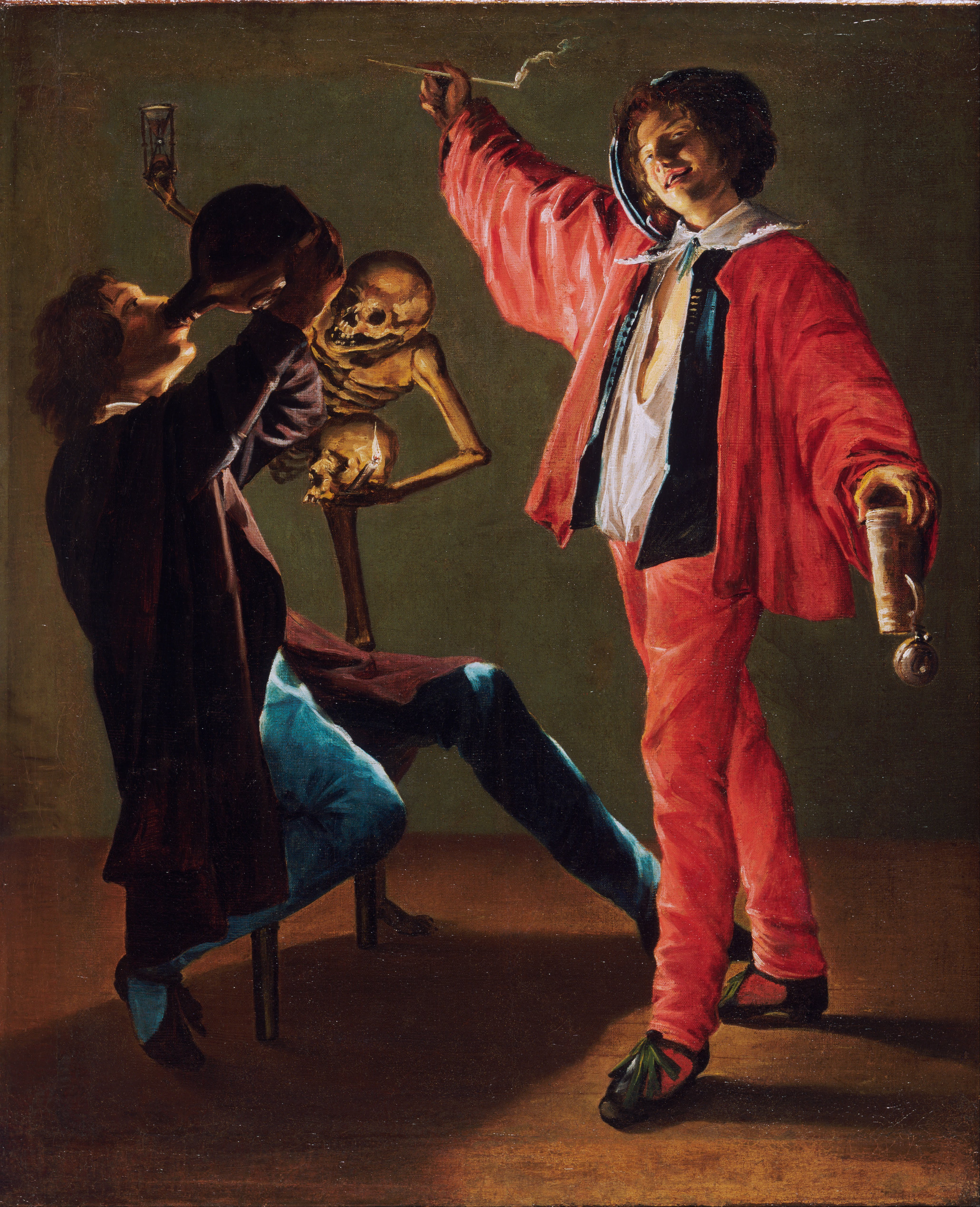
The Last Drop (c. 1629), a possible pendant

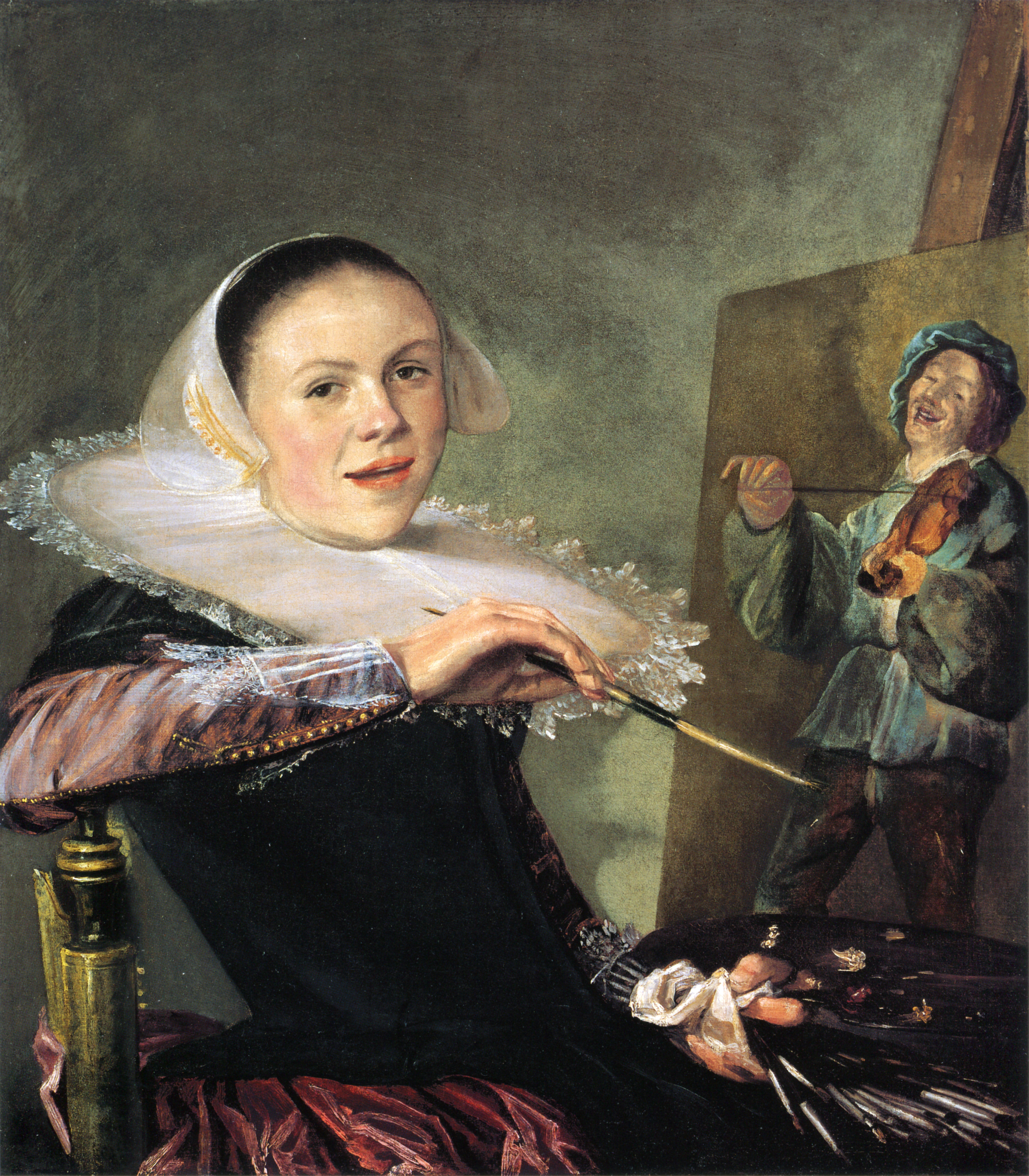
Self-portrait with easel

== See also ==
- List of paintings by Judith Leyster
