= A Youth with a Jug =

Painting by Judith Leyster

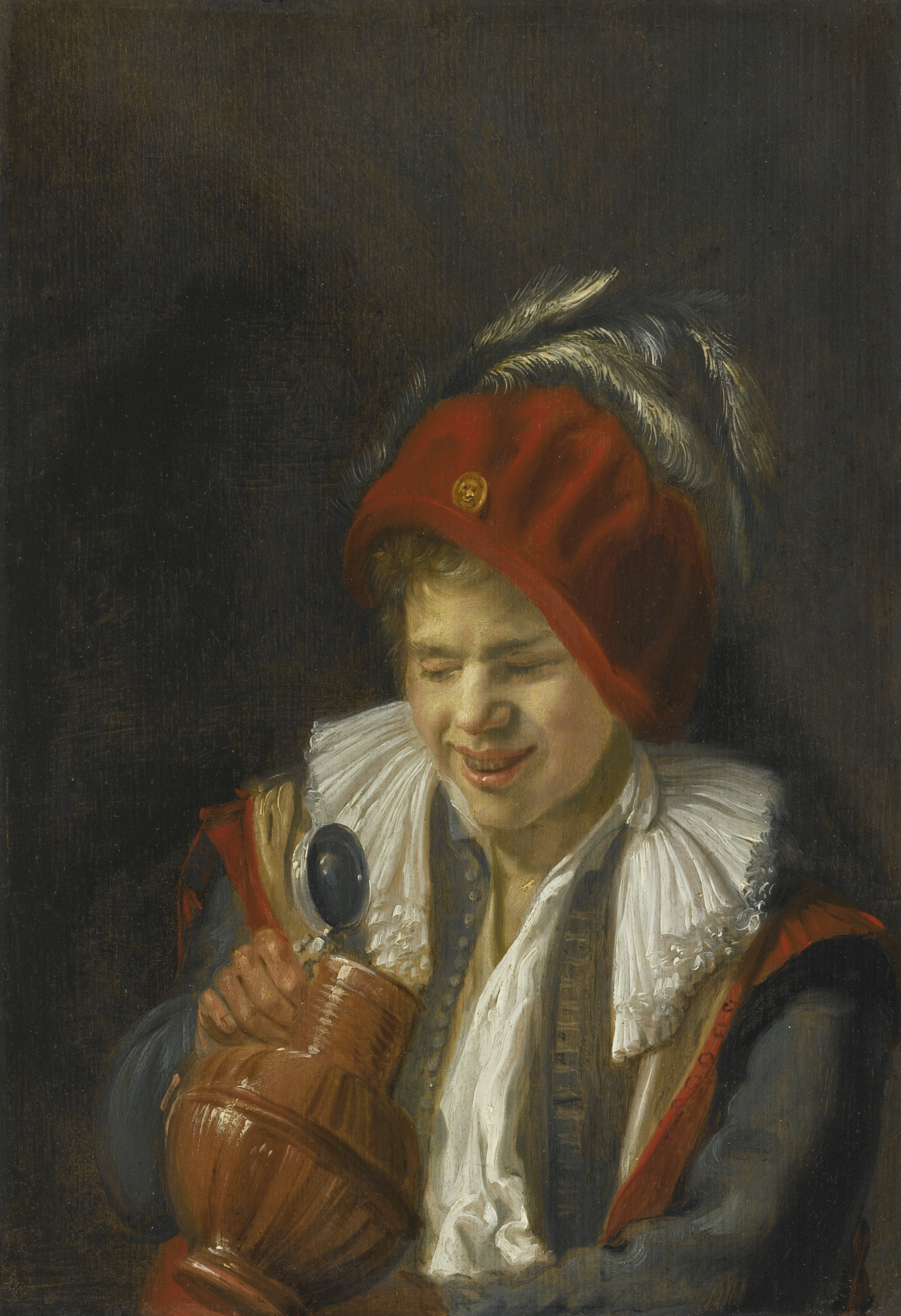
- Artist: Judith Leyster
- Year: c. 1631–1633
- Medium: Oil on panel
- Dimensions: 31 cm × 21.5 cm (12 in × 8.5 in)
- Location: Private collection

A Youth with a Jug also called Boy peering into an earthenware tankard is a c. 1631–1633 oil painting by Judith Leyster currently in a private collection.

== Provenance ==
This painting was first documented as being in the collection of Arthur Kay who published his "Treasure Trove of Art" in 1939, including this Youth with a Jug as one of a series on the five senses painted by Judith Leyster. Later the five paintings were documented as being in the collection of Paris gallery owner Georges Wildenstein, Buenos Aires by 1941. By the 1950s the paintings were split up on the art market and this one was attributed to Leyster by the researcher Frima Fox Hofrichter in 1991 when it was sold to the present owner. In 2002 three of the paintings were brought back together and attributed to Leyster's husband Jan Miense Molenaer. Since then the remaining two have come on the market, but new examination has brought doubts as to whether all five paintings were ever a set. This one remains attributed to Leyster.

== Two of the series of five ==
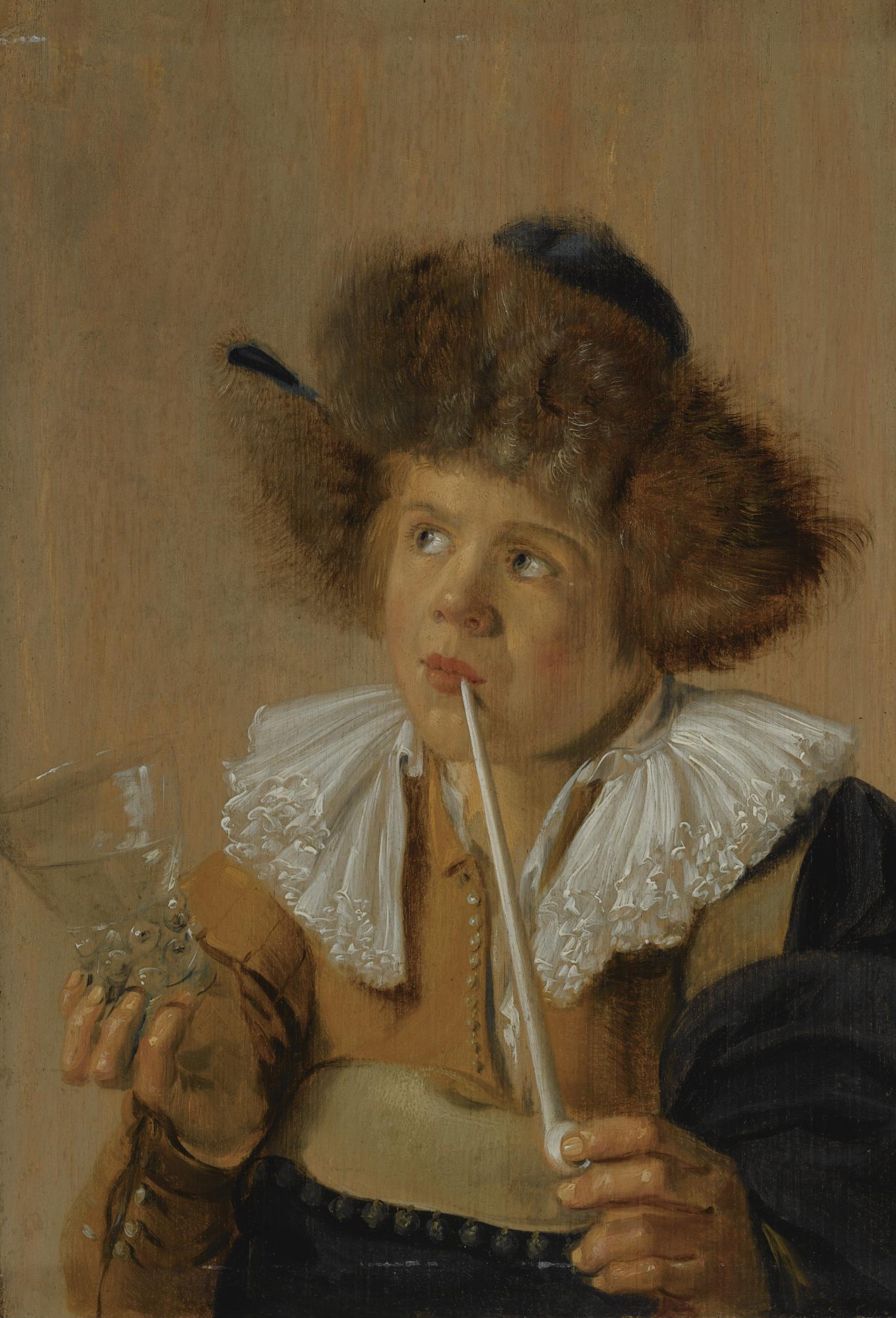

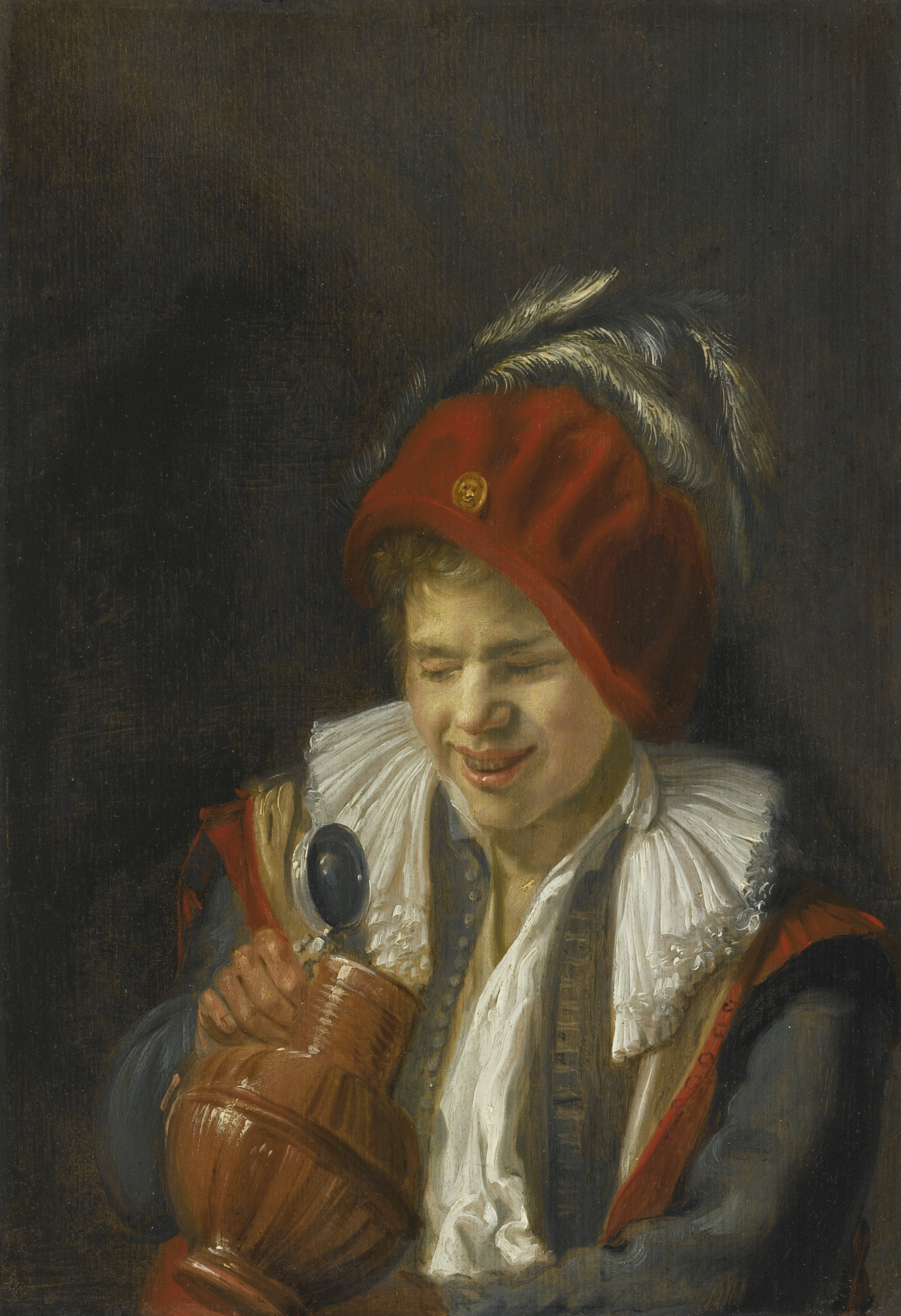

== Kannekijker ==
The painting depicts a kannekijker, one who peers wistfully into the bottom of an empty jug as if by wishing more wine will appear in it. The painting is unsigned, but the chemise of the boy is similar to that of another painting attributed to Leyster in the Bristol Art Gallery.

The painter Frans Hals also made a youthful kannekijker in his Two laughing boys with mug of beer:

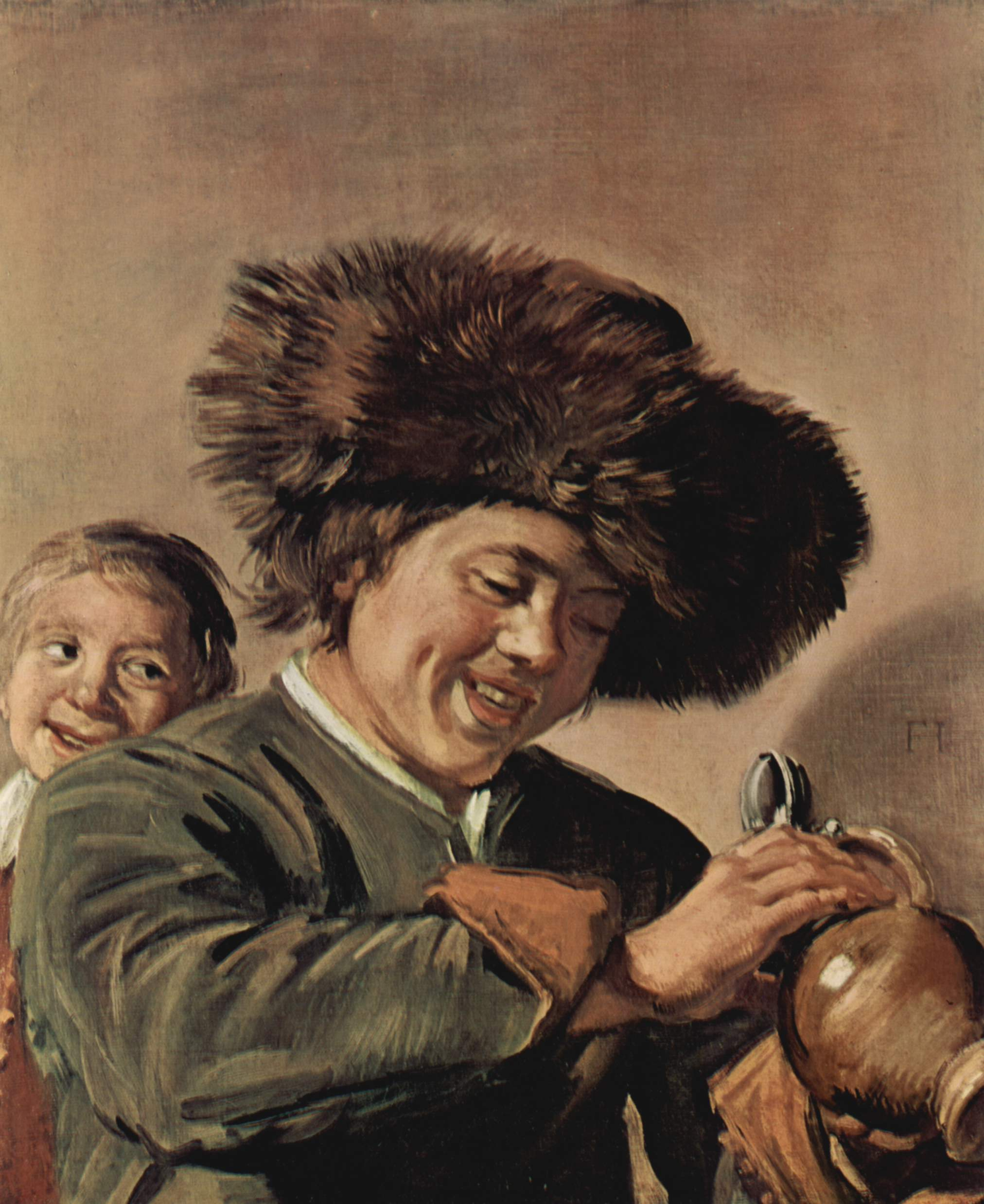

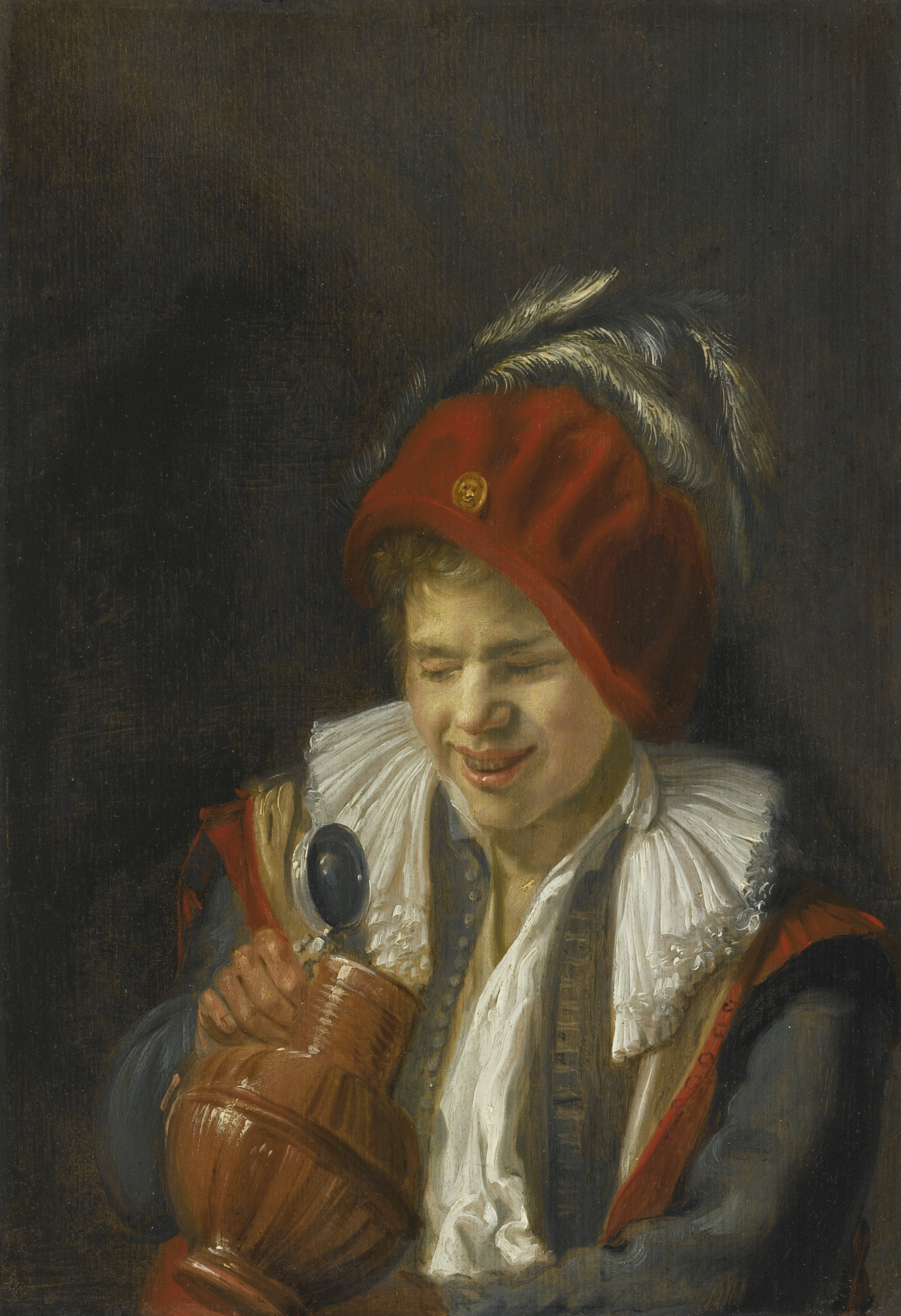

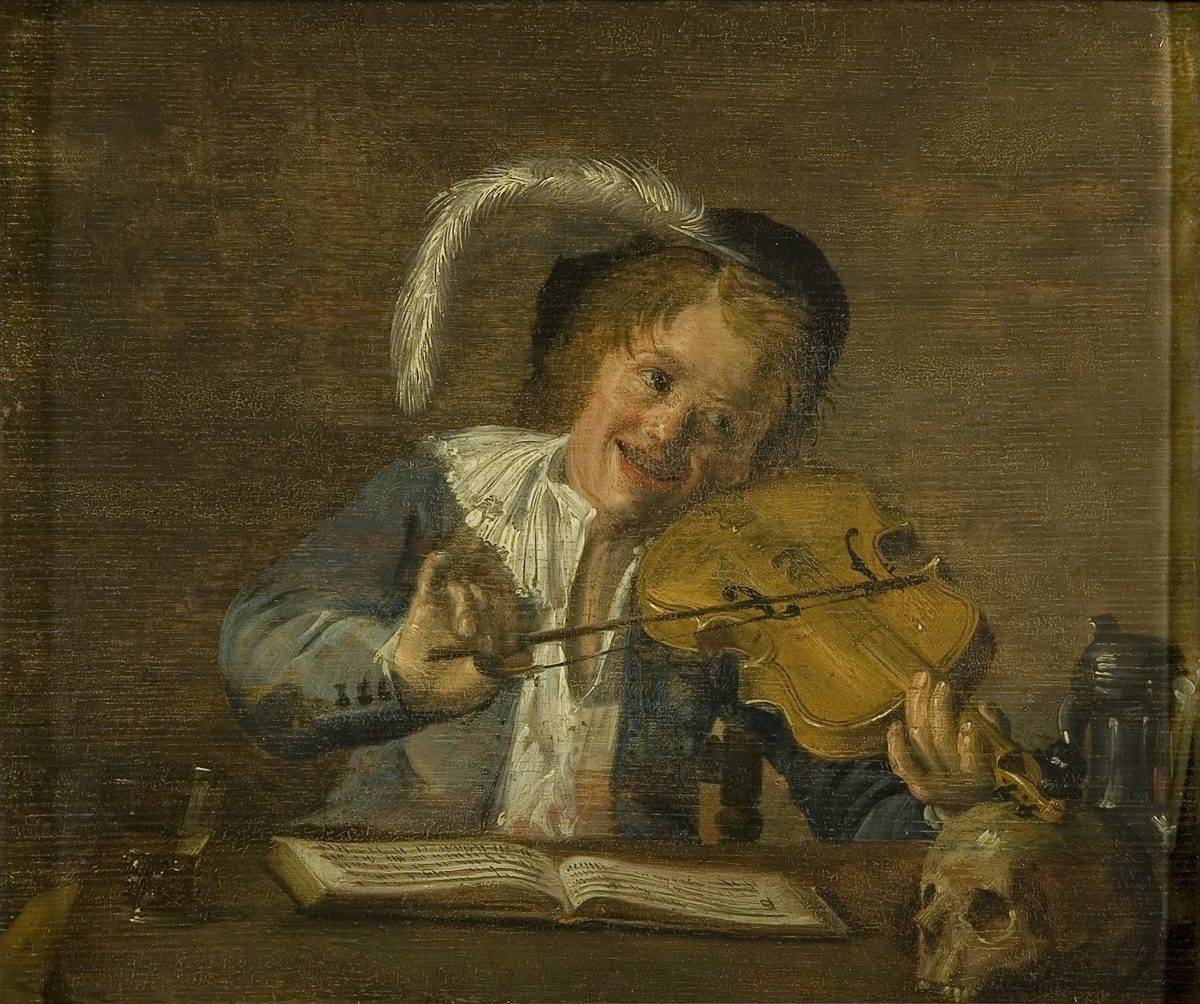

== See also ==
- List of paintings by Judith Leyster
