= List of paintings by Judith Leyster =

The following is a list of paintings by Judith Leyster that are generally accepted as autograph by the Frima Fox Hofrichter catalog and other sources.

Image	Title	Year	Size	Inventory no.	Gallery	Location
	Copy of Lute Player by Frans Hals	1628	65 cm x 58 cm	SK-A-134	Rijksmuseum	Amsterdam
	The Serenade	1629	45.5 cm x 35 cm	SK-A-2326	Rijksmuseum	Amsterdam
	Lute Player (copy of The Serenade)	1629	50 cm x 37 cm		Private collection	unknown
	Jolly Toper (Peeckelharingh)	1629	89 cm x 85 cm	SK-A-1685	Rijksmuseum	Amsterdam
	Merry Drinker (Peeckelharingh)	1629	74 cm x 52 cm	801B	Gemäldegalerie (Staatliche Museen zu Berlin)	Berlin
	Laughing Boy with Grapes in His Hat	1629	25.4 cm x 21 cm		Currier Museum of Art	Manchester, NH
	Round Portrait of a Boy in a Beret	1629	16.6 cm x 16.3 cm	NM 3384	Nationalmuseum Stockholm	Stockholm
	Merry Trio	1629	88 cm x 73.5 cm		Collection Nortman	London and Maastricht
	The Last Drop	1629	89 cm x 73.7 cm	2033	Philadelphia Museum of Art – John G. Johnson Collection	Philadelphia (Pennsylvania)
	Rommelpot Player	1630	39.1 cm x30.5 cm	47-78	Art Institute of Chicago	Chicago
	Merry Company of Three Boys with a Violin	1630	27.3 cm x 20.9 cm	1388	Nasjonalgalleriet	Oslo
	Two Children with a Cat	1630			Private collection	unknown
	Standing Cavalier (after the portrait of Willem van Heythuizen by Frans Hals)	1629–1631	62.5 cm x 42 cm		Royal Collection	unknown
	Carousing Couple	1630	68 cm x 55 cm	RF 2131	Musée du Louvre	Paris
	Girl and Boy at a Game of Kolf	1630			Private collection	unknown
	Head of a Boy in Profile	1630			National Gallery of Art	Washington D.C.
	Man Offering Money to a Young Woman	1631	30.9 cm x 24.2 cm	564	Mauritshuis	The Hague
	A Young Lady Holding a Lute with a Music Score on Her Lap in a Candlelit Interior	1631	31 cm x 22 cm		Private collection	London
	Unequal Love	1631	80 cm x 65 cm	1086	Galleria Nazionale d'Arte Antica	Rome
	A Game of Tric-Trac	1630	62.2 cm x 40.6 cm	1983.58	Worcester Art Museum	Worcester (Massachusetts)
	The Concert	1633	60.9 cm x 86.3 cm		National Museum of Women in the Arts	Washington, D.C.
	Portrait of a Man	1633			Private collection	unknown
	Self-Portrait	1633	72.3 cm x 65.3 cm	1050	National Gallery of Art	Washington D.C.
	A Youth with a Jug	1633	31 cm x 21.5 cm		Private collection	unknown
	Violinist with a Skull and a Music Book	1633	26.7 cm x 30.4 cm	K1343	Bristol Art Gallery (not on display as of December 2021)	Bristol
	David with the head of Goliath	1633	21 cm x 15 cm		Private collection	unknown
	A Game Of Cards	1633	59 cm x 35 cm	07-I-51	Musée des Beaux-Arts de Rouen	Rouen
	Boy Playing A Violin	1635	75 cm x 66 cm	49.11.32	Virginia Museum of Fine Arts	Richmond (Virginia)
	The Fingernail Test (Boy with Glass and Lute)	1635	72.1 cm x 59 cm	14.40.604	Metropolitan Museum of Art	New York City
	A Boy Reading	1635	76.3 cm x 63.4 cm		Oskar Reinhart collection	Winterthur
	Head of a Child	1630–1640	35.5 cm x 30.4 cm		Fondation Rau pour le Tiers-Monde	Zürich
	Young Flute Player	1635	73 cm x 62 cm	1120	Nationalmuseum Stockholm	Stockholm
	Portrait of a Woman in Millstone Collar and Winged Diadem Cap	1635	53.5 cm x 41.5 cm	OS-65-8	Frans Hals Museum	Haarlem
	Portrait of a Man with Beard and Ruff Collar	1635	68.5 cm x 56.5 cm		Private collection	unknown
	The Lute Player (Facing Left)	1635	82.8 cm x 75 cm		Sir Alfred Beit collection	Blessington
	Still Life with Apples and Grapes in a Wicker Basket on a Table	1635-1640	68 cm x 62.5 cm		Mrs. Barbara Johnson collection	Princeton, NJ
	A Boy and a Girl with a Cat and an Eel	1640	59.4 cm x 48.8 cm	5417	National Gallery	London
	Early Brabantian Tulip (tulip book, 1643)	1643	38.2 cm x 27.2 cm		Frans Hals Museum	Haarlem
	Flower Piece	1654	69.7 cm × 50.4 cm		Private collection	unknown

== Sources ==
- Judith Leyster: A Woman Painter in Holland's Golden Age, by Frima Fox Hofrichter, Doornspijk, 1989, Davaco Publishers, ISBN 90-70288-62-1
- Judith Leyster paintings in the RKD
