= A Boy and a Girl with a Cat and an Eel =

Painting by Judith Leyster

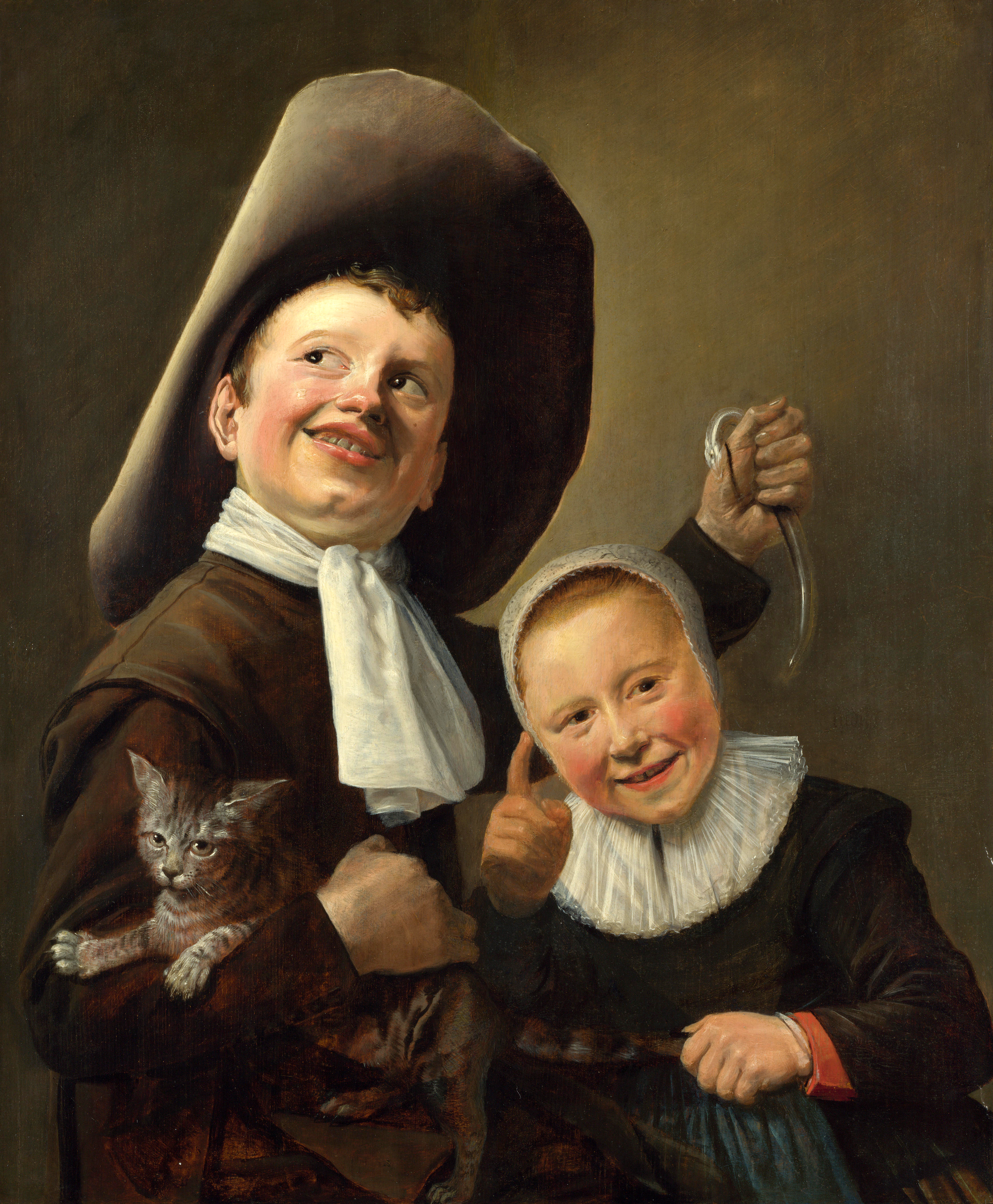
- Artist: Judith Leyster
- Year: about 1635
- Medium: Oil on canvas
- Dimensions: 60 cm × 49 cm (24 in × 19 in)
- Location: National Gallery; London

A Boy and a Girl with a Cat and an Eel is a 1635 oil painting by Judith Leyster that is now in the National Gallery, London.

== Academic interpretation ==
There have been various interpretations of Judith Leyster's A Boy and a Girl with a Cat and an Eel by different scholars. Some, such as Neil McLaren, have argued that it represents the Dutch proverb "Een aal bij de staart hebben" (or "to hold an eel by the tail") meaning that you do not get to hold onto something just because you have it. This moralistic interpretation is supported, Cynthia Kortenhorst-Von Bogendorff Rupprath says, by the eye contact with the viewer made by the little girl in the painting as she wags her finger. Other interpretations include allusions to other Dutch proverbs as well as the popular pastime in seventeenth-century Dutch festivals or funfairs (kermissen) of katknuppelen, the bludgeoning of cats. The depiction of children torturing or being scratched by cats was a popular one at this time in the Netherlands, and may allude to the Dutch proverbs "Hij doet kattekwaad", which translates literally to "he does the mischief of the cat", or "'t Liep uit op katjesspel", the literal translation of which is "it ends in the game of the cat", which relate to mischievous or arguing children.

Leyster's husband, Jan Miense Molenaer, included such an image in his group portrait "The Ruychaver-van der Laen Family" (c. 1629–30) in which a boy holding a clawing cat by the tail torments a girl by dangling it near her; she shies away tending to her scratched hand. These roles are reversed in Leyster's painting where it is the girl pulling the cat's tail, tragedy has not yet struck, and the girl's eye contact and shaking finger leave it perhaps up to the viewer to interpret what result her actions will have. Some scholars have also interpreted the eel being held as a kat aal or cat-eel, which were fed to cats as they were not worth eating. In this case it would be the boy who had enticed the cat into his grasp and he would be getting what was coming to him. Yet another interpretation is that the girl is waving her finger to make the viewers feel that she is reprimanding her brother for teasing the cat, and she is thereby distracting their attention from her own misbehaviour, which is pulling the cat's tail, making it nervous, and about to scratch. There are other examples of Dutch paintings as well as poems, such as Jacob Cats in his introductory section of his book Kinderspel or Children's Games, which use children as a motif both to mock and to preach morals to adults, and Frima Fox Hofrichter says this painting falls into that category.

== See also ==
- List of paintings by Judith Leyster
