= Serenade (Leyster) =

1629 painting by Judith Leyster

The Serenade
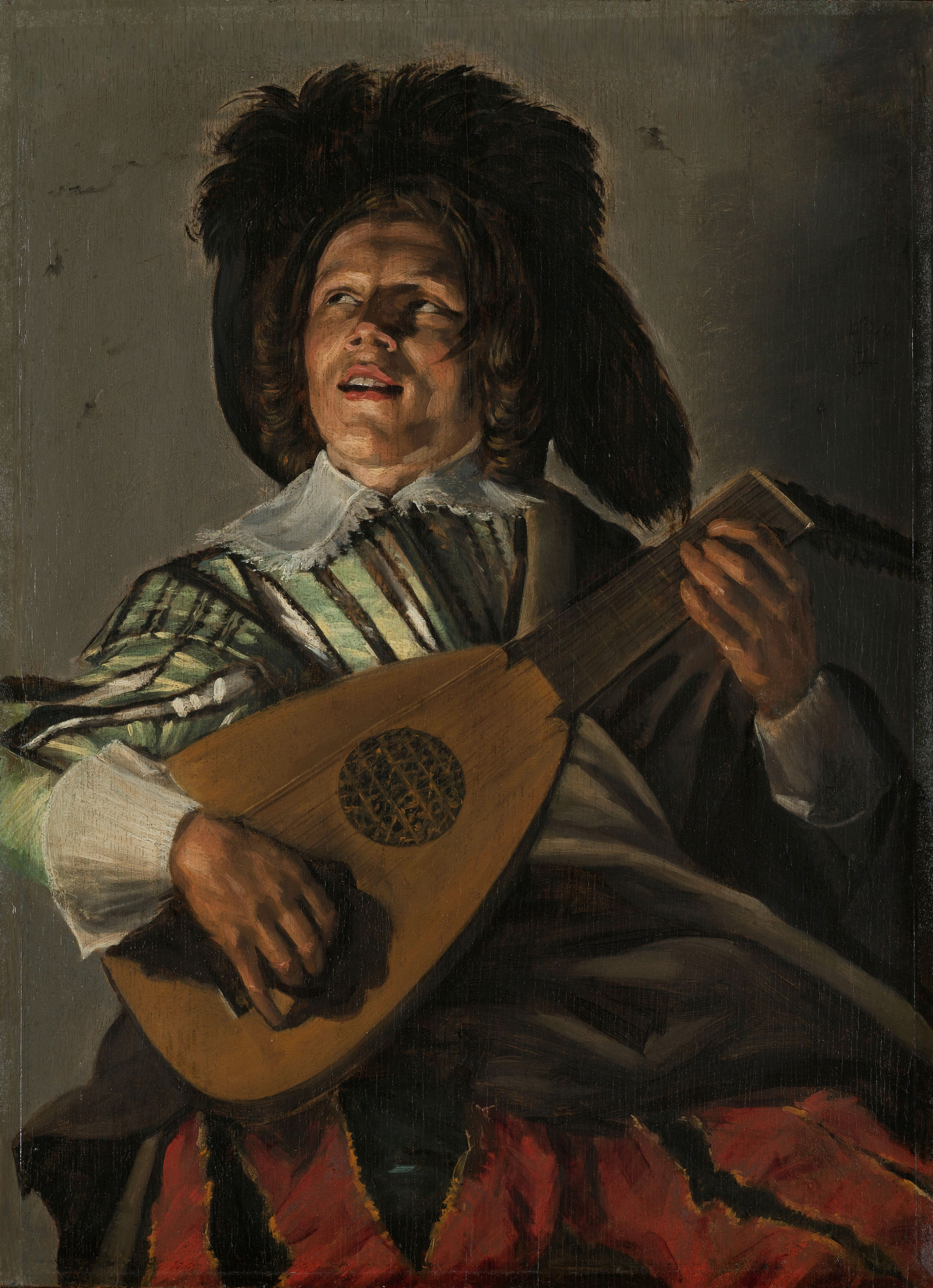
- Artist: Judith Leyster
- Year: 1629
- Medium: oil paint, panel
- Dimensions: 47 cm (19 in) × 34.5 cm (13.6 in)
- Location: Rijksmuseum, Netherlands
- Accession: SK-A-2326

The Serenade is a 1629 oil painting by Judith Leyster in the collection of the Rijksmuseum. It was attributed for centuries to Frans Hals until Wilhelm von Bode saw it in the Six collection in 1883. He noticed the prominent "J" in the signature, and attributed it to Jan Hals. This is one of seven paintings first properly attributed to Leyster by Hofstede de Groot ten years later in 1893.

== Provenance ==
Originally in the collection of the Amsterdam art collector Pieter van Winter (1745–1807), the painting came into the Six collection through his daughter's marriage to Hendrik Six van Hillegom. A mezzotint of this painting was made for Van Winter in 1803 by Frederik Christiaan Bierweiler and inscribed "F. Hals pinxit ... F.C. Bierweiler fecit 1803".

After it was attributed to Leyster, the Rijksmuseum purchased the paintings from the Six heirs of Jhr. P.H. Six van Vromade together with 38 other paintings with support from the Vereniging Rembrandt in 1908. The painting is signed and dated "1629 / J*".

According to Hofrichter, the scene shows a lute player in the "Honthorst style" of indirect candle light from below. The musician is looking upward and to the left in another characteristic Leyster pose.

== Exhibitions ==
- Satire en vermaak. Het genrestuk van Frans Hals en zijn tijdgenoten, 1610–1635, Frans Hals Museum, Haarlem, 20 September 2003 – 4 January 2004, ISBN 90-400-8855-1.
- Judith Leyster, 1609-1660, National Gallery of Art, Washington D.C., 21 June – 29 November 2009, OCLC 526629623.
- Judith Leyster. De eerste vrouw die meesterschilder werd, Frans Hals Museum, Haarlem, 19 December 2009 – 9 May 2010, ISBN 9789490198039.
- The Golden Age of Dutch Painting. Masterpieces from the Rijksmuseum Amsterdam, Museum of Islamic Art, Doha, 11 March – 6 June 2011.

== See also ==
- List of paintings by Judith Leyster
