= The Proposition (Leyster) =

1631 painting by Judith Leyster

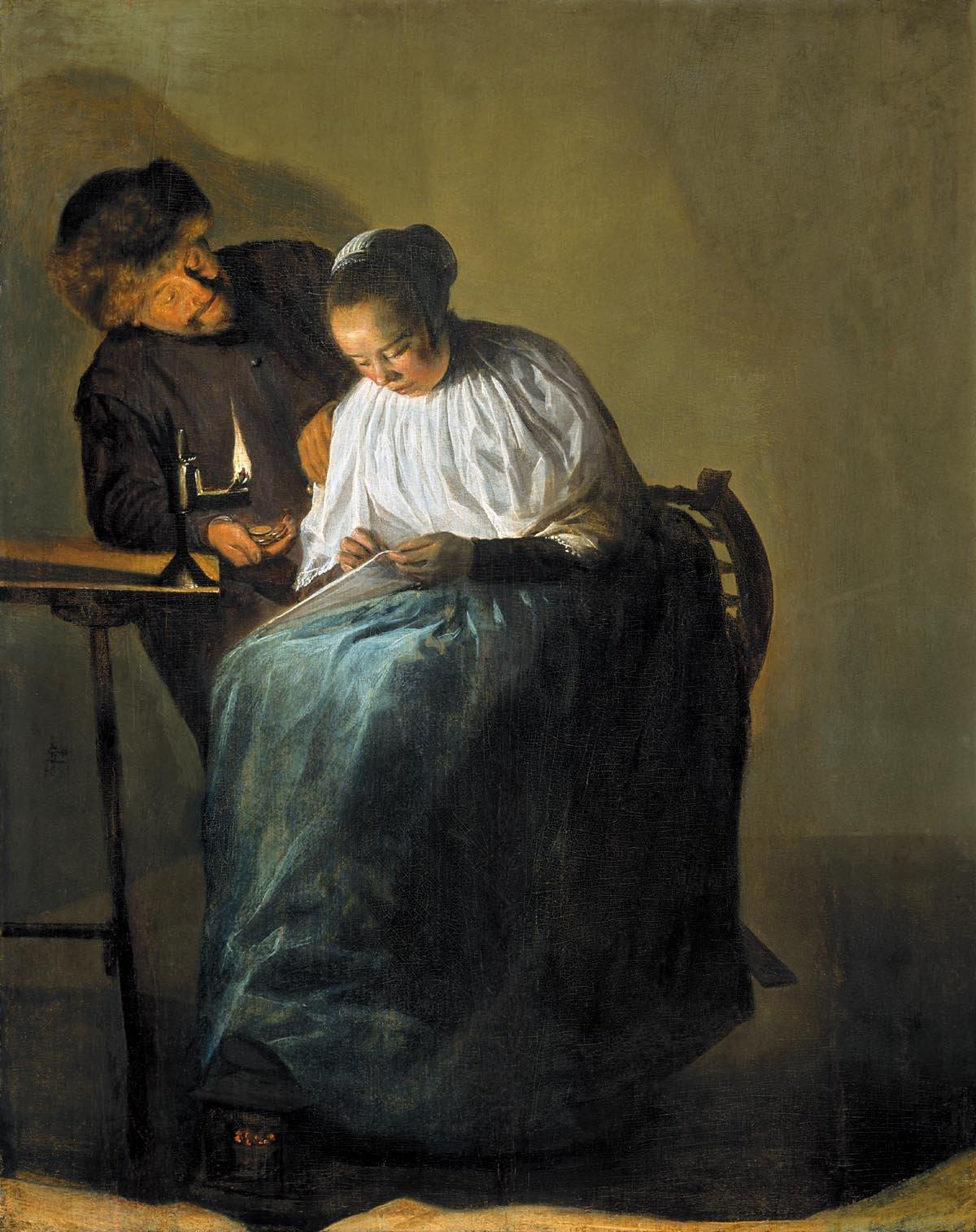
- Artist: Judith Leyster
- Year: 1631
- Medium: Oil on panel
- Dimensions: 31 cm × 24 cm (11 3/8 in × 9.5 in)
- Location: Royal Picture Gallery, Mauritshuis, The Hague

The Proposition is a genre painting of 1631 by Judith Leyster. It is held in The Hague by the Mauritshuis, which titled it Man offering money to a young woman. It depicts a woman, sewing by candlelight, as a man leans over her, touching her right shoulder with his left hand. He is offering her coins in his right hand, but she is apparently ignoring the offer and concentrating intently upon her sewing. As we see the female protagonist (seemingly) ignore the advances of her suitor, this painting has been considered to potentially be a feminist work.

The man wears dark clothing, and the dark tones as well as his shadow cast behind him and across his face from the angle of the candlelight give him a looming appearance. In contrast, the woman is lit fully in the face by the candlelight, and wears a white blouse. It is an early work by Leyster, who was 22 years old in 1631.

== Interpretation ==
=== Contrast with contemporary works ===
Meg Lota Brown, professor of English at the University of Arizona, and Kari Boyd McBride, professor of Women's Studies at the same, consider The Proposition to be "one of [Leyster's] most intriguing works from her period of greatest artistic output". Marianne Berardi, an art historian specializing in Dutch Golden Age painting, states that it is "perhaps her most notable painting". Its most distinctive feature is how different it is to other contemporary Dutch and Fleming "sexual proposition" paintings, many falling into the Merry company genre. The convention for the genre, a common one at the time, was for the characters to be bawdy, and clearly both interested in sex, for money. The dress would be provocative, the facial expressions suggestive, and sometimes there would be a third figure of an older woman acting as a procuress. Indeed, in The Procuress by Dirck van Baburen, an example of the genre, that is exactly the case.

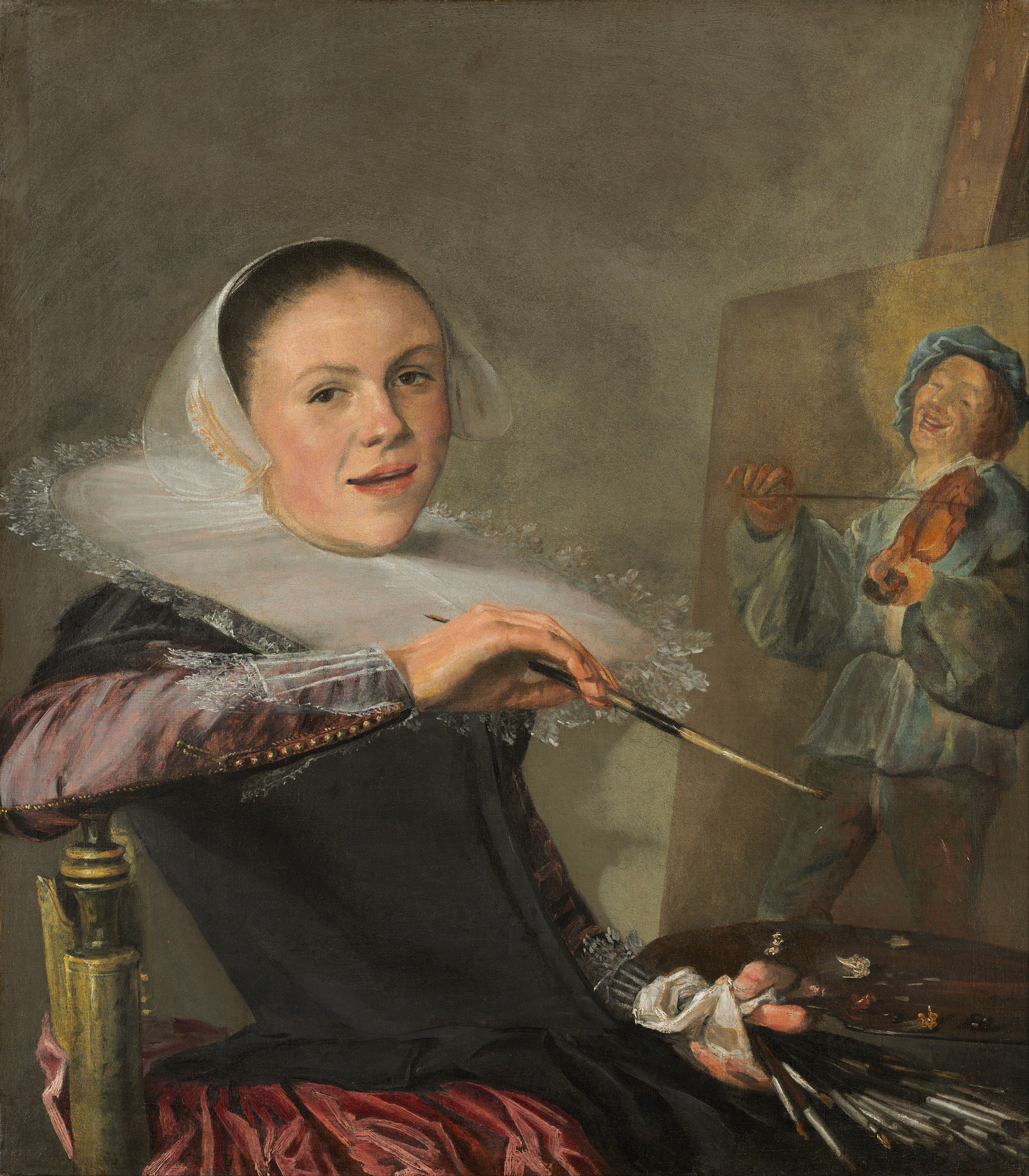
Judith Leyster's 1630 Self-portrait, the year before she painted The Proposition.

In contrast, in The Proposition the woman is depicted not in a provocative manner, but as an ordinary housewife, engaged in a simple everyday domestic chore. She isn't dressed provocatively. She does not display her bosom (but rather her blouse covers her all of the way to her neck). No ankles are visible. And she displays no interest in sex or even in the man at all. Contemporary Dutch literature stated the sort of activity in which she is engaged to be the proper behaviour for virtuous women in idle moments. Kirstin Olsen claimed that male art critics "so completely missed the point" that the woman is, in contrast to other works, not welcoming the man's proposition that they mistakenly named the painting The Tempting Offer.

The foot warmer, whose glowing coals are visible beneath the hem of the woman's skirt, was a pictorial code of the time, and represented the woman's marital status. A foot warmer wholly under the skirt indicated a married woman who was unavailable, as it does in The Proposition; a foot warmer projecting halfway out from under the skirt with the woman's foot visible on it indicated one who might be receptive to a male suitor; and a foot warmer that is not under the woman at all, and empty of coals, indicated a single woman. This code can also be seen in Vermeer's The Milkmaid and Dou's The Young Mother.

=== Feminist reinterpretation ===
This feminist reinterpretation of the picture largely originated with the work of Frima Fox Hofrichter who tried to claim in 1975 (Hofrichter 1975) a difference between Leyster's painting and others of the genre and that it had served to set a precedent for other, later, artists, such as Gabriël Metsu in his An Offer of Wine. According to Hofrichter, the woman in The Proposition is an "embarrassed victim" presented sympathetically and positively.

However, most art historians consider Hofrichter to have a blinkered understanding of the work. For example: Wayne Franits, professor of fine art at Syracuse University, later critiqued Hofrichter, pointing out that an offer of money was a common beginning of a courtship at the time, so the painting might depict a simple honest attempt at courtship. Franits suggests the "woman's unequivocally wholesome activity of sewing provided an important precedent for later genre paintings depicting domestic virtue". A number of later genre scenes remain ambiguous in a similar way, most famously The Gallant Conversation (or The Paternal Admonition) from circa 1654 by Gerard ter Borch (the Younger), and The Hunter's Gift by Metsu (both Rijksmuseum).

== Inspiration for other works ==
The 1997 short story entitled "The Proposition", in Amanda Cross's The Collected Stories, has the painting as a plot element. So also does Michael Kernan's 1994 novel Lost Diaries of Frans Hals and Katie Kitamura's 2021 novel Intimacies.

== See also ==
- List of paintings by Judith Leyster
