= Self-portrait by Judith Leyster =

Painting by Judith Leyster

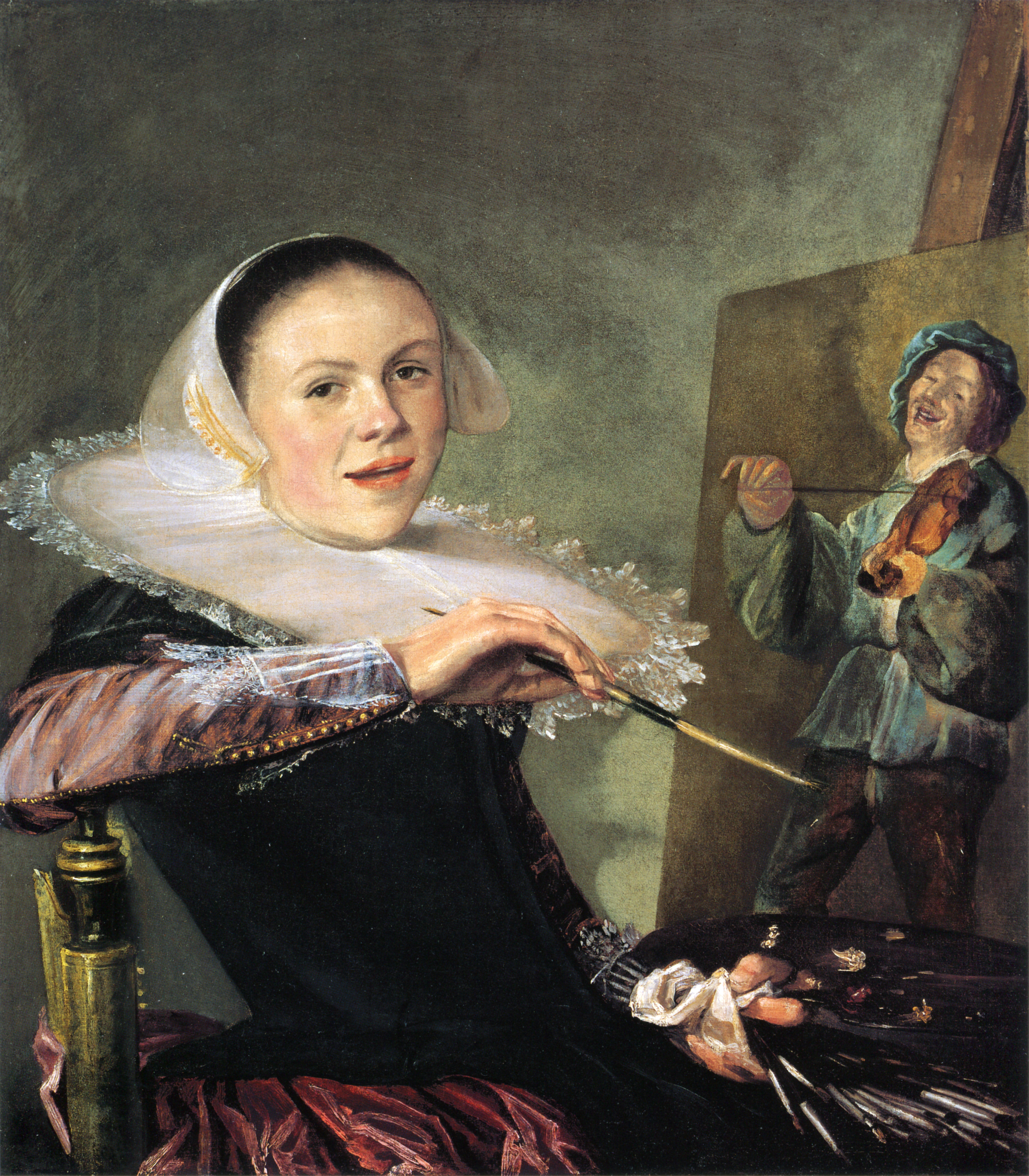
- Artist: Judith Leyster
- Year: c. 1630
- Medium: oil paint, canvas
- Dimensions: 74.6 cm (29.4 in) × 65.1 cm (25.6 in)
- Location: National Gallery of Art

Self-portrait by Judith Leyster is a Dutch Golden Age painting in oils now in the collection of the National Gallery of Art in Washington DC. It was offered in 1633 as a masterpiece to the Haarlem Guild of St. Luke. It was attributed for centuries to Frans Hals and was only properly attributed to Judith Leyster upon acquisition by the museum in 1949. The style is indeed comparable to that of Hals, Haarlem's most famous portraitist.

In 2016 a second self-portrait was found, dating from around 1653.

Though Leyster looks very relaxed, the composition is to some extent an artificial confection. She is dressed in what must have been her best clothes, which in reality she is unlikely to have risked near wet oil paint. The figure she is painting is borrowed from a different work and was perhaps never actually painted as a single figure.

Critics have found a sense of "Baroque closeness" in this painting. The artist and the viewer are very close in space. Many of the elements in the painting are foreshortened in order to feel closer and like they are coming into the viewer's space.

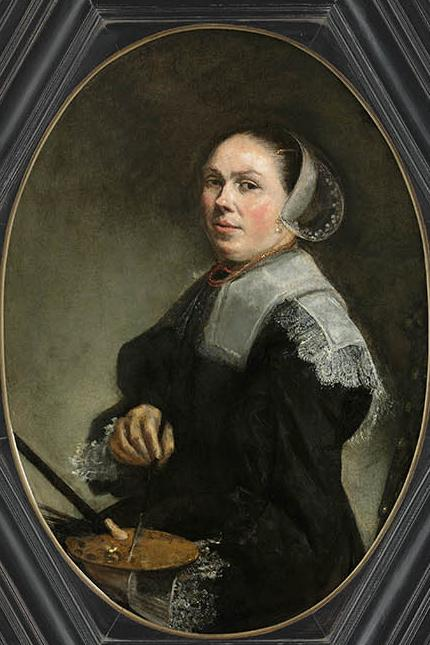
Self-portrait around 1653

== Background ==
=== Artist ===
For women during this time, being a painter was unusual. Judith Leyster, however, was a working artist at the age of eighteen. She became the first successful woman painter in the Netherlands during the height of Dutch art, known as the Dutch Golden Age. She taught students while running her own workshop and selling her works. Leyster specialized in genre scenes, along with portraits and still lifes. She would sign her paintings with a star because her last name translated to "leading star". Leyster was also the first woman member of the Haarlem painters' guild which was dominated by men. After her death, her artistic reputation became nonexistent and this painting was misattributed to Frans Hals.

=== Misattribution to Frans Hals ===
A pupil of Frans Hals, Leyster was seen as having mastered her art by the age of twenty-eight and was praised by her birth city of Haarlem. This connection to Hals explains why some of her paintings were misattributed to him. The influence of Caravaggio is also evident in Leyster's work, as seen in the dramatic contrasts between light and shadows. The illusion of illumination, along with soft, broad brushstrokes, was a shared characteristic of both Leyster and Hals. Both of their works included light, airy brushstrokes and similar subject matter. Because she did not sign many of her paintings with her maiden name, art historians would often misattribute her paintings to Frans Hals or other male Dutch painters of her time. Her Self-Portrait was supposed to be executed in the 1620s by Hals and may have been among those sold as "Daughter of the artist" in early sales catalogs. Leyster was rediscovered in 1893 by Cornelis Hofstede de Groot, a Dutch art historian. Before this time, museums had no record of paintings by Leyster or catalogues mentioning her.

=== Masterpiece ===
Leyster entered into the Saint Luke's Guild of Haarlem as an independent master in 1633. This was rare, since women were excluded from joining the guild. Being a part of the guild was extremely important to be successful. It was extremely hard to sell artworks or have a studio where one can teach unless a part of this guild. Leyster even became a master in the guild. It was at the time she was applying to be a master that she created this painting as her "masterpiece." In this painting she is showing off her skills. She painted herself in a huge lace collar and silk sleeves which would have been extremely expensive and probably her best clothes. It is unlikely that she ever actually painted wearing these. Like most sitters for portraits, she wanted to be shown at her best. They also allowed her to show off her skill at depicting the different textiles. On the easel there is a laughing fiddler in progress, a typical example of the sort of genre painting subject she mostly painted.

== Description ==
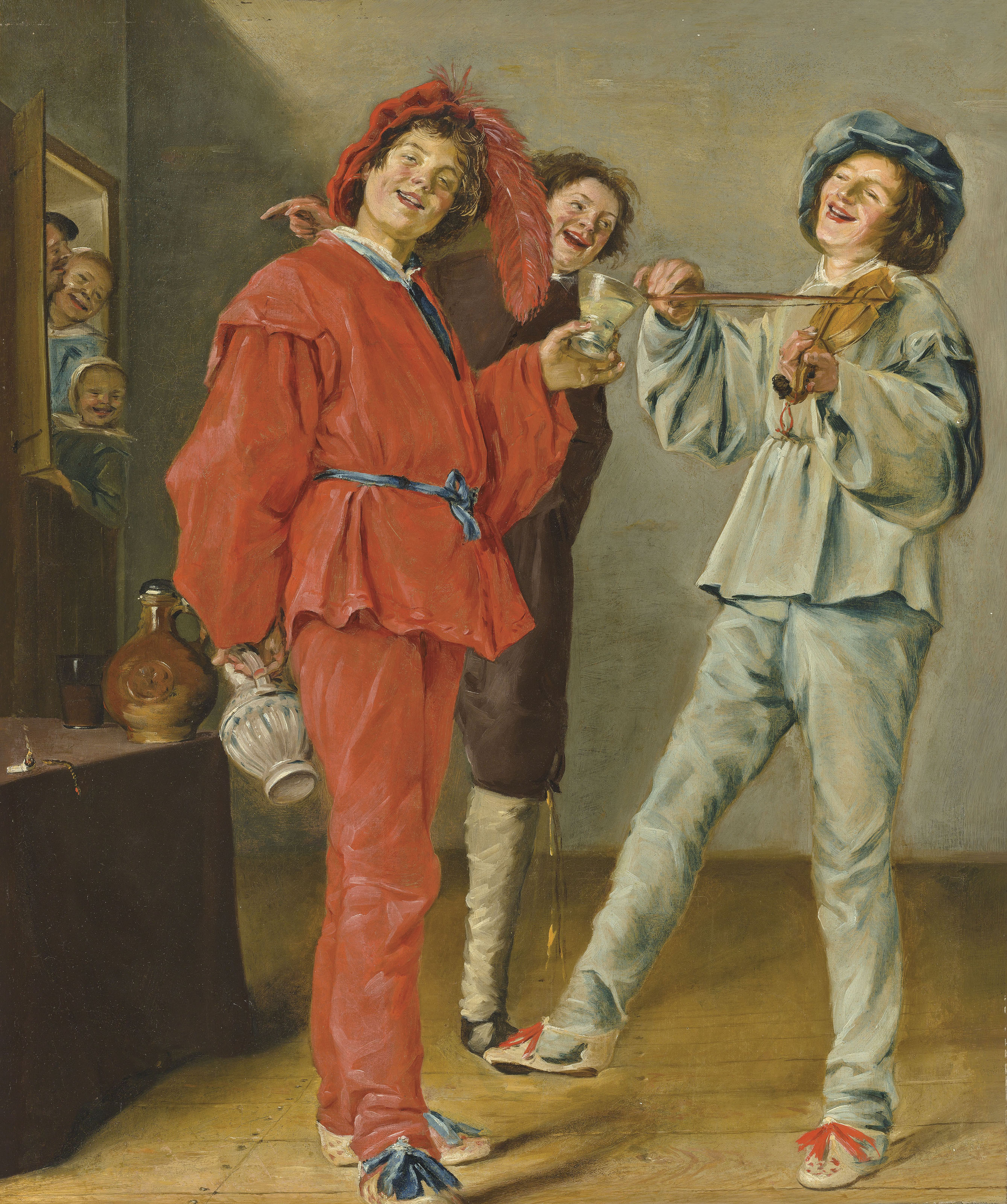
Judith Leyster Merry Trio

=== Subject ===
Continuing in the tradition of sixteenth-century artists who sought to have painting recognized as a profession rather than a craft, Leyster chose to depict herself wearing lace cuffs, rich fabrics, and a large collar, which would not have been suitable for painting but instead drew attention to her wealth and success. She also portrayed herself with tools and pigments to demonstrate her artistic skill. In doing this, she both distinguished herself from less skilled artisans and showcased her technical abilities. Leyster depicts herself working on a figure of a fiddler, who appears in another surviving painting of hers, The Merry Trio, suggesting that the piece was carefully calculated to advertise her abilities and to demonstrate that she was capable of creating portraits as well as genre scenes.

=== Composition ===
Similar to other paintings of hers, Leyster's self-portrait has a momentary quality to it—she is turned partially to the viewer with her lips parted as if to speak. This action is a possible reference to the connection between poetry and the arts. Her teeth, exposed in an upturned smile, are uncommonly on display and can be viewed as a betrayal of modesty for women. While it is unclear whether Leyster studied under Hals, the loose brush strokes and casual pose echo his stylistic choices. Leyster also paints herself with her arm propped up, resting on the chair that mimics her casual and confident demeanor. Her hands hold a total of eighteen brushes between them without a mahlstick in sight, displaying her advanced skills. She is also looking towards the viewer, as if to invite them into her studio space.

=== Changes to Painting ===
According to Hofrichter, X-ray analysis shows that the figure on the easel was initially a portrait of a young girl, and that it would be in keeping with the tradition of other masterpieces of Leyster's day to show off her artist's expertise by changing this to show that she was also capable of painting figures in theatrical poses as well as portraiture. Instead of it being a self-portrait of herself creating a self-portrait, the artist chose to take another opportunity to display her skill and her success as a painter, incorporating a popular painting of her own.

=== Gender Roles in Dutch Art ===
On the whole, Leyster's painting is similar to those of self-portraits by other women artists. In depicting herself at her easel with an unfinished painting, holding both a palette and a paintbrush, she creates a self-portrait that recalls Catharina van Hemessen's 1546 self-portrait, as well as a self-portrait by Sofonisba Anguissola that dates to c. 1554. What is unique about Leyster's self-portrait is where she places her own figure: both van Hemessen and Anguissola positioned themselves on the right side of the composition, the area known as the "heraldic left", considered appropriate for female figures. By contrast, Leyster places her own figure on the left side of the composition, or the "heraldic right", which was more suitable for male figures; this could be a commentary on gender roles in both Dutch society and the art world. This choice may reflect her status as a professional female painter who achieved financial and social success in her career.

== Exhibitions ==
- 1937 — Frans Hals Tentoonstelling ter gelegenheid van het 75-jarig bestaan van het gemeentelijk Museum te Haarlem, Frans Hals Museum, Haarlem, no. 9, as by Frans Hals
- 1993 — Judith Leyster: A Dutch Master and Her World, Frans Halsmuseum, Haarlem; Worcester Art Museum, Massachusetts, 1993, no. 7, as by Leyster
- 2009 — Judith Leyster, 1609-1660, exhibition on the occasion of Judith Leyster's 400th Anniversary, National Gallery of Art, Washington, D.C.; Frans Hals Museum, Haarlem, 2009–2010
- 2023 — Making Her Mark: A History of Women Artists in Europe, 1400-1800, Baltimore Museum of Art, October 2023-January 2024

== See also ==
- Self-portraiture
- List of paintings by Judith Leyster
