= The Lute Player (Hals) =

Painting by Frans Hals

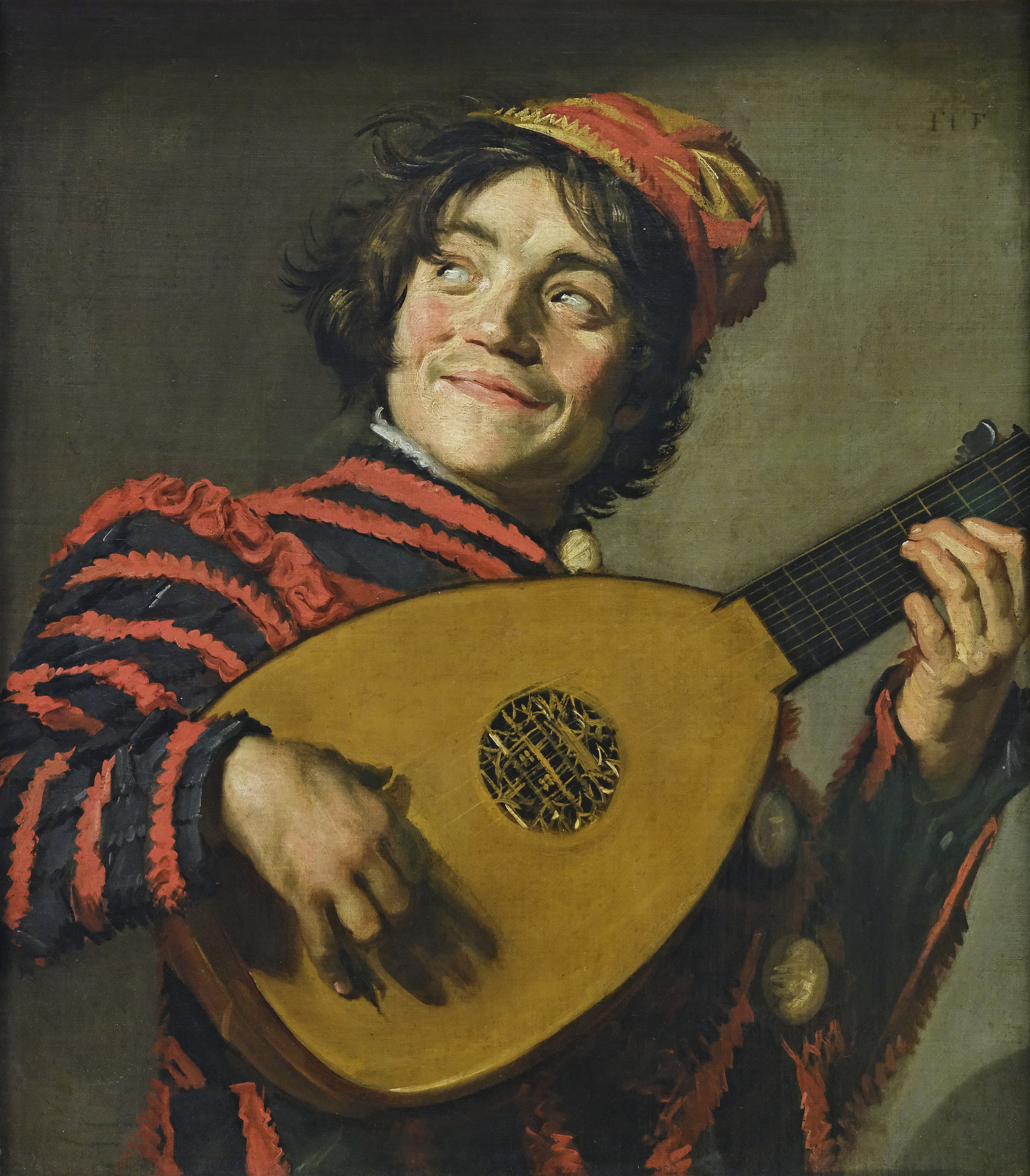
- Artist: Frans Hals
- Year: 1623-1624
- Medium: Oil on canvas
- Dimensions: 70 cm × 62 cm (28 in × 24 in)
- Location: Musée du Louvre, Paris

The Lute Player is an oil-on-canvas painting from 1623 or 1624 now in the Louvre by the Haarlem painter Frans Hals, showing a smiling actor wearing a jester's costume and playing a lute.

This painting was documented by Wilhelm von Bode in 1883, Ernst Wilhelm Moes in 1909 and Hofstede de Groot in 1910, who wrote:

98. A FOOL WITH A MANDOLINE. B. 45; M. 216.- Half-length. A man turned half-right, in a red costume trimmed with yellow. He has long hair, and wears a red and yellow cap. His head is seen in full face; he looks up to the left. With his right hand he touches the strings of a mandoline; his left hand grasps the neck. Very freely handled. Especially good are the various contrasting flesh-tones, the red and yellow of the costume, and the reflections in the eyes. [Compare 95.] Signed in the right at top, F. H.; canvas, about 29 inches by 24 inches. A copy (B. 16, and see M. 216) is in the Rijksmuseum, Amsterdam, 1907 catalogue, No. 1093; it measures 26 inches by 24 inches, having rather less at the foot than the original. In the collection of Baron Gustave de Rothschild, Paris.

The theme of a lute player painted at half length originated in Italy, and the Dutch painter Dirck van Baburen first introduced this theme in the Northern Netherlands with his lute player of 1622. Baburen's player is pointing his lute towards the viewer with his mouth open in song. Hals' player is looking up and smiling naturally, as if he is playing with a singer or another musician not in view. This painting is a good example of Hals' "rough style" of painting with loose brush strokes.

A period copy now in the collection of the Rijksmuseum has been dated before 1626 based on an engraving, and it has been attributed variously to Hals, his brother Dirk, and Judith Leyster.

Two other paintings of lute players by Hals are:

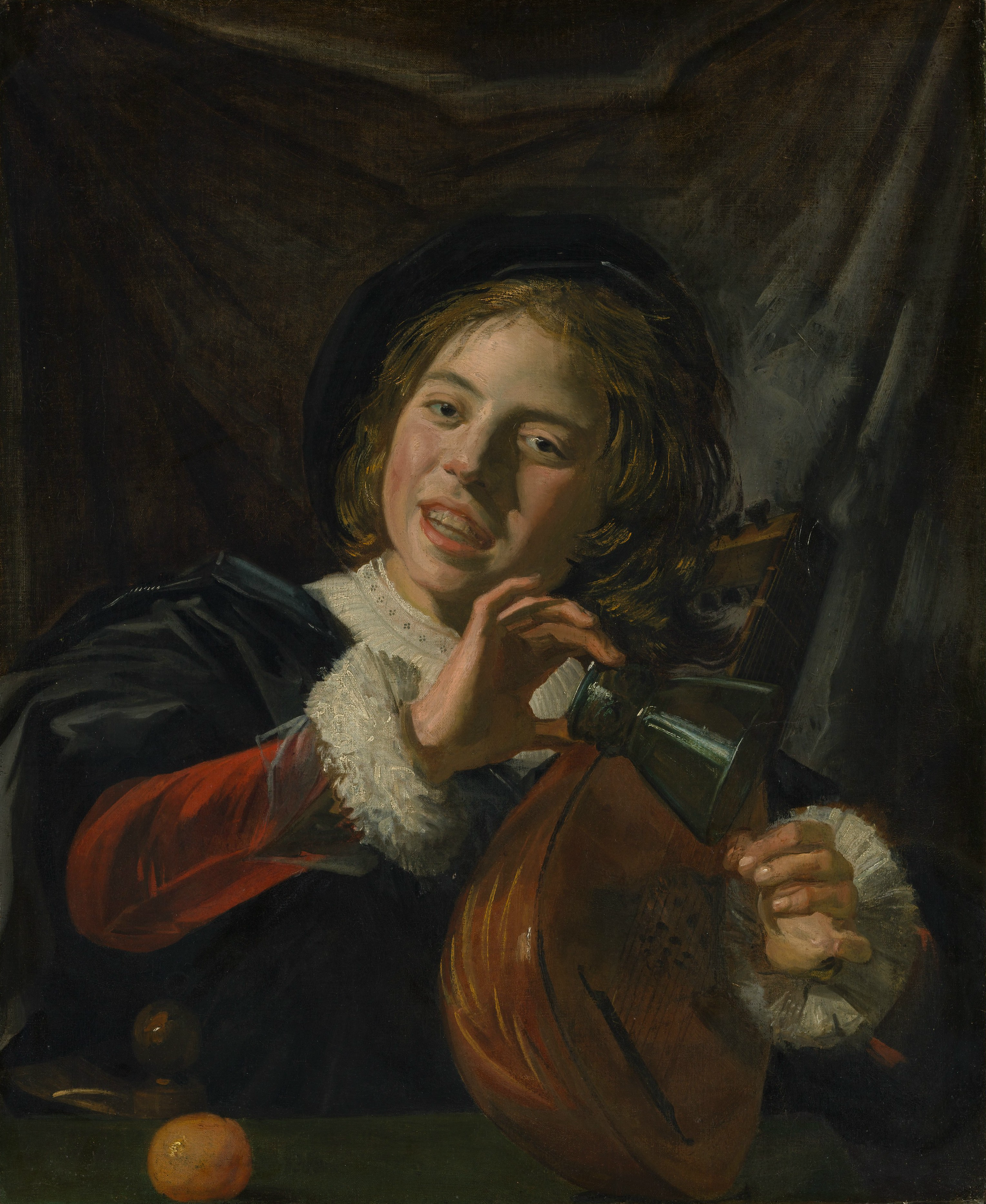
The Fingernail Test

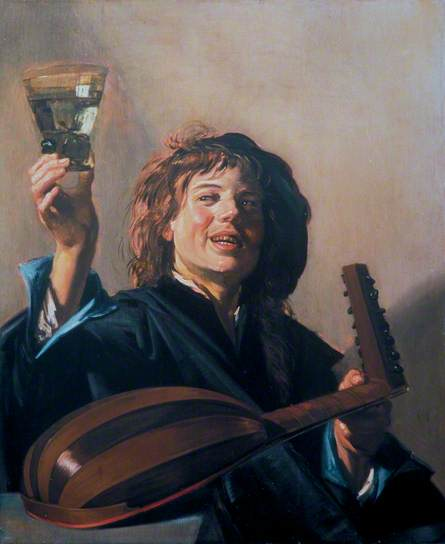
Boy with a Glass and a Lute

Hals was not the only painter to be influenced by Baburen. Hendrik ter Brugghen painted several lute players in the 1620s, and a few of them seem to merge aspects of Baburen and Hals, though his later version seems to follow Hals more closely.

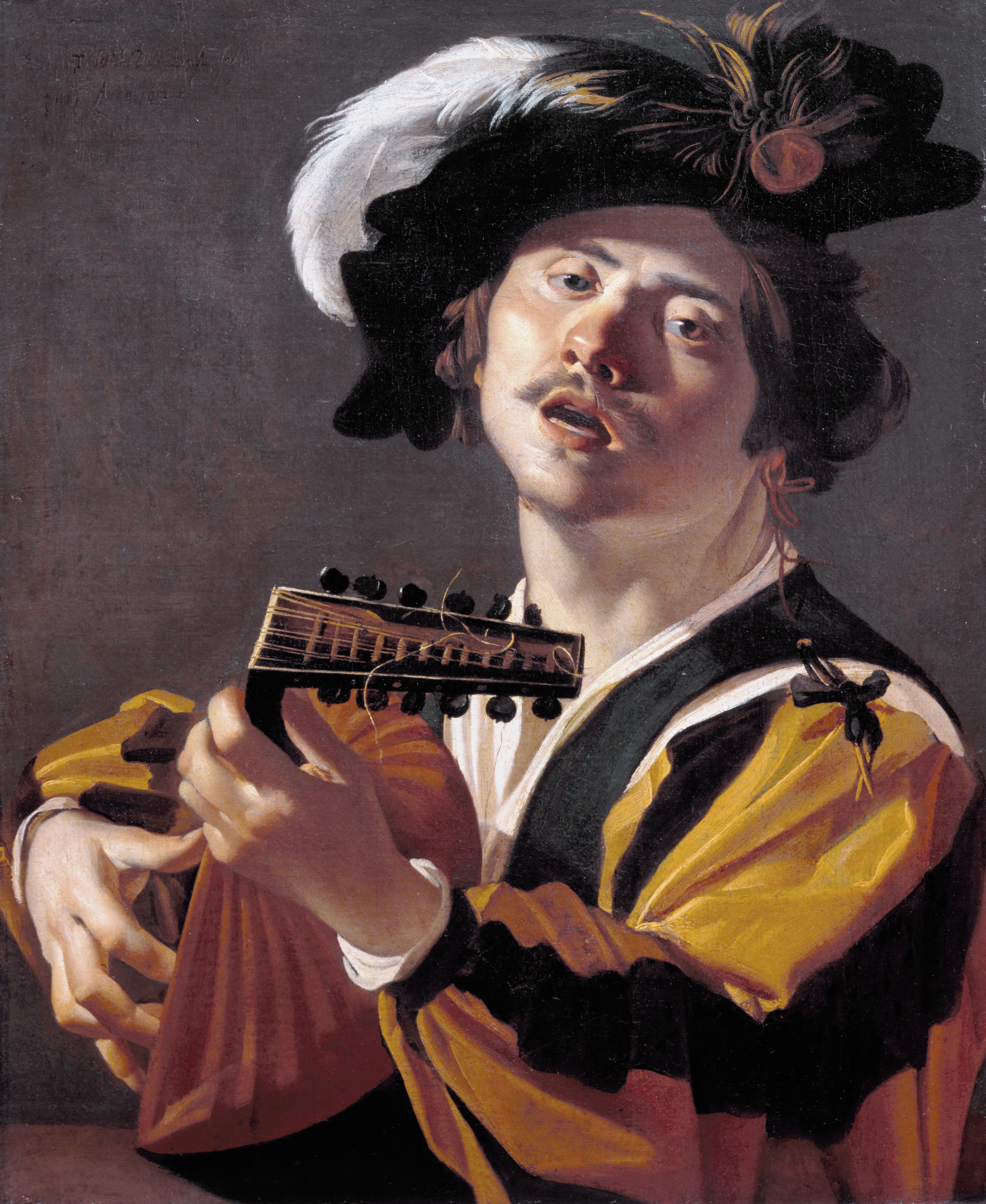
"First" Lute player by Baburen in 1622

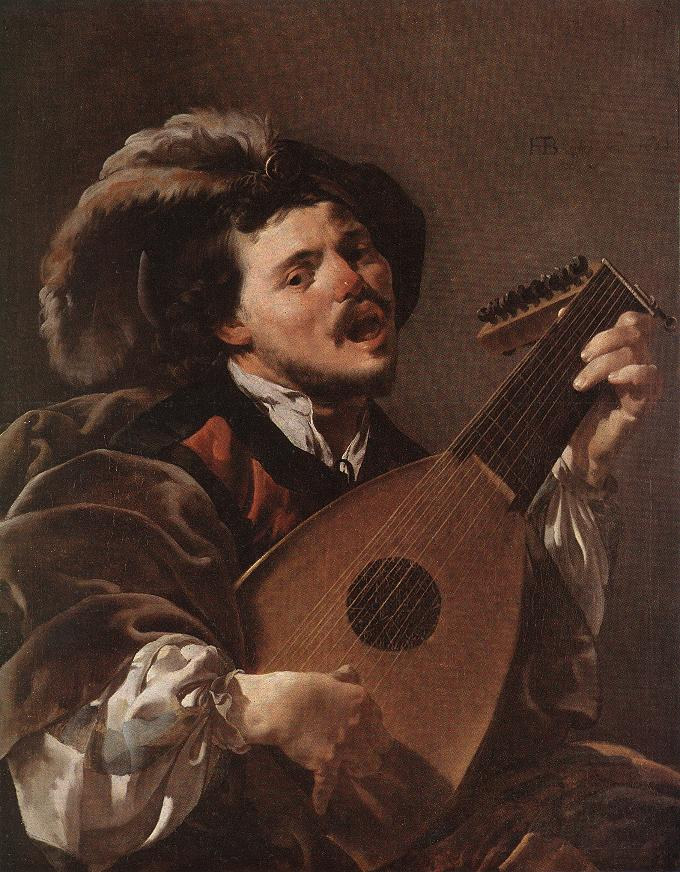
1624 Lute player by Hendrick ter Brugghen

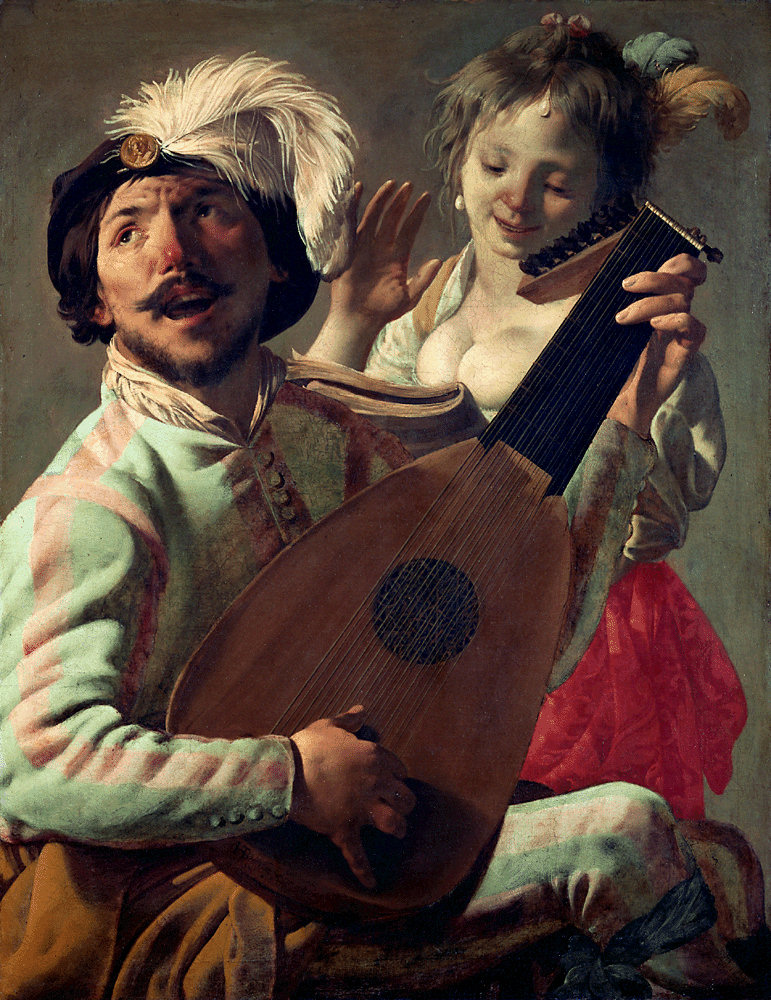
1628 Lute player by Hendrick ter Brugghen

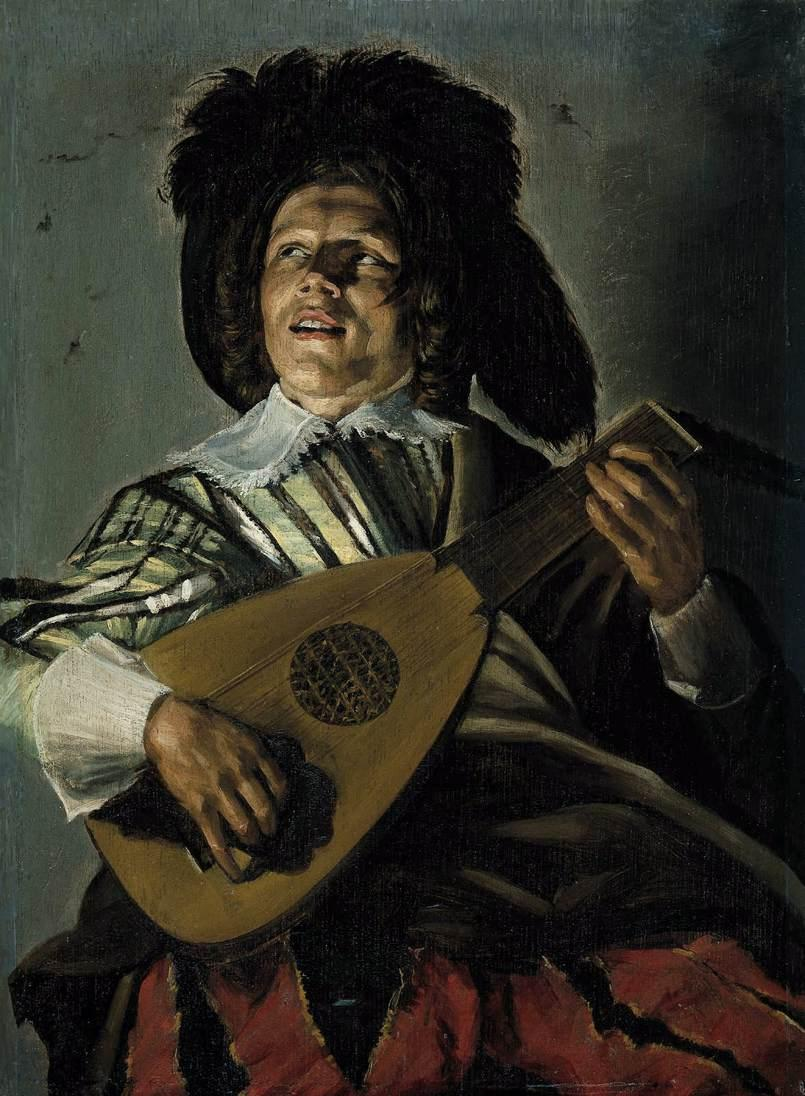
1629 Serenade by Judith Leyster

== Later influences ==
This painting has been copied by other artists, most notably by David Bailly in his 1651 self-portrait with his artist's influences, and by Adriaan de Lelie with his 1813 self-portrait with Josephus Augustinus Brentano, including this painting on the wall of Brentano's collection. Aspects of the painting have also been copied, such as the pose of the hands and the upward smiling face, such as Jan Steen's self-portrait as a smiling lute player. The Lute Player was also reworked in a 2004 painting by Herman Braun-Vega.

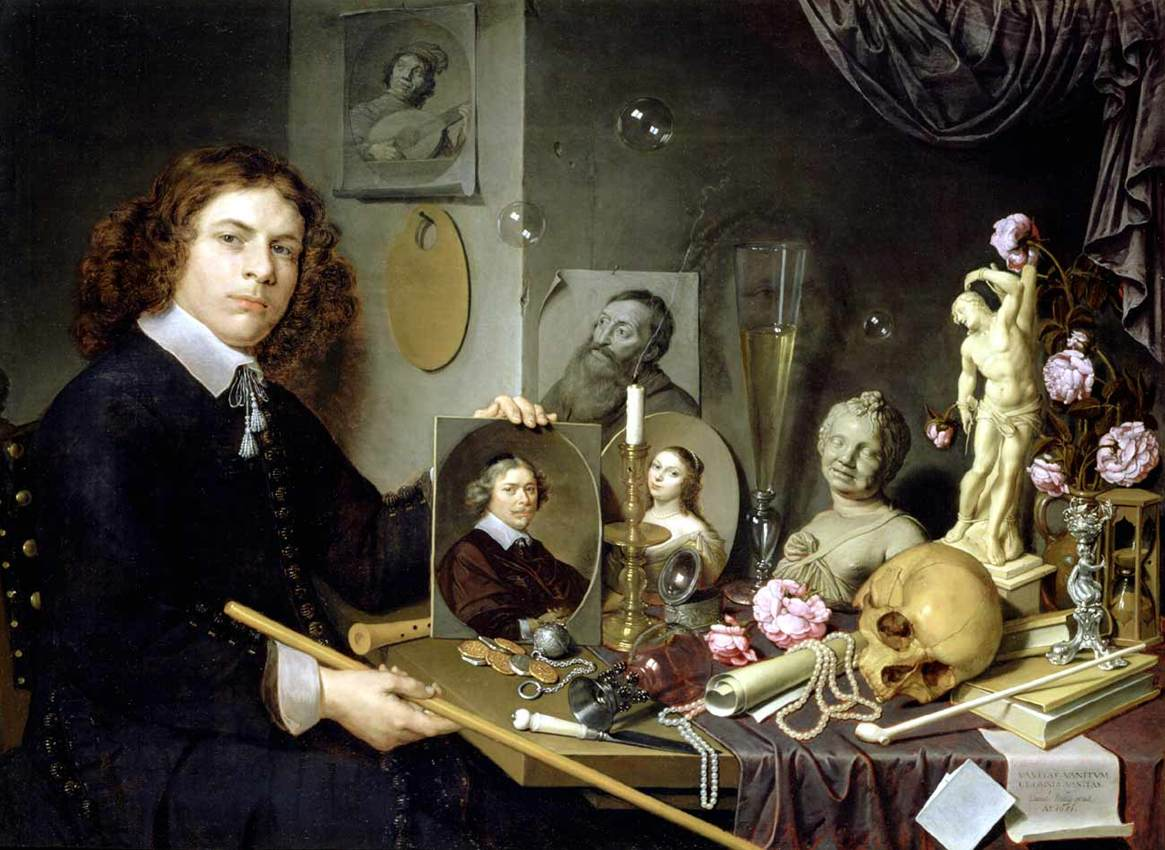
David Bailly's self-portrait with a sketch of this painting on the wall

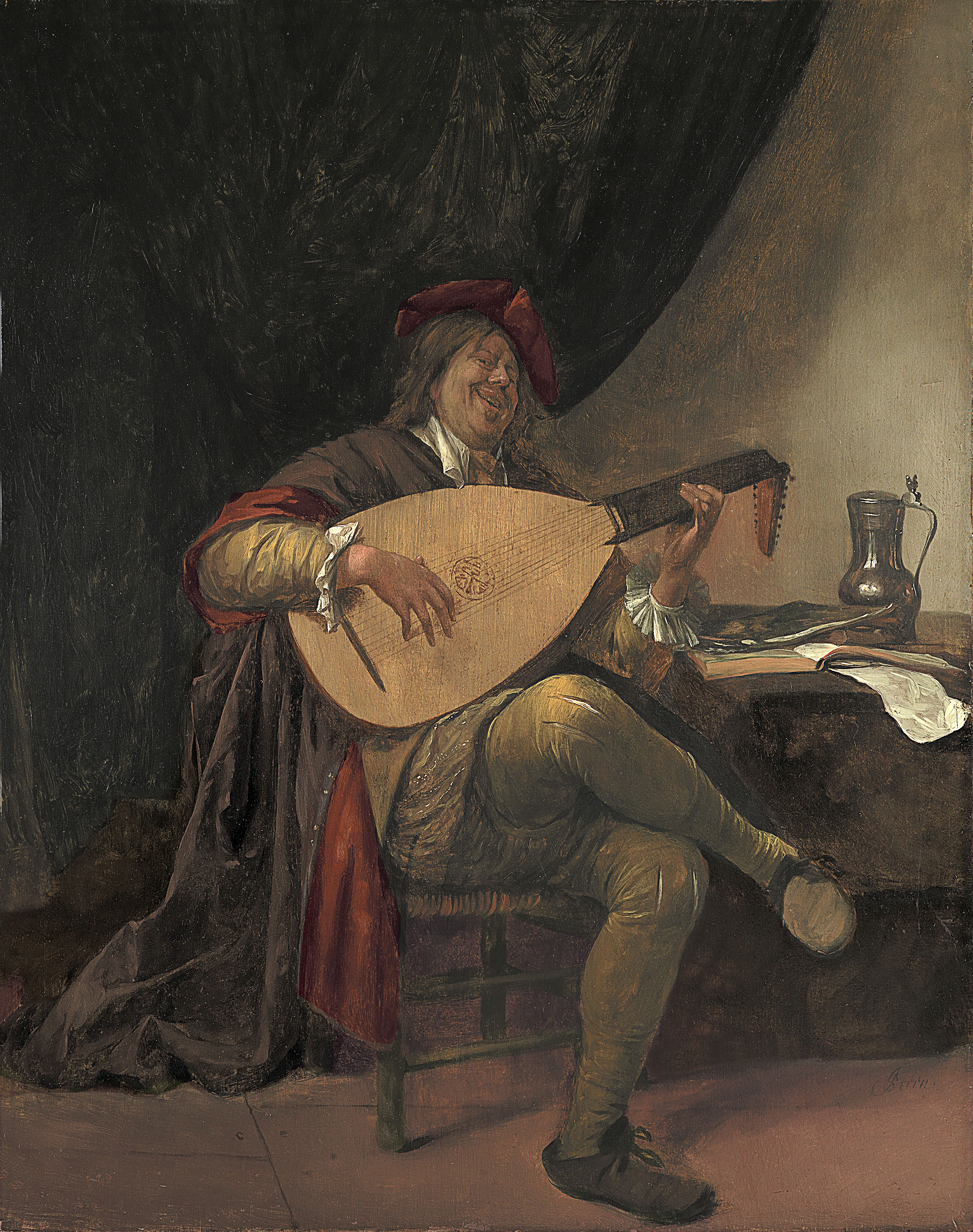
Jan Steen's self-portrait

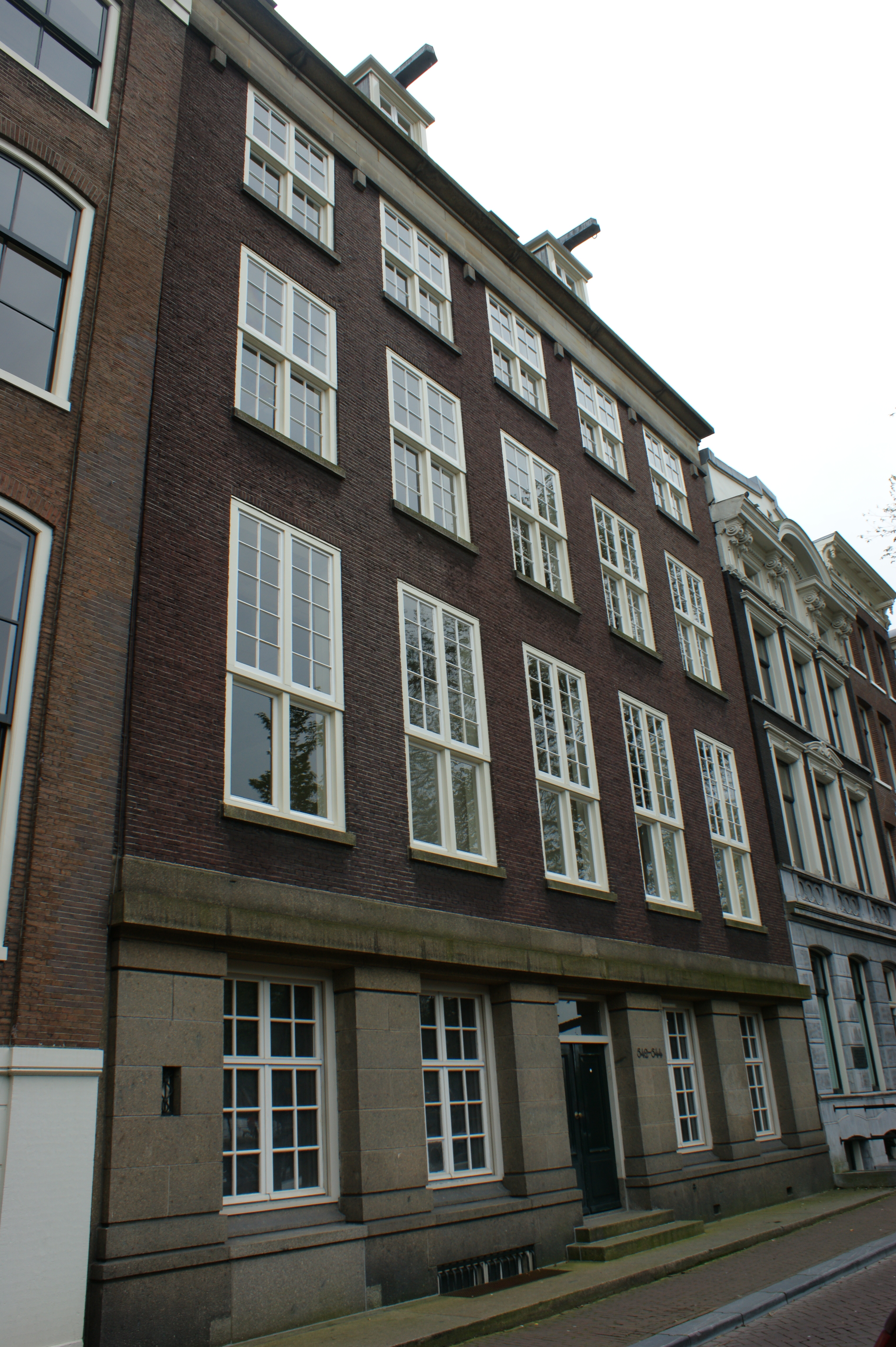
Herengracht 542–544, location of the former gallery of the art collector Josephus Augustinus Brentano

The painting was purchased by Gustave de Rothschild (1829–1911) in 1873 and remained in the family for more than a century until 1984.

== See also ==
- List of paintings by Frans Hals
