= Boy with a Glass and a Lute =

Painting by Frans Hals

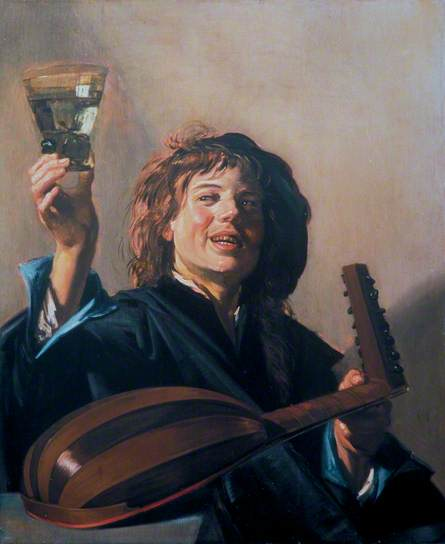
- Boy with a Glass and a Lute, c.1626. Oil on panel, 100 x 90 cm
- Artist: Frans Hals
- Year: 1626
- Catalogue: Seymour Slive, Catalog 1974: #26
- Medium: Oil on canvas
- Dimensions: 100 cm × 90 cm (39 in × 35 in)
- Location: Guildhall Art Gallery, London

Boy with a Glass and a Lute is an oil-on-canvas painting by the Dutch Golden Age painter Frans Hals, painted in 1626 and now in the Guildhall Art Gallery, London.

== Painting ==
The painting shows a boy with a lute who is holding a glass above his head with his right hand; with his left hand, he balances a lute which rests on a table.

== Name ==
In his 1910 catalog of Frans Hals works Hofstede de Groot wrote:

82. THE LAUGHING MANDOLINE-PLAYER. M. 214. A young man with long dishevelled hair sits holding up in his right hand a glass full of wine, at which he looks with a smile. His dark costume is trimmed with blue; his cap hangs on the back of his head, to the left. With his left hand he holds up one end of a mandoline, the other end of which rests on a table. Signed on the right with the monogram; panel, 36 inches by 30 inches. Exhibited at the Royal Academy Winter Exhibition, London, 1891, No. 72.

Hals' positioning of a figure looking upwards was common to many of his genre paintings of the 1620s:

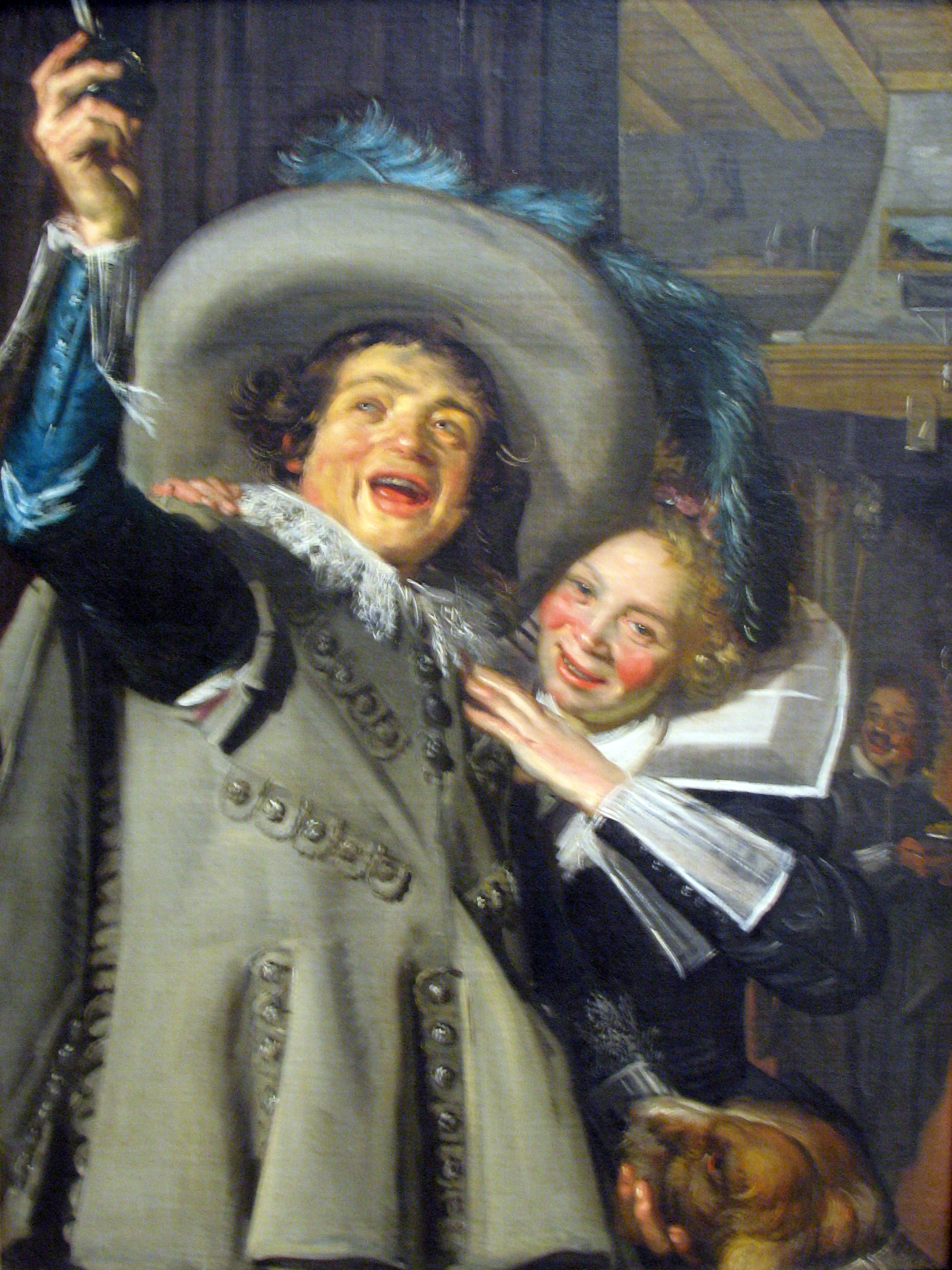
Yonker Ramp and his sweetheart

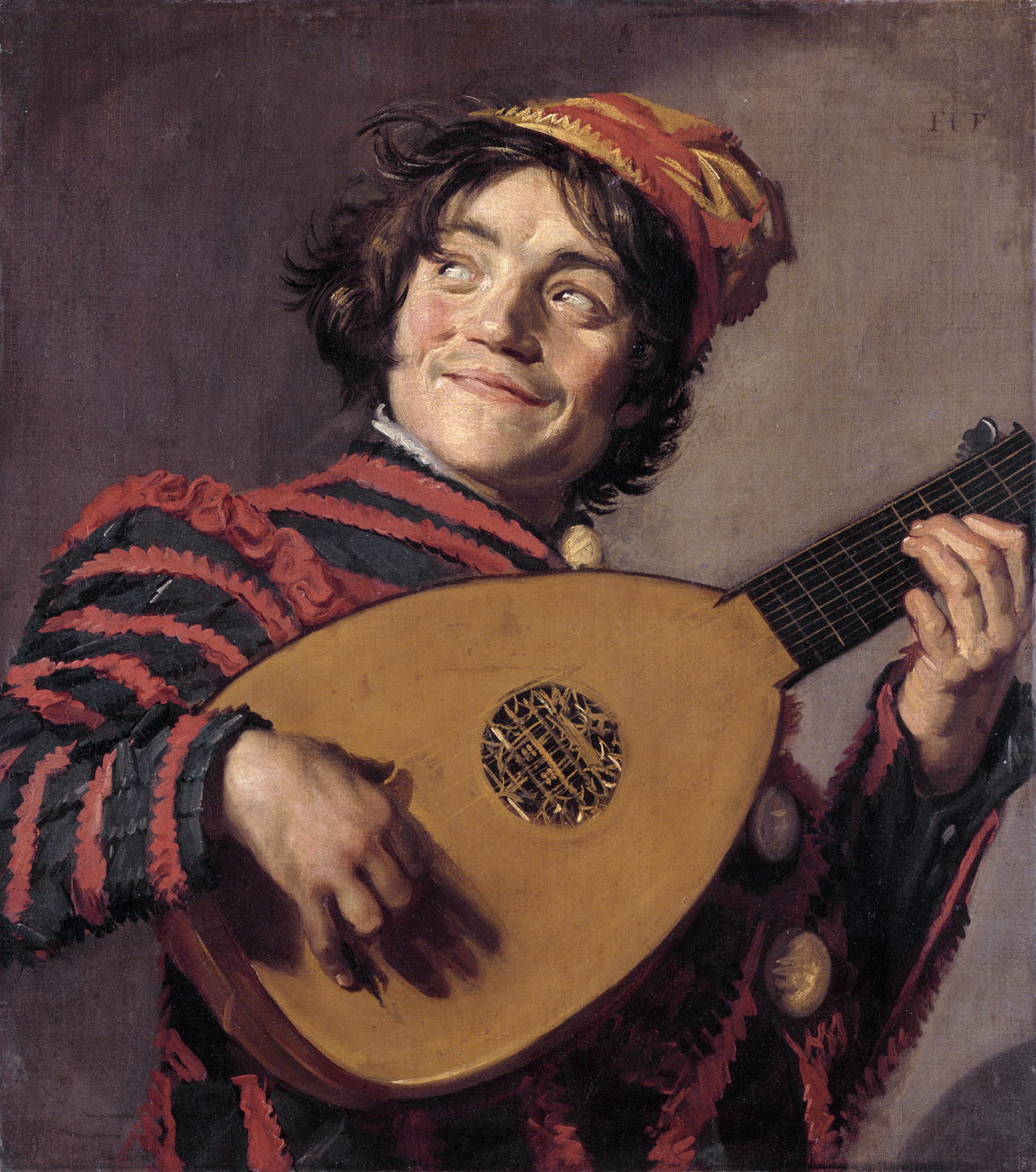
The Lute Player (Hals)

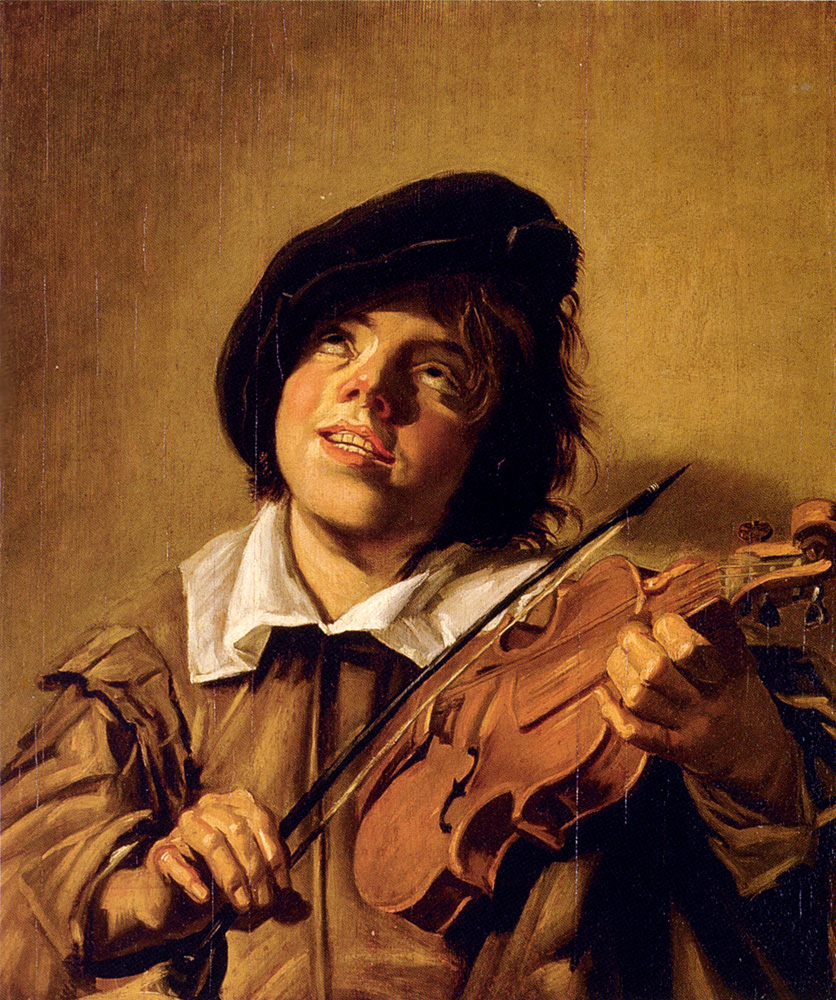
Boy Playing A Violin, today attributed to the "Master of the upward glance" or "School of Judith Leyster and Frans Hals"

This painting is probably related to The Fingernail Test:

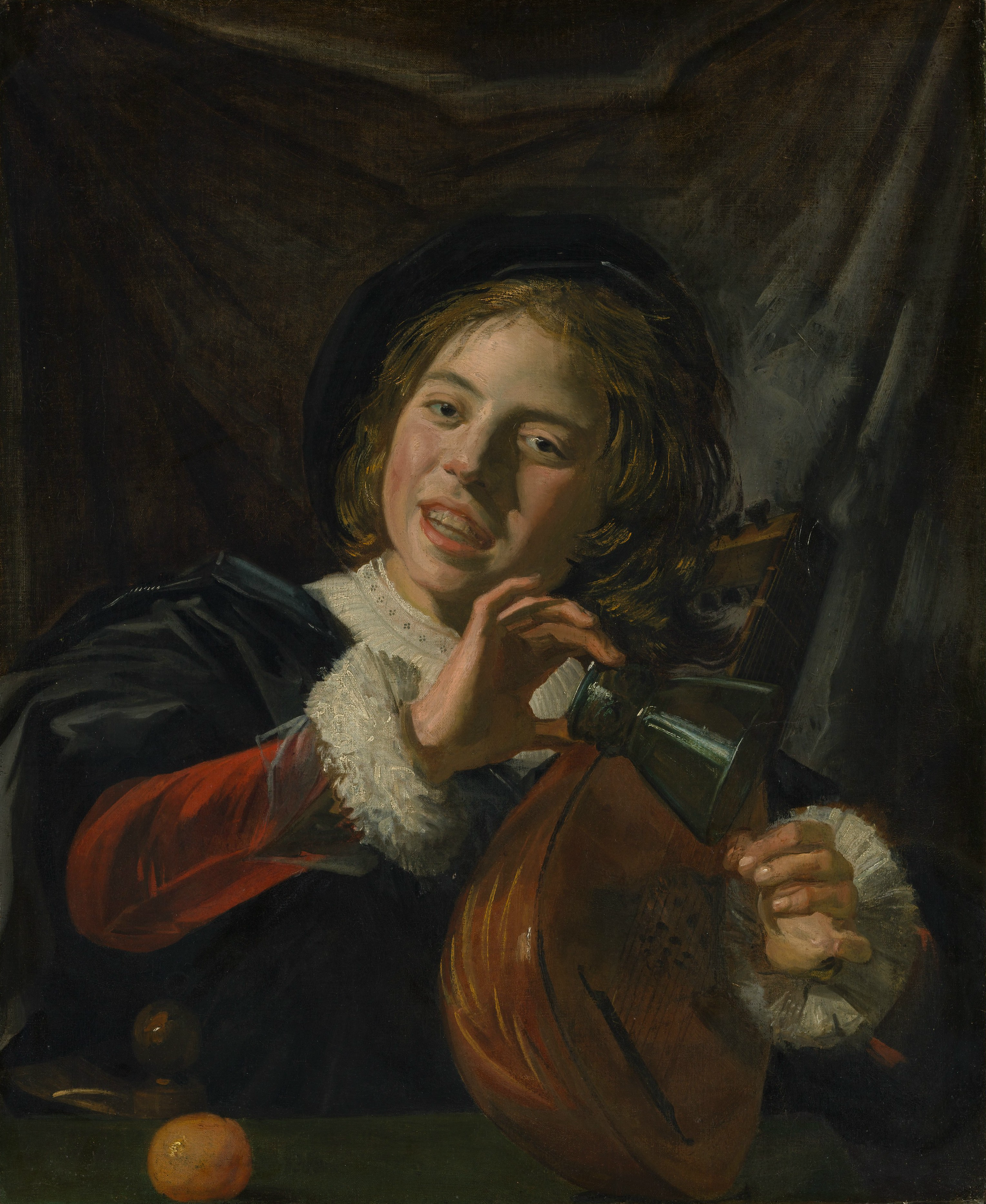

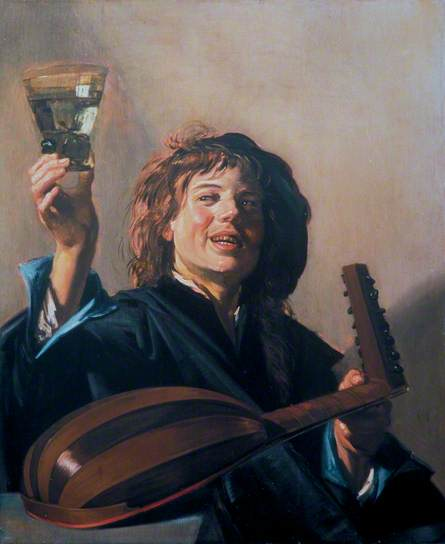

== See also ==
- List of paintings by Frans Hals
