= Copy of Lute Player by Frans Hals =

17th century oil painting by Judith Leyster

Young man playing the lute
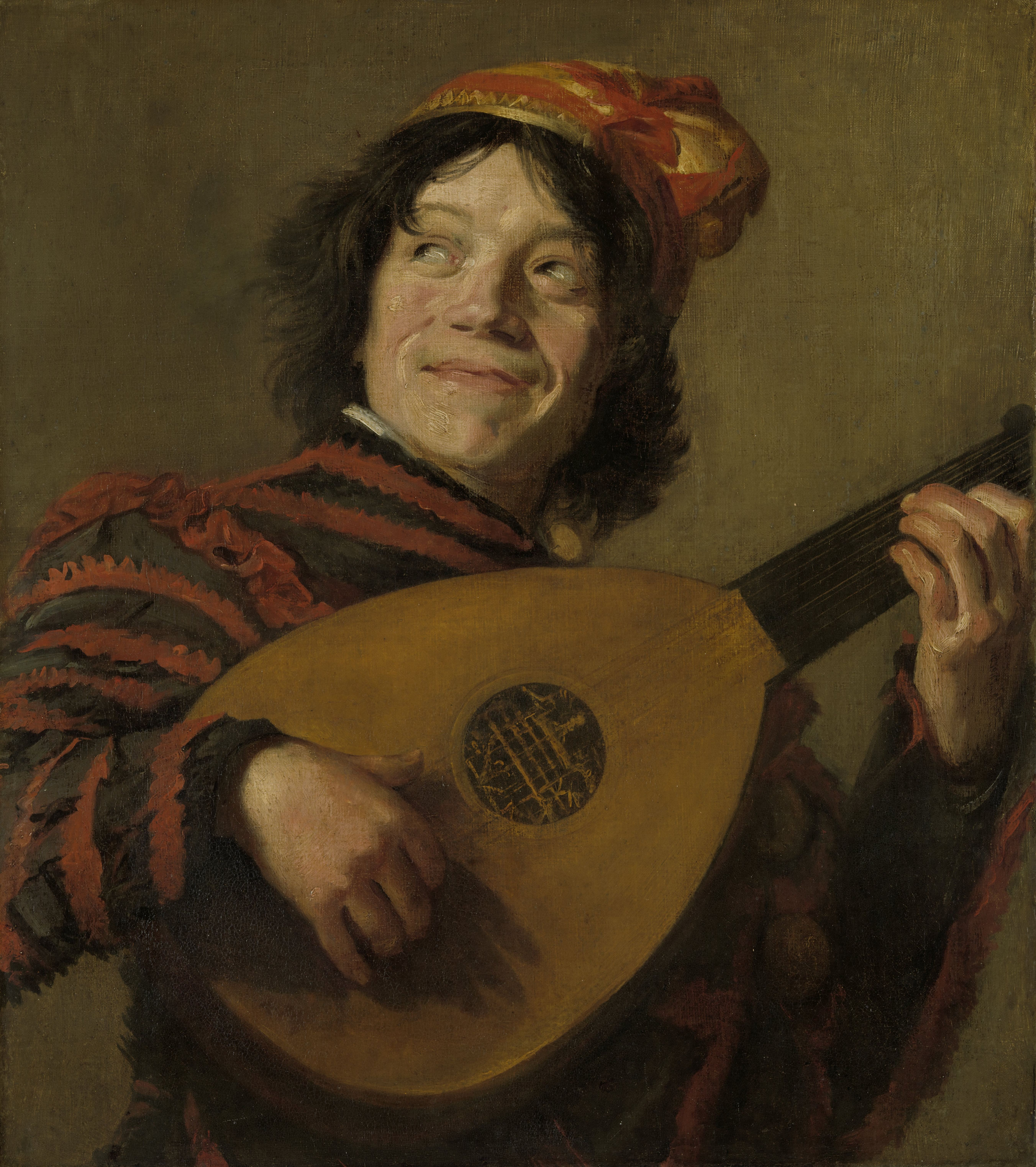
- Artist: Judith Leyster
- Year: before 1624
- Medium: Oil on canvas
- Dimensions: 67 cm × 60 cm (26 in × 24 in)
- Location: Rijksmuseum, Amsterdam

Young man playing the lute is an oil painting executed in 1624 by the Dutch Golden Age artist Judith Leyster. It is now in the collection of the Rijksmuseum, and is a period copy of the same subject by Frans Hals. It was acquired by the museum as a painting by Frans Hals and was skipped by the researcher Juliane Harms in 1927, being finally attributed to Leyster by Seymour Slive in 1974.

== Provenance ==
The painting was sold in Amsterdam in 1822, but was in Dordrecht by 1850 where it was later bequeathed to the museum in 1870 by L. Dupper Wz. in 1883 it was documented by Wilhelm von Bode as by Hals and in 1910 Hofstede de Groot called it a copy of the version in the collection of Baron Gustave de Rothschild, Paris (now in the Louvre).

According to Hofrichter, the copy is better documented than the original, because a drawing by David Bailly is dated 1624 and is clearly drawn from the copy. A painted copy also exists that is either based on the copy or the drawing, based on the part in the hair. The date of 1624 makes the painting one of the earliest works by Leyster and is distinguished by the upward glance that became her trademark in later works.

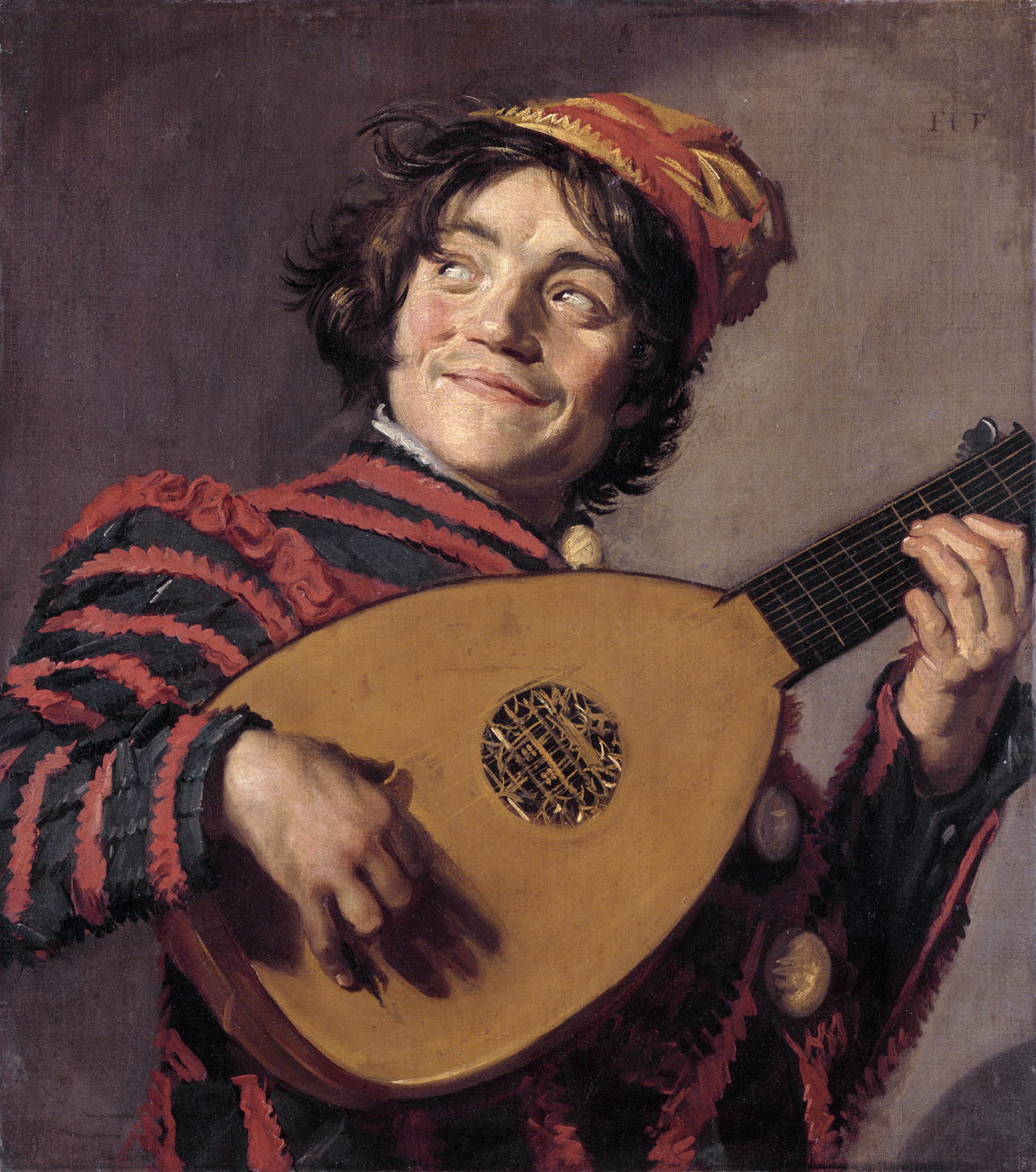

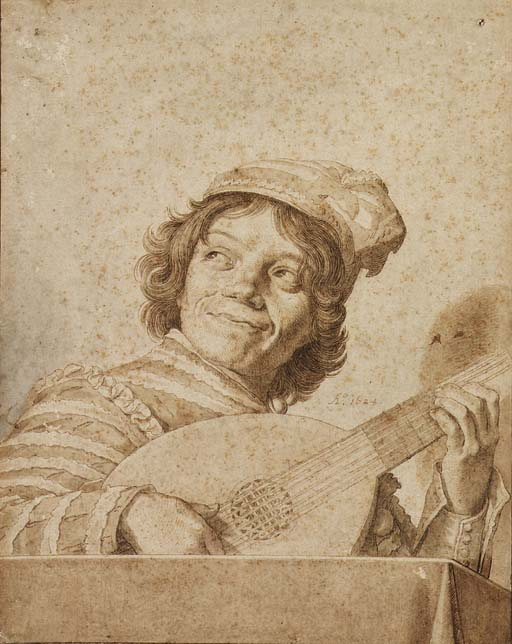

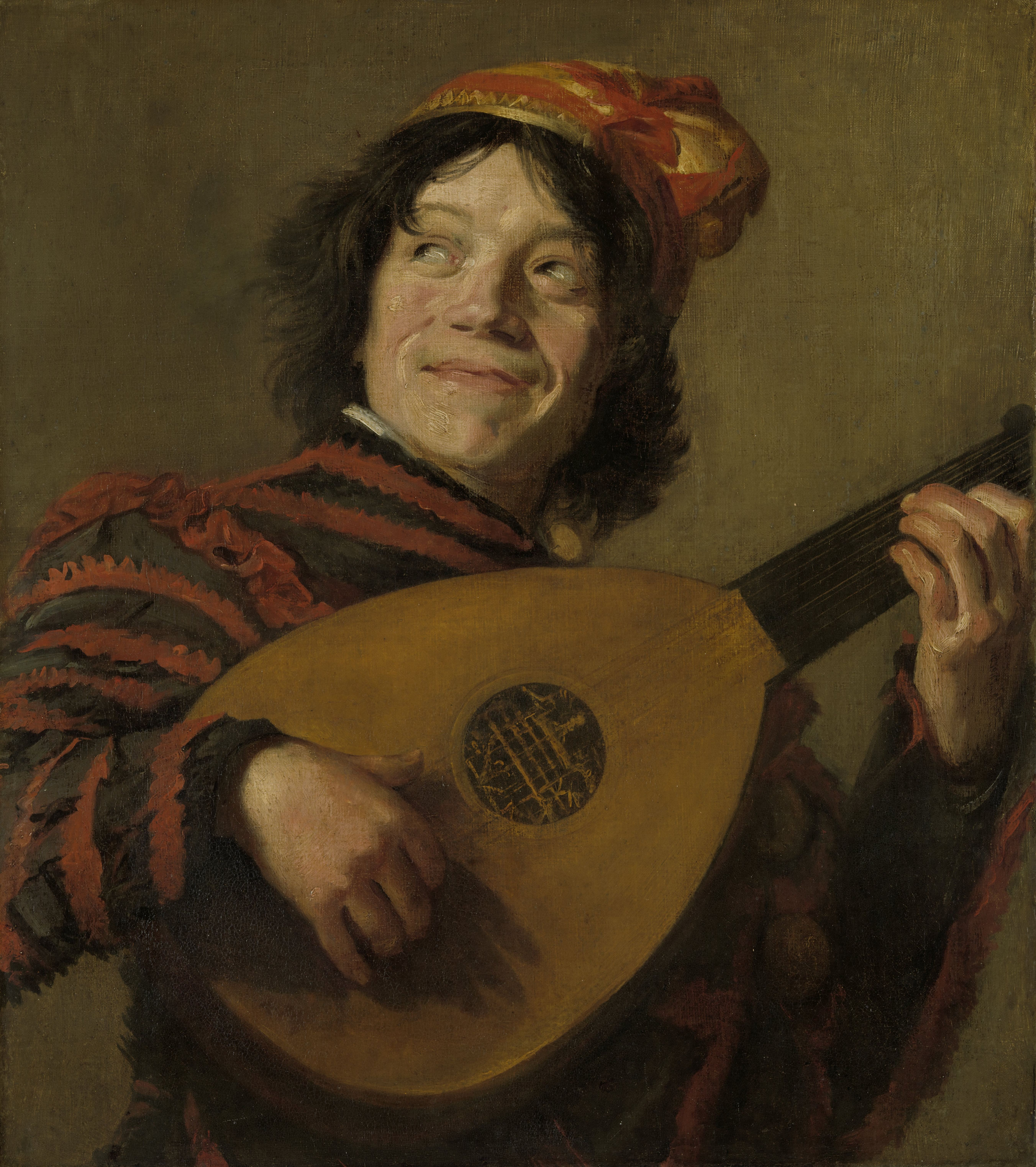

== See also ==
- List of paintings by Judith Leyster
- List of paintings by Frans Hals
