= The Fingernail Test =

Painting by Frans Hals or Judith Leyster

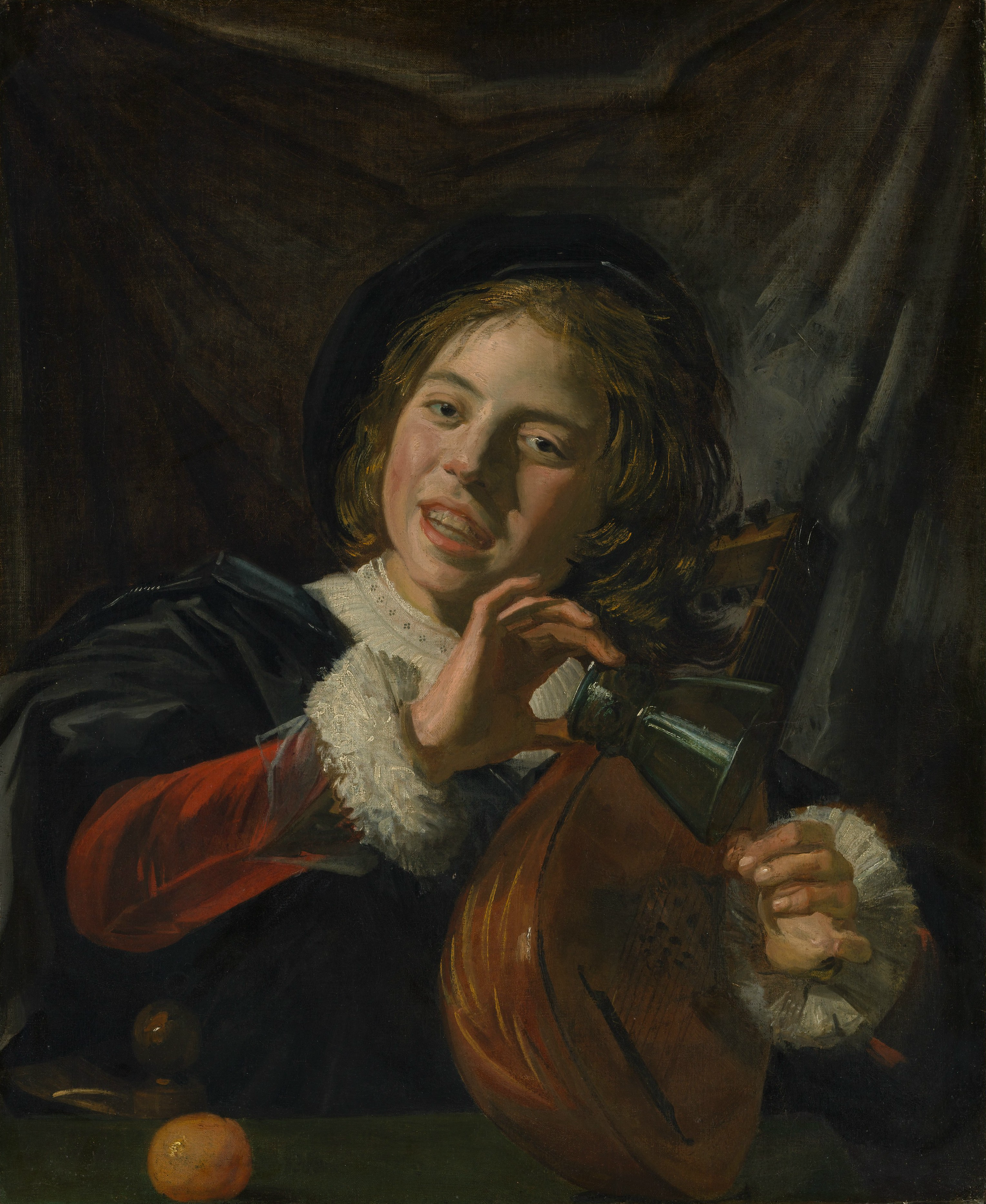
- The Fingernail Test, c.1626. Oil on canvas, 72.1 x 59.1 cm
- Artist: Frans Hals or Judith Leyster
- Year: 1626
- Catalogue: Seymour Slive, Catalog 1974: #24
- Medium: Oil on canvas
- Dimensions: 72.1 cm × 59.1 cm (28.4 in × 23.3 in)
- Location: Metropolitan Museum of Art Benjamin Altman bequest 1913; New York
- Accession: 14.40.604
- Website: MET online

The Fingernail Test is an oil-on-canvas Dutch Golden Age painting that has been attributed to either Frans Hals or Judith Leyster, painted in 1626 and now in the Metropolitan Museum of Art, New York City.

== Painting ==
The painting is also known as Boy with a glass and a lute and shows a young lute-player wearing a beret and a draped cloak over his chest, tilting his glass to show it is empty while facing the viewer in order to say "time is up". It was attributed to Hals for centuries until Claus Grimm called it a product of his circle. According to Hofrichter, the positioning of a figure sitting behind a table is a typical Leyster theme, and the upward glance is reminiscent of her Violin player, while the application of paint is similar to her Two children with a cat.

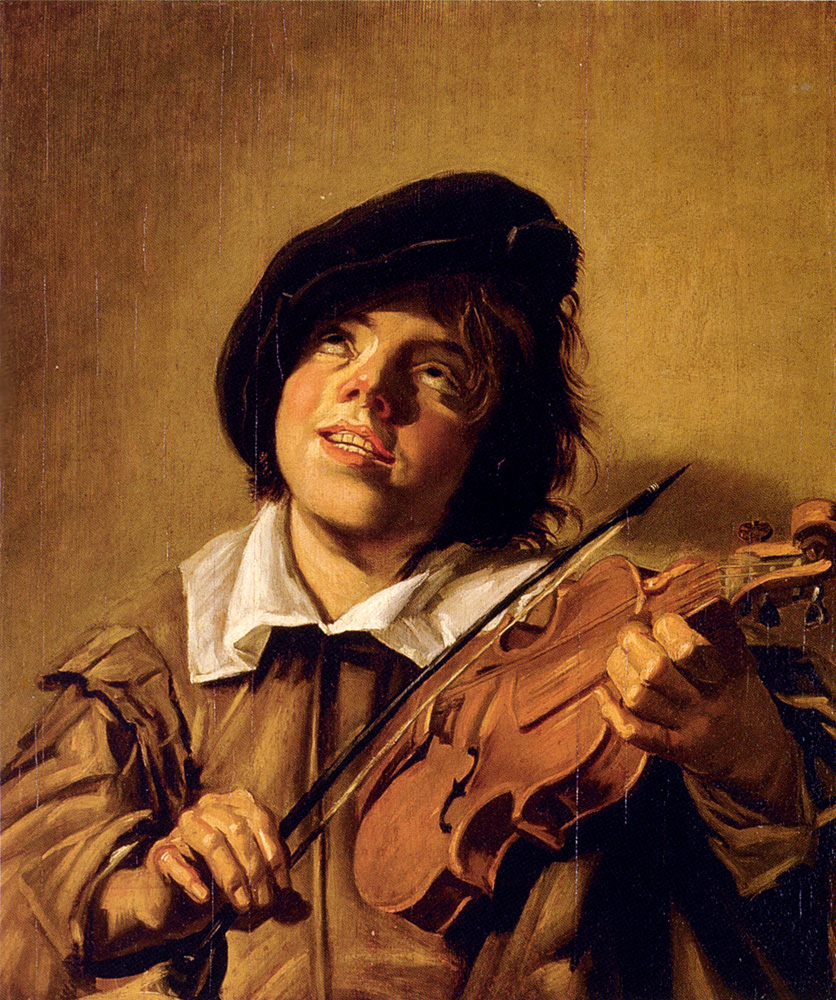

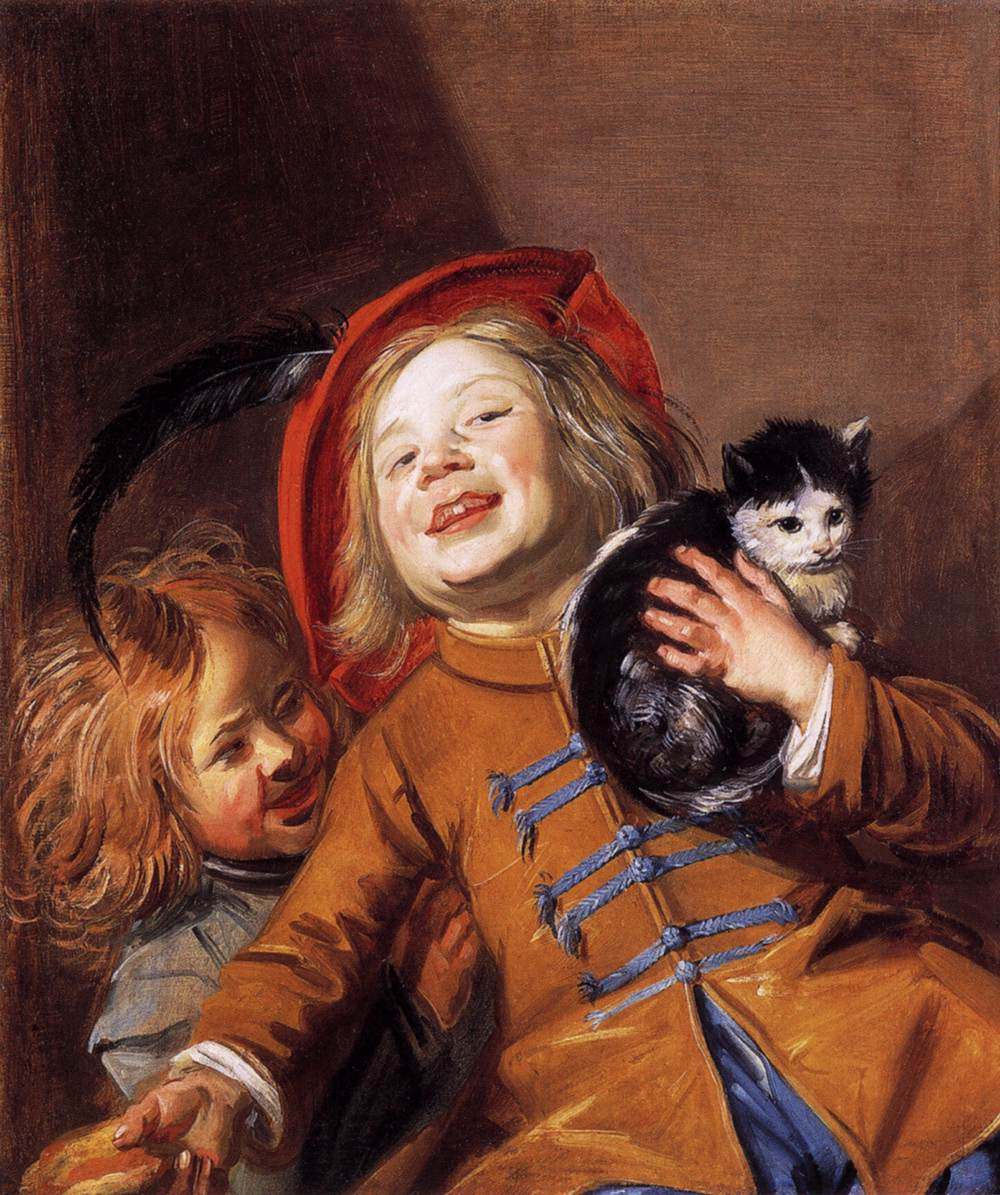

== Name ==
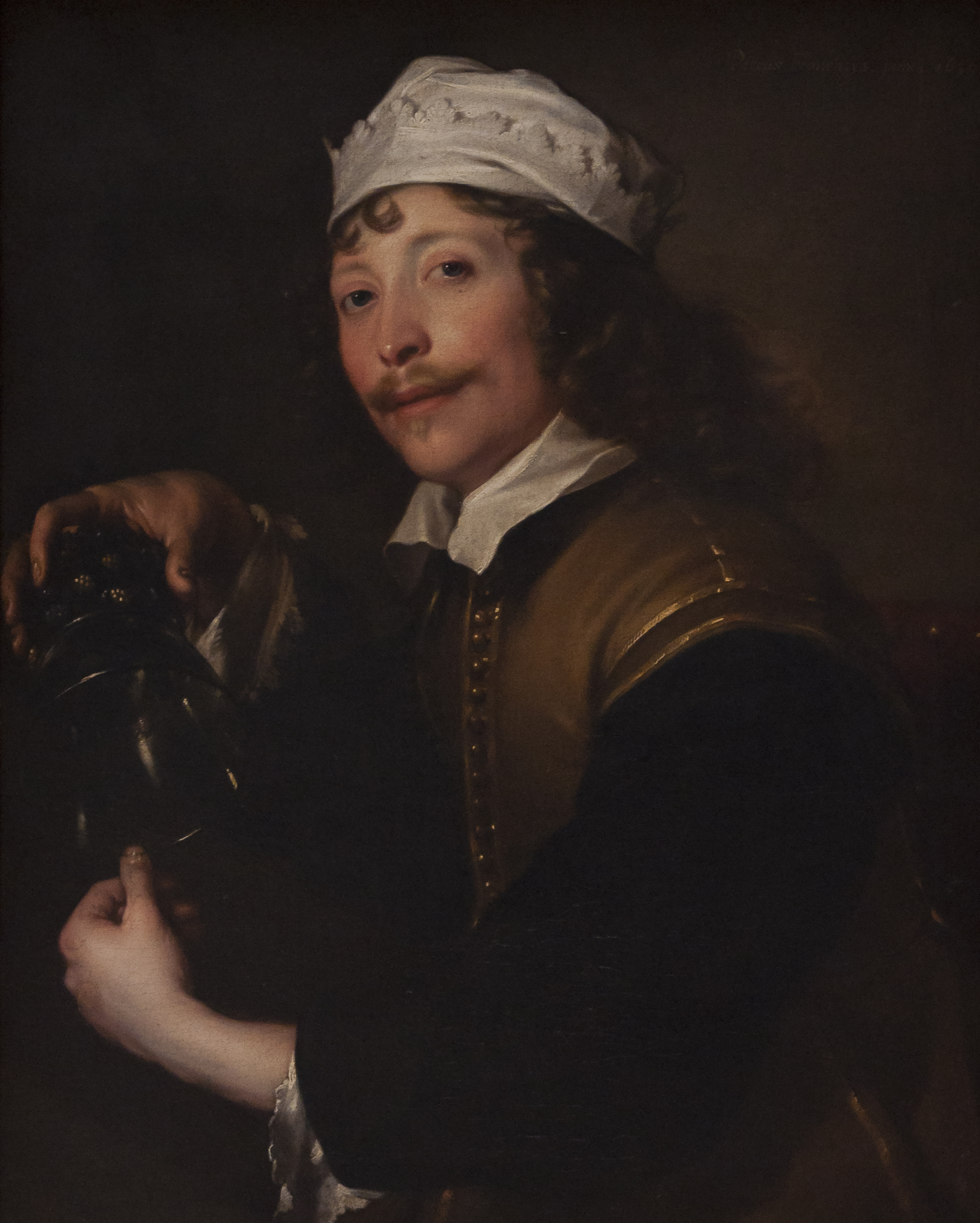
The Fingernail Test by Peter Franchoys

In the 17th century, the gesture of tipping the glass down to see if a drop of wine appears on a fingernail was a method to show one wanted a refill. The scene is often shown with figures in theatrical costumes.

In his 1910 catalog of Frans Hals works Hofstede de Groot noted this painting may be the same one as a painting sold in Rotterdam in 1825 and wrote:

86. THE FINGER-NAIL TEST (or, The Mandoline-Player with a Wine-Glass). M. 210. Half-length. A mandoline-player sits at a table, with his body turned three-quarters right, but facing the spectator. In his uplifted right hand, with the little finger erect, he holds a green goblet downwards; under it is his left hand, also with the little finger erect. The top of his orange-yellow mandoline rests on his left arm; the bottom of it lies on the table. He has long hair, and wears a cap on the back of his head, to the right. He has a bright red costume with a greyish-purple cloak, white frills at his wrists, and a white band at the throat. An olive- green curtain hangs behind him. [Compare 74.] Canvas, 28 inches by 23 inches. Exhibited at Dublin, 1857. In the collection of J. Napper of Lough Crew Castle, Oldcastle, Meath. Sale. Dublin, autumn of 1906 (3990, Sulley). In the possession of the London dealers Dowdeswell. In the possession of the London dealer C. Wertheimer. In the possession of the Paris dealers Kleinberger and Wildenstein. In the collection of B. Altman, New York.

This painting could be related to Young Man with a Skull in which a boy is also wearing a beret and draped cloak, and is also similar to a painting with the same alternate name, Boy with a Glass and a Lute.

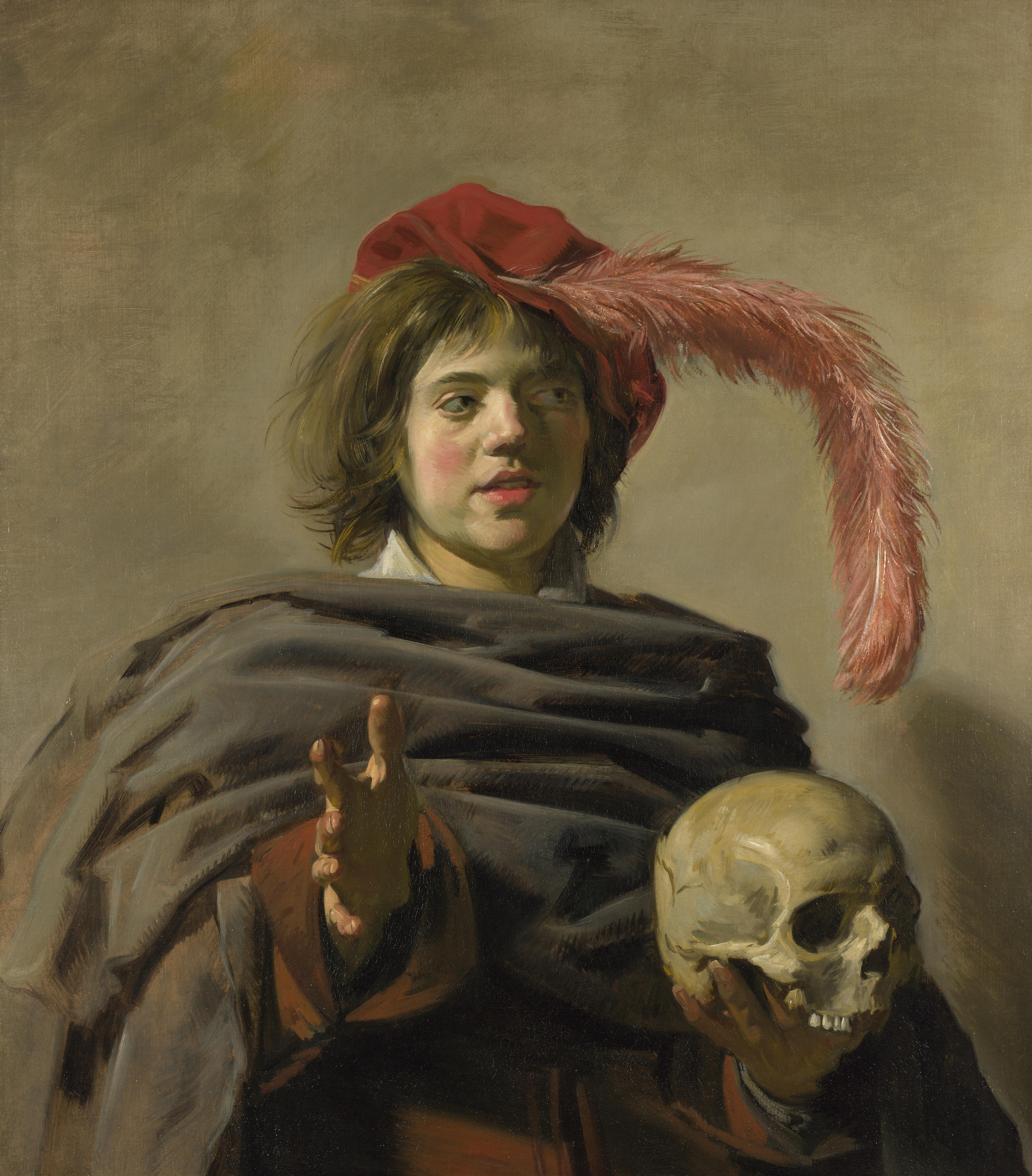

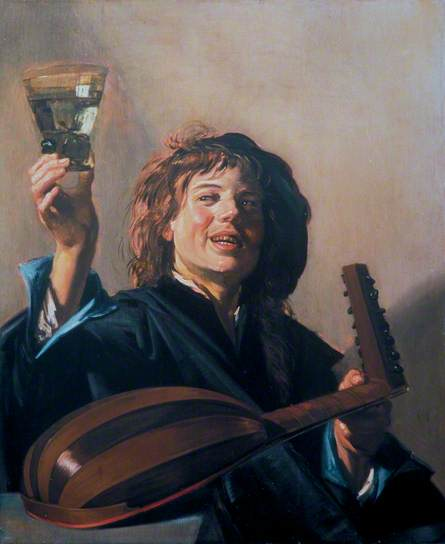

== See also ==
- List of paintings by Frans Hals
- List of paintings by Judith Leyster
