= Willem van Heythuysen Posing with a Sword =

Painting by Frans Hals

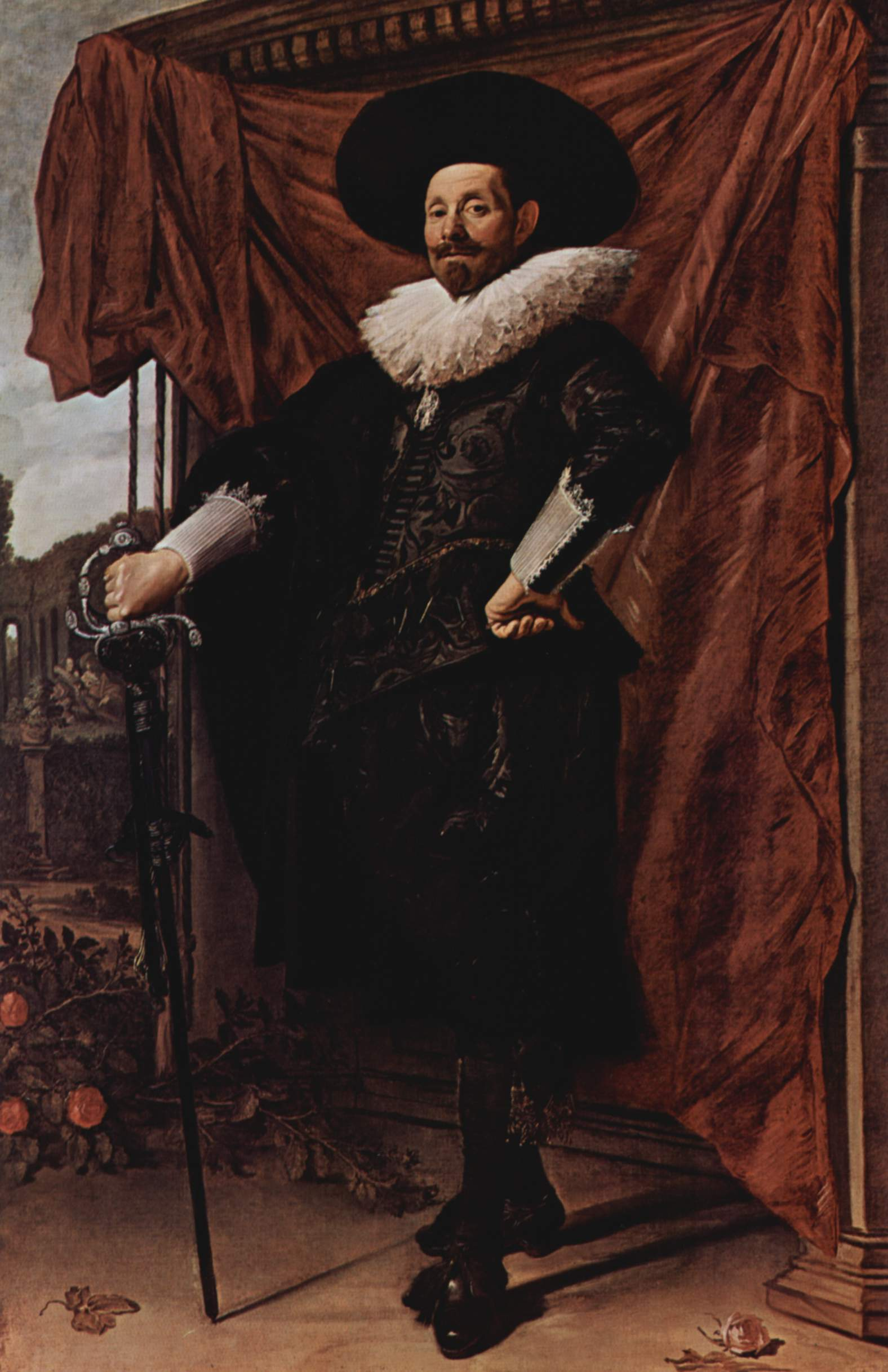
- Willem van Heythuysen posing with a sword, c.1625. Oil on canvas, 204.5 x 134.5 cm
- Artist: Frans Hals
- Year: 1625-1630
- Catalogue: Seymour Slive, Catalog 1974: #31
- Medium: Oil on canvas
- Dimensions: 204.5 cm × 134.5 cm (80.5 in × 53.0 in)
- Location: Alte Pinakothek, Purchased from the Prince of Liechtenstein, 1969; Munich
- Accession: 14101

Willem van Heythuysen posing with a sword is an oil-on-canvas painting by the Dutch Golden Age painter Frans Hals, painted in 1625-1630, and now in the Alte Pinakothek, in Munich. It shows the Haarlem cloth merchant Willem van Heythuysen in a theatrical pose with a rapier.

== Painting ==
The painting shows a proud man standing in front of a neoclassical architectural element with drapery, leaning on a sword. In the distance a garden with a couple can be seen, and in the foreground some roses lie on the ground. It was first documented by Adriaan Loosjes, who mentioned it in his tribute to Hals in 1789 as being in the collection Gerrit Willem van Oosten de Bruyn. Much later Ernst Wilhelm Moes included it in his Iconographia Batavia, and Hofstede de Groot documented it again with the following description:

WILLEM VAN HEYTHUYSEN. B. 123; M. 44. Full-length; life size. He stands with the left foot forward and the right drawn back. His figure is turned three-quarters left; his head almost faces the spectator, at whom he is looking. His left hand is pressed to his side; his right hand clasps the hilt of a sword with its point on the ground. He has a moustache and pointed beard. He wears a broad-brimmed hat, a white collar like a ruff trimmed with lace, and a very richly trimmed costume of dark blue with broad lace-trimmed cuffs. Behind him a lilac- brown drapery hangs on a fantastic piece of architecture; to the left is a view of a French garden; on the ground lie roses. Painted about 1635.

== Legacy ==
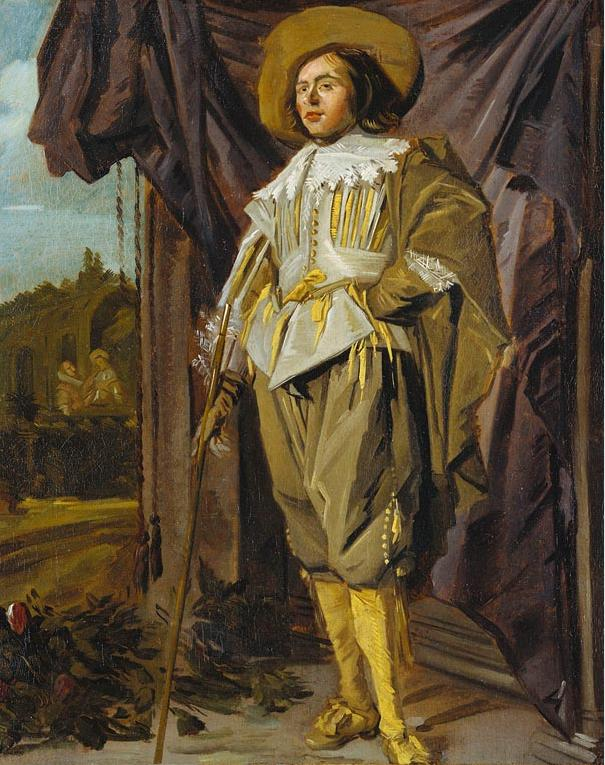
Standing Cavalier by Judith Leyster

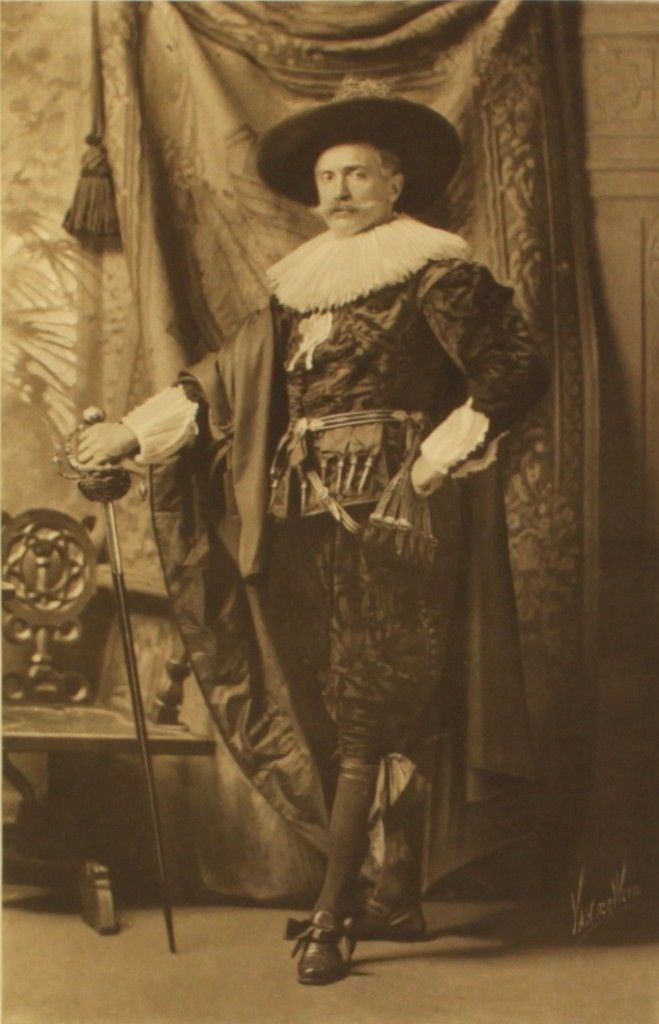
Edgar Vincent, 1st Viscount D'Abernon dressed as the Frans Hals painting Portrait of Willem van Heythuysen posing with a sword, for a costume ball in 1897, by James Lafayette

The painting served as inspiration to many, not just the poetry of Loosjes. Judith Leyster made a period copy, though she exchanged the rapier for a walking stick. Several people have posed in this stance in costume, most recently Kehinde Wiley who made a painting of a young black man in the same pose. In his 1989 catalog of the international Frans Hals exhibition Slive claimed it was previously incorrectly dated as 1635 but was actually painted 10 years earlier. The art historian Claus Grimm seemed to recognize that the drapery behind him looked similar to the iridescent dress of Hals' portrait of Aletta Hannemans, discussing these paintings after each other and placing them as painted in the same year. Possibly, as Heythuyzen was a cloth merchant, both were from workshops under his control and this portrait shows the source of his wealth as well as a romantic vision of himself as a bachelor. Because he is positioned facing left, we know that this is not a wedding pendant, as Hals always placed the woman on the right facing left. Heythuizen never married and died a bachelor.

== See also ==
- List of paintings by Frans Hals
