= Willem van Heythuysen =

Dutch cloth merchant and hofje founder

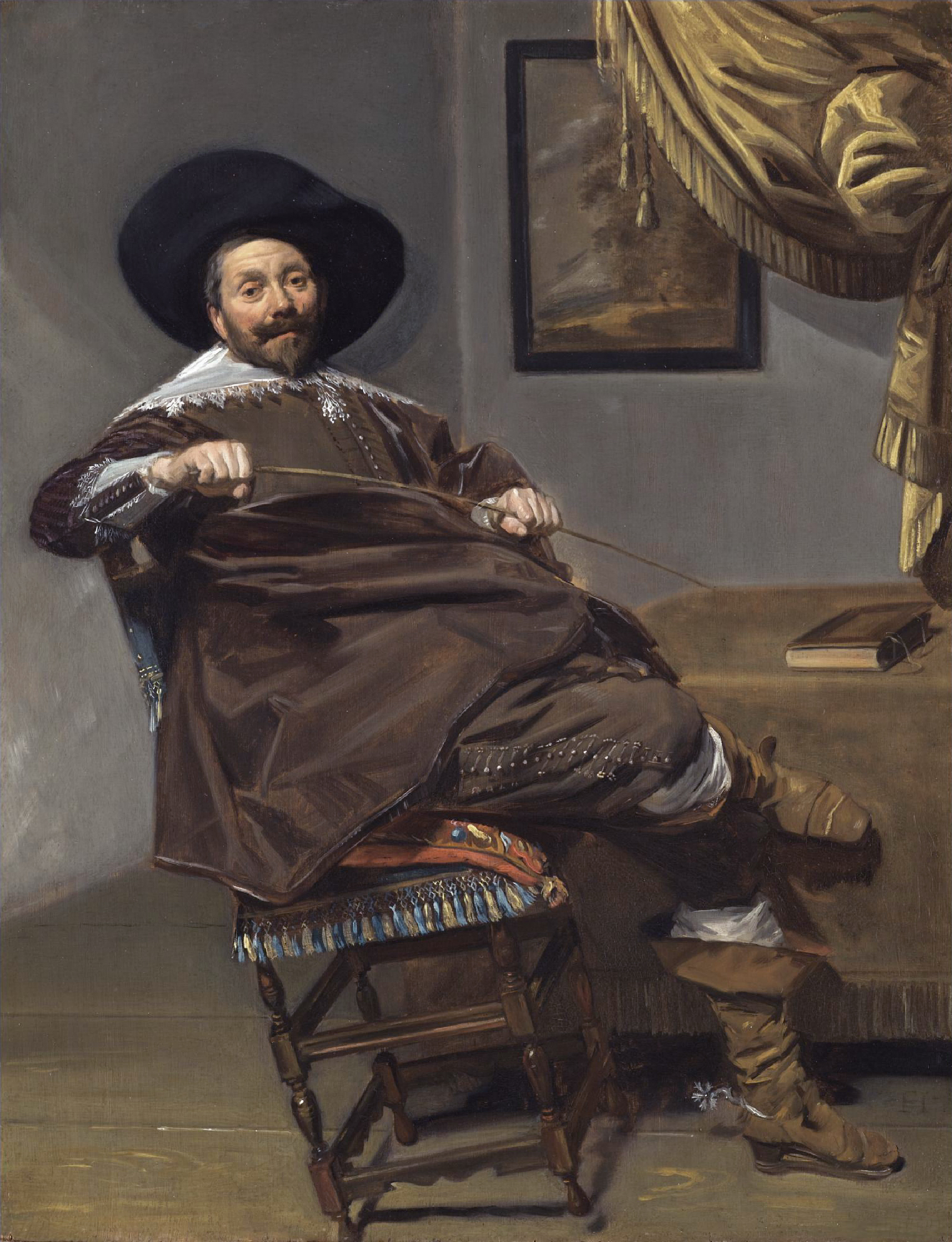
- Painting of Willem van Heythuijsen in 1634 by Frans Hals
- Born: Willem van Heythuysen ca. 1590s Weert, Netherlands
- Died: ca. 1650; Haarlem, Netherlands
- Occupation(s): merchant and hofje founder
- Relatives: Geertruyd (sister) Marten van Sittard (cousin)

Willem van Heythuysen (1590s – 1650), was a Dutch cloth merchant and hofje founder in Haarlem and Weert. He is best known today for his portraits by Frans Hals, though he is remembered locally for his Hofje van Willem Heythuijsen bordering Haarlemmerhout park, which has been in operation for centuries.

== Biography ==
He was born in Weert, but moved to Haarlem via Cologne, where he first lived with Willem van Heuvel. He became a cloth merchant and lived in a large double house on the Oude Gracht (now called Gedempte Oude Gracht) near the Verwulft. Like many other merchants of Haarlem, he owned a summer house along the Spaarne river, facing the Haarlemmerhout park. His neighbor there on the grounds of Spaar en Hout, was Zacharias Hooftman, an Amsterdam merchant who lived in the winter on the Herengracht. Van Heythuysen never married, but lived with his sister Geertruyd.

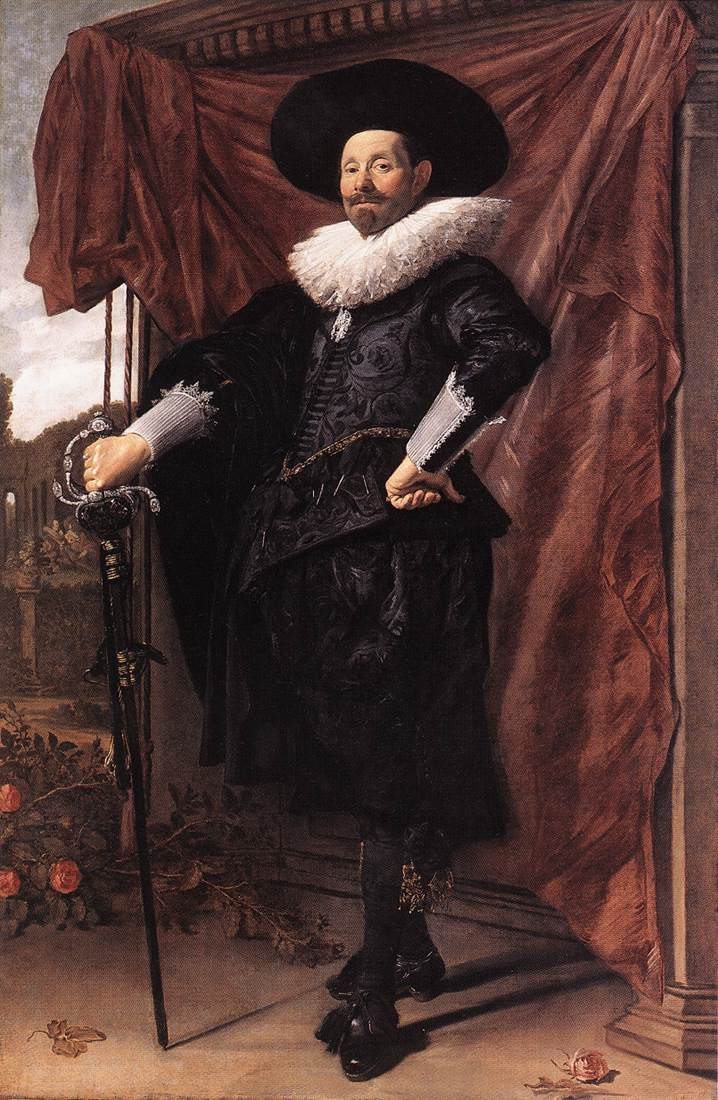
Willem van Heythuysen posing with a sword in 1625, Alte Pinakothek, Munich

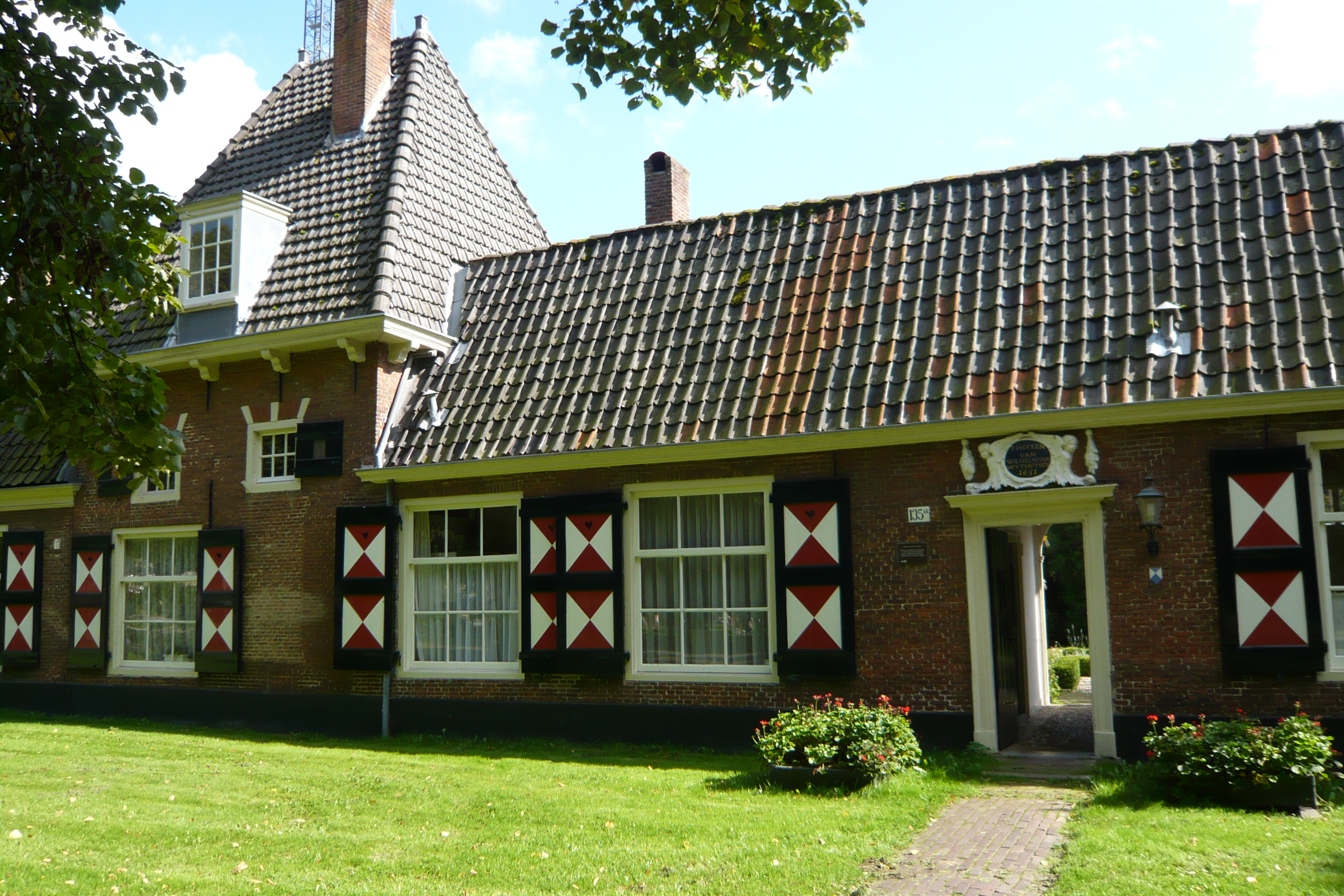
Haarlem hofje created after his death

Van Heythuysen drew up his will and testament in Haarlem with notary Willem van Trier on 13 September 1636. He named his sister Geertruyd as benefactress, but she died only a few weeks after he did in 1650. His will was then executed by his cousin Marten van Sittard and his associate Tieleman Roosterman. Most of what we know about him today comes from this document, which is also his charter for founding the hofjes named after him, namely the Hofje van Willem Heythuijsen in Haarlem, and the Hofje van Willem Heythuijsen in Weert. Though Weert is near the town of Heythuysen, Willem van Heythuysen's family had probably been living in Weert for at least a generation, because a year before he signed his will specifying hofjes to be built in Haarlem and Weert, he had already purchased a property for 925 guilders in Weert to found a poorhouse there which would give precedence to members of his family. According to his will, the hofjes were to be built and maintained after his death with funds from the proceeds of his estate. He appointed his brother Frans van Heythuysen and Tieleman Roosterman to build the hofje in Weert. Tieleman Roosterman was one of the two executors of the will, the other one was Marten van Sittard. Roosterman was also the one who built the hofje in Haarlem and he also became its first regent.

== Portraits by Frans Hals ==
Maerten van Sittard commissioned a copy of the famous Frans Hals portrait of Willem van Heythuysen leaning back in his chair, a portrait that hung in the Haarlem hofje for centuries. In August 1653 he made a payment "to Frans Hals for the portrait of Van Heythuysen, 36 Guilders". It was sold by the hofje regents in 1869 by public auction in Paris and was acquired the following year by the Royal Museums of Fine Arts of Belgium in Brussels. Long considered an original portrait painted from life, it was recently, determined that this picture was actually painted after Van Heythuysen died as a copy for the hofje by the artist himself of his earlier 1630s original. The "1630s version" first appeared at auction in 2008 and was sold for 9 million euros.

All in all, Hals painted him three times, including the copy. The other full-length portrait is the one hanging in the Liechtenstein gallery where he poses with a sword. That impressive painting may have been intended as a pendant wedding portrait. He was betrothed to Alida Roosterman (c. 1620–1647), the younger sister of Tieleman, but she died before they could be married.

== Legacy ==
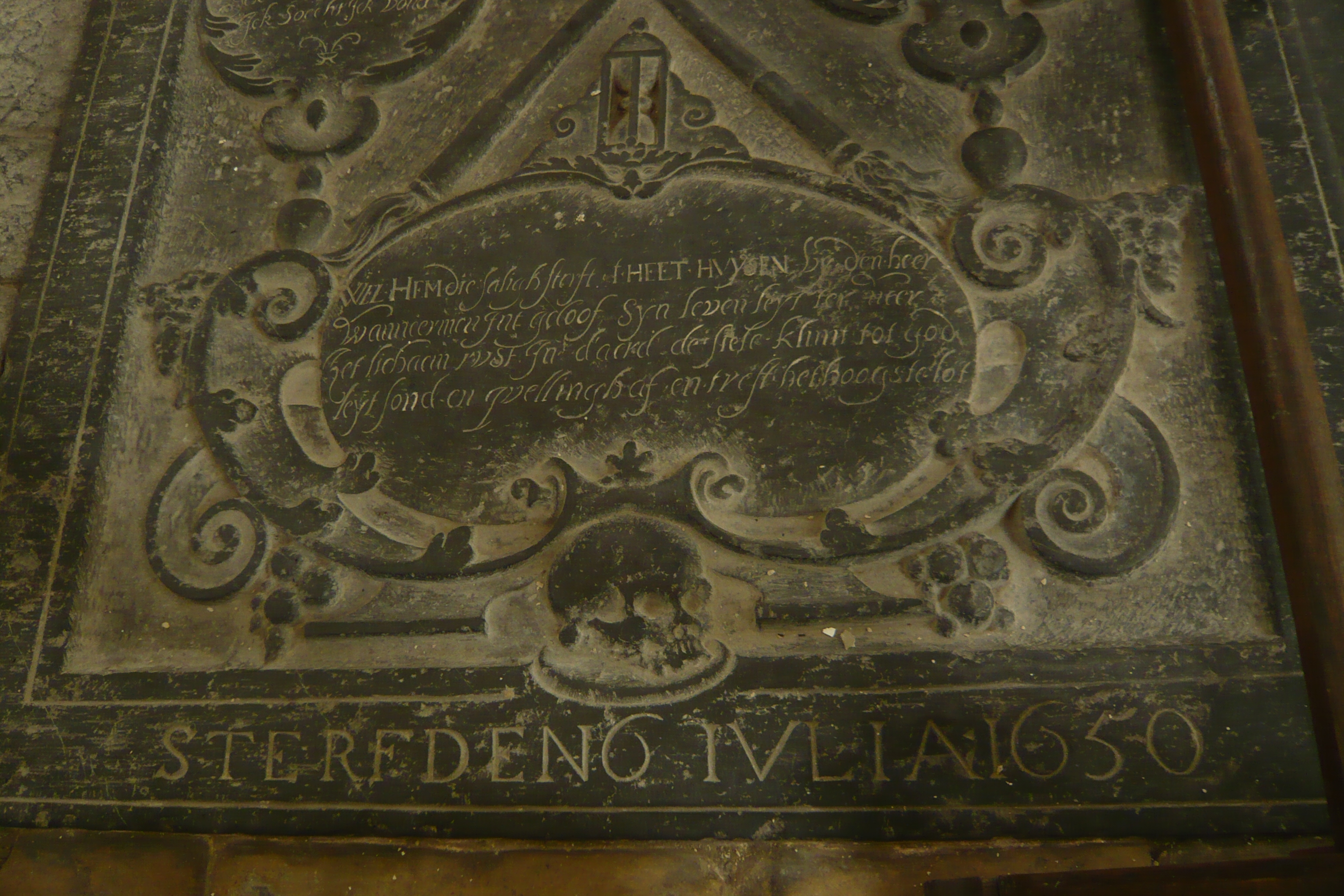
Heethuysen grave epitaph (Died July 6th, 1650) in Sint-Bavokerk.

Nothing remains today of the original homes of Willem van Heythuysen. His summer home "Middelhout" was sold to Hendrik van Vladeracken, brother-in-law to Roosterman. Hendrik's daughter Susanna became a regent of the hofje and lived to be 90. Thanks to her legacy, the hofje underwent repairs and has remained solvent up to today. A painting was made to honor her that is now in the possession of the Frans Hals Museum. Today on the location of the old Middelhout, an old age home called Spaar en Hout is located. In recent years a modern apartment complex called Middelhout has been built on a corner of the old grounds of Sparenhout.

The two hofjes both fared better than his homes. The Haarlem one still exists today, but the Weert one was deconstructed in 1876 to make way for a Catholic school. Willem van Heythuysen was buried in the St. Bavochurch in Haarlem, where his gravestone can still be seen on the south side of the choir.
