= Portrait of Catharina Brugman =

Painting by Frans Hals

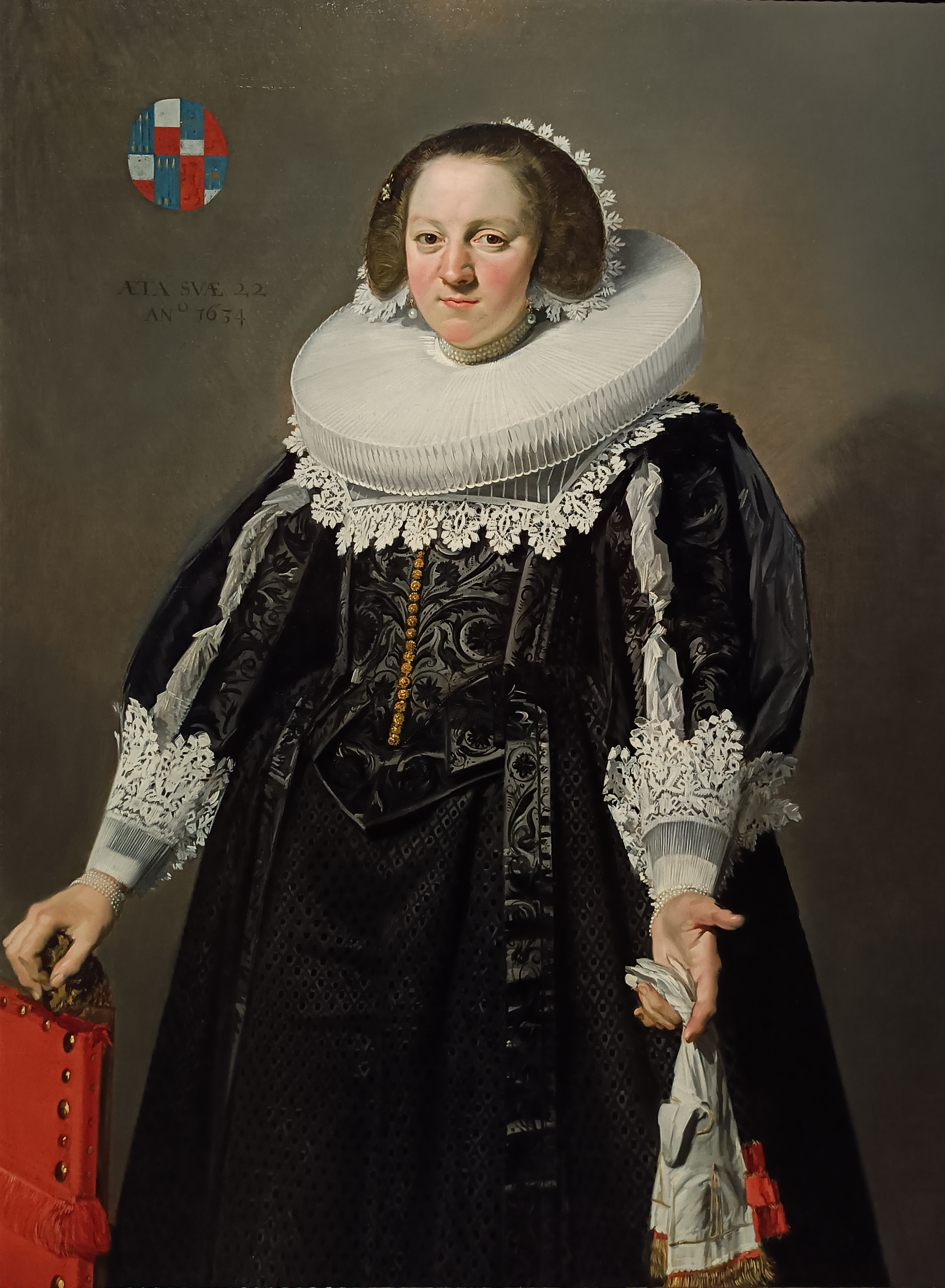
- Portrait of Catharina Brugmans, 1634, oil on canvas, 115 cm x 85 cm.
- Artist: Frans Hals
- Year: 1634
- Catalogue: Hofstede de Groot, Catalog 1910: #218
- Medium: Oil on canvas
- Dimensions: 115 cm × 85 cm (45 in × 33 in)
- Owner: Private collection

Portrait of Catharina Brugman is an oil-on-canvas painting by the Dutch Golden Age painter Frans Hals, painted in 1634 and now in a private collection. It is considered a pendant to the portrait of Catharina's husband Tieleman Roosterman.

== Life ==
Catharina Brugman was baptized in Amsterdam on 15 October 1609 as the daughter of the cloth merchant Jan Pietersz Brugman and Maria Adriaens. She was engaged to Tieleman on 27 November 1631, the same year that a property investment in the Beemster was made over from Jan's name to his widow Maria. This same property was later made over to Tieleman in 1649.

== Painting ==
The portrait was inscribed with the year 1634 and the bride's age being 22, but since she was 22 when she married in 1631 it is probably a bit earlier. Similar to Hals' other wedding portraits of standing women, she is holding the back of a chair with her right hand. Her diadem cap is edged with lace in the manner of Hals' portrait of Sara Wolphaerts van Diemen. Her dress is the height of fashion and shows a moment when flat collars and wide millstone collars were worn together. She is holding a wedding glove that presumably matches the one in her husband's portrait. Her portrait was documented by Hofstede de Groot in 1910, who wrote:

218. CATHARINA BRUGMAN, wife of Tileman Roosterman. B. 59; M. 66. Three-quarter-length. She stands, turning slightly to the left, and looks at the spectator. Her right hand rests on the back of a chair; her left hand holds her gloves. She wears a lace-trimmed cap, a rich dress with a lace collar as well as a ruff and fine lace ruffles. At the top to the left is her coat-of-arms. Inscribed below the coat-of-arms, "AETA SVAE 22 (and under this) ANo 1634"; canvas, 46 inches by 34 inches. Exhibited by the Amsterdam dealers F. Muller, 1907, No. 13. In the collection of Count Andre Mniszech, Paris. In the possession of the Paris dealer F. Kleinberger.

Hofstede de Groot did not identify it as a pendant of Tieleman's portrait, but he wrote very little about it: "354. Portrait of a Man. See B. 126; M. 131. He wears a velvet coat with a white collar and wristbands. He holds his hat in one hand, and his gloves in the other. Inscribed, "aetat 36, 1634"; canvas, 46 inches by 33 1/2 inches. Sale. F. J. Gsell, Vienna, March 14, 1872, No. 40."

In 1974 Seymour Slive listed these as pendants.

The painting was exhibited publicly for the first time since the 1930s at the Frans Hals exhibition at the National Gallery, London in 2023-24 alongside its pendant.

== Wedding Pendant ==
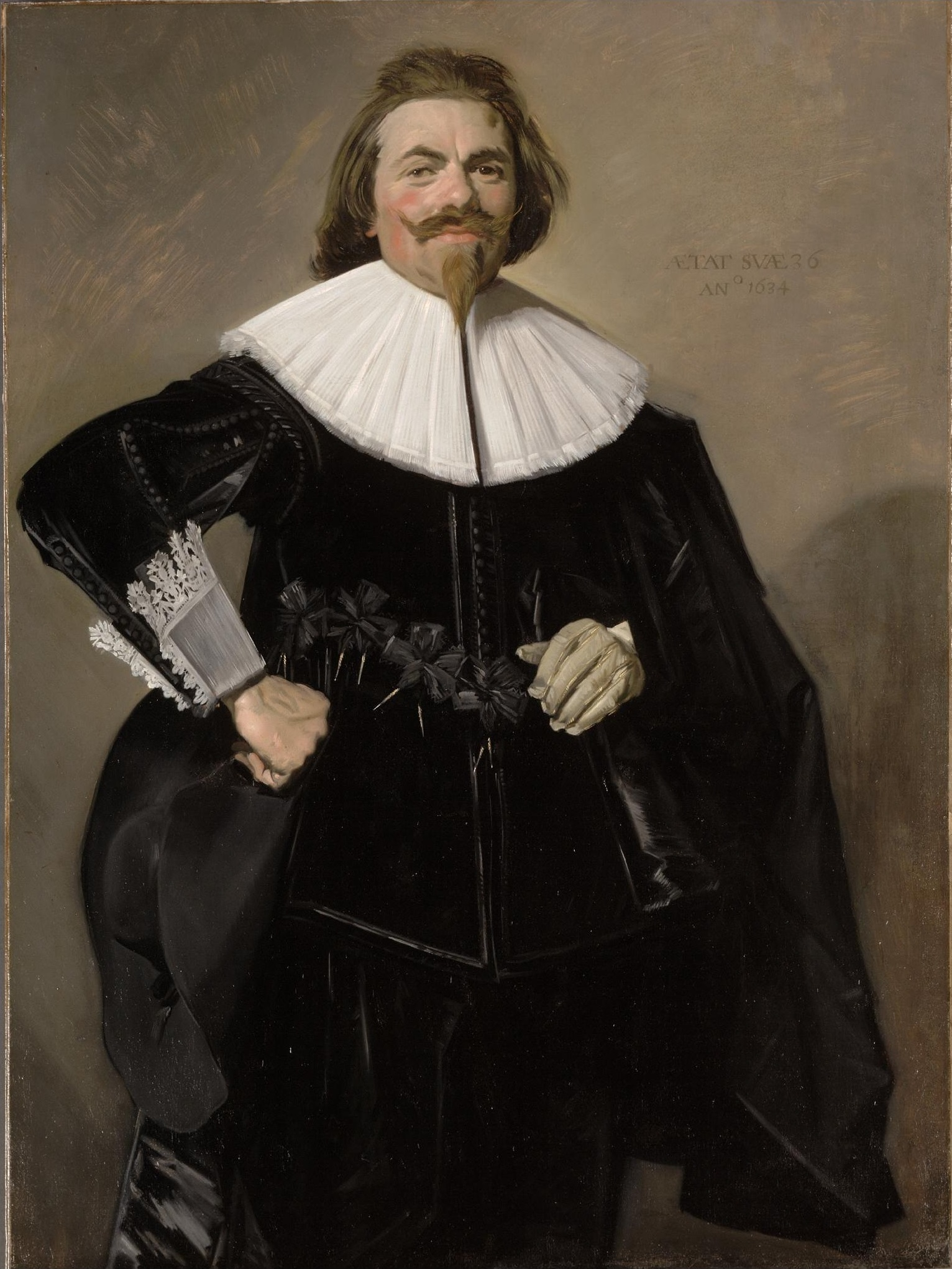

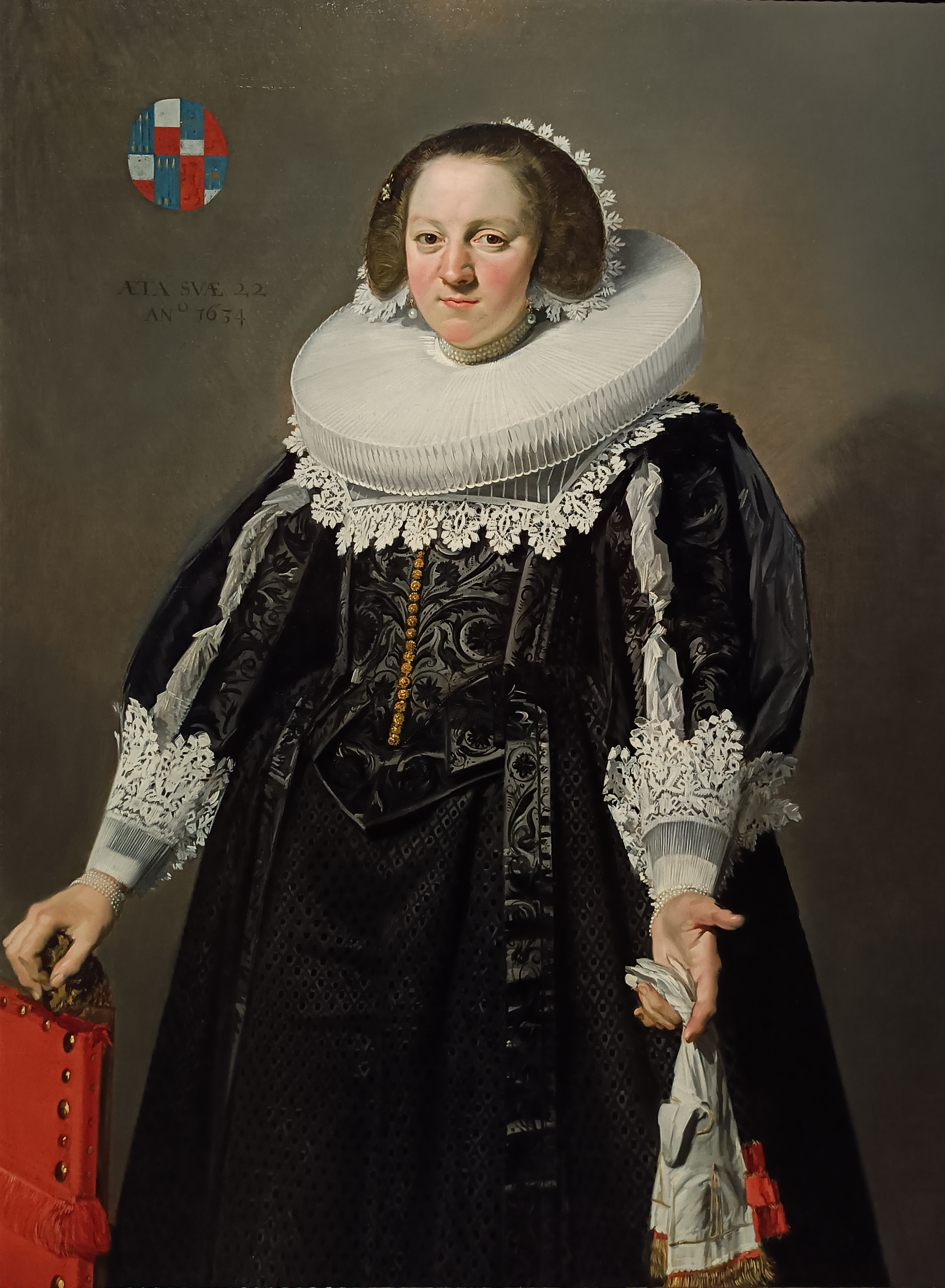

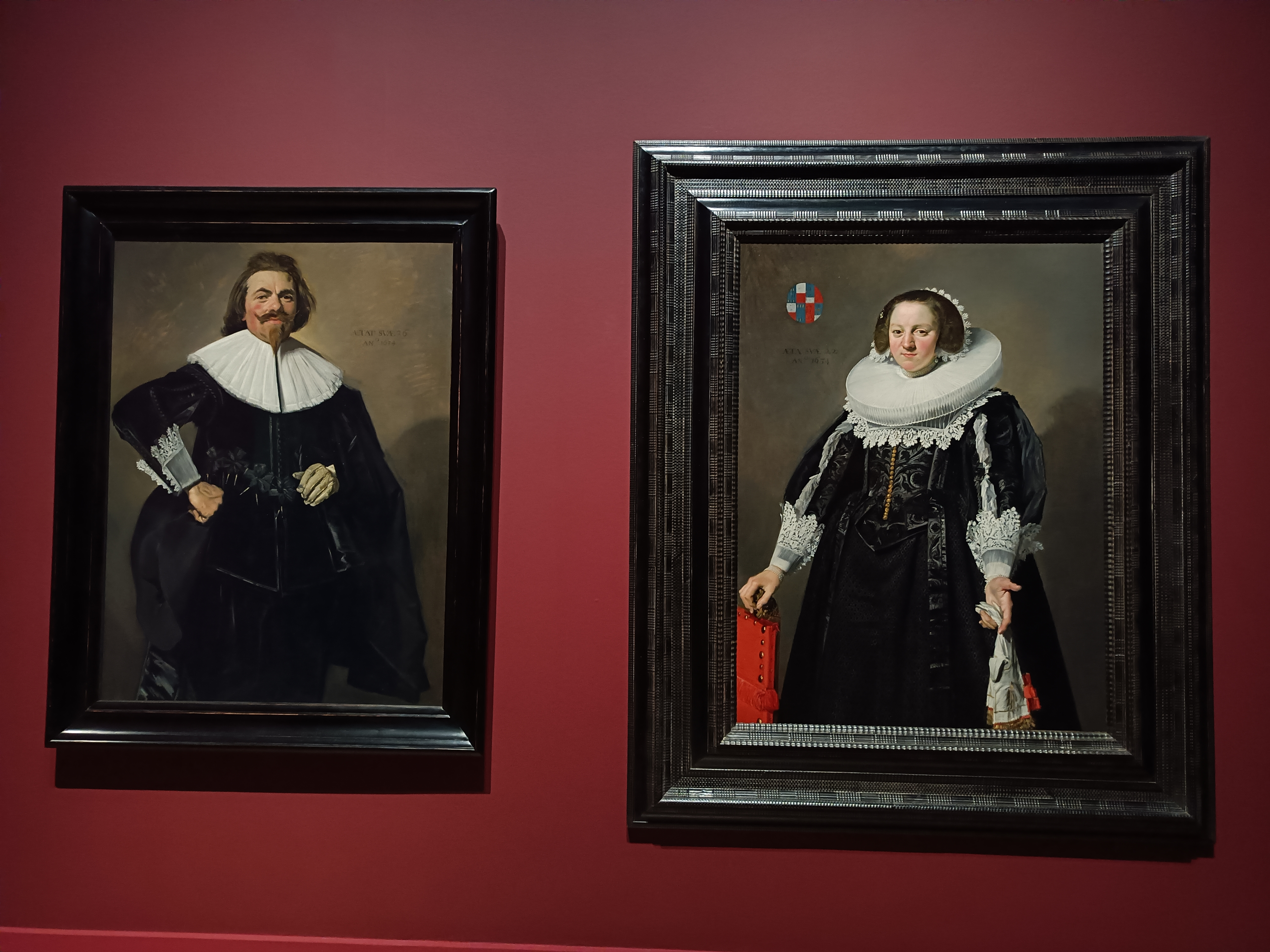
The two paintings hanging together at the Frans Hals exhibition at the National Gallery, London (2023-24)

== See also ==
- List of paintings by Frans Hals
