= Standing Cavalier =

1630 painting by Judith Leyster

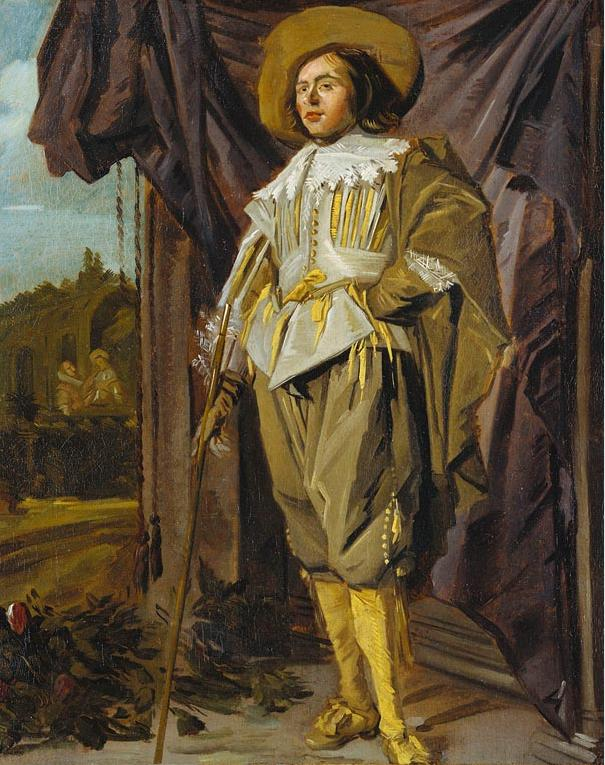
- Artist: Judith Leyster
- Year: 1630
- Medium: Oil on canvas
- Dimensions: 62.5 cm × 42 cm (24.6 in × 17 in)
- Location: Royal Collection; London

Standing Cavalier is a painting by Judith Leyster in the Royal Collection. It is the only painting by Leyster with a provenance that dates back to the 18th-century.

== Provenance ==
The painting was acquired by George III for his collection as a work by Jacob Jordaens in 1762 from Consul Smith. It was first attributed to Frans Hals by Wilhelm von Bode in 1883 and was listed in Hals catalogs until W.R. Valentiner and Numa S. Trivas rejected the Hals attribution, calling it "a study". It was overlooked by Harms in 1927, but Seymour Slive identified it as a work by Leyster, listing it alongside a California copy and an Amsterdam drawing as studies for the Hals portrait Willem van Heythuysen posing with a sword. The painting is unsigned but is dated five years after the Hals portrait, based on the biographical details of Leyster and the visual evidence that the two paintings are clearly related.

According to Hofrichter, the drapery is echoed in Leyster's Carousing Couple.

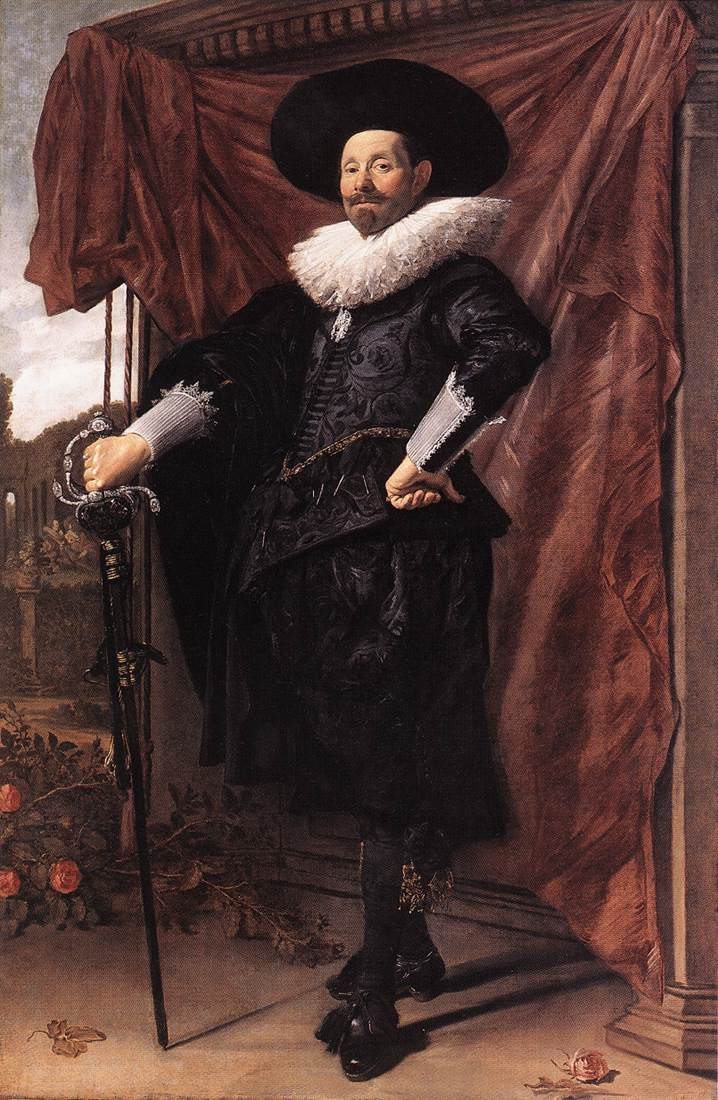

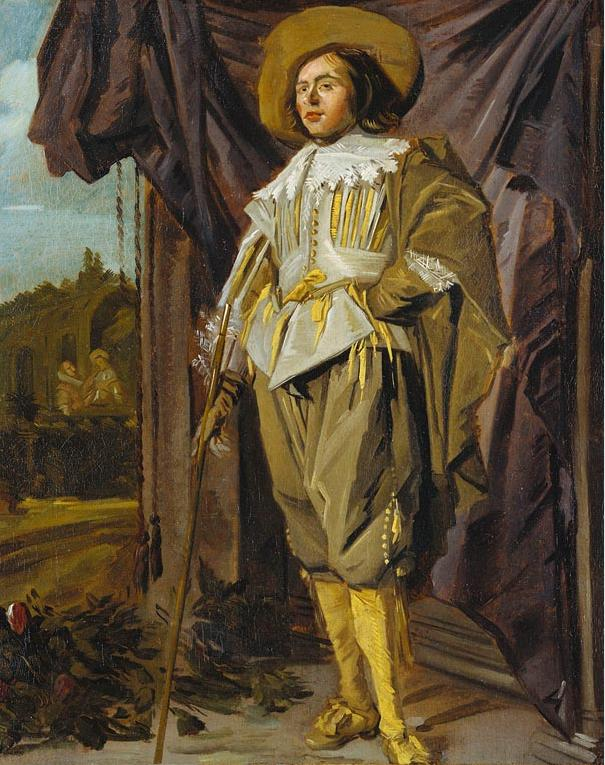

== See also ==
- List of paintings by Judith Leyster
- List of paintings by Frans Hals
