= Tieleman Roosterman =

Dutch cloth merchant

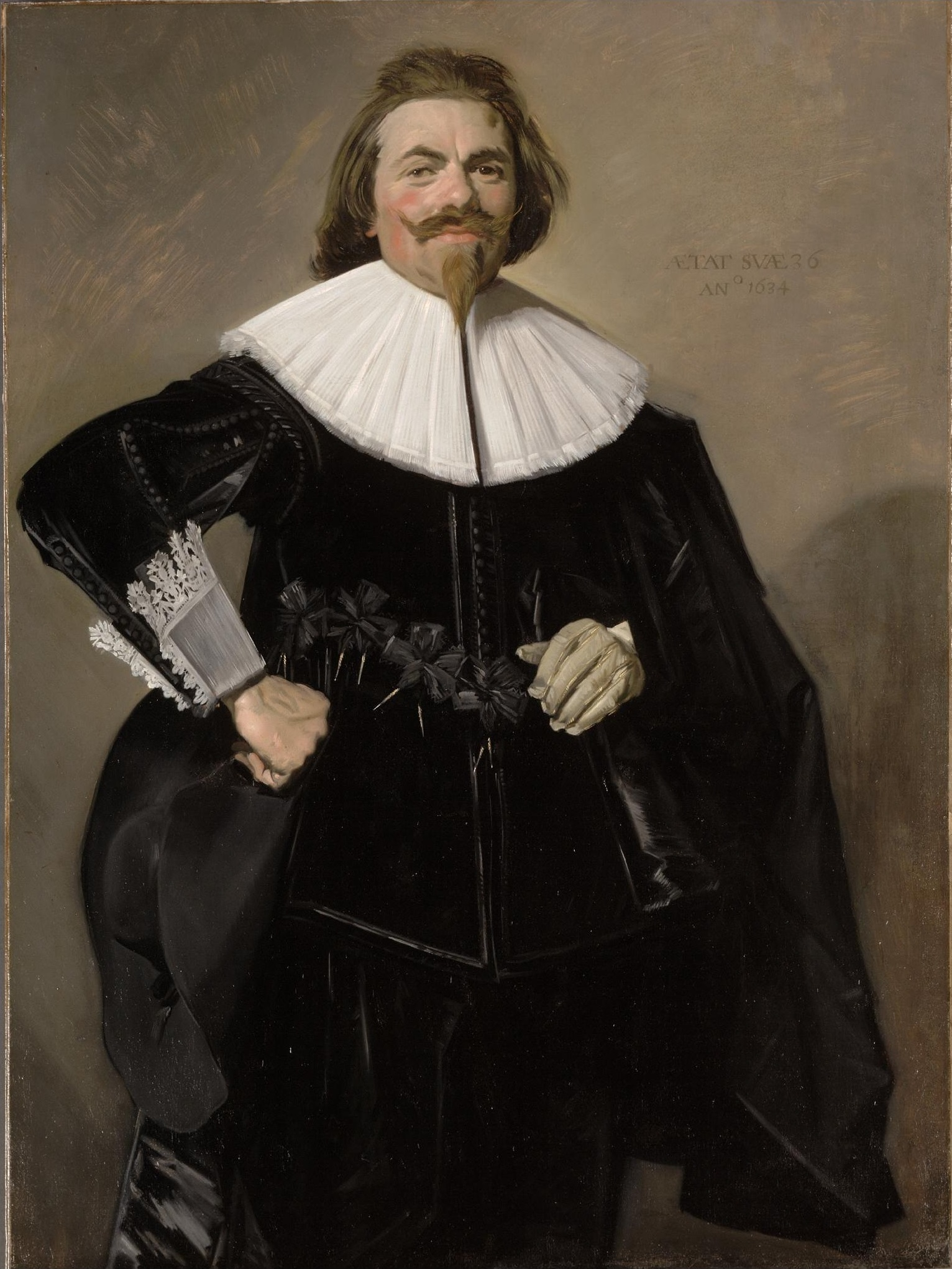
Portrait of Tieleman Roosterman by Frans Hals, The Cleveland Museum of Art

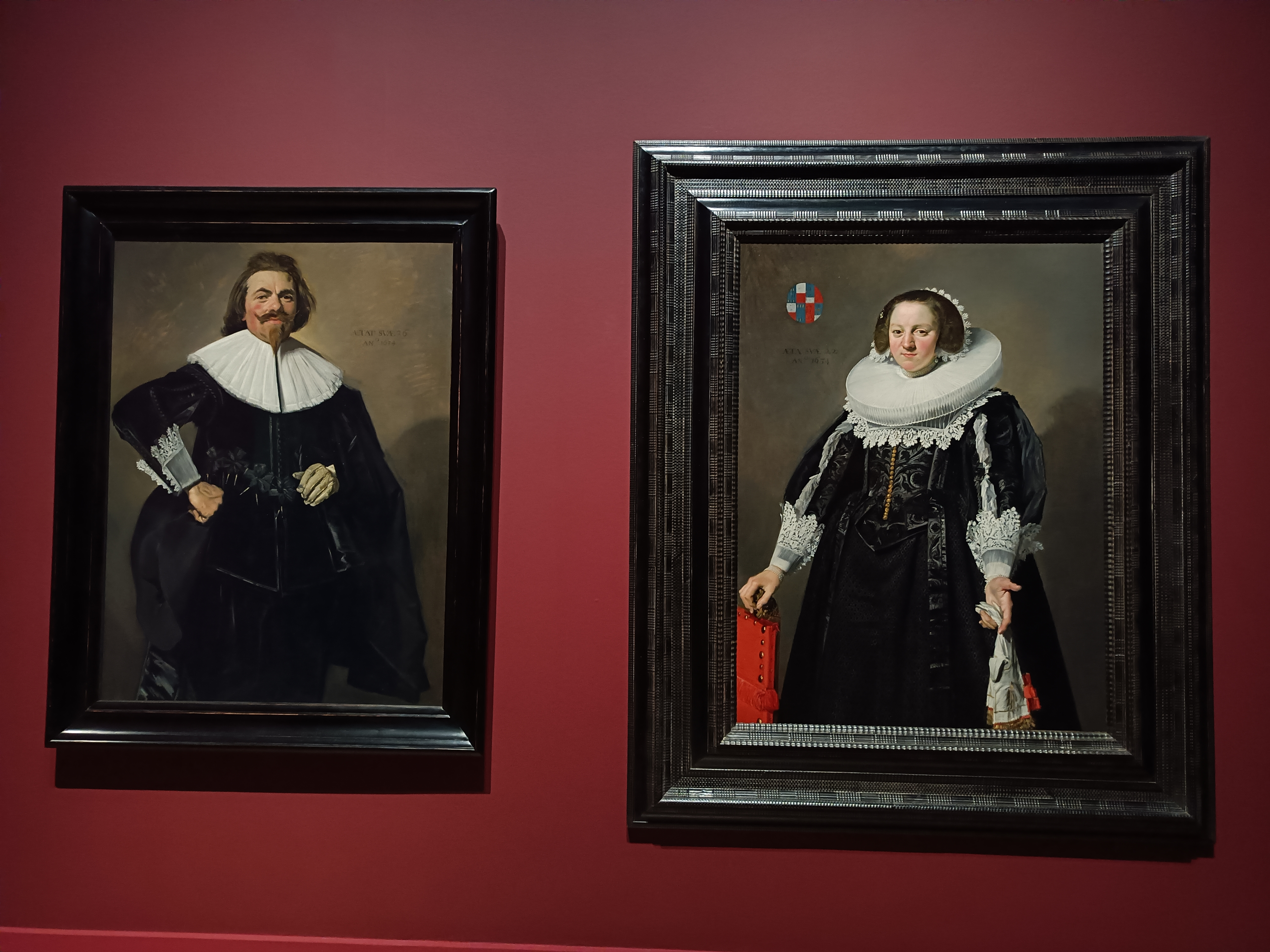
The paintings of Roosterman and Brugmans hanging together at the Frans Hals exhibition in the National Gallery, London (2023-24)

Tieleman Roosterman (1598 – 1673), was a Dutch cloth merchant and friend of Willem van Heythuysen. Roosterman is best remembered today for his portrait painted by Frans Hals.

== Biography ==
According to Pieter Biesboer he is possibly also the subject of the painting known as The Laughing Cavalier. The portrait he is most known for was dated in 1634, and probably commissioned on the occasion of his wedding to Catharina Brugmans in 1631. The Roostermans were rich textile merchants who lived in a large house on the Smedestraat and who associated with wealthy cloth merchants of Haarlem and Amsterdam. They baptised 10 children between 1633 and 1652. The former occupants of their house was the family of Joseph Coymans, and like Coymans before them, they made use of the services of their neighbor, the notary Henrick van Gellinckhuysen. Tieleman Roosterman was a good friend of Willem van Heythuysen and he was executor of his will and the first regent of the Hofje van Willem Heythuijsen. He had the hofje built from the proceeds of Van Heythuysen's estate. He sold his property Middelhout to Hendrick van Vladeracken, another wealthy Haarlem cloth merchant.

Hendrick was the father of Geldolph and Susanna van Vladeracken. Susanna succeeded Tieleman Roosterman as regent of the Hofje van Heythuysen, and Geldolph married the Roostermans' daughter Maria on 18 November 1674. The wedding papers of Geldolph were signed by his sister and Dorothea Berck, the widow of Joseph Coymans, who was signing as the grandmother of Geldoph's first wife Anna Druyvesteyn, who had died young in 1672.

He was buried in the Church of St Bavo near his friend Willem van Heythuysen and his wife followed him in 1677. Their house in the Smedestraat continued to be occupied by their son Hendrick until his death.
