= Hofje van Willem Heythuijsen =

Hofje in Haarlem, Netherlands

Coordinates: 52°22′11″N 4°37′57″E

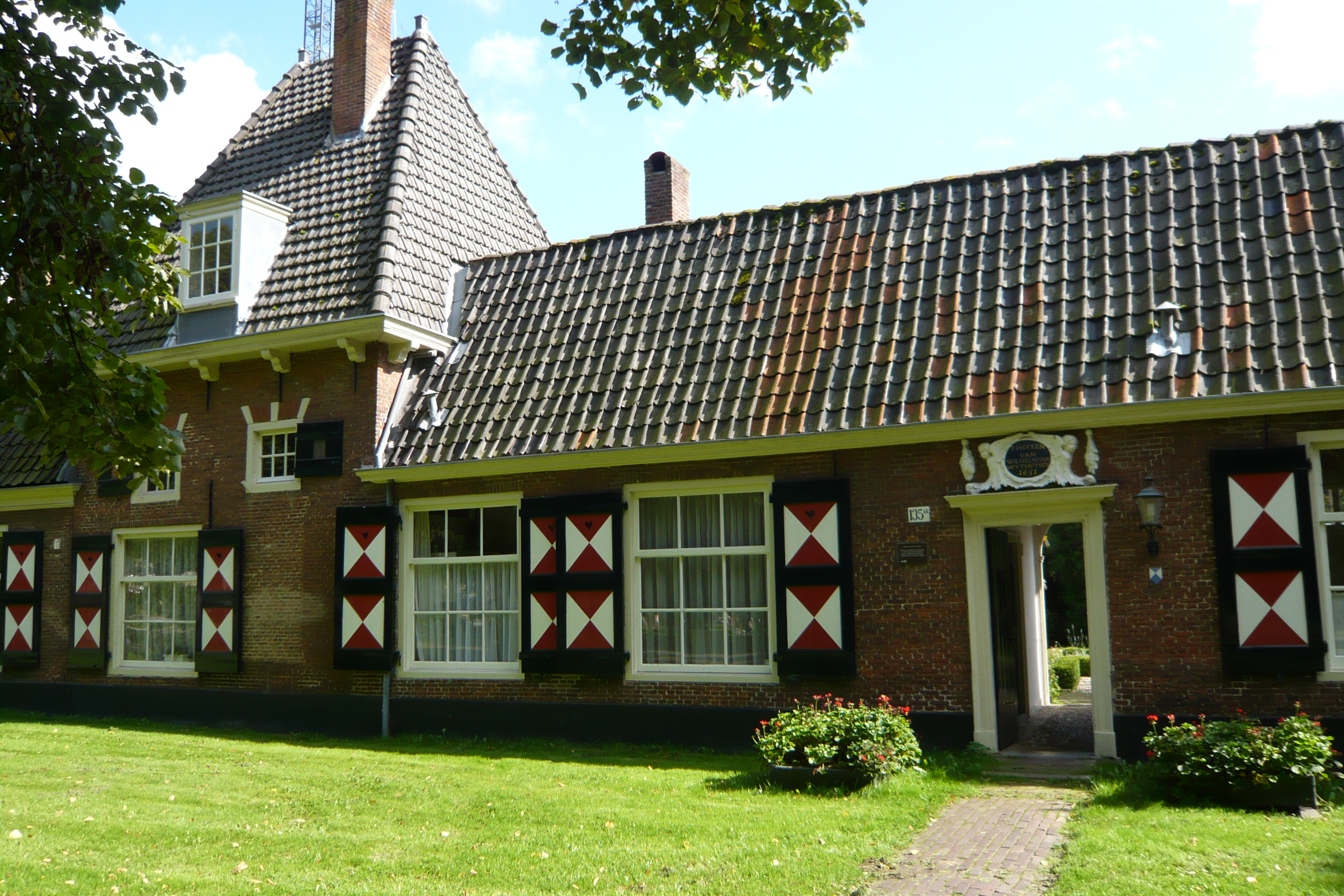
Hofje front door on the East side of the Haarlemmerhout park, showing the narrow passage to the garden on the South side of the T-shaped complex. Above the door, the plaque reads; "'t Hofken van Wilhelm van Heythuysen, 1651". On the left, the taller tower-like building is the oldest structure standing.

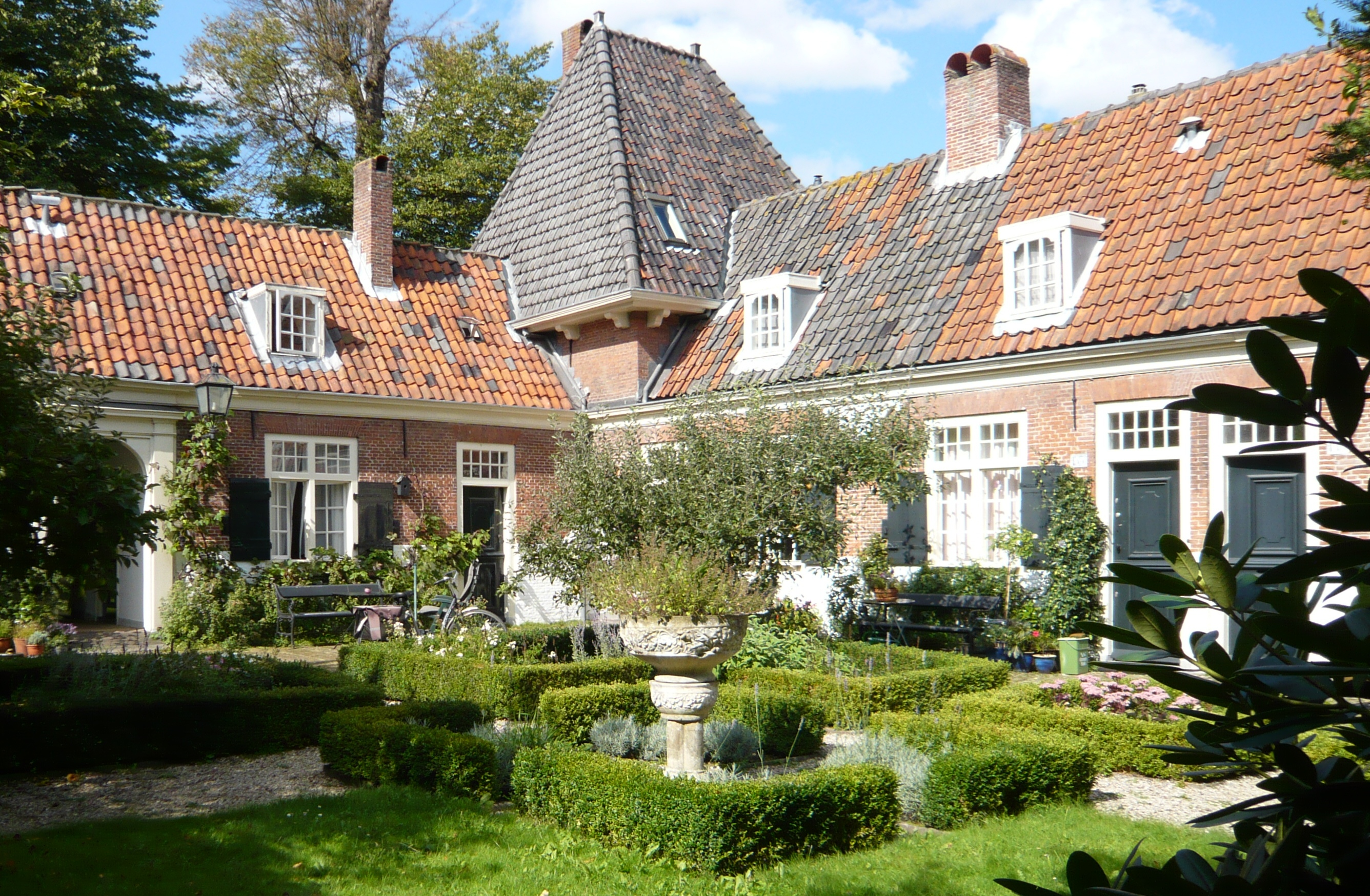
Hofje garden on the South side of the T-shaped complex. In the back, the taller tower-like building can be seen.

The Hofje van Willem Heythuijsen is a hofje in Haarlem, Netherlands. It was founded in 1650 by the testament of Willem van Heythuysen (sometimes spelled Heijthuijsen) on the site of his summer residence outside the city walls of Haarlem on land that was considered Heemstede property until it was annexed in 1927. It is one of the few hofjes of Haarlem to be built outside the city walls. It has a 'T' shape and has a small open courtyard and a garden still intact.

== Biography ==
Willem Heythuijsen was a cloth merchant born in Weert, a small city in Dutch Limburg. Frans Hals painted him several times, and one of these portraits hung in this hofje for centuries. In 1636 Willem van Heythuijsen had his will and testament drawn up with the plans for this hofje in the event that he and his sister would die without issue. All of the information we have today about Willem van Heythuijsen is from this will and the acts drawn up by his executors Tieleman Roosterman and Marten van Sittart. Roosterman was the first regent of the hofje and also had his portrait painted by Frans Hals.

After his sister Geertruyd van Heyhuysen died, his double house on the Oude gracht were sold, as was his summer home on the Spaarne. The summer home "Middelhout" was sold to Hendrik van Vladeracken, brother-in-law to Rosterman. Their daughter Susanna became a regent of the hofje and lived to be 90. Thanks to her legacy, the hofje underwent repairs and a painting was made to honor her that is now in the possession of the Frans Hals Museum. Today Middelhout is called Spaar en Hout and is an old age home.

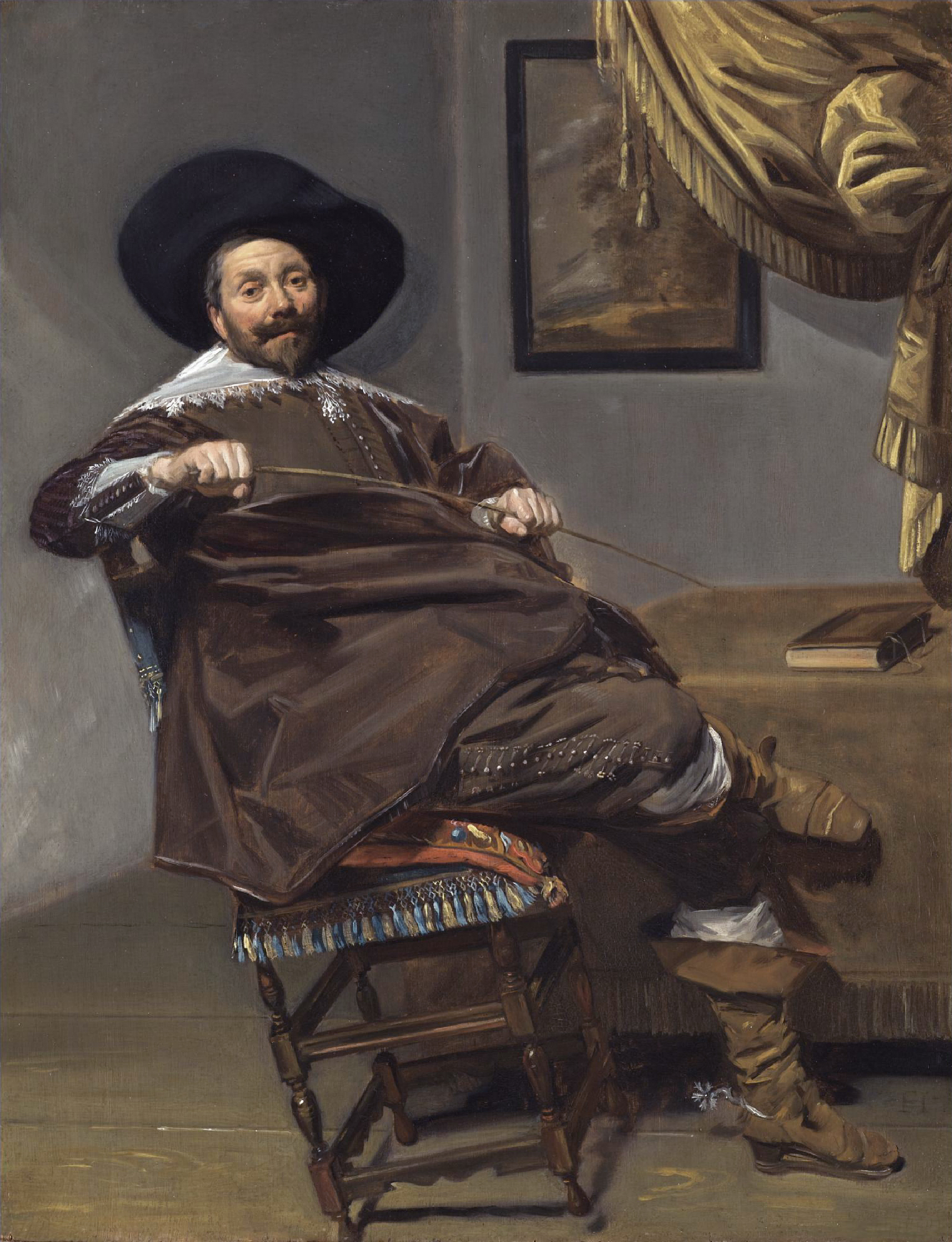
Painting of Willem van Heythuijsen by Frans Hals, a copy of which hung in the hofje

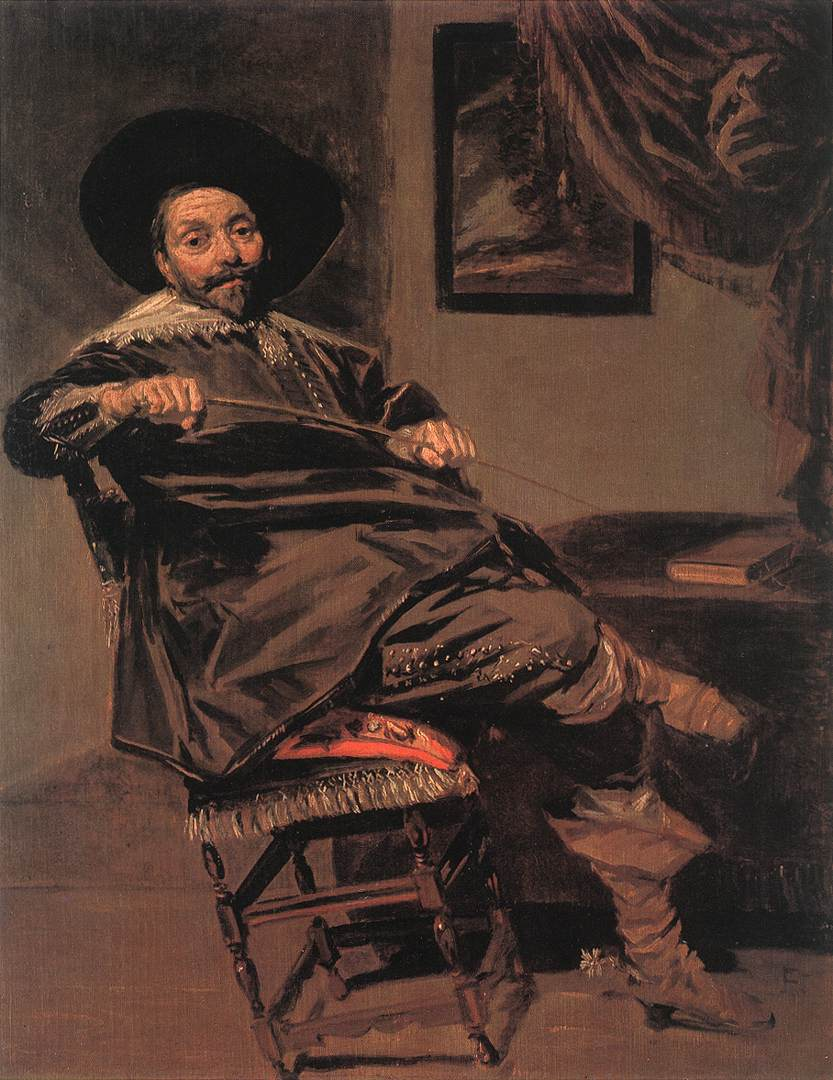
The later copy which once hung in the regents room in Haarlem

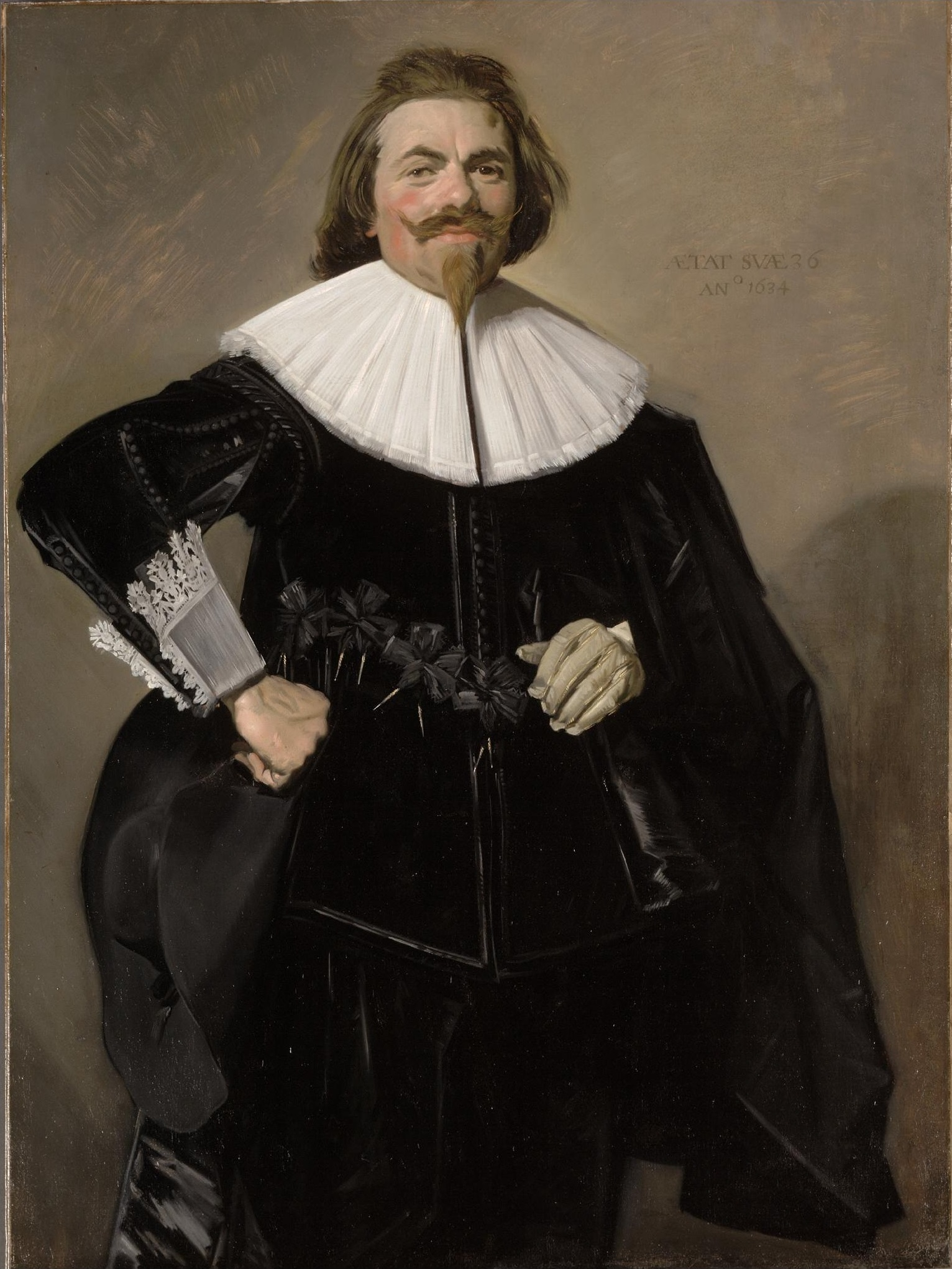
Painting of Tieleman Rosterman by Frans Hals, the first regent of the hofje

The proceeds of the van Heythuijsen estate were used to convert the orchard and the gardener's houses of Middelhout into a hofje with room for twelve pensioners, and enough money was left over to make donations to the Oudemannenhuis (currently the location of the Frans Hals Museum), the Diaconie (currently the location of the Police station), and to the city of Weert for founding a hofje there as well. To provide income for the hofje, more land was purchased just north of this hofje outside the city walls in an area called Rozenprieel, which generated income from rents.

Unlike many other hofjes, this hofje accommodated both male and female inhabitants, until it switched to only female inhabitants in the 18th century. The hofje was built on the border with Heemstede, and the regent's room was south of the rest of the complex on Heemstede land. For centuries a stone border marker was situated in front of the entrance. In 1927 Haarlem annexed a large portion of Heemstede and the marker was removed. It is now in the garden of the Frans Hals Museum.

Address: Kleine Houtweg 135
